= List of Eurovision Song Contest winners =

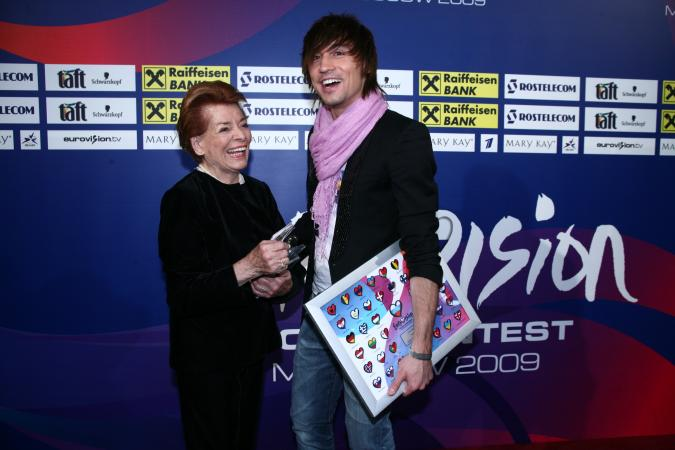
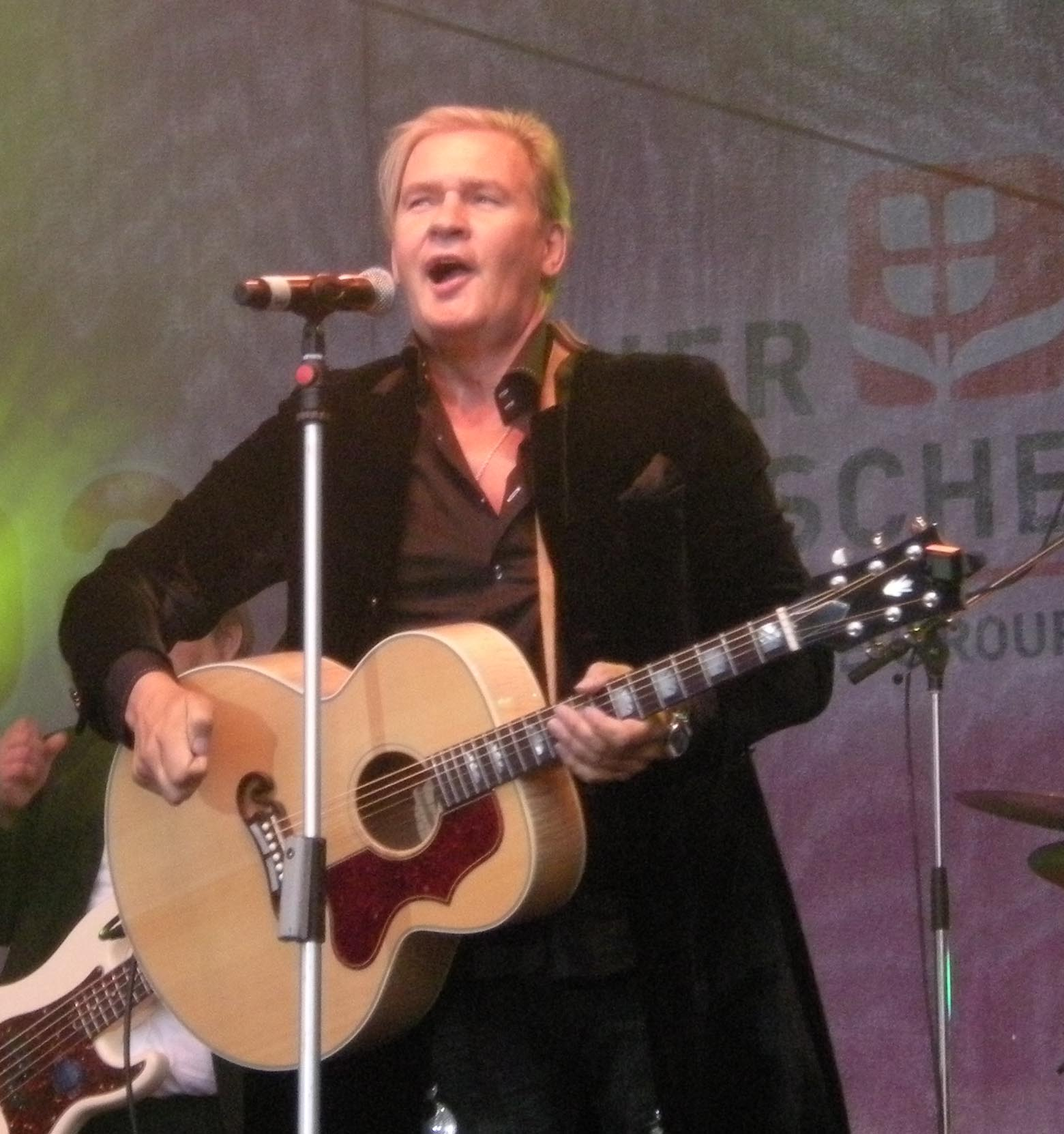
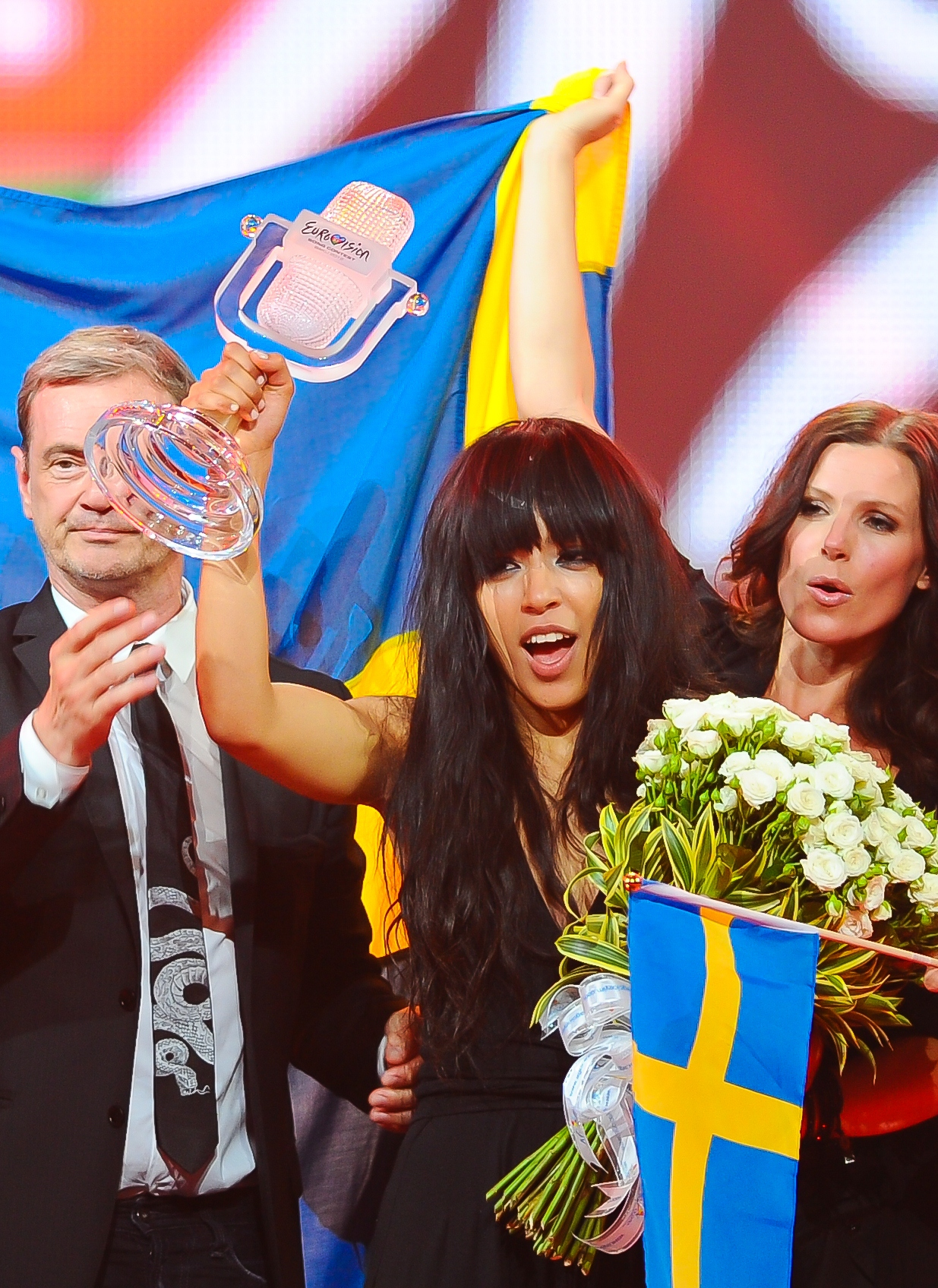
Left: Lys Assia, the first Eurovision winner (1956), and Dima Bilan, winner in 2008. Centre: Johnny Logan, the winning artist in 1980, winning artist and composer in 1987 and the winning composer in 1992. Right: Loreen, winner of the 2012 and 2023 editions, celebrating her first victory in Baku.
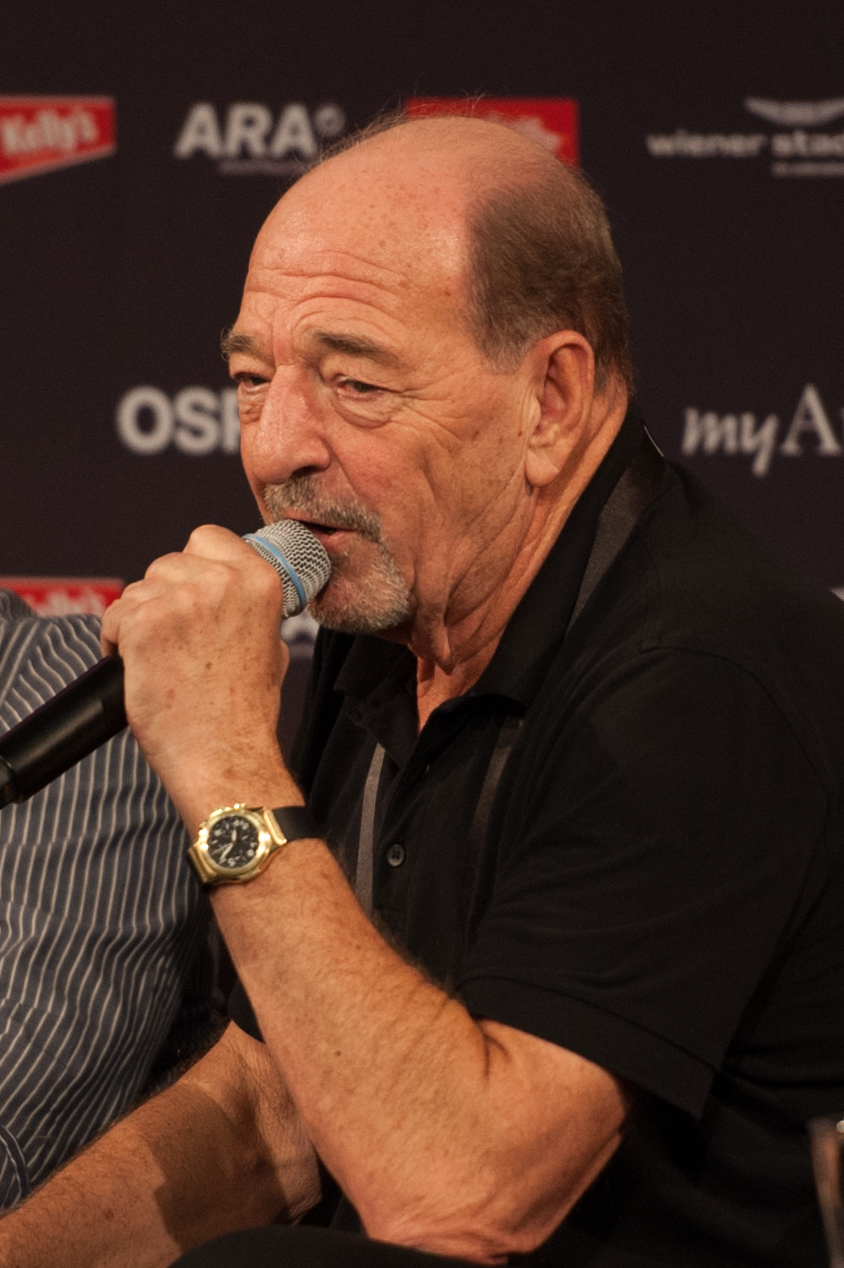
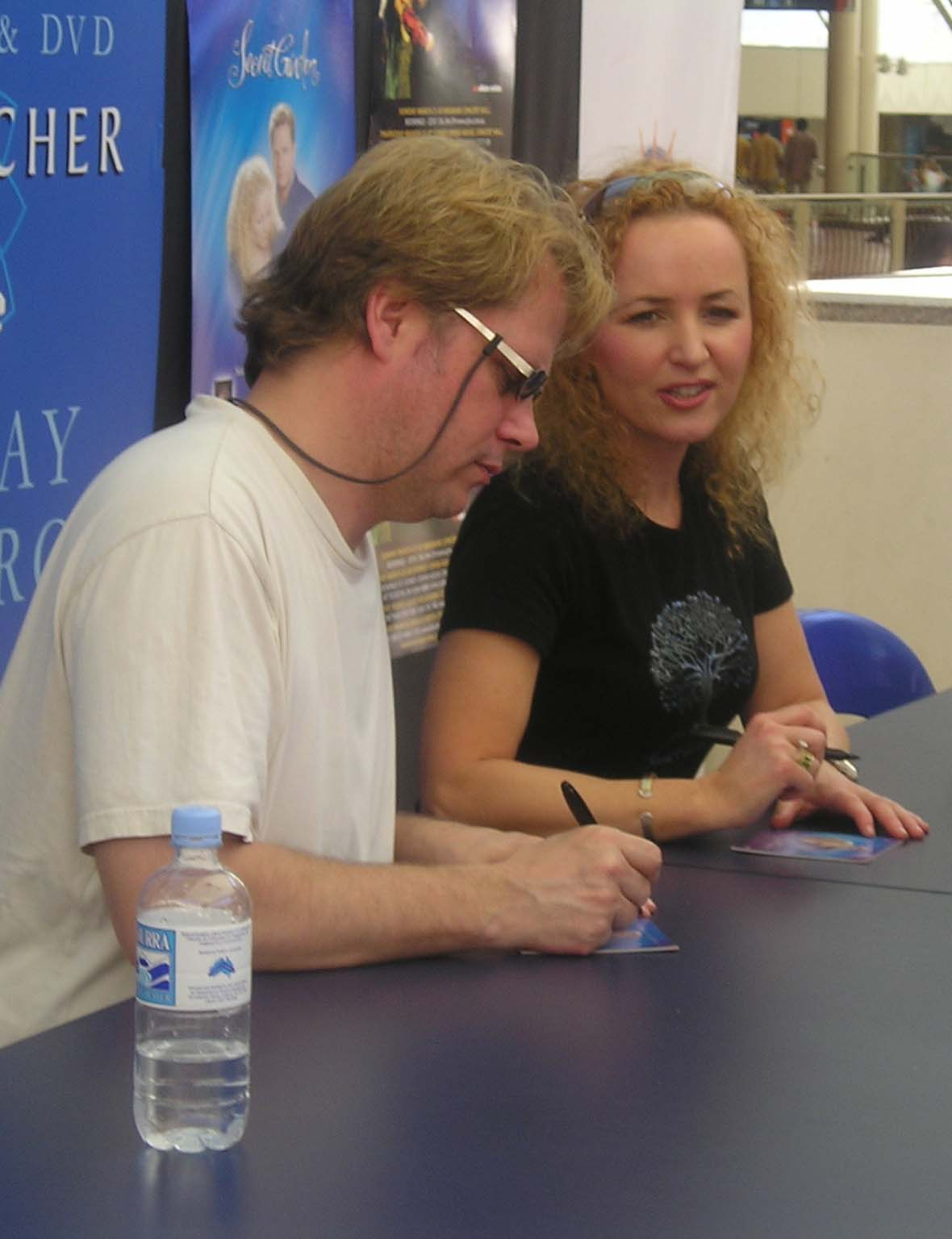
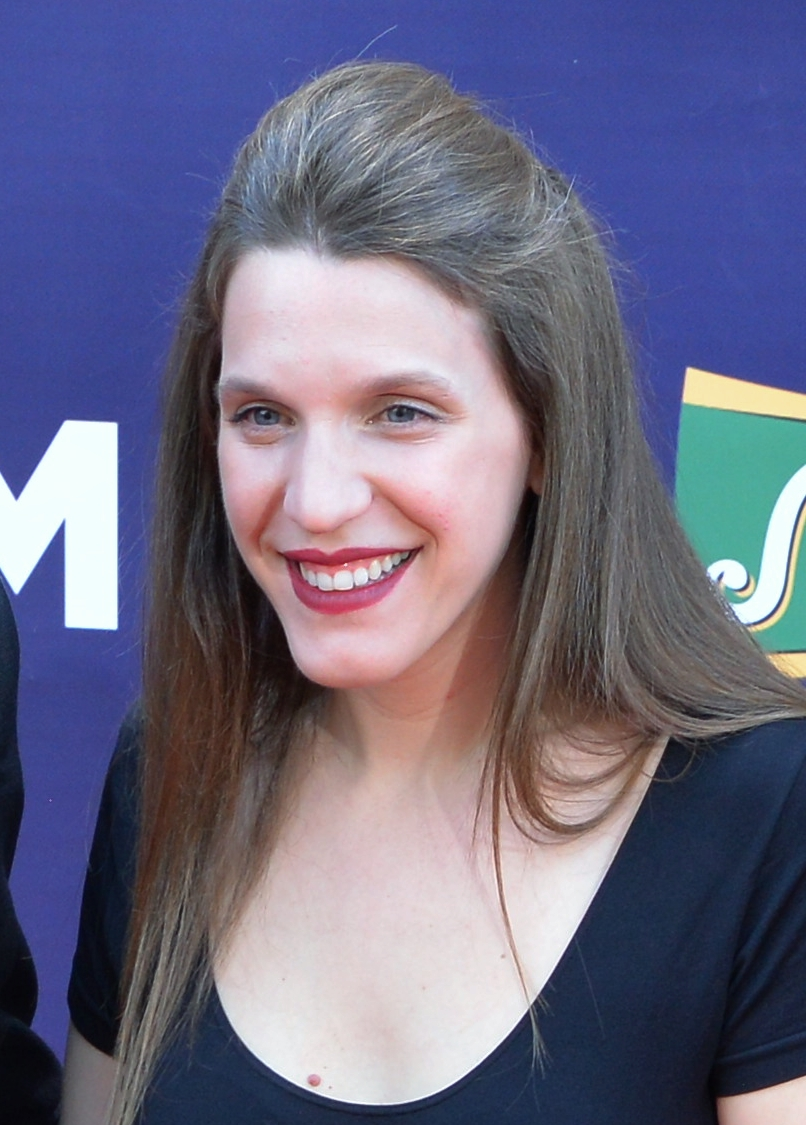
Left: Ralph Siegel, the winning songwriter in 1982 for Germany and composer of twenty-three other entries between 1974 and 2017. Centre: Rolf Løvland, the winning songwriter in 1985 and 1995 for Norway, with Fionnuala Sherry, winning performer in 1995. Right: Luísa Sobral, winning songwriter in 2017 for Portugal.

73 songs written by 154 songwriters have won the Eurovision Song Contest, an international song competition organised annually by the European Broadcasting Union (EBU). The contest, which has been broadcast every year since its debut in 1956, (Note: With the exception of 2020, when the contest was cancelled due to the COVID-19 pandemic.) is one of the longest-running television programmes in the world. The contest's winner has been determined using numerous voting techniques throughout its history; centre to these have been the awarding of points by juries or televoters. The entry awarded the most points is declared the winner. The first contest was not won on points, but by votes (two per country), and only the winner was announced.

There have been 70 contests, with one winner each year except for the tied 1969 contest, which had four. Songs representing 28 countries have won the contest, with Switzerland winning the first contest in 1956. The countries with the highest number of wins are Ireland and Sweden with seven wins each. Two people have won more than once as a performer: Ireland's Johnny Logan, who performed "What's Another Year" in 1980 and "Hold Me Now" in 1987, and Sweden's Loreen, who performed "Euphoria" in 2012 and "Tattoo" in 2023. Logan is also one of seven songwriters to have written more than one winning entry ("Hold Me Now" and "Why Me?" performed by Linda Martin in 1992), and is the only person to have three Eurovision victories to their credit, as either singer, songwriter or both. The other six songwriters with more than one winning entry to their credit are Willy van Hemert (Netherlands 1957 and 1959), Yves Dessca (Monaco 1971 and Luxembourg 1972), Rolf Løvland (Norway 1985 and 1995), Brendan Graham (Ireland 1994 and 1996), and Thomas G:son and Peter Boström (both for Sweden 2012 and 2023).

Relatively few winners of the Eurovision Song Contest have gone on to achieve major success in the music industry. The most notable winners who have gone on to become international stars are ABBA, who won for Sweden in 1974 with their song "Waterloo", and Céline Dion, who won for Switzerland in 1988 with the song "Ne partez pas sans moi". More recently, Duncan Laurence, who won for the Netherlands in 2019 with "Arcade", experienced worldwide streaming success with the song as a sleeper hit throughout 2020 and 2021, with it becoming the most streamed Eurovision entry on Spotify. Måneskin, winners for Italy in 2021 with "Zitti e buoni", subsequently achieved worldwide popularity in the months following their victory.

The performer and the songwriter(s) of the winning song only receive a medal or a trophy, while its participating broadcaster is invited to host the following year's contest. Since 2008, the performer has been awarded a handmade trophy of sandblasted glass in the shape of a 1950s microphone, while the songwriter(s) and the broadcaster receive smaller versions of the trophy. Its original design was created by Kjell Engman of Kosta Boda, who specialises in glass art. This trophy is notoriously fragile, and the support infamously broke on stage right after being received by Alexander Rybak, who won for Norway in 2009, and by Nemo, who won for Switzerland in 2024. The trophies given to Emmelie de Forest, who won for Denmark in 2013, to Netta, who won for Israel in 2018, and to JJ, who won for Austria in 2025, also broke in the exact same spot after the event. Despite this, no redesigns have been made since.

== Winners by year ==
Winners of the Eurovision Song Contest
Year	Country	Song	Artist	Songwriter(s)	Ref.
1956	Switzerland	"Refrain"	Lys Assia	Géo Voumard; Émile Gardaz	
1957	Netherlands	"Net als toen"	Corry Brokken	Guus Jansen; Willy van Hemert	
1958	France	"Dors, mon amour"	André Claveau	Hubert Giraud; Pierre Delanoë	
1959	Netherlands	"Een beetje"	Teddy Scholten	Dick Schallies; Willy van Hemert	
1960	France	"Tom Pillibi"	Jacqueline Boyer	André Popp; Pierre Cour	
1961	Luxembourg	"Nous les amoureux"	Jean-Claude Pascal	Jacques Datin; Maurice Vidalin	
1962	France	"Un premier amour"	Isabelle Aubret	Claude-Henri Vic; Roland Valade	
1963	Denmark	"Dansevise"	Grethe and Jørgen Ingmann	Otto Francker; Sejr Volmer-Sørensen	
1964	Italy	"Non ho l'età"	Gigliola Cinquetti	Nicola Salerno; Mario Panzeri	
1965	Luxembourg	"Poupée de cire, poupée de son"	France Gall	Serge Gainsbourg	
1966	Austria	"Merci, Chérie"	Udo Jürgens	Udo Jürgens; Thomas Hörbiger	
1967	United Kingdom	"Puppet on a String"	Sandie Shaw	Bill Martin; Phil Coulter	
1968	Spain	"La La La"	Massiel	Manuel de la Calva; Ramón Arcusa (Dúo Dinámico)	
1969	Spain	"Vivo cantando"	Salomé	María José de Cerato; Aniano Alcalde	
1969	United Kingdom	"Boom Bang-a-Bang"	Lulu	Alan Moorhouse; Peter Warne	
1969	Netherlands	"De troubadour"	Lenny Kuhr	David Hartsema; Lenny Kuhr	
1969	France	"Un jour, un enfant"	Frida Boccara	Émile Stern; Eddy Marnay	
1970	Ireland	"All Kinds of Everything"	Dana	Derry Lindsay; Jackie Smith	
1971	Monaco	"Un banc, un arbre, une rue"	Séverine	Jean-Pierre Bourtayre; Yves Dessca	
1972	Luxembourg	"Après toi"	Vicky Leandros	Leo Leandros; Klaus Munro; Yves Dessca	
1973	Luxembourg	"Tu te reconnaîtras"	Anne-Marie David	Claude Morgan; Vline Buggy	
1974	Sweden	"Waterloo"	ABBA	Benny Andersson; Björn Ulvaeus; Stig Anderson	
1975	Netherlands	"Ding-a-dong"	Teach-In	Dick Bakker; Will Luikinga; Eddy Ouwens	
1976	United Kingdom	"Save Your Kisses for Me"	Brotherhood of Man	Tony Hiller; Lee Sheriden; Martin Lee	
1977	France	"L'Oiseau et l'Enfant"	Marie Myriam	Jean-Paul Cara; Joe Gracy	
1978	Israel	"A-Ba-Ni-Bi" (א-ב-ני-בי)	Izhar Cohen and the Alphabeta	Nurit Hirsh; Ehud Manor	
1979	Israel	"Hallelujah" (הללויה)	Milk and Honey	Kobi Oshrat; Shimrit Orr	
1980	Ireland	"What's Another Year"	Johnny Logan	Shay Healy	
1981	United Kingdom	"Making Your Mind Up"	Bucks Fizz	Andy Hill; John Danter	
1982	Germany	"Ein bißchen Frieden"	Nicole	Ralph Siegel; Bernd Meinunger	
1983	Luxembourg	"Si la vie est cadeau"	Corinne Hermès	Jean-Pierre Millers; Alain Garcia	
1984	Sweden	"Diggi-Loo Diggi-Ley"	Herreys	Torgny Söderberg; Britt Lindeborg	
1985	Norway	"La det swinge"	Bobbysocks!	Rolf Løvland	
1986	Belgium	"J'aime la vie"	Sandra Kim	Jean-Paul Furnémont; Angelo Crisci; Rosario Marino Atria	
1987	Ireland	"Hold Me Now"	Johnny Logan	Johnny Logan	
1988	Switzerland	"Ne partez pas sans moi"	Céline Dion	Nella Martinetti; Atilla Şereftuğ	
1989	Yugoslavia	"Rock Me"	Riva	Rajko Dujmić; Stevo Cvikić	
1990	Italy	"Insieme: 1992"	Toto Cutugno	Toto Cutugno	
1991	Sweden	"Fångad av en stormvind"	Carola	Stephan Berg	
1992	Ireland	"Why Me?"	Linda Martin	Johnny Logan	
1993	Ireland	"In Your Eyes"	Niamh Kavanagh	Jimmy Walsh	
1994	Ireland	"Rock 'n' Roll Kids"	Paul Harrington and Charlie McGettigan	Brendan Graham	
1995	Norway	"Nocturne"	Secret Garden	Rolf Løvland; Petter Skavlan	
1996	Ireland	"The Voice"	Eimear Quinn	Brendan Graham	
1997	United Kingdom	"Love Shine a Light"	Katrina and the Waves	Kimberley Rew	
1998	Israel	"Diva" (דיווה)	Dana International	Svika Pick; Yoav Ginai	
1999	Sweden	"Take Me to Your Heaven"	Charlotte Nilsson	Lars Diedricson; Gert Lengstrand; Marcos Ubeda	
2000	Denmark	"Fly on the Wings of Love"	Olsen Brothers	Jørgen Olsen	
2001	Estonia	"Everybody"	Tanel Padar, Dave Benton and 2XL	Ivar Must; Maian-Anna Kärmas	
2002	Latvia	"I Wanna"	Marie N	Marija Naumova; Marats Samauskis	
2003	Turkey	"Everyway That I Can"	Sertab Erener	Demir Demirkan; Sertab Erener	
2004	Ukraine	"Wild Dances"	Ruslana	Ruslana Lyzhychko; Alexandr Ksenofontov	
2005	Greece	"My Number One"	Helena Paparizou	Manos Psaltakis; Christos Dantis; Natalia Germanou	
2006	Finland	"Hard Rock Hallelujah"	Lordi	Mr Lordi	
2007	Serbia	"Molitva" (Молитва)	Marija Šerifović	Vladimir Graić; Saša Milošević Mare	
2008	Russia	"Believe"	Dima Bilan	Jim Beanz; Dima Bilan	
2009	Norway	"Fairytale"	Alexander Rybak	Alexander Rybak	
2010	Germany	"Satellite"	Lena	Julie Frost; John Gordon	
2011	Azerbaijan	"Running Scared"	Ell and Nikki	Stefan Örn; Sandra Bjurman; Iain James Farquharson	
2012	Sweden	"Euphoria"	Loreen	Thomas G:son; Peter Boström	
2013	Denmark	"Only Teardrops"	Emmelie de Forest	Lise Cabble; Julia Fabrin Jakobsen; Thomas Stengaard	
2014	Austria	"Rise Like a Phoenix"	Conchita Wurst	Charlie Mason; Joey Patulka; Ali Zuckowski; Julian Maas	
2015	Sweden	"Heroes"	Måns Zelmerlöw	Anton Hård af Segerstad; Joy Deb; Linnea Deb	
2016	Ukraine	"1944"	Jamala	Jamala	
2017	Portugal	"Amar pelos dois"	Salvador Sobral	Luísa Sobral	
2018	Israel	"Toy"	Netta	Doron Medalie; Stav Beger	
2019	Netherlands	"Arcade"	Duncan Laurence	Duncan Laurence; Joel Sjöö; Wouter Hardy; Will Knox	
2020	Contest cancelled due to the COVID-19 pandemic				
2021	Italy	"Zitti e buoni"	Måneskin	Damiano David; Ethan Torchio; Thomas Raggi; Victoria De Angelis	
2022	Ukraine	"Stefania" (Стефанія)	Kalush Orchestra	Ihor Didenchuk; Ivan Klymenko; Oleh Psiuk; Tymofii Muzychuk; Vitalii Duzhyk	
2023	Sweden	"Tattoo"	Loreen	Jimmy "Joker" Thörnfeldt; Jimmy Jansson; Lorine Talhaoui; Moa "Cazzi Opeia" Carlebecker; Peter Boström; Thomas G:son	
2024	Switzerland	"The Code"	Nemo	Benjamin Alasu; Lasse Midtsian Nymann; Linda Dale; Nemo Mettler	
2025	Austria	"Wasted Love"	JJ	Johannes Pietsch; Teodora Špirić; Thomas Thurner	
2026	Bulgaria	"Bangaranga"	Dara	Darina Yotova; Anne Judith Wik; Cristian Tarcea; Dimitris Kontopoulos	

== Performers and songwriters with multiple wins ==
The following individuals have won the Eurovision Song Contest as a performer or songwriter more than once.

Individuals with multiple Eurovision Song Contest wins
Wins	Name	Wins as performer	Wins as songwriter
3	Johnny Logan	1980, 1987	1987, 1992
2	Willy van Hemert	—N/a	1957, 1959
2	Yves Dessca	—N/a	1971, 1972
2	Brendan Graham	—N/a	1994, 1996
2	Rolf Løvland	1995	1985, 1995
2	Loreen	2012, 2023	2023
2	Peter Boström	—N/a	2012, 2023
2	Thomas G:son	—N/a	2012, 2023

== Observations ==
Eleven Eurovision winning songs (alongside three non-winners) were featured at the special concert Congratulations: 50 Years of the Eurovision Song Contest in 2005, in which "Waterloo" by ABBA was voted the most popular song of the contest's first fifty years.

Ireland and Sweden have won seven times, more than any other country. Ireland also won the contest for three consecutive years (1992, 1993, and 1994), the only country to ever do so. Three countries have won twice in a row: Spain (1968 and 1969), Luxembourg (1972 and 1973) and Israel (1978 and 1979). Serbia is the only country to win with its debut entry (in 2007). (Note: Although Serbia was part of Yugoslavia and Serbia and Montenegro when they competed in the contest; for comparison, Switzerland won the inaugural edition in 1956 with the second song that presented this evening.) By contrast, Portugal holds the record for waiting the longest to achieve their first win, doing so in 2017; 53 years after their first appearance in the contest. Austria holds the record for longest wait in between wins, having won for the first time in 1966 and a second time in 2014. Under the voting system used between 1975 and 2015, the winner of the contest was decided by the final voting country on eleven occasions. (Note: Those occasions were in 1979, 1980, 1981, 1984, 1988, 1991, 1993, 1998, 2002, and 2003.)

Changes to the voting system, including a steady growth in the number of countries participating and voting, means that the points earned are not comparable across the decades. "Amar pelos dois" by Salvador Sobral holds the record of the highest number of points in the contest's history, earning 758 points in 2017. "Bangaranga" by DARA holds the largest margin of victory in absolute points, a 173-point cushion over second place in 2026. "Non ho l'età" by Gigliola Cinquetti holds the record for largest victory by percentage, scoring almost three times as many as second place (49 points compared with 17 by the runner-up) in the 1964 contest. The lowest winning score is the 18 points (of the 160 total votes cast by 16 countries) scored by each of the four winning countries in 1969.

Under the voting system used from 1975 until 2015, in which each country gives maximum points to its first place choice, "Euphoria" by Loreen won the 2012 contest with the most ever first place votes earned, receiving first place votes from 18 of 41 countries (excluding themselves). The 1976 winner, "Save Your Kisses for Me" by Brotherhood of Man, holds the record of the highest average score per participating country, with an average of 9.65 points received per country. The 2011 winner, "Running Scared" by Ell and Nikki, holds the lowest average score for a winning song under that system, receiving 5.14 points per country.

Around two-thirds of the winning songs were performed in the second half of the final. According to the official statistics, until 2019, only 34.3% of the winning songs were performed in the first half, including 3 of the 4 winners in 1969. The only song to win without being clearly in one half or the other was the Israeli entry "Hallelujah" by Milk and Honey in 1979, which was drawn 10th out of 19 songs. Between 2005 and 2013, all the winning songs were performed in the second half of the final's running order.

The United Kingdom has finished second sixteen times at Eurovision (most recently in 2022), more than any other country. France has finished third and fourth eight times at Eurovision (most recently respectively in 1981 and in 2024), and Sweden has finished fifth nine times at Eurovision (most recently in 2019). The country with the most top three places that has never won the contest is Malta, having finished second in 2002 and 2005 and third in 1992 and 1998. Another island nation, Iceland, has also finished second twice, in 1999 and 2009. With Portugal achieving its first win in 2017, Malta now also holds the record for longest wait for a first win, having first entered the contest in 1971 (although Cyprus has more winless appearances, with 36 since debuting in 1981, due to Malta taking a break from 1976 through 1990). Spain holds the current record for longest drought by a winning country, having last won in 1969. They are followed by France (1977) and Belgium (1986).

There is no official runner-up for two of the contests – 1956 and 1969. In 1956 only the winner, Switzerland, was announced. In 1969, four songs shared first place by achieving the same number of points; fifth place was achieved by Switzerland, which is not considered an official runner-up, because of the draw for first place.

=== Discrepancies between the jury and televote ===
Since the reintroduction of the juries alongside televoting in 2009, the jury and the televote awarded the most points to the same entry on seven occasions: in 2009, 2010, 2012, 2013, 2014, 2017 and 2026. Two winners have won without placing first in either area: Ukraine's "1944" by Jamala in 2016, which finished second in the jury vote behind Australia and second in the televote behind Russia, and the Netherlands' "Arcade" by Duncan Laurence in 2019, which placed third behind North Macedonia and Sweden in the jury vote, and second behind Norway in the televote.

Sweden won both the combined vote and jury vote in 2015 and 2023, represented by "Heroes" by Måns Zelmerlöw and "Tattoo" by Loreen, respectively. However, in the televote, Sweden came third behind Italy and Russia in 2015, and second behind Finland in 2023. Both Switzerland's "The Code" by Nemo in 2024 and Austria's "Wasted Love" by JJ in 2025 won the combined vote and jury vote, but in 2024, Switzerland placed fifth in the televote behind Croatia, Israel, Ukraine, and France. Meanwhile, in 2025, Austria placed fourth in the televote behind Israel, Estonia and Sweden.

Azerbaijan's "Running Scared" by Ell and Nikki in 2011, Israel's "Toy" by Netta in 2018, Italy's "Zitti e buoni" by Måneskin in 2021 and Ukraine's "Stefania" by Kalush Orchestra in 2022 all won both the combined vote and televote. However, in the jury vote, Azerbaijan came second behind Italy in 2011, Israel came third behind Austria and Sweden in 2018, Italy came fourth behind Switzerland, France and Malta in 2021, and Ukraine came fourth behind the United Kingdom, Sweden and Spain in 2022.

Winning entries by jury and televote placement
Year	Country	Jury place	Televote place	Ref.
2009	Norway	1st	1st	
2010	Germany	1st	1st	
2011	Azerbaijan	2nd	1st	
2012	Sweden	1st	1st	
2013	Denmark	1st	1st	
2014	Austria	1st	1st	
2015	Sweden	1st	3rd	
2016	Ukraine	2nd	2nd	
2017	Portugal	1st	1st	
2018	Israel	3rd	1st	
2019	Netherlands	3rd	2nd	
2021	Italy	4th	1st	
2022	Ukraine	4th	1st	
2023	Sweden	1st	2nd	
2024	Switzerland	1st	5th	
2025	Austria	1st	4th	
2026	Bulgaria	1st	1st	

== Winners by country ==
Map showing each country's number of Eurovision wins up to and including 2026.

The first country to repeat win was the Netherlands, completed in 1959. France was the first country to win three times (completed in 1962), four times (completed in 1969), and five times (completed in 1977). Ireland was the first country to win six times (completed in 1994) and seven times (completed in 1996). The first country to win two consecutive contests was Spain, in 1968 and 1969. The first and to date only country to win three consecutive contests was Ireland, in 1992, 1993, and 1994.

Table key
†	Inactive – countries whose broadcaster had participated in the past but did not compete in the most recent contest, and have not announced its participation in the upcoming contest
◇	Ineligible – countries whose broadcaster are no longer part of the EBU and are therefore ineligible to participate
‡	Former – countries which previously participated but no longer exist

Eurovision Song Contest wins by country
Wins	Country	Years	Ref.
7	Ireland †	1970, 1980, 1987, 1992, 1993, 1994, 1996	
7	Sweden	1974, 1984, 1991, 1999, 2012, 2015, 2023	
5	France	1958, 1960, 1962, 1969, 1977	
5	Luxembourg	1961, 1965, 1972, 1973, 1983	
5	United Kingdom	1967, 1969, 1976, 1981, 1997	
5	Netherlands †	1957, 1959, 1969, 1975, 2019	
4	Israel	1978, 1979, 1998, 2018	
3	Norway	1985, 1995, 2009	
3	Denmark	1963, 2000, 2013	
3	Italy	1964, 1990, 2021	
3	Ukraine	2004, 2016, 2022	
3	Switzerland	1956, 1988, 2024	
3	Austria	1966, 2014, 2025	
2	Spain †	1968, 1969	
2	Germany	1982, 2010	
1	Monaco †	1971	
1	Belgium	1986	
1	Yugoslavia ‡	1989	
1	Estonia	2001	
1	Latvia	2002	
1	Turkey †	2003	
1	Greece	2005	
1	Finland	2006	
1	Serbia	2007	
1	Russia ◇	2008	
1	Azerbaijan	2011	
1	Portugal	2017	
1	Bulgaria	2026	

1969 is in italics to indicate the joint (four-way) win.

== Gallery ==
=== Performers ===
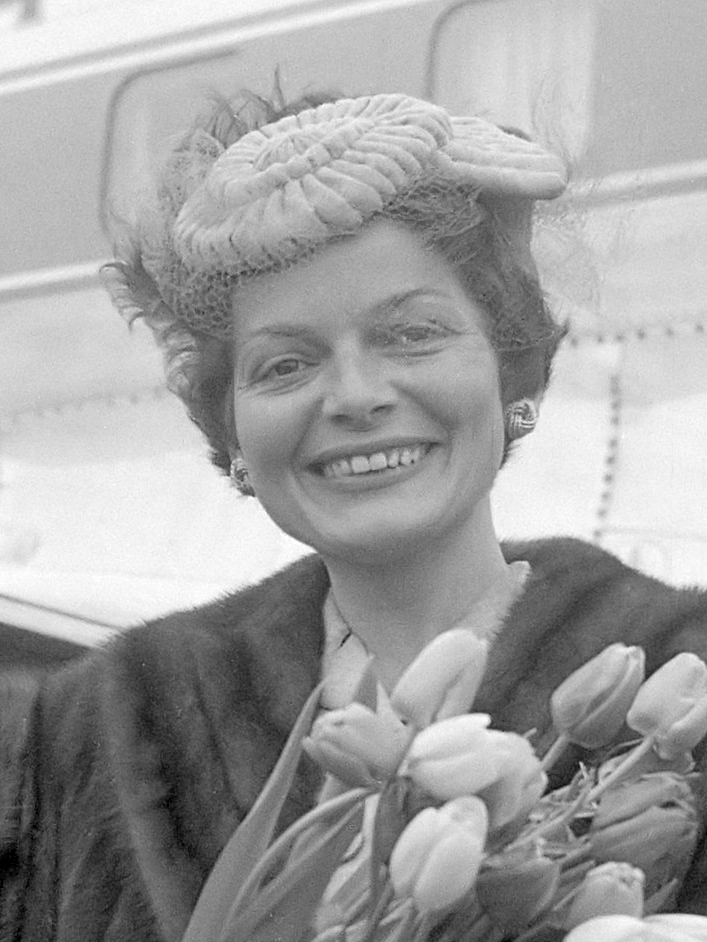
Lys Assia, winner of the inaugural 1956 contest for Switzerland.

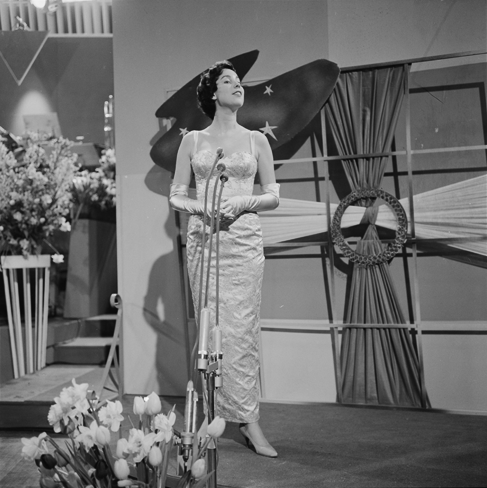
Corry Brokken, winner of the 1957 contest for the Netherlands.

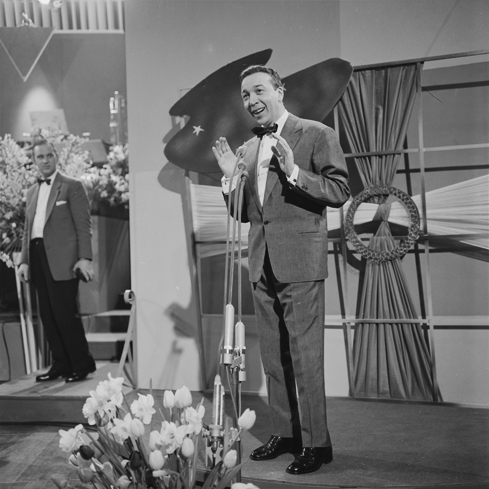
André Claveau, winner of the 1958 contest for France.

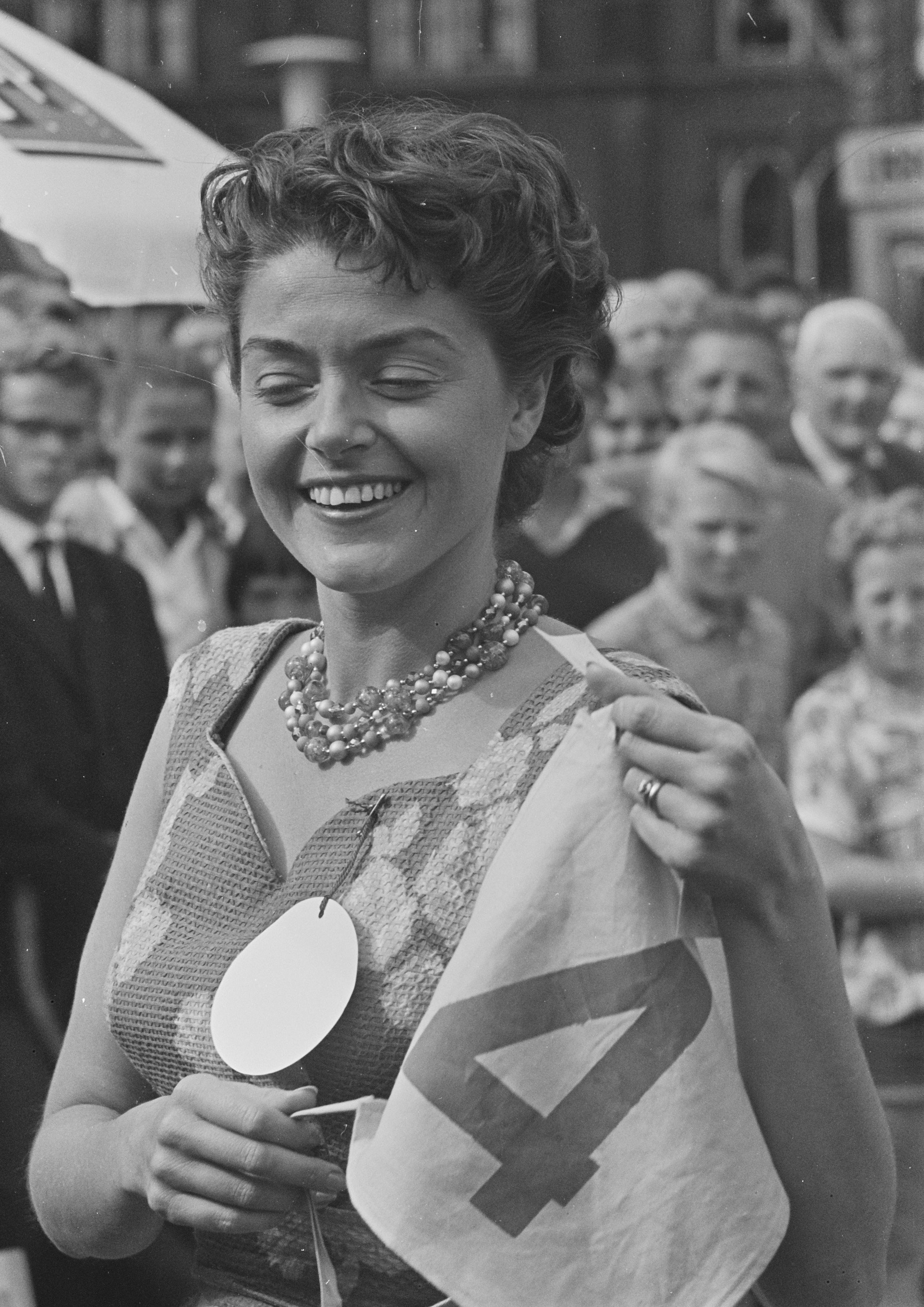
Teddy Scholten, winner of the 1959 contest for the Netherlands.

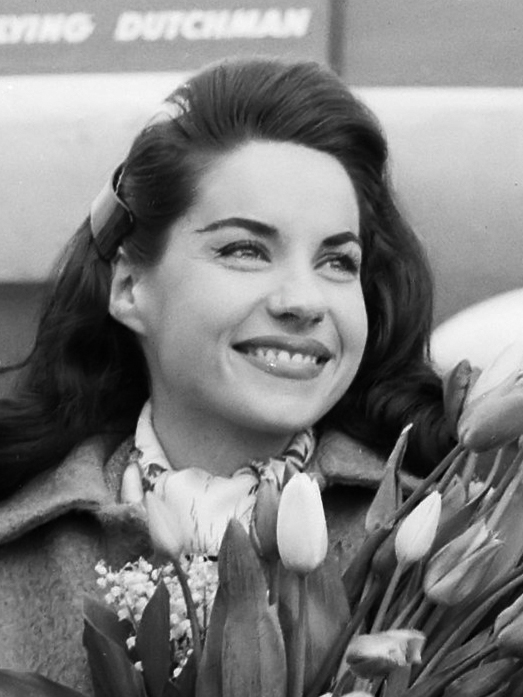
Jacqueline Boyer, winner of the 1960 contest for France.

Jean-Claude Pascal, winner of the 1961 contest for Luxembourg.

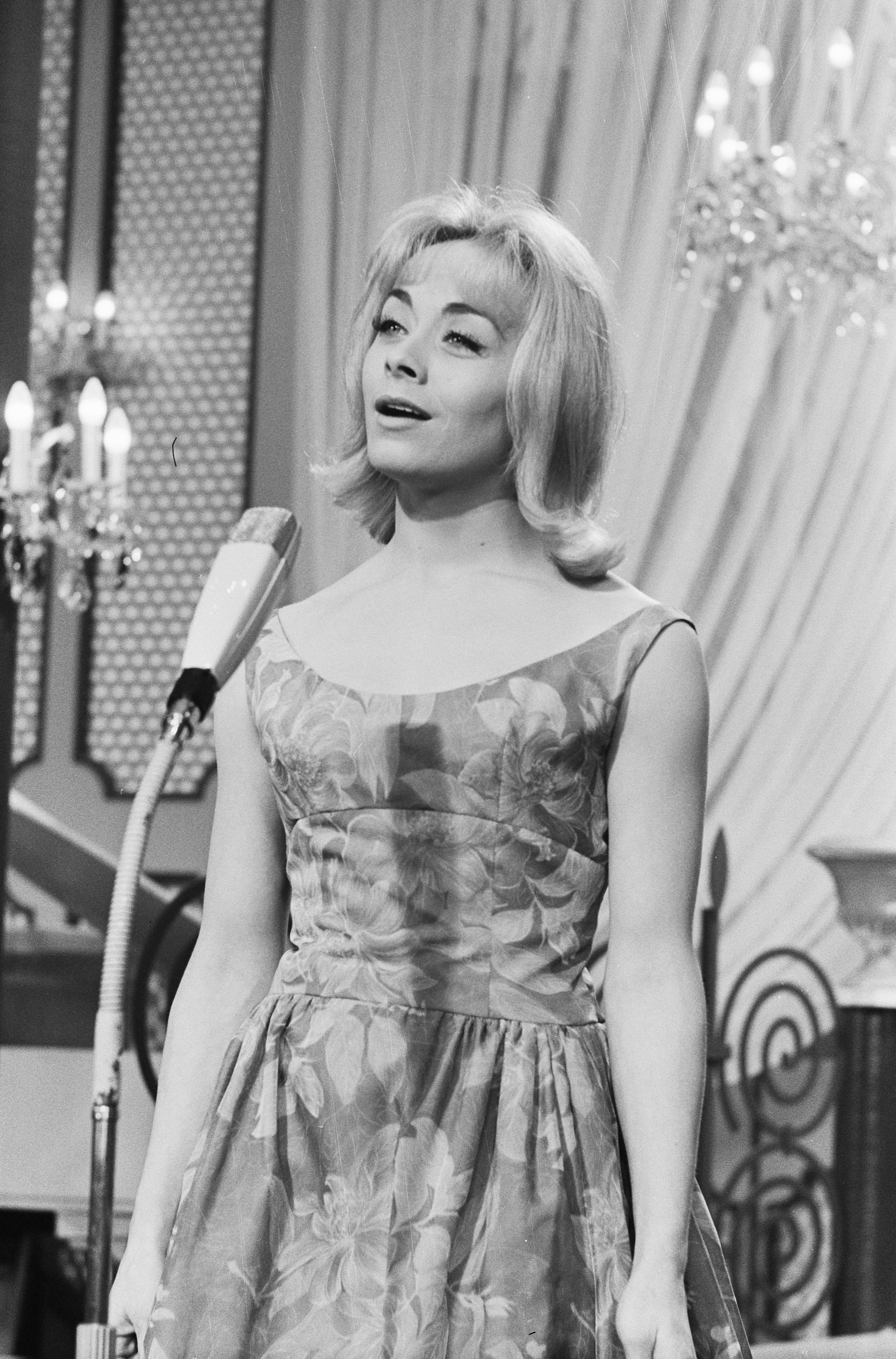
Isabelle Aubret, winner of the 1962 contest for France.

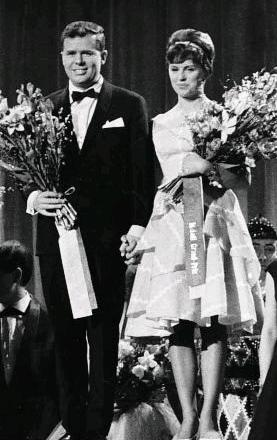
Jørgen & Grethe Ingmann, winners of the 1963 contest for Denmark.

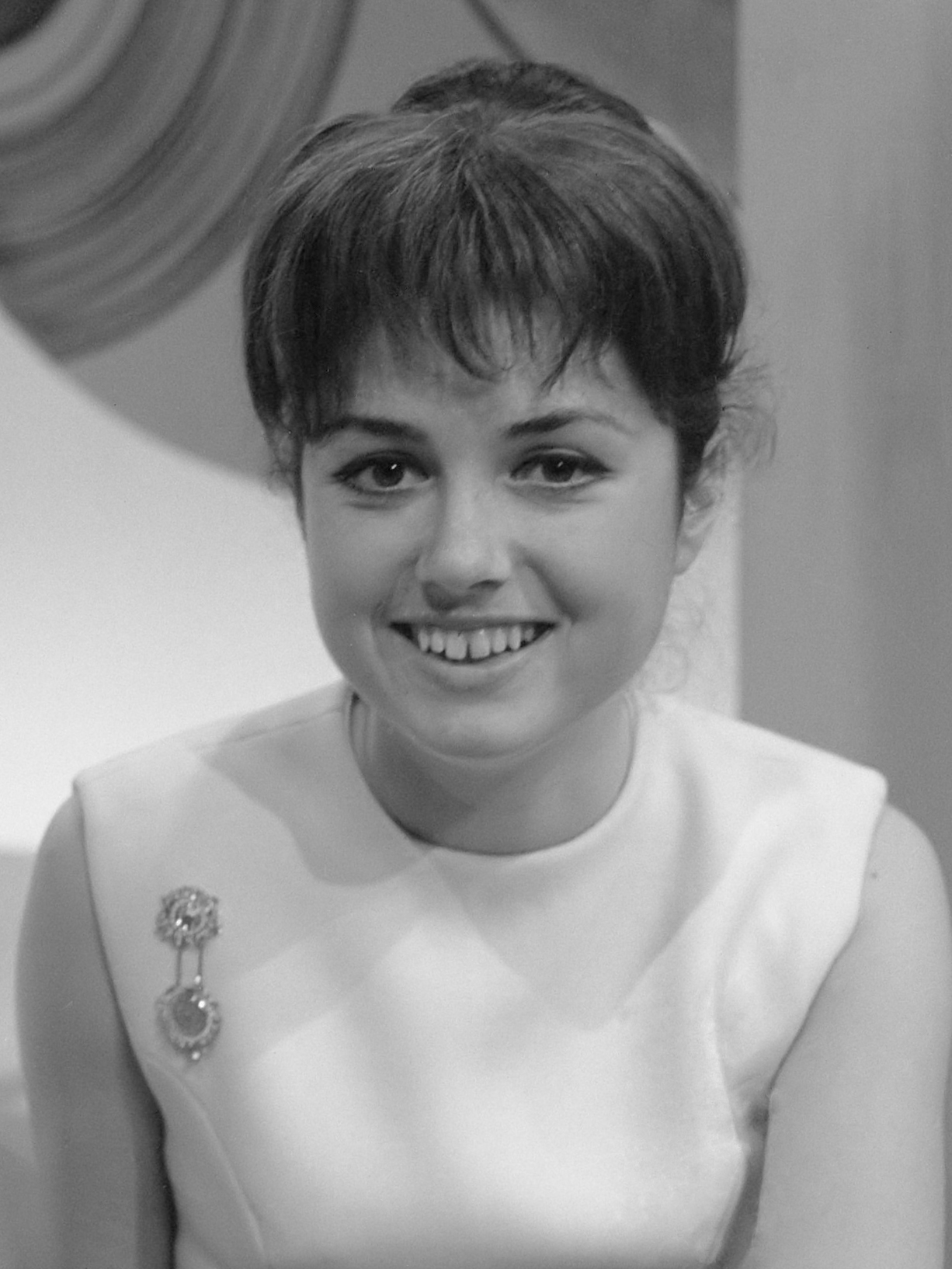
Gigliola Cinquetti, winner of the 1964 contest for Italy.

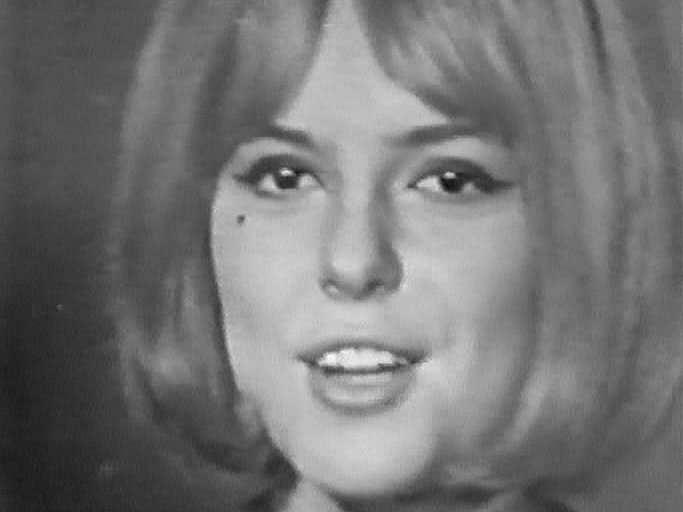
France Gall, winner of the 1965 contest for Luxembourg.

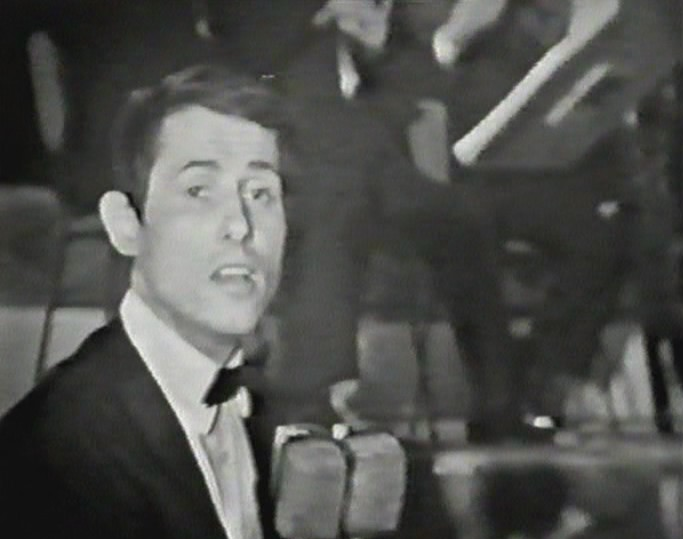
Udo Jürgens, winner of the 1966 contest for Austria.

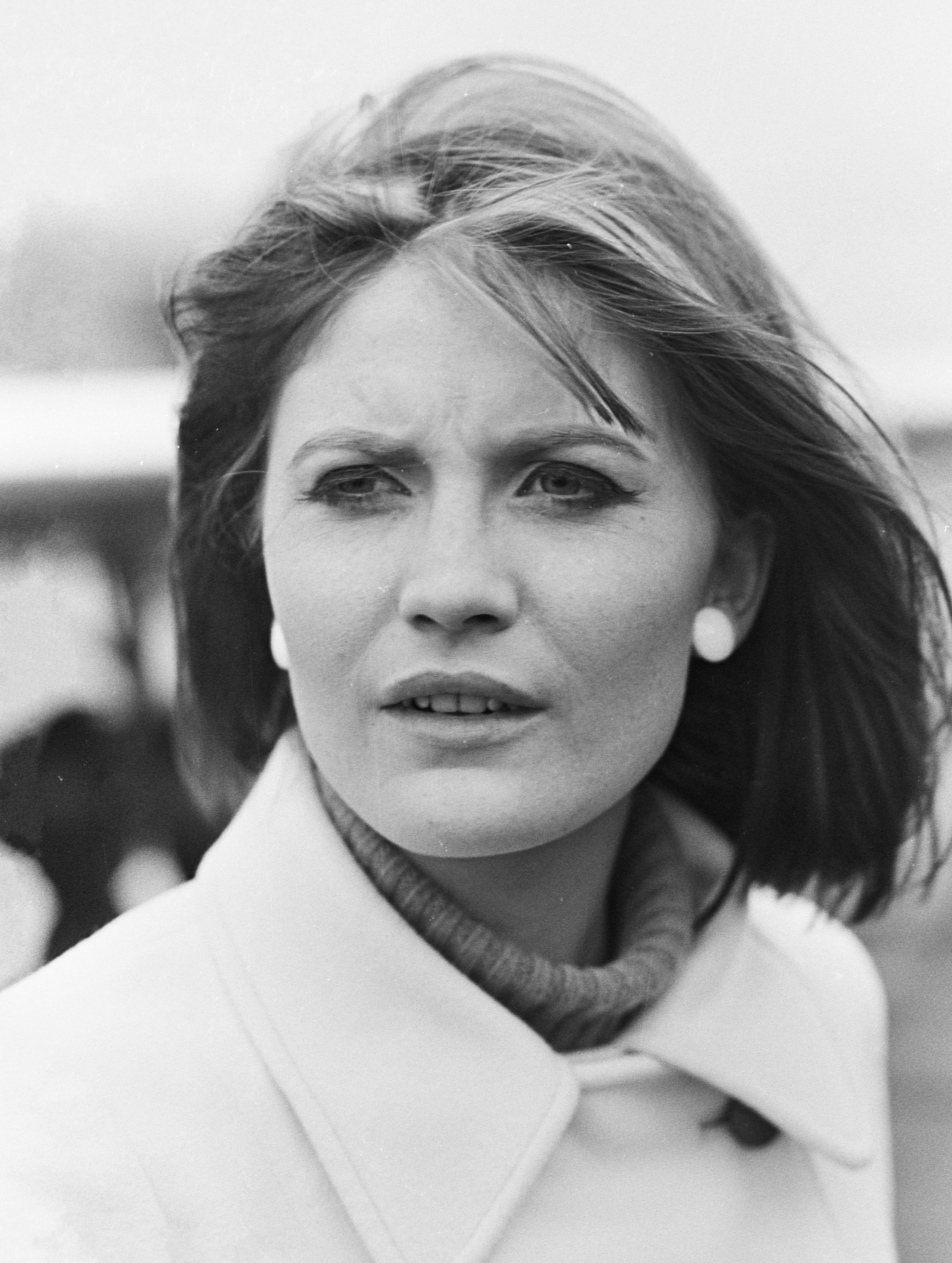
Sandie Shaw, winner of the 1967 contest for the United Kingdom.

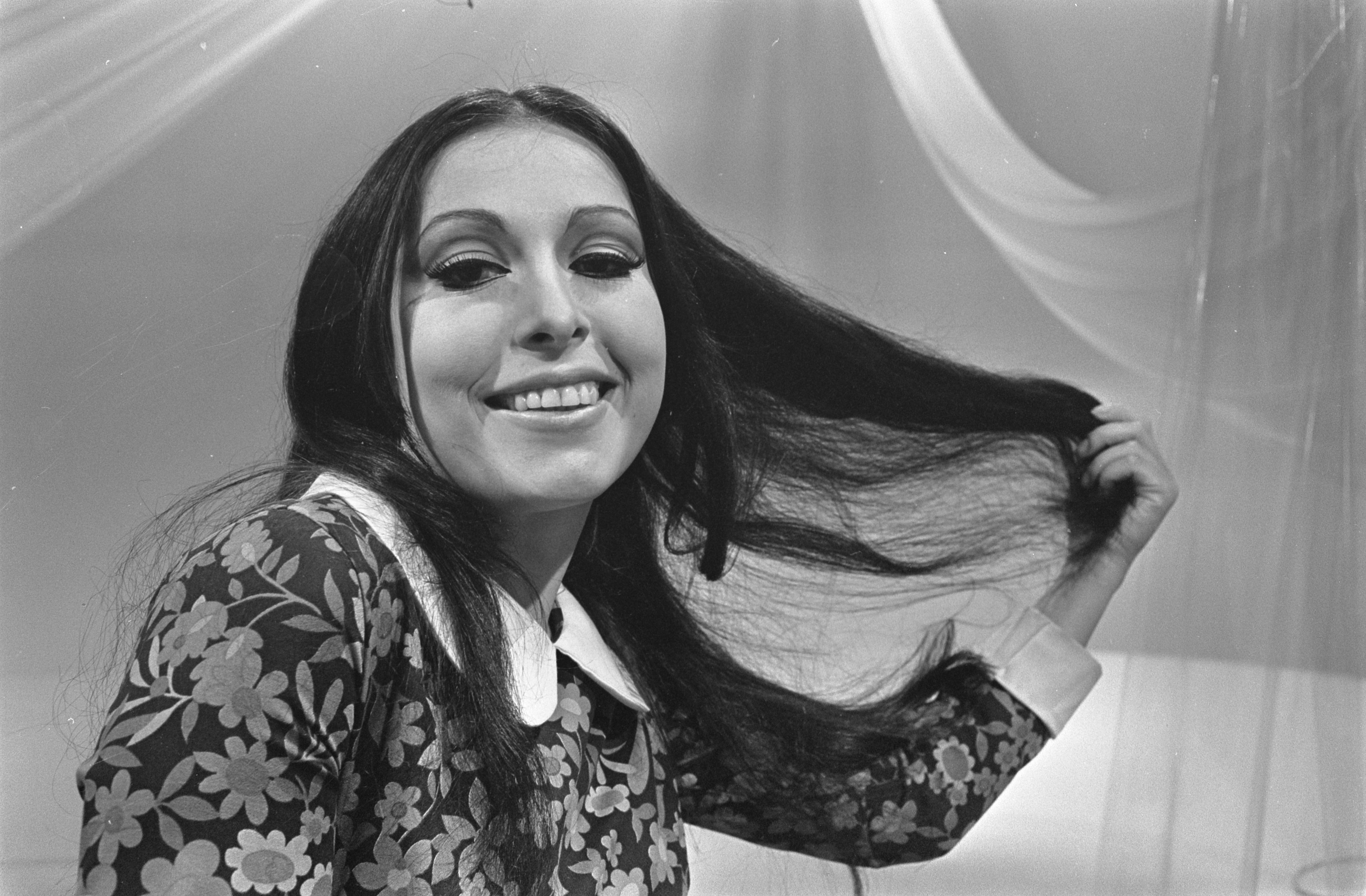
Massiel, winner of the 1968 contest for Spain.

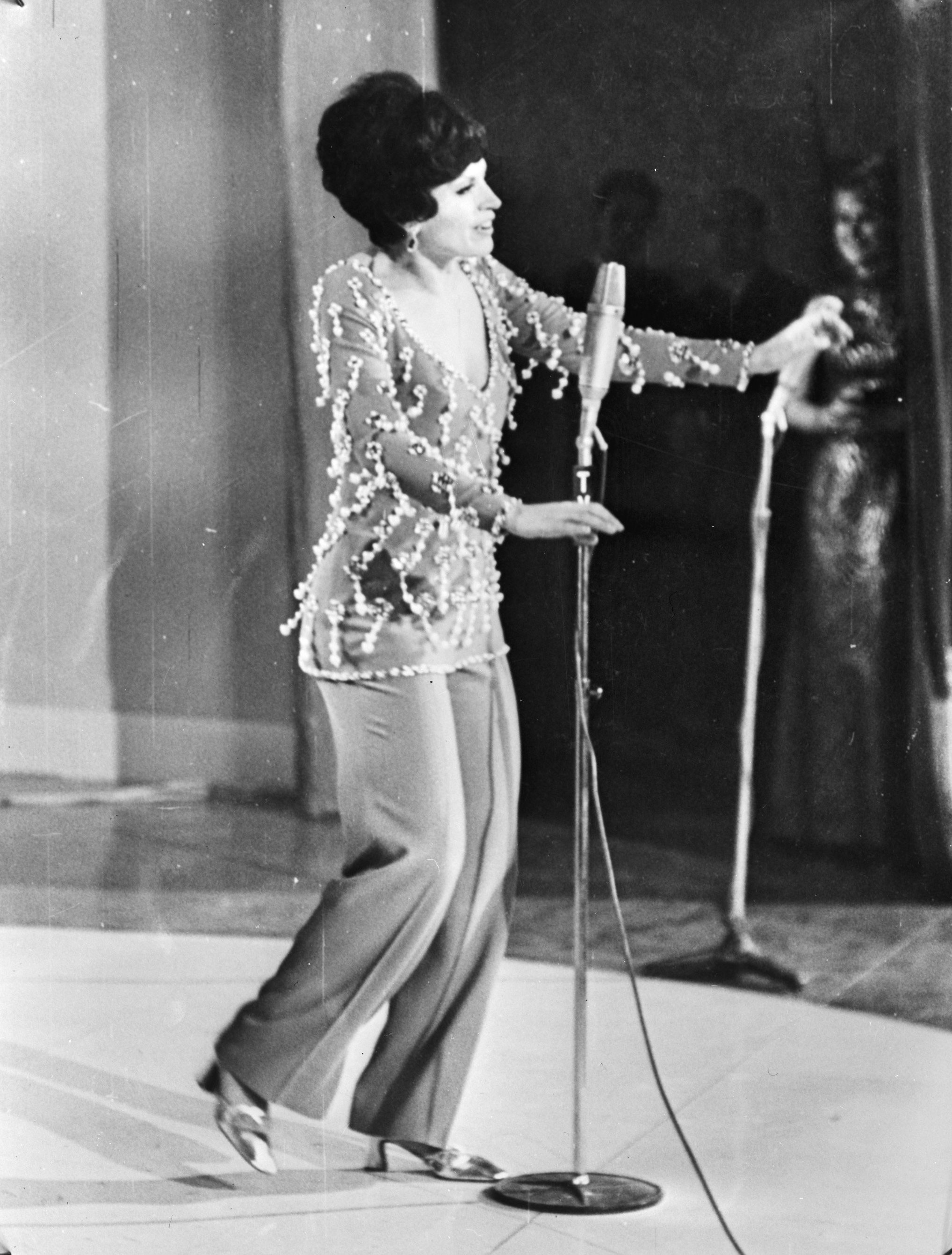
Salomé, one of the four winners of the 1969 contest for Spain.

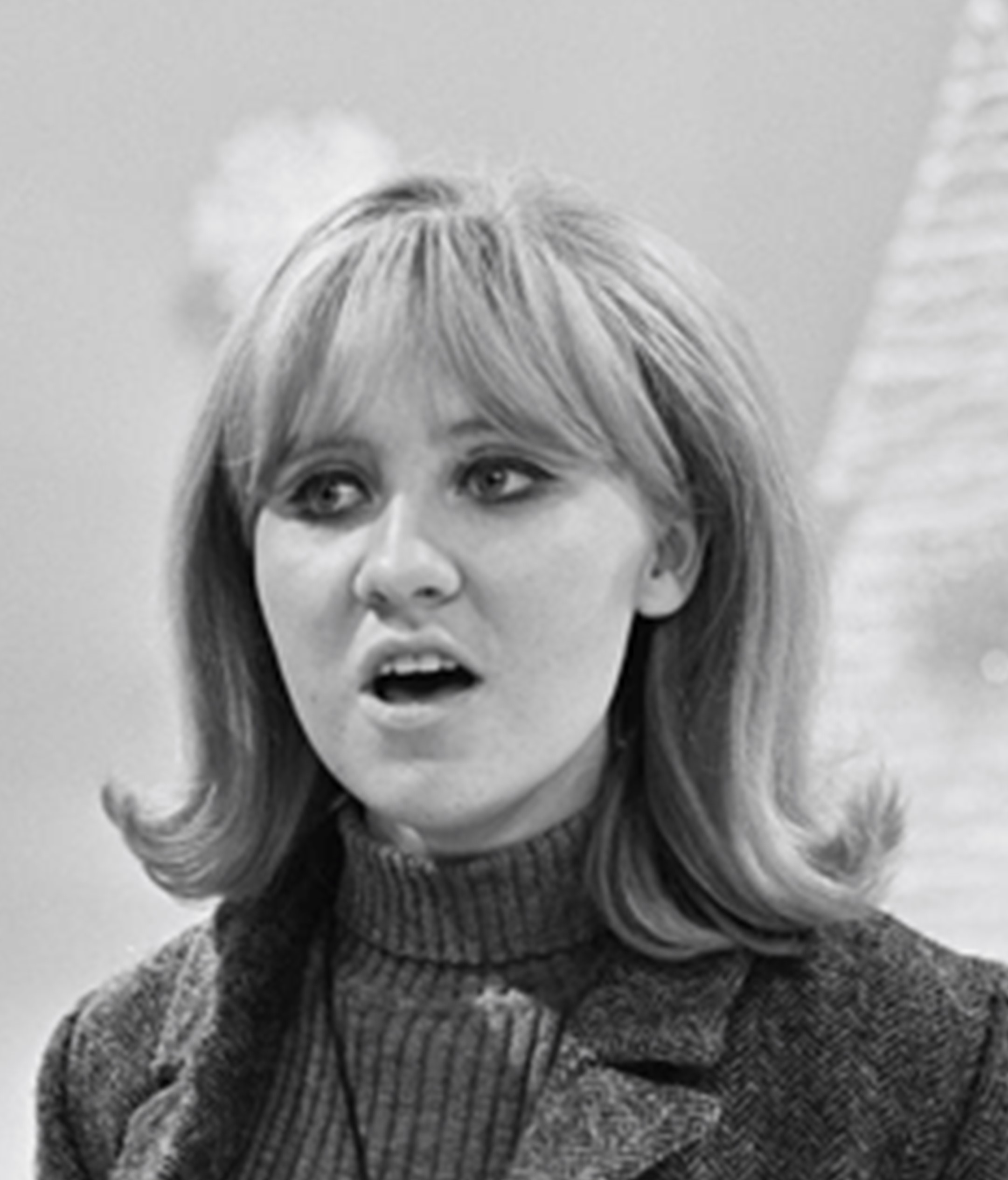
Lulu, one of the four winners of the 1969 contest for the United Kingdom.

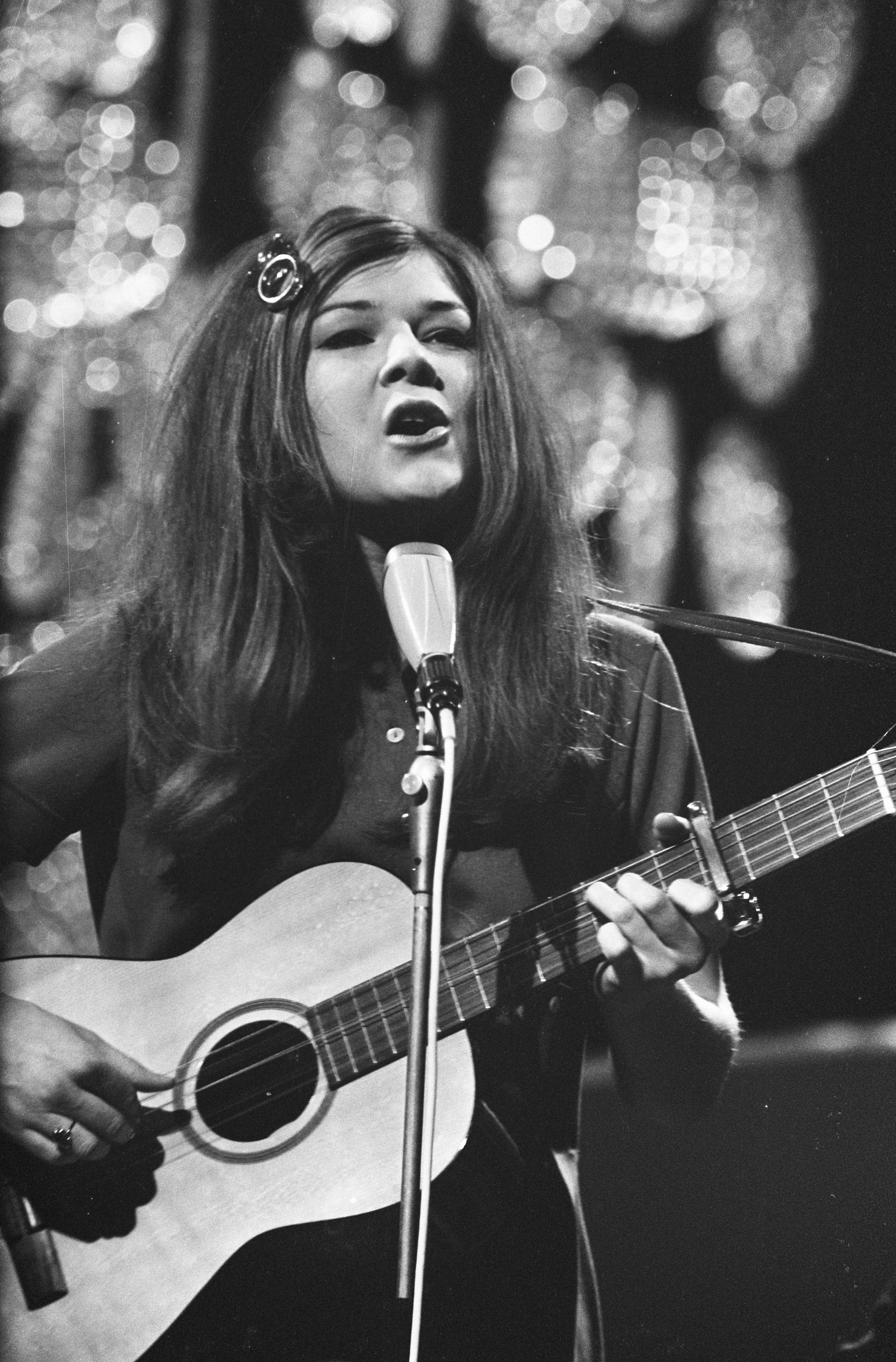
Lenny Kuhr, one of the four winners of the 1969 contest for the Netherlands.

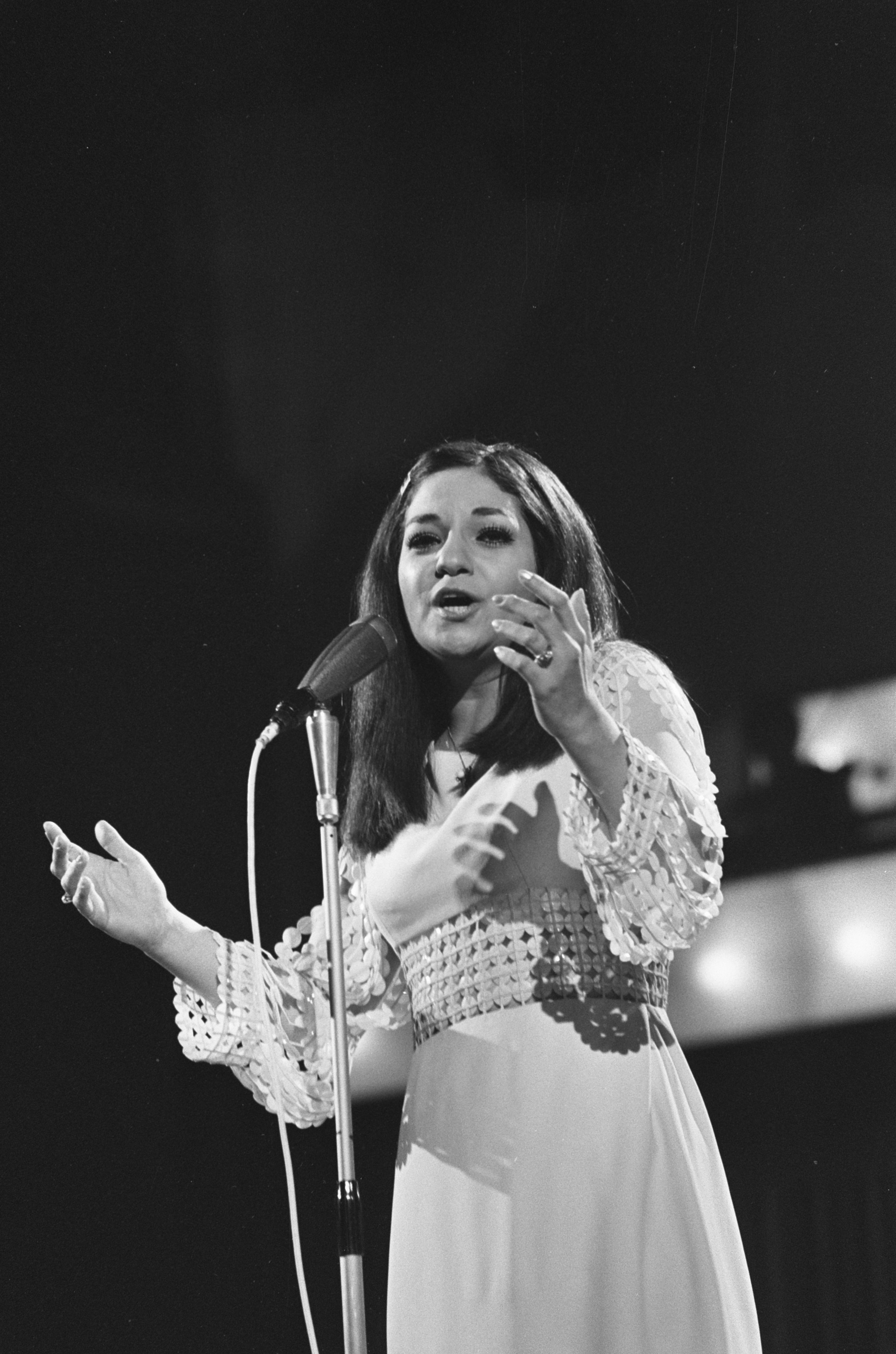
Frida Boccara, one of the four winners of the 1969 contest for France.

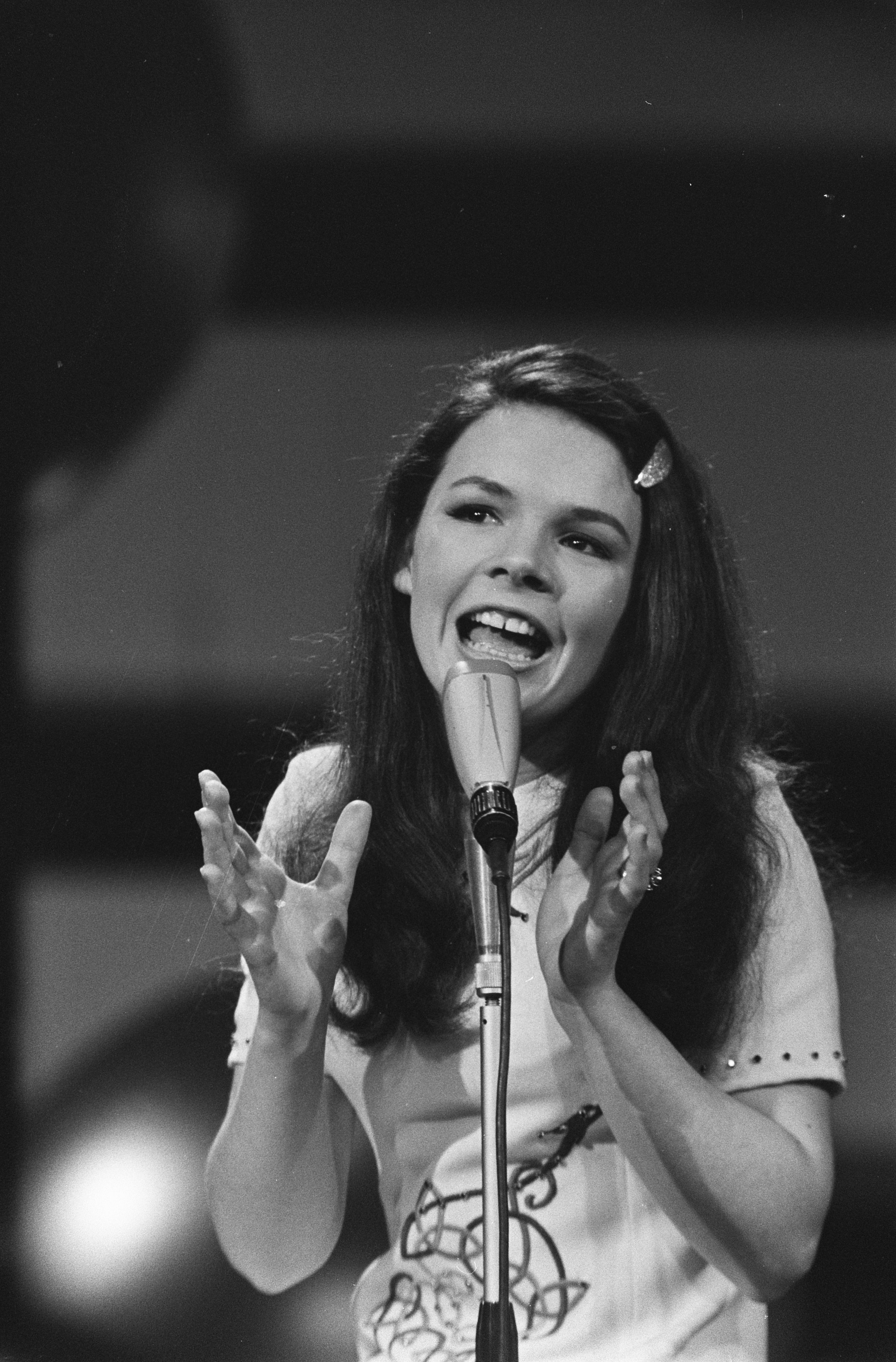
Dana, winner of the 1970 contest for Ireland.

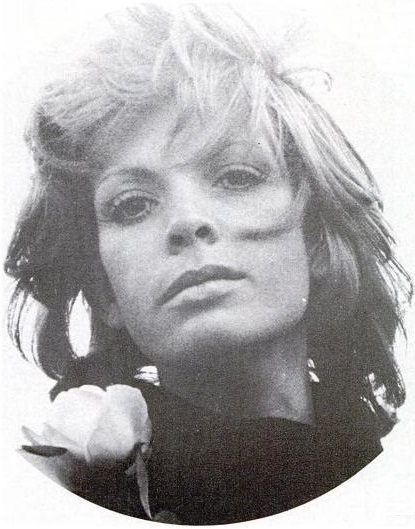
Séverine, winner of the 1971 contest for Monaco.

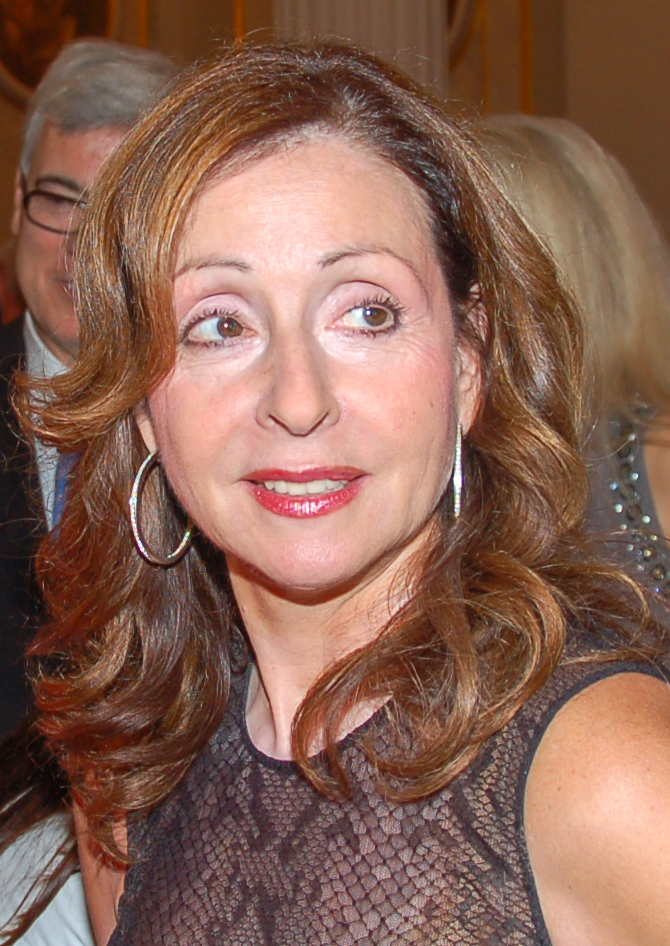
Vicky Leandros, winner of the 1972 contest for Luxembourg.

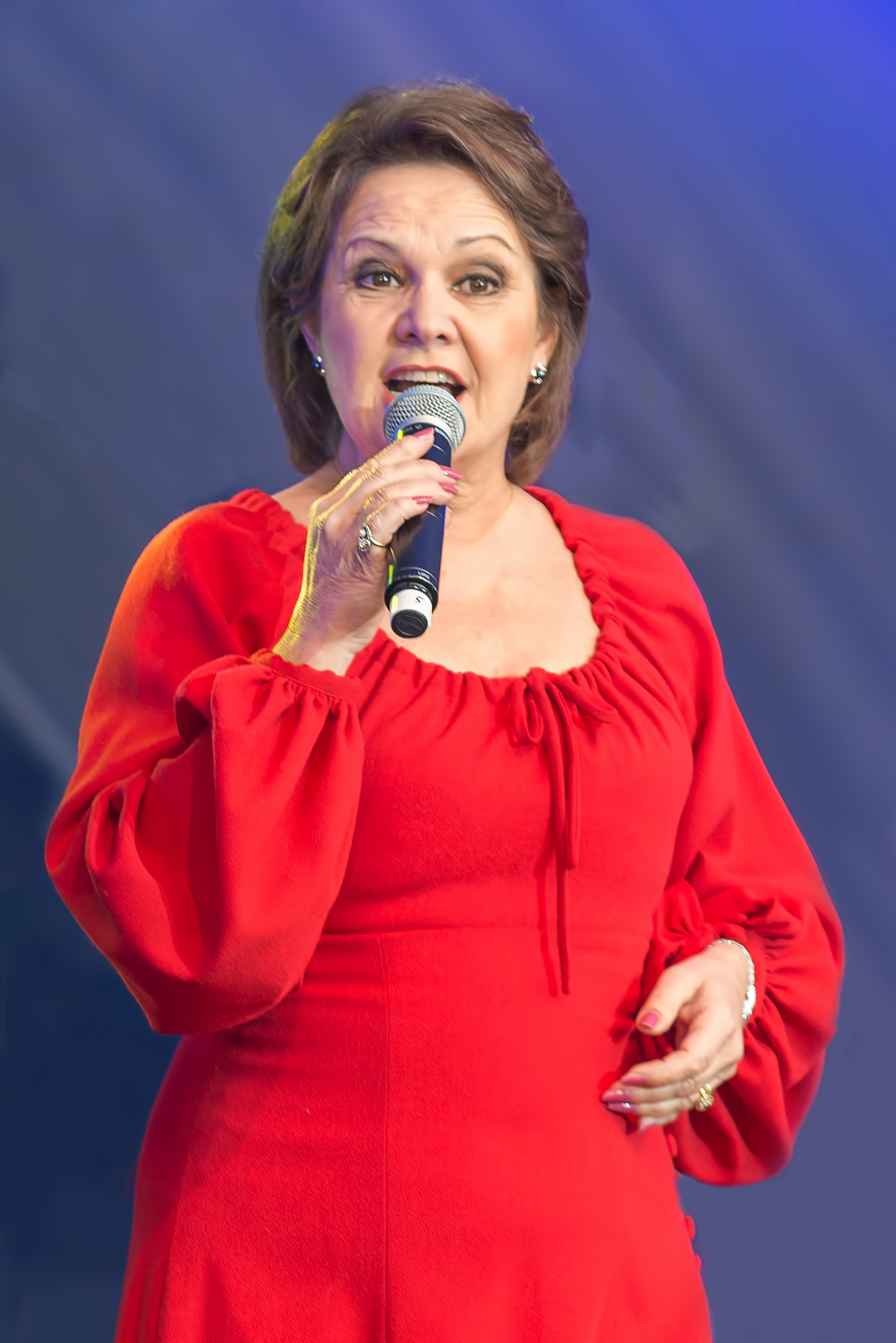
Anne-Marie David, winner of the 1973 contest for Luxembourg.

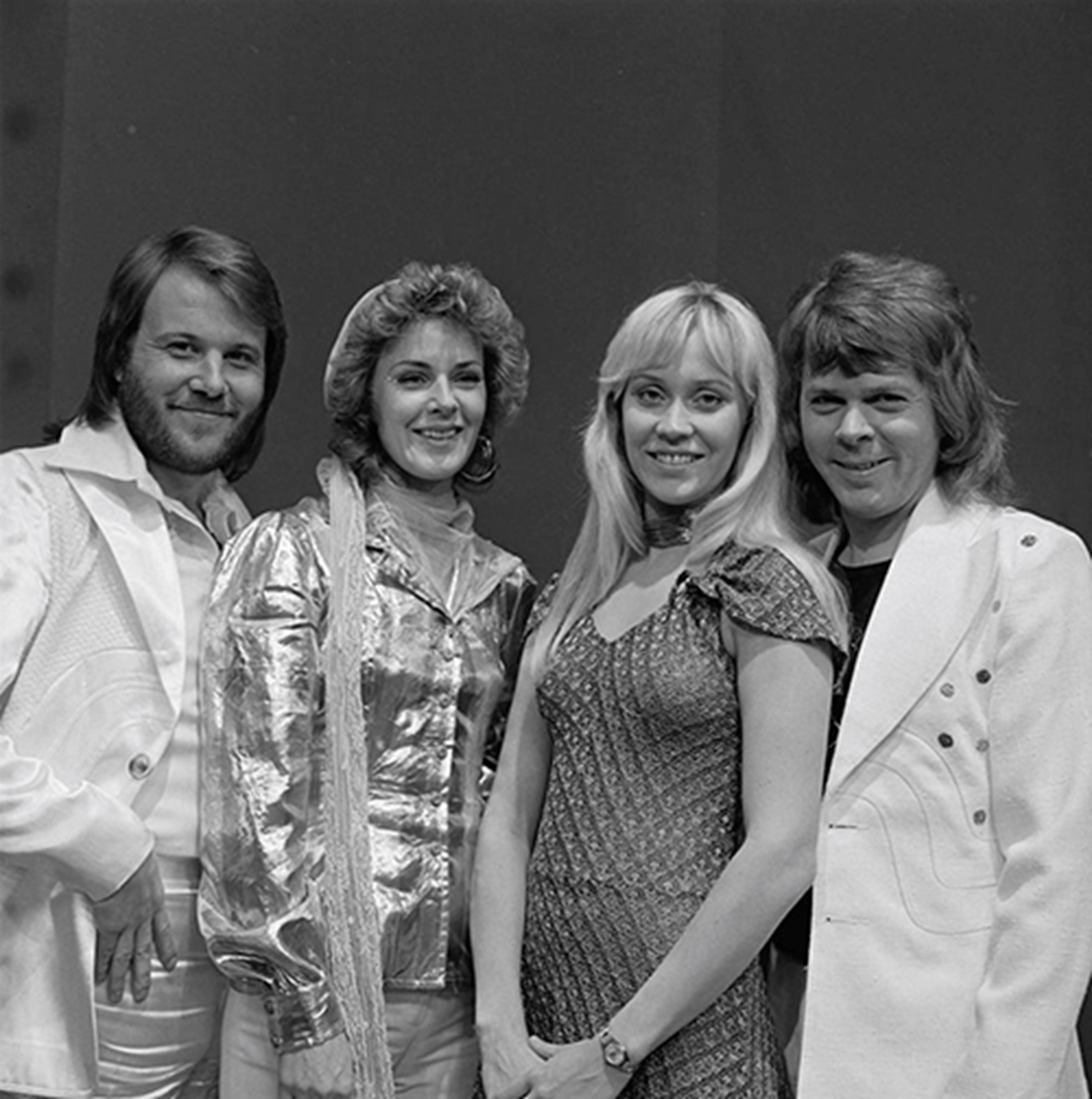
ABBA, winners of the 1974 and 2005's 50th anniversary contests for Sweden.

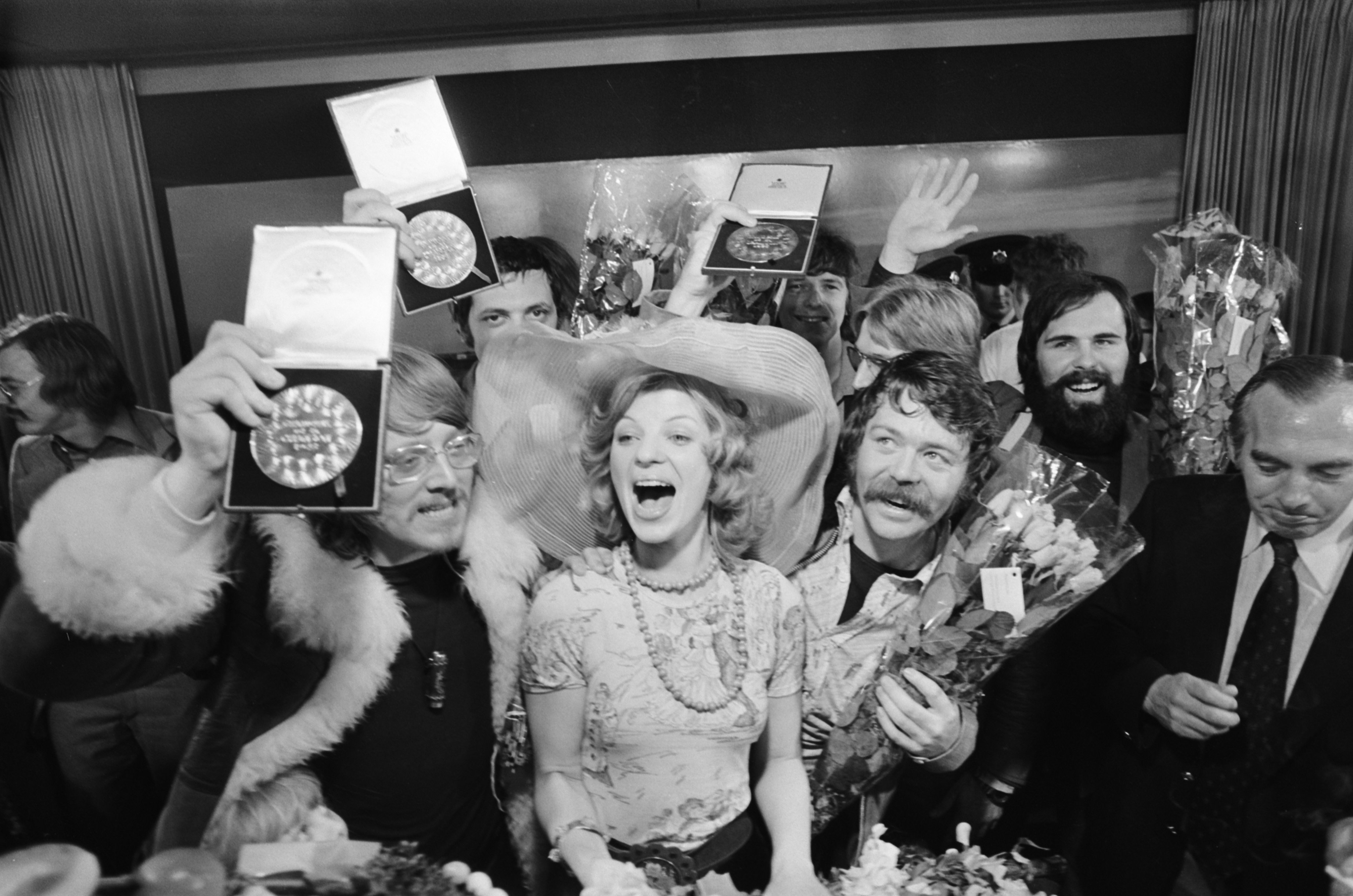
Teach-In, winners of the 1975 contest for the Netherlands.

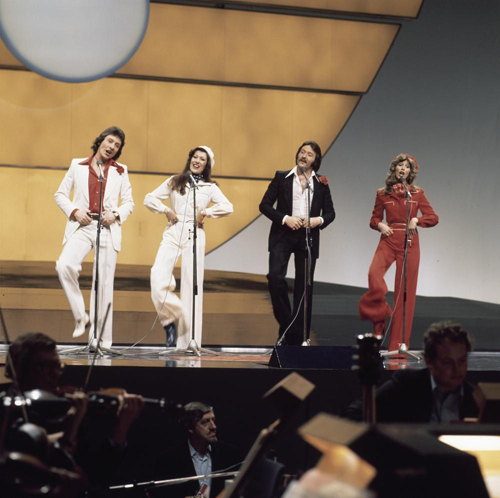
Brotherhood of Man, winners of the 1976 contest for the United Kingdom

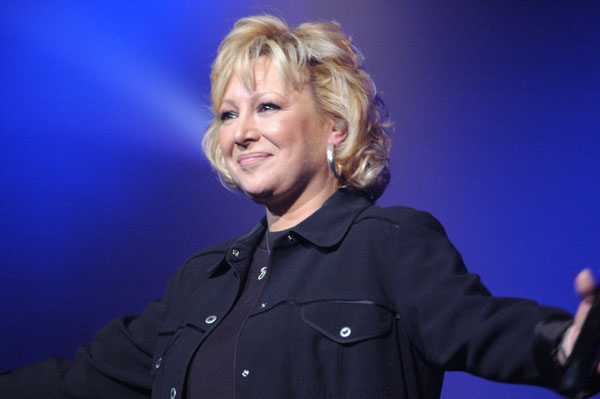
Marie Myriam, winner of the 1977 contest for France.

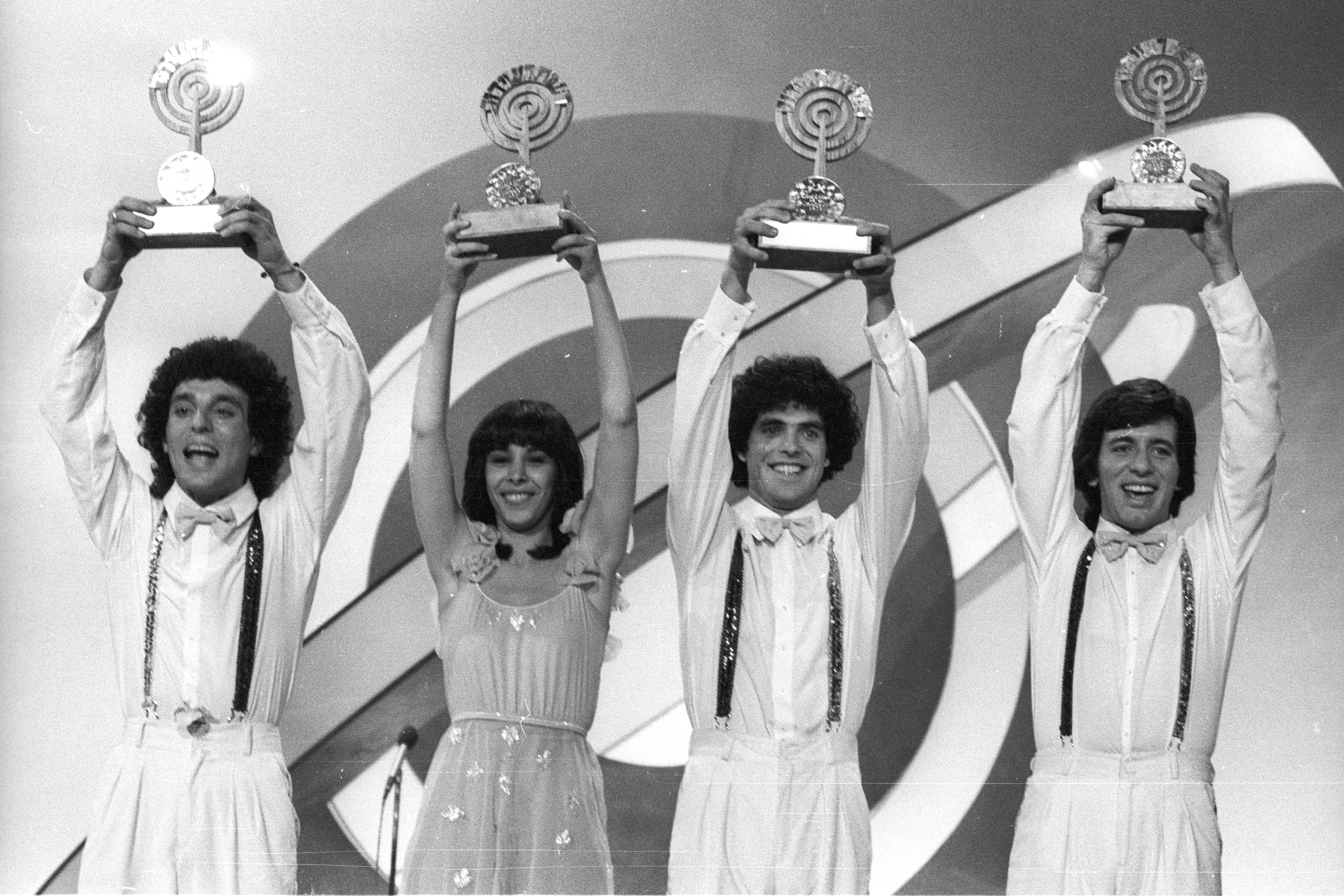
Milk and Honey winners of the 1979 contest for Israel.

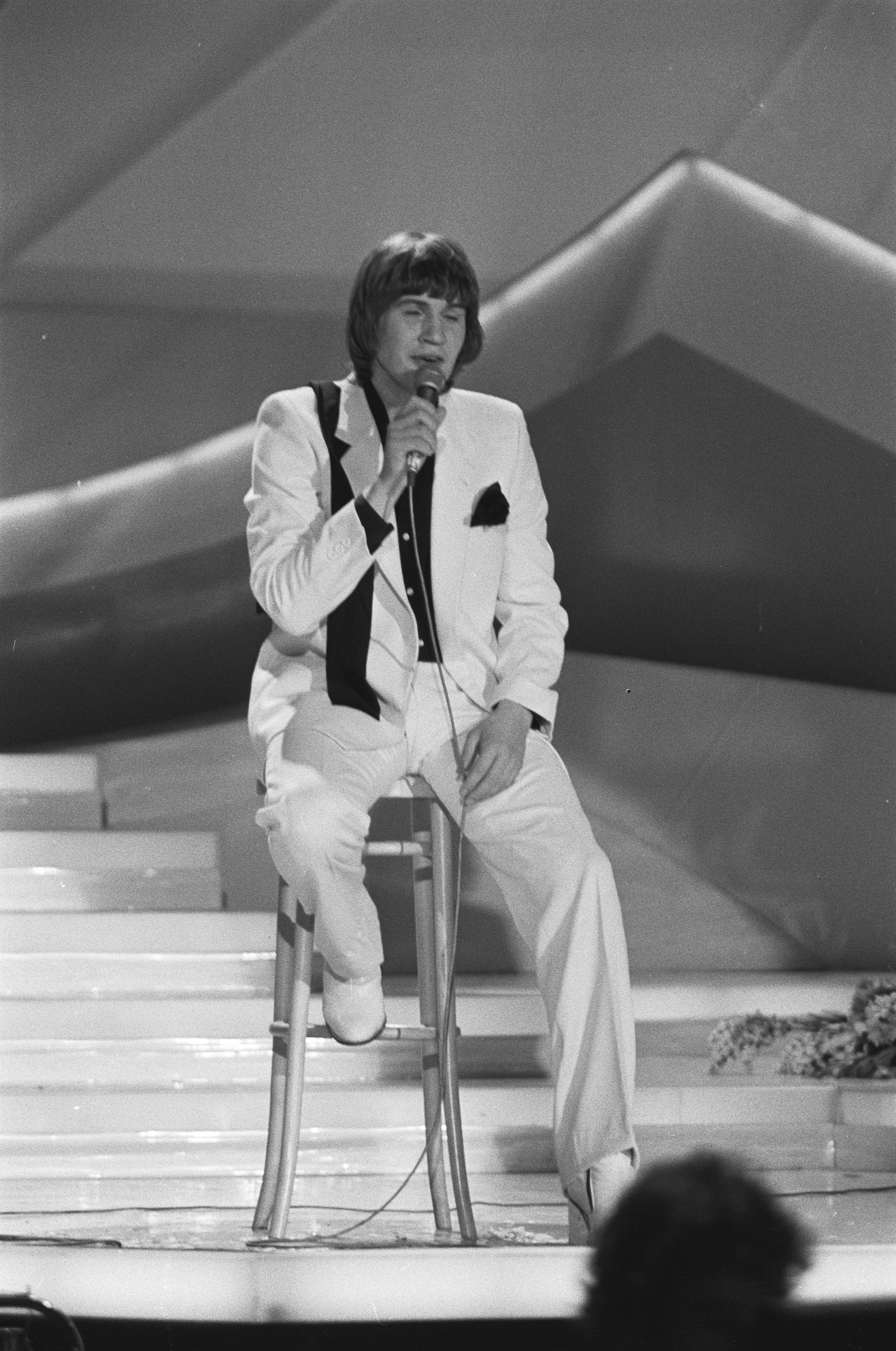
Johnny Logan, winner of the 1980 and 1987 contests for Ireland.

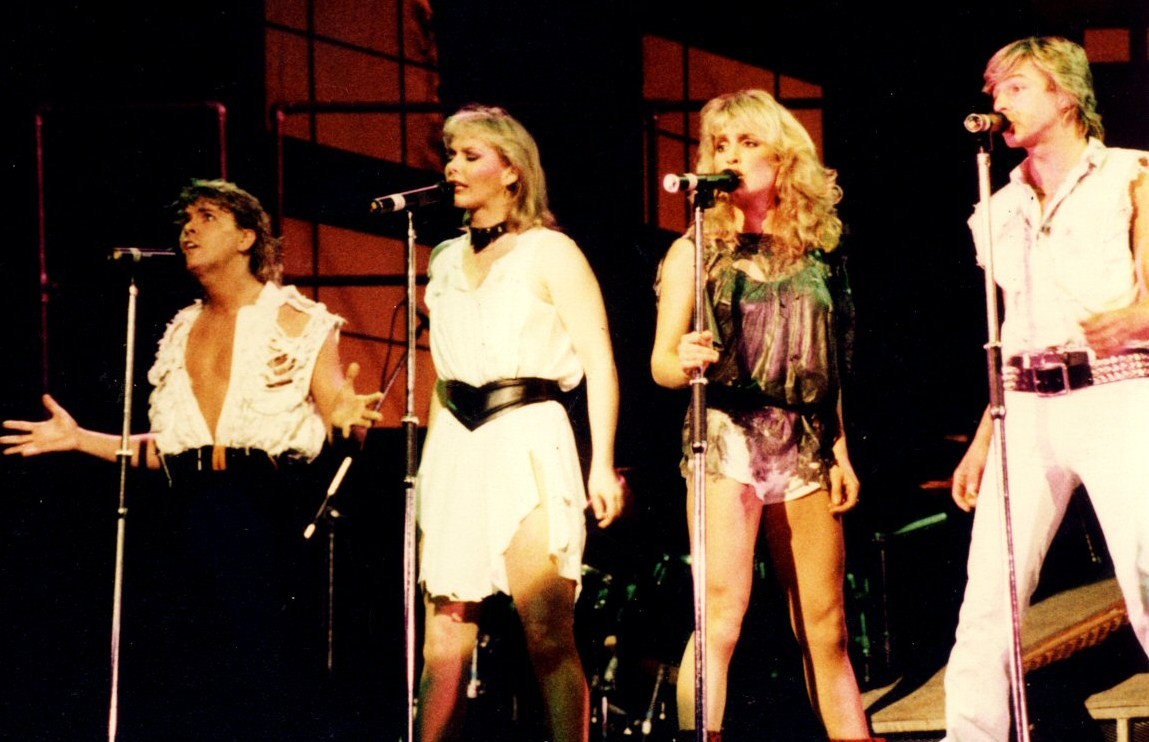
Bucks Fizz, winner of the 1981 contest for the United Kingdom.

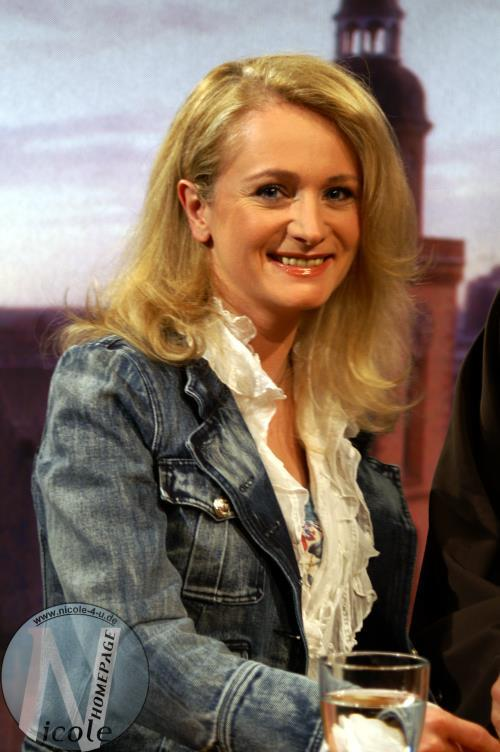
Nicole Hohloch, winner of the 1982 contest for Germany.

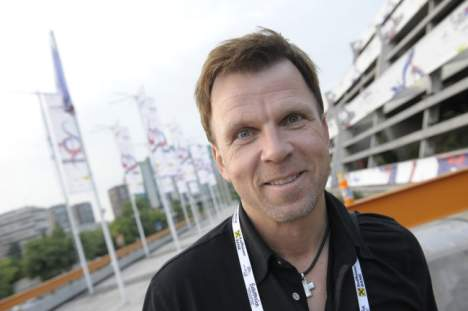
Richard Herrey from Herreys, winners of the 1984 contest for Sweden.

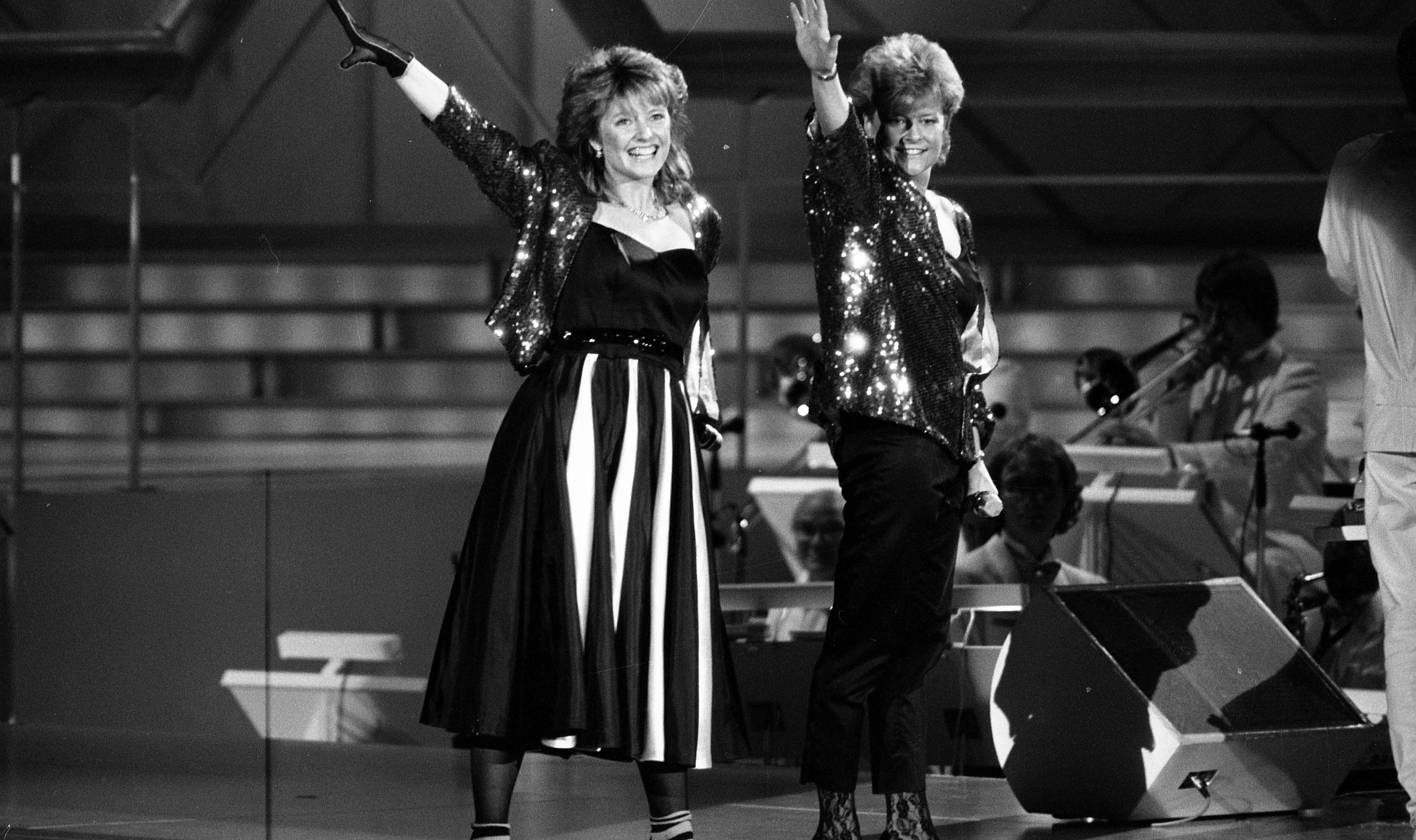
Bobbysocks!, winners of the 1985 contest for Norway.

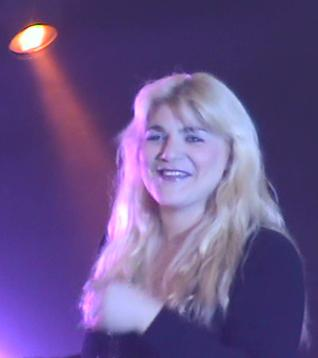
Sandra Kim, winner of the 1986 contest for Belgium.

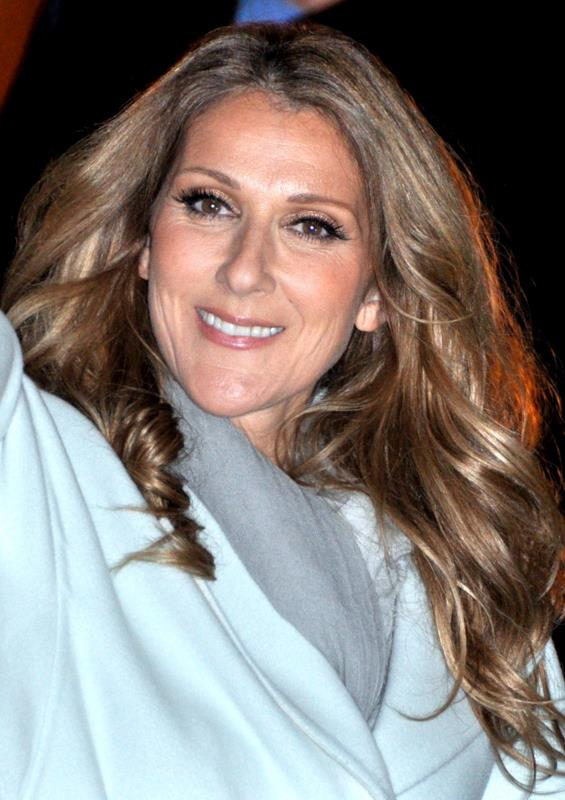
Céline Dion, winner of the 1988 contest for Switzerland.

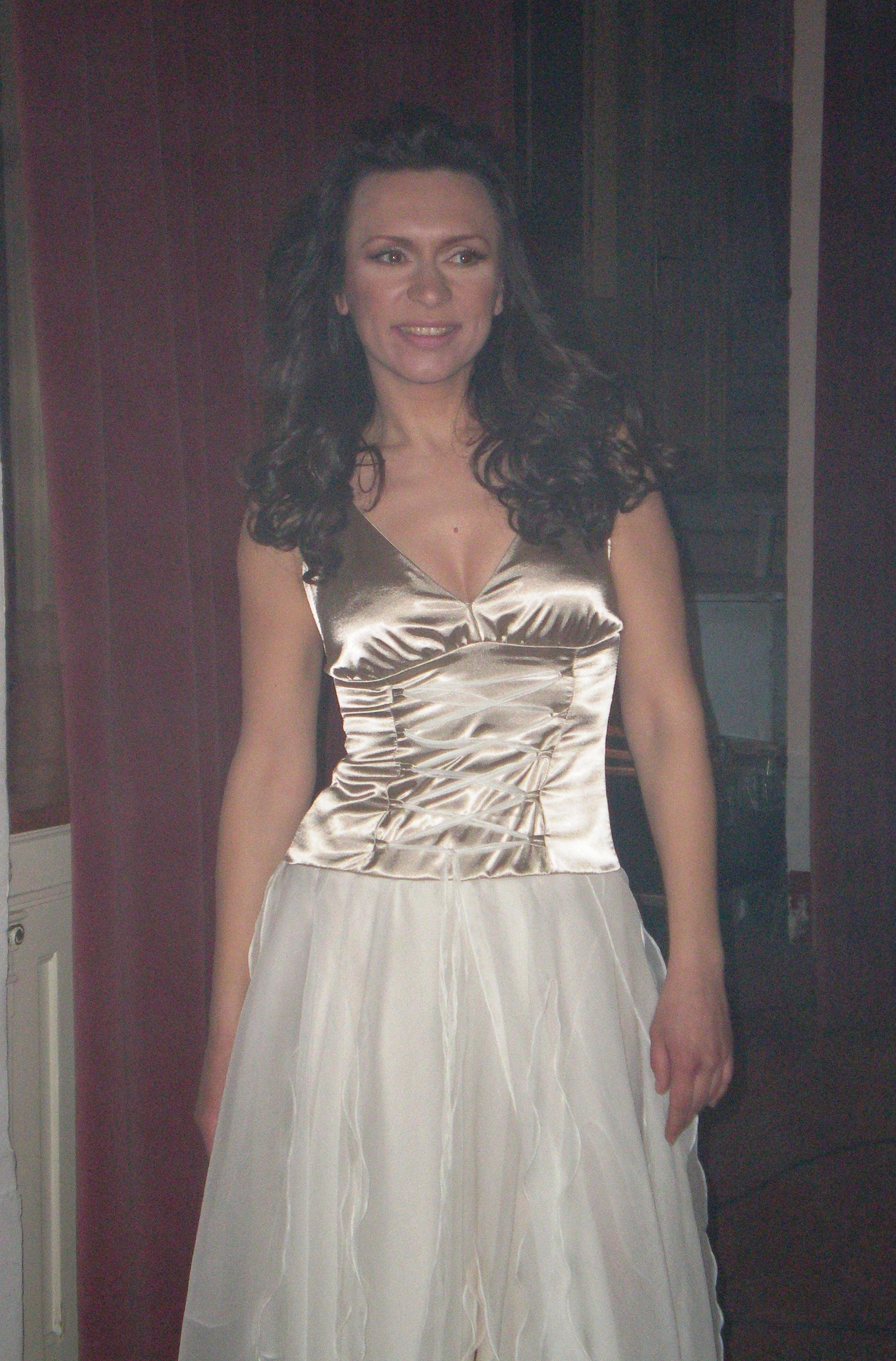
Emilija Kokić, lead vocalist for the winning band Riva in 1989 for Yugoslavia.

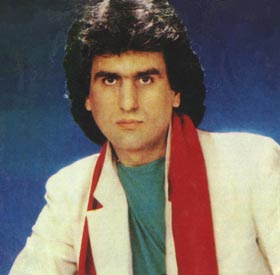
Toto Cutugno, winner of the 1990 contest for Italy.

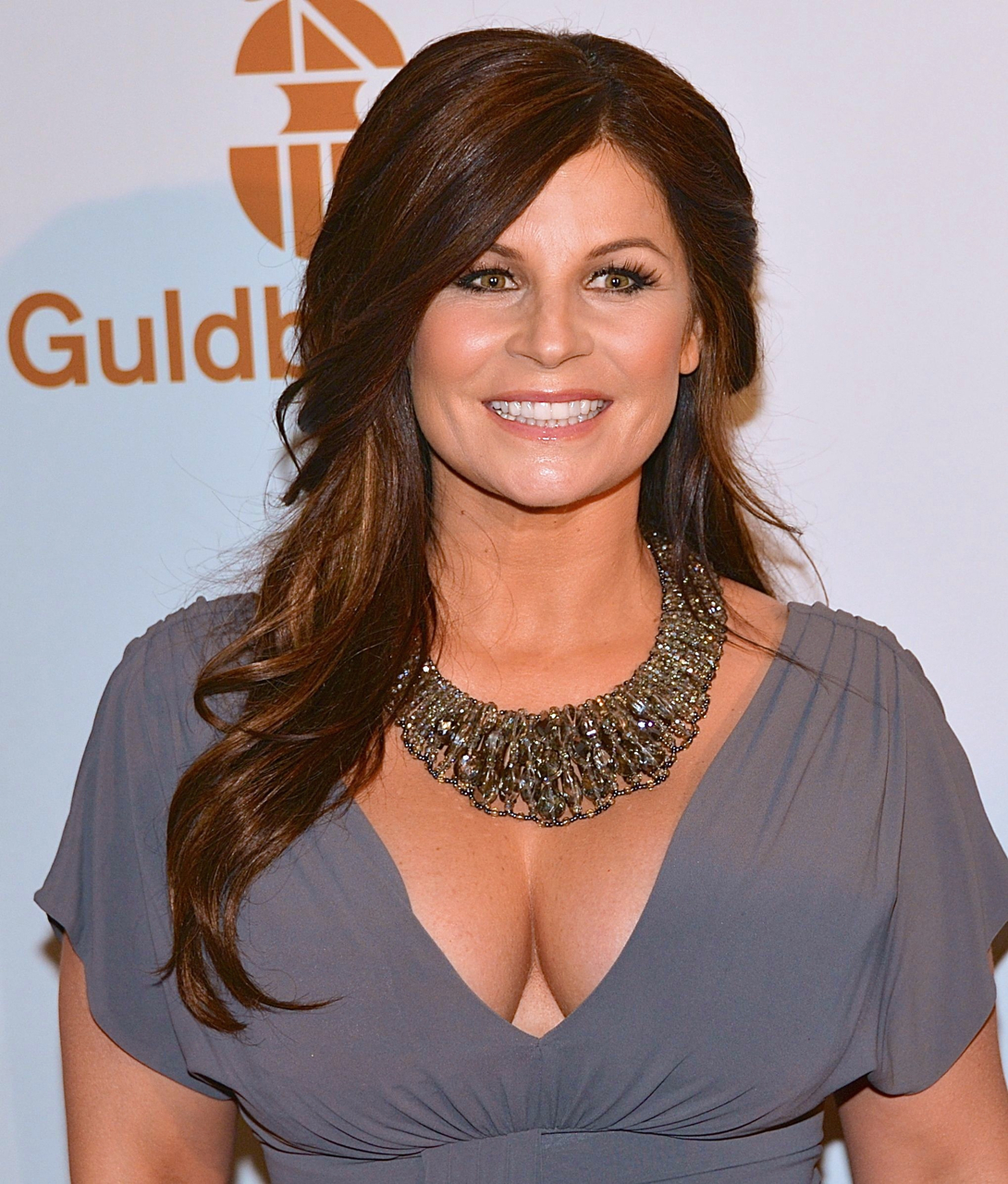
Carola Häggkvist, winner of the 1991 contest for Sweden.

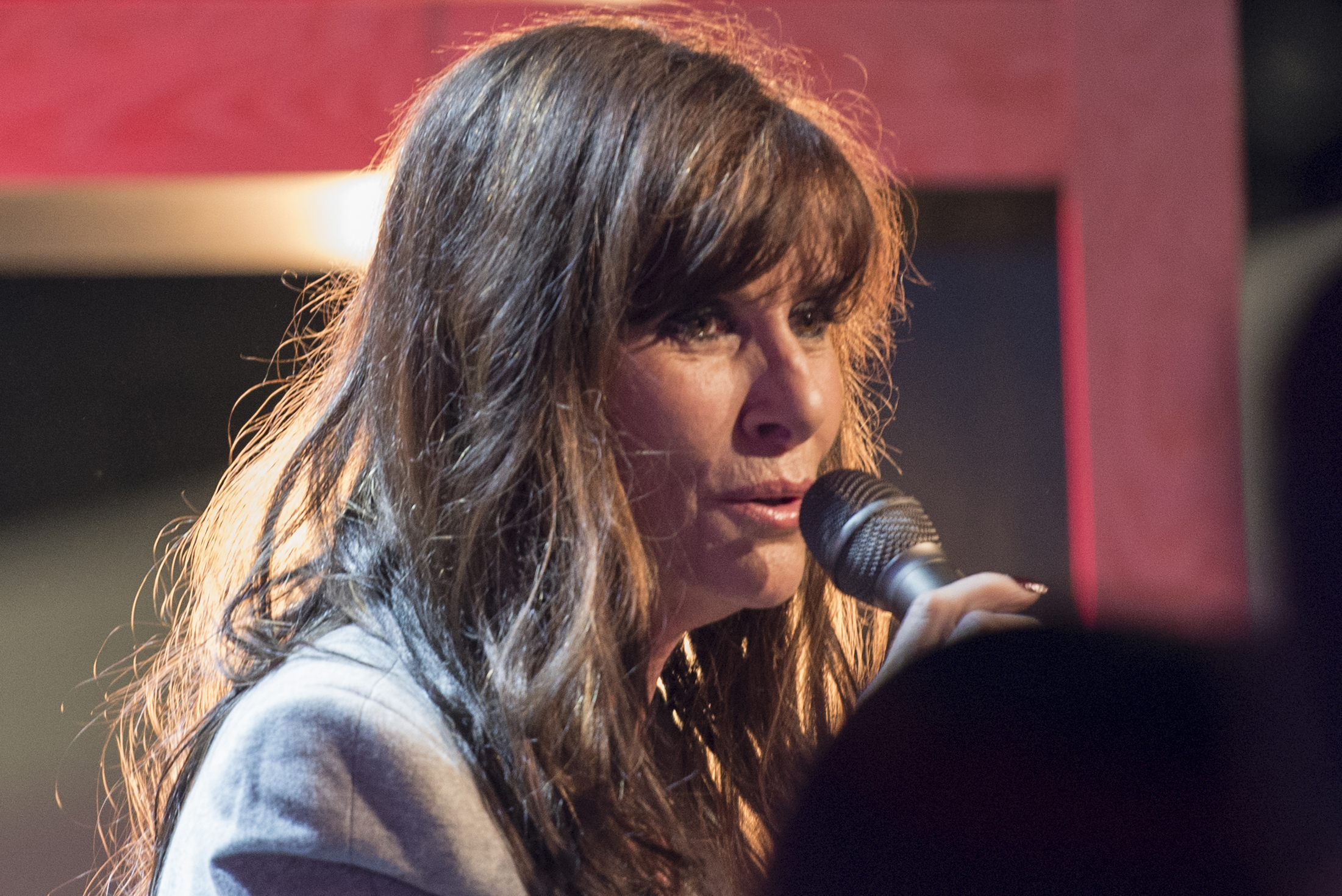
Linda Martin, winner of the 1992 contest for Ireland.

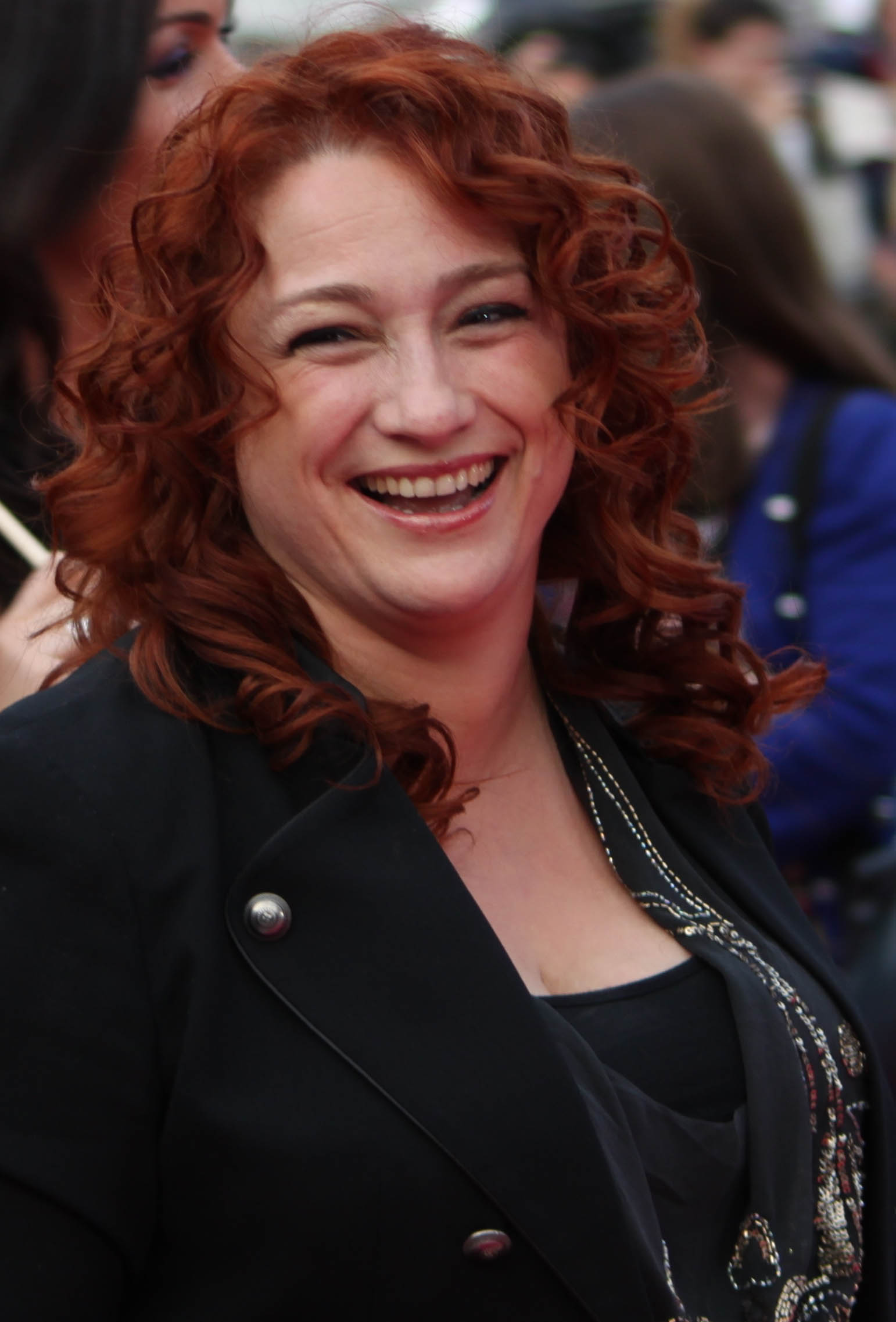
Niamh Kavanagh, winner of the 1993 contest for Ireland.

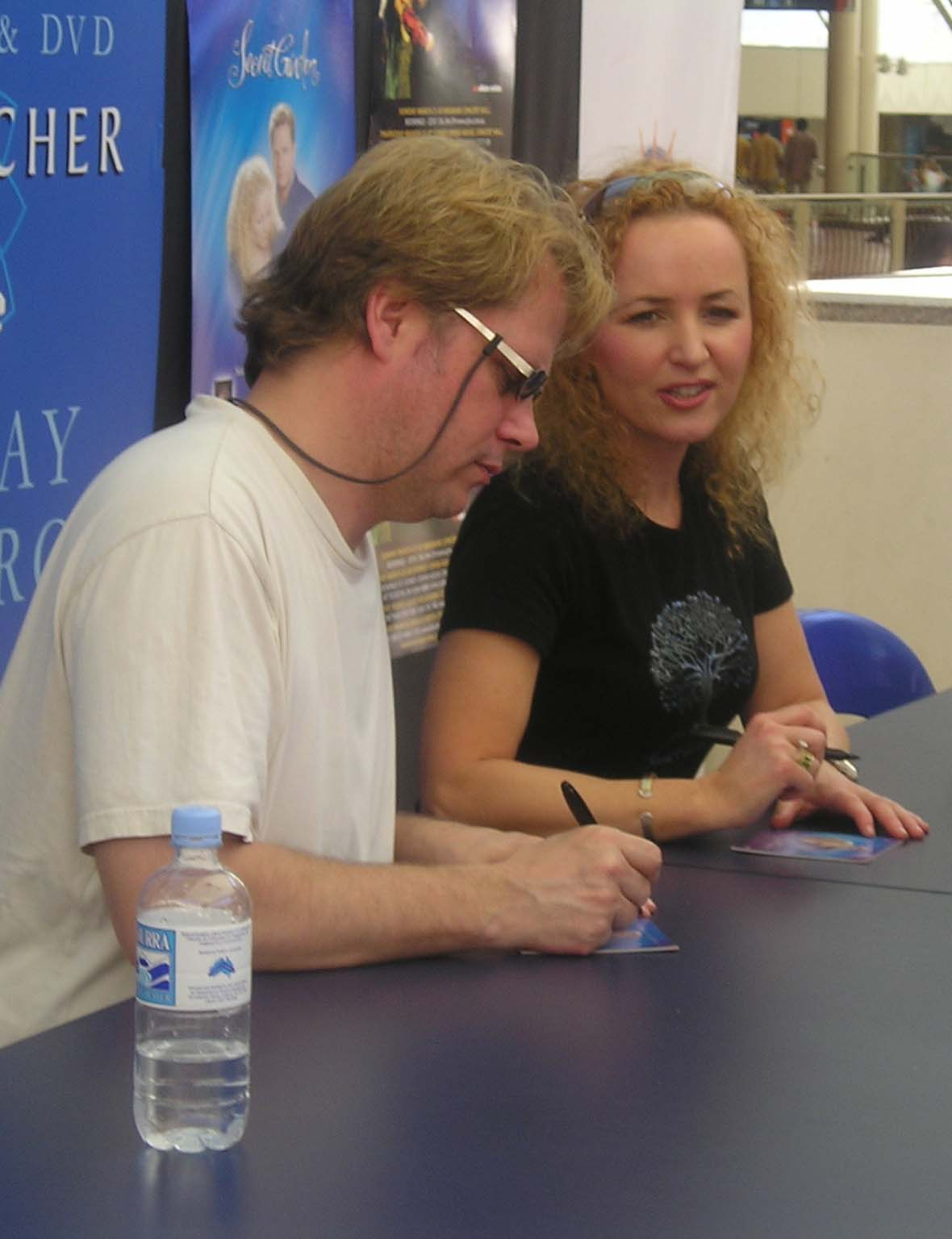
Secret Garden, winner of the 1995 contest for Norway.

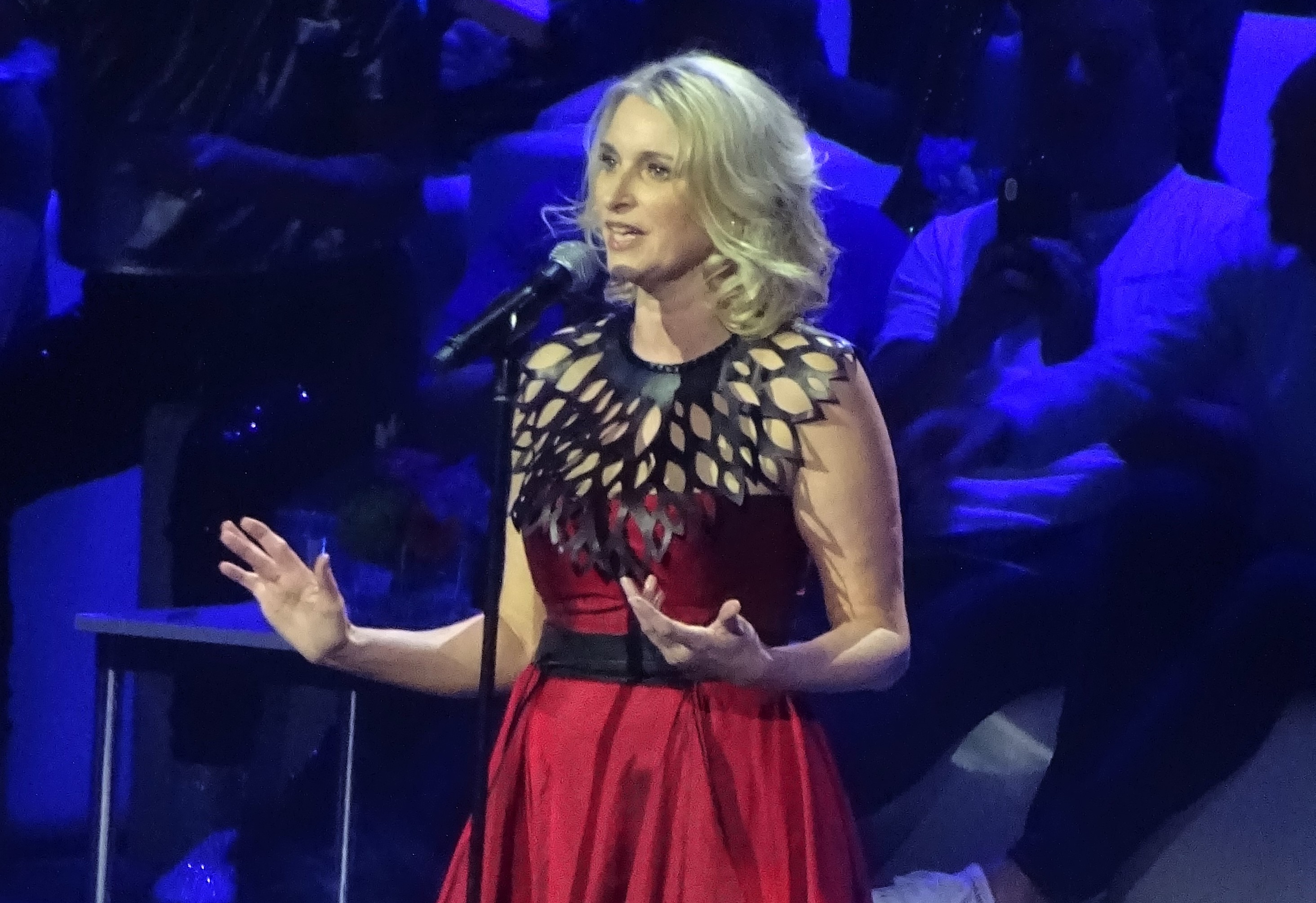
Eimear Quinn, winner of the 1996 contest for Ireland.

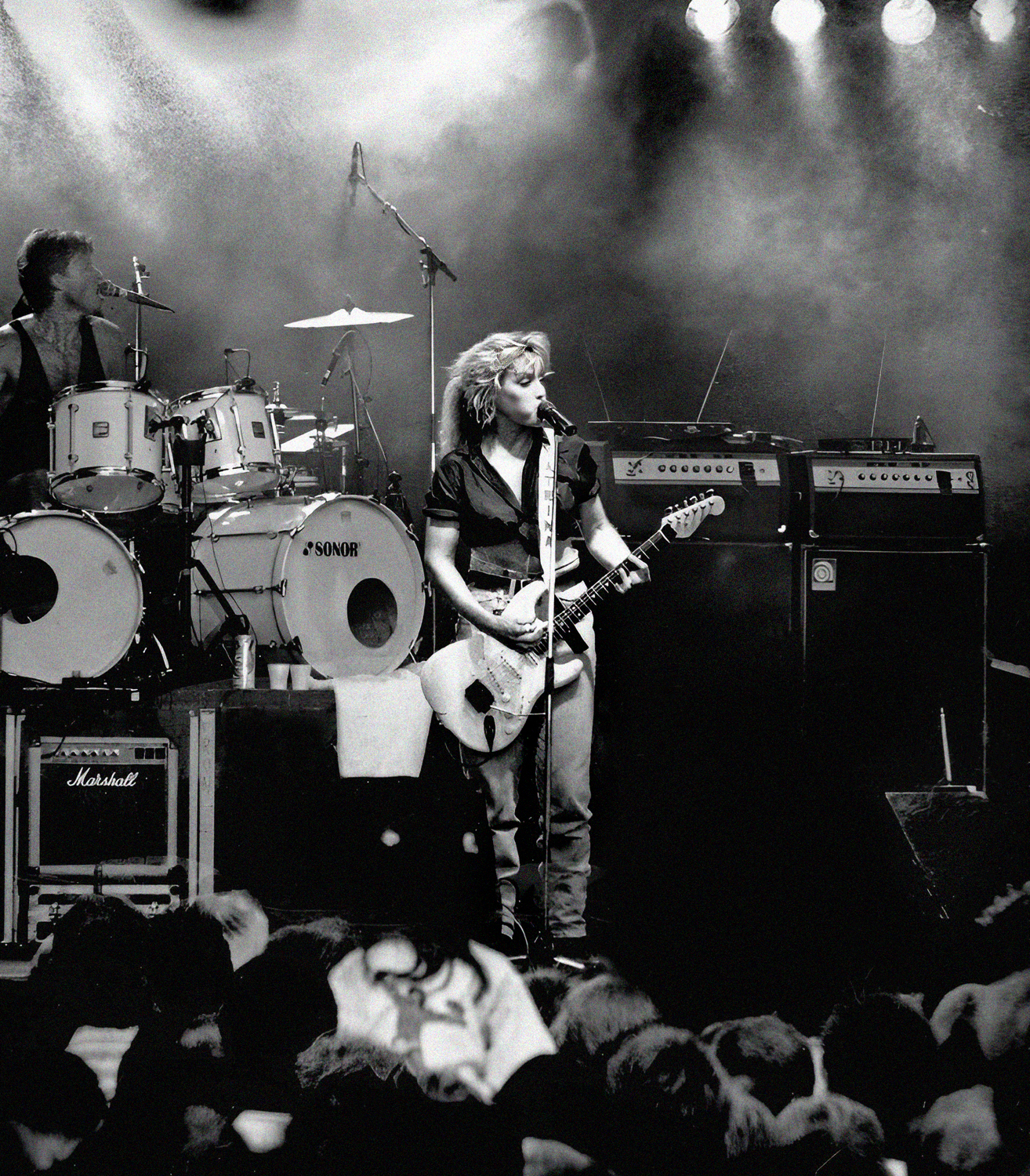
Katrina and the Waves, winners of the 1997 contest for the United Kingdom.

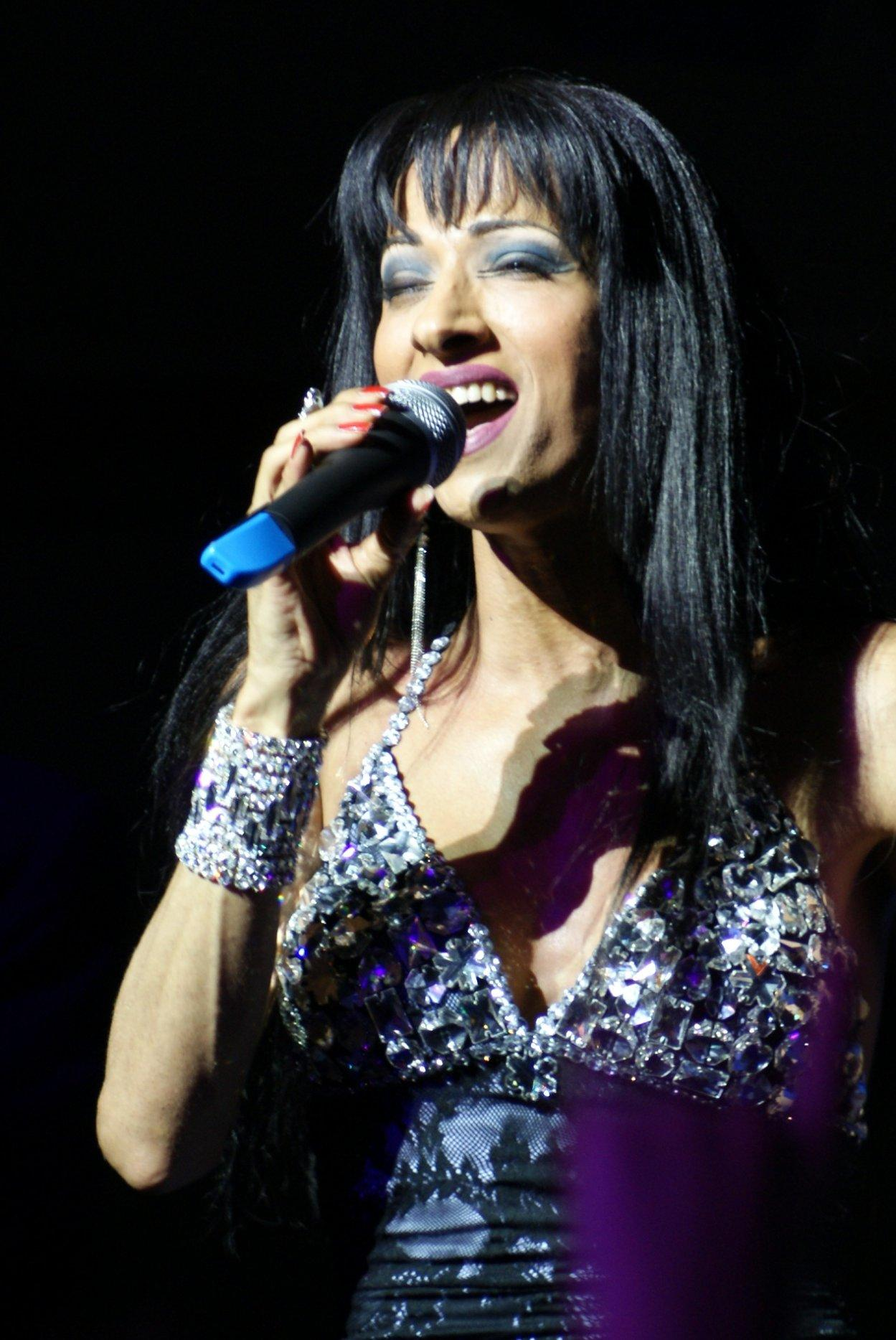
Dana International, winner of the 1998 contest for Israel.

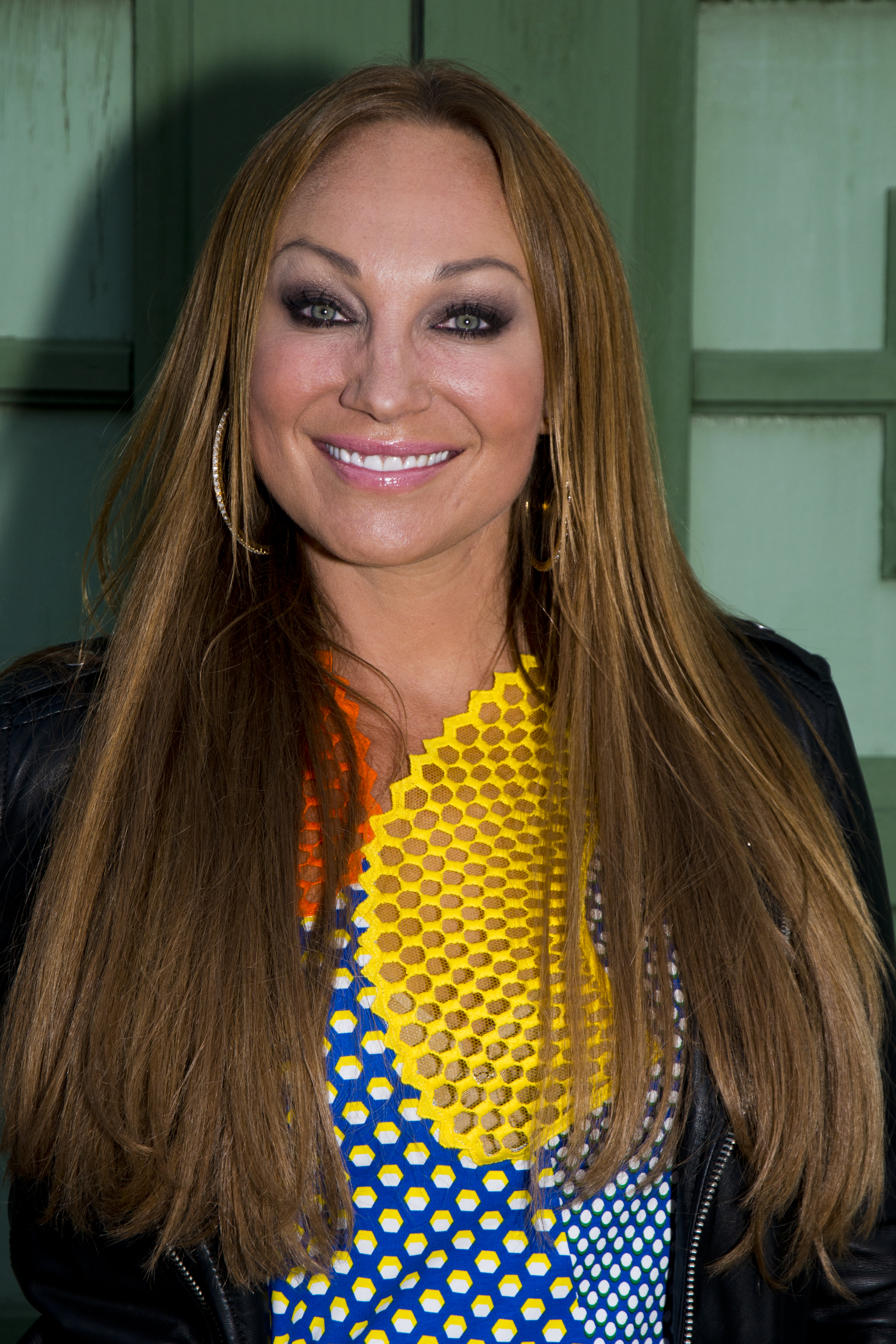
Charlotte Nilsson, winner of the 1999 contest for Sweden.

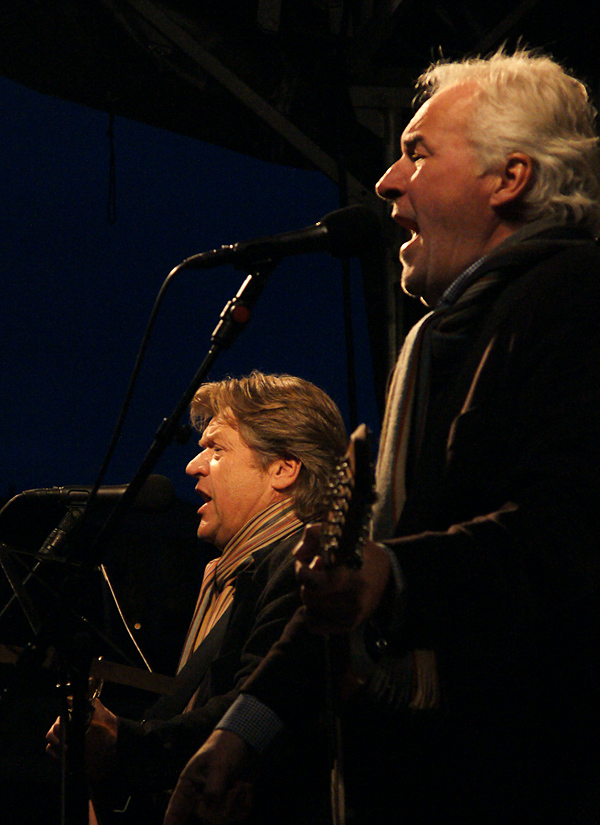
Olsen Brothers, winners of the 2000 contest for Denmark.

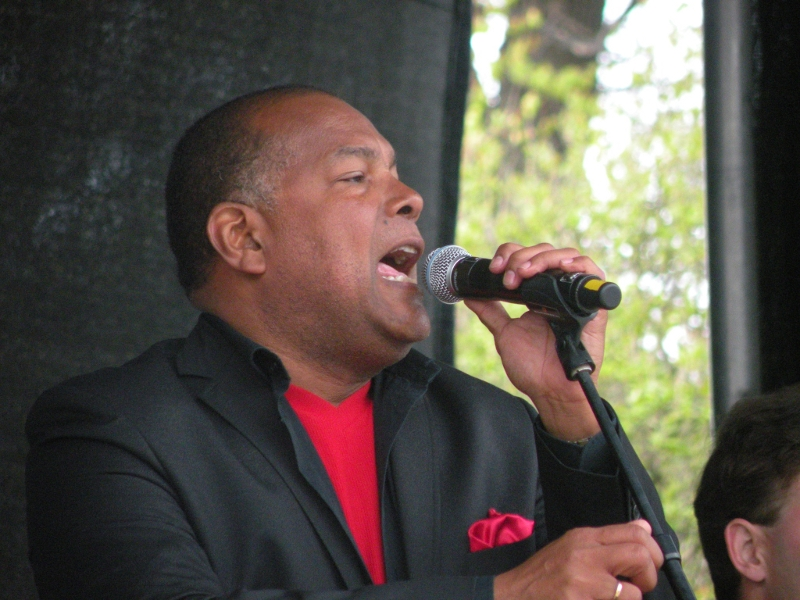
Dave Benton, winner (together with Tanel Padar and 2XL) of the 2001 contest for Estonia.

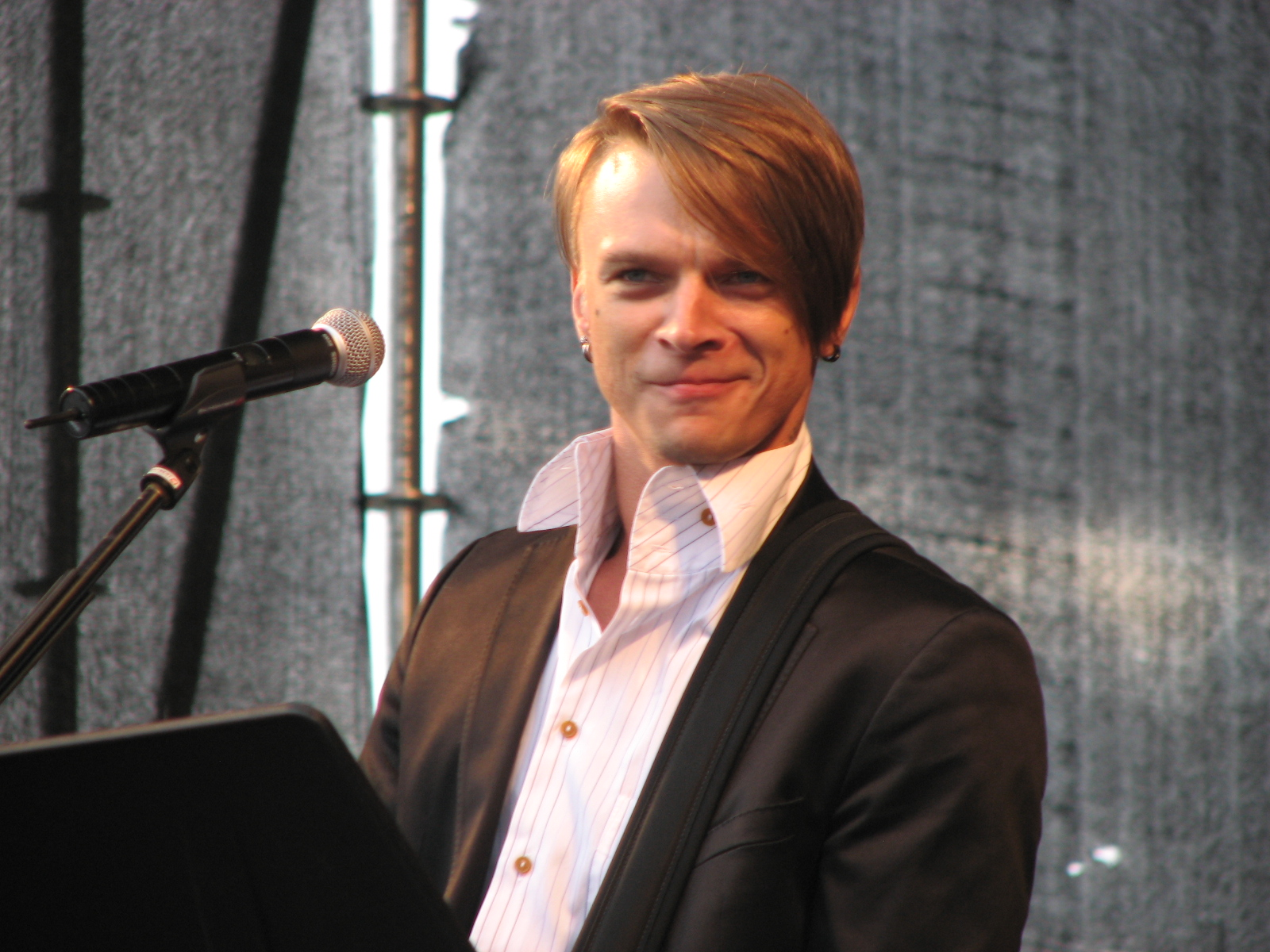
Tanel Padar, winner (together with Dave Benton and 2XL) of the 2001 contest for Estonia.

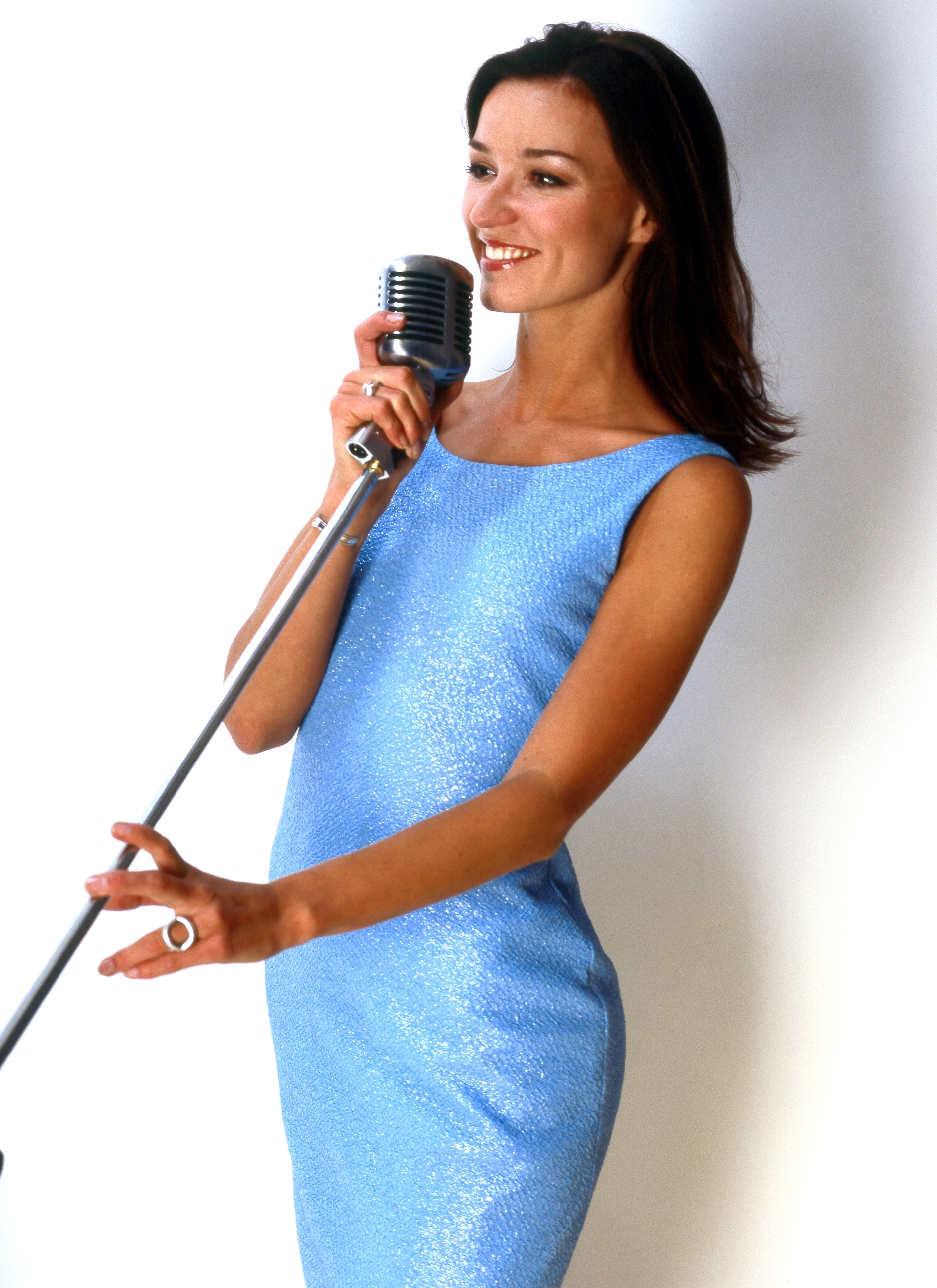
Marie N, winner of the 2002 contest for Latvia.

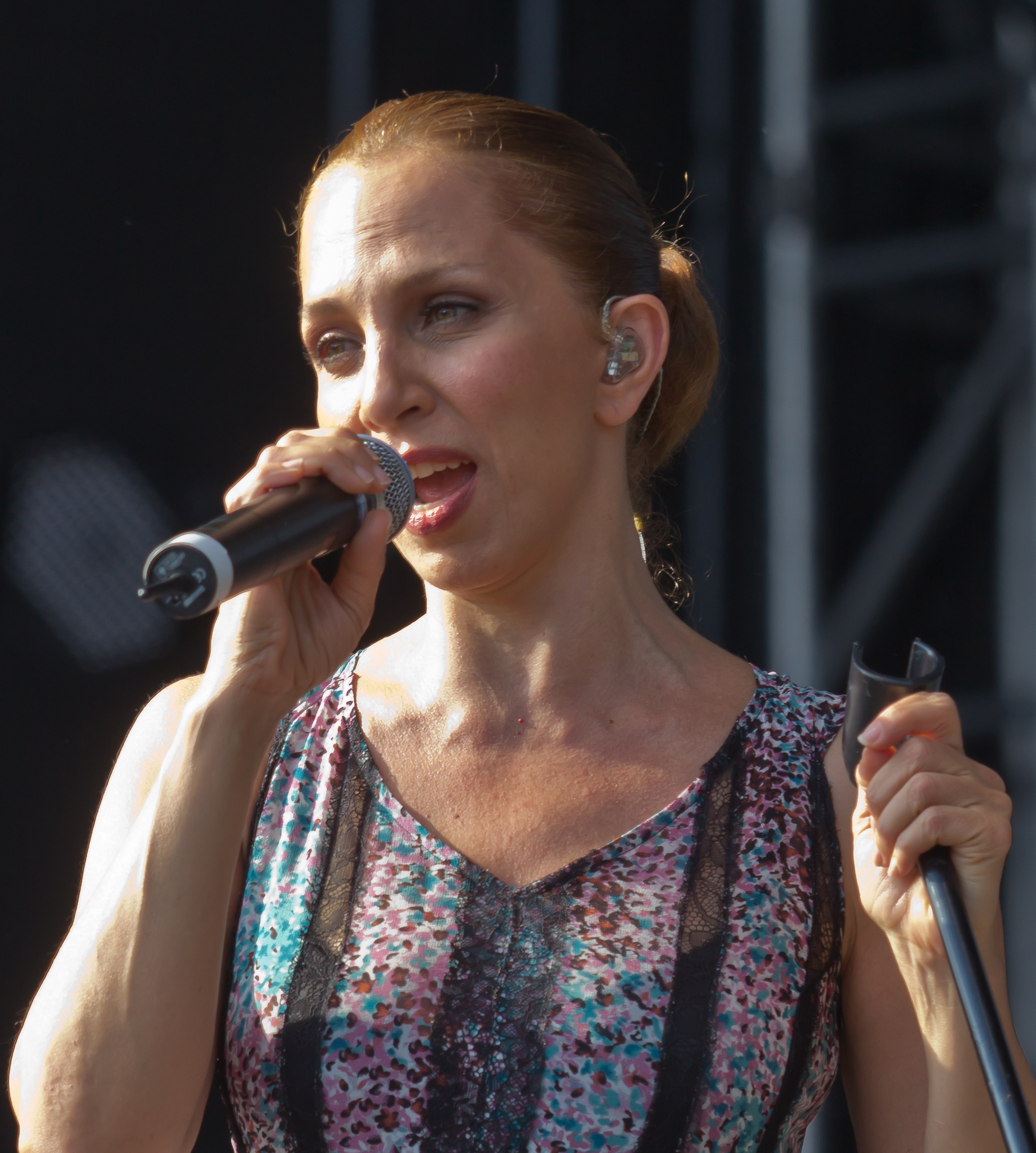
Sertab Erener, winner of the 2003 contest for Turkey.

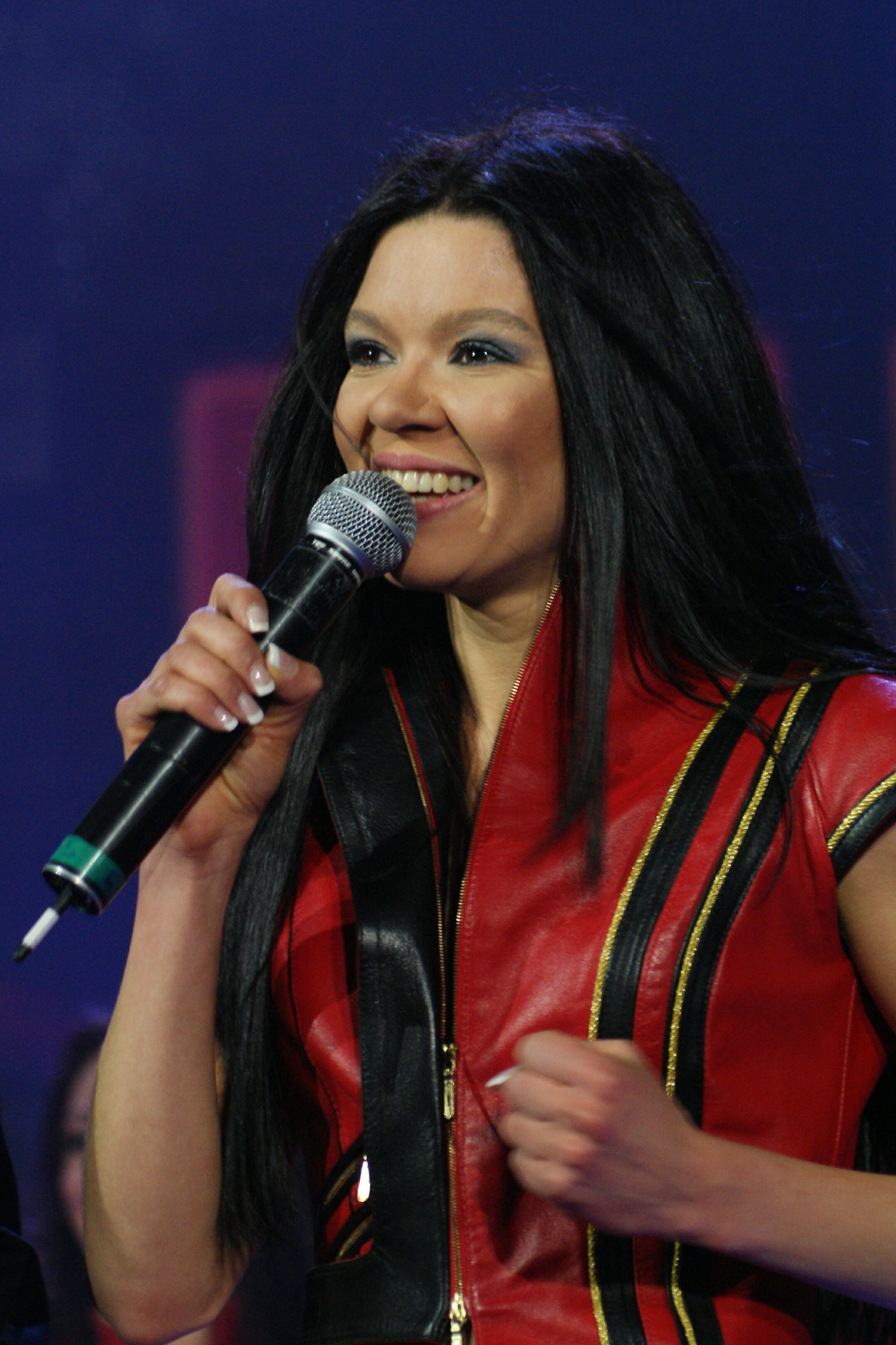
Ruslana, winner of the 2004 contest for Ukraine.

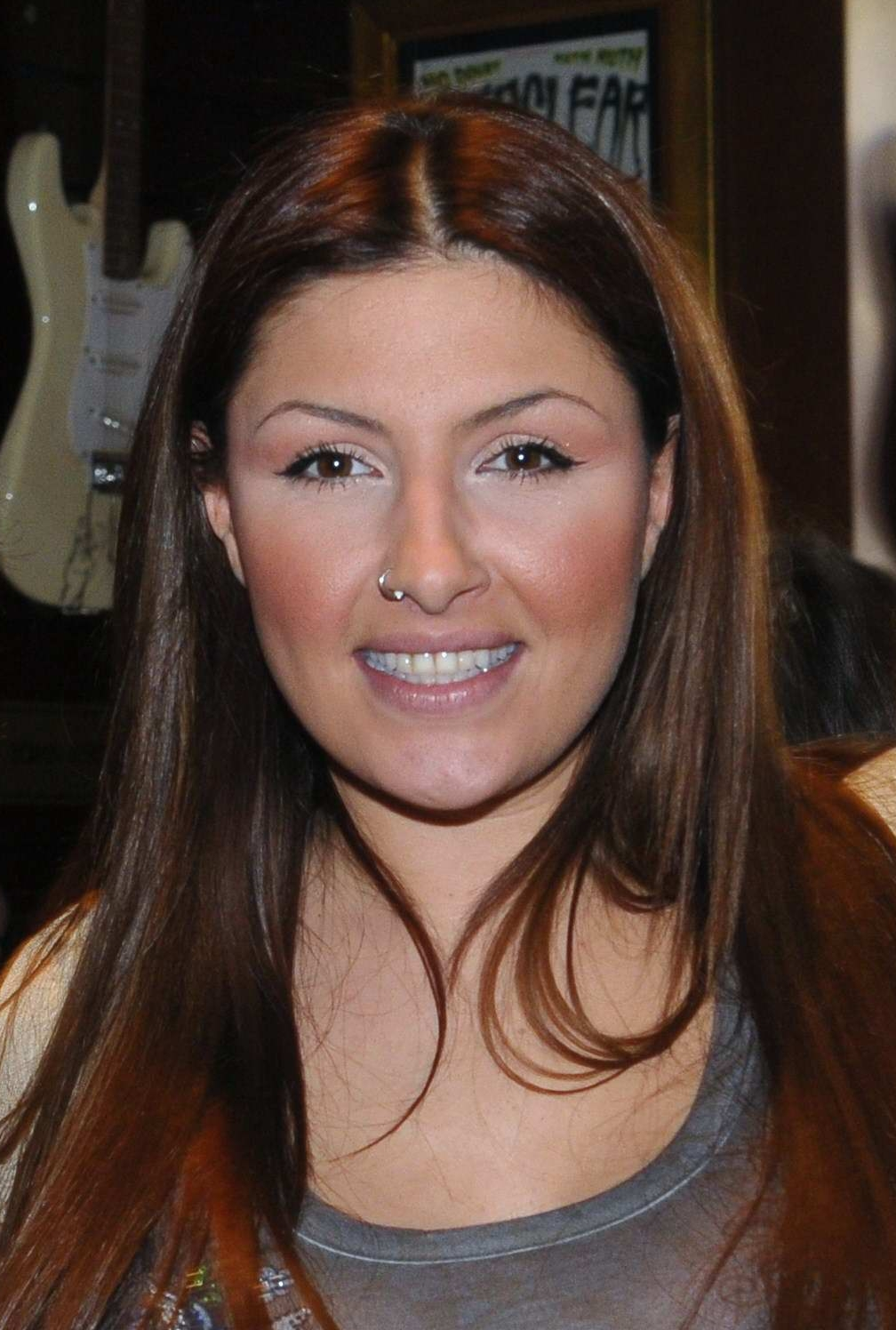
Helena Paparizou, winner of the 2005 contest for Greece.

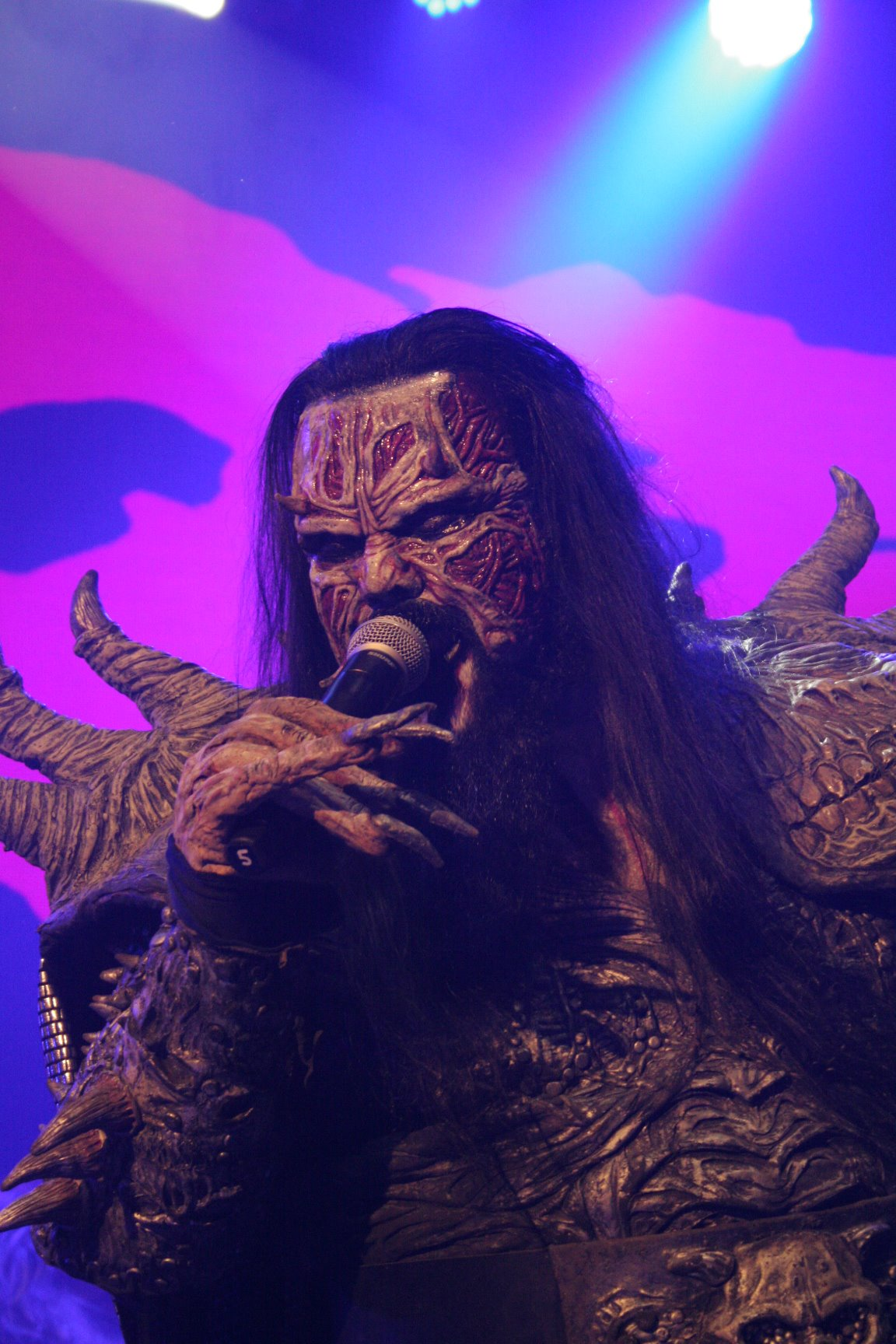
Lordi, winner of the 2006 contest for Finland.

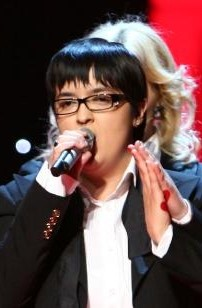
Marija Šerifović, winner of the 2007 contest for Serbia.

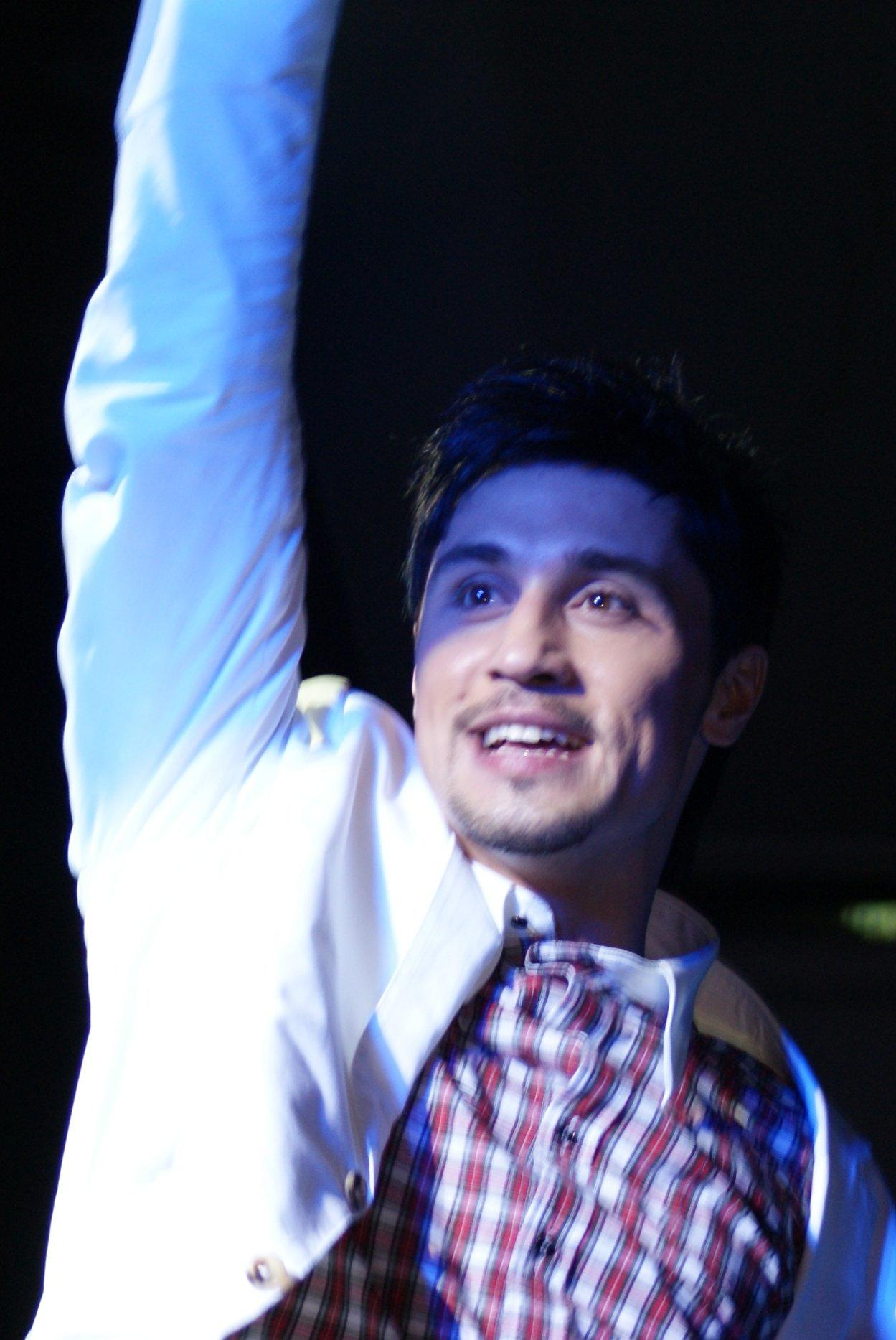
Dima Bilan, winner of the 2008 contest for Russia.

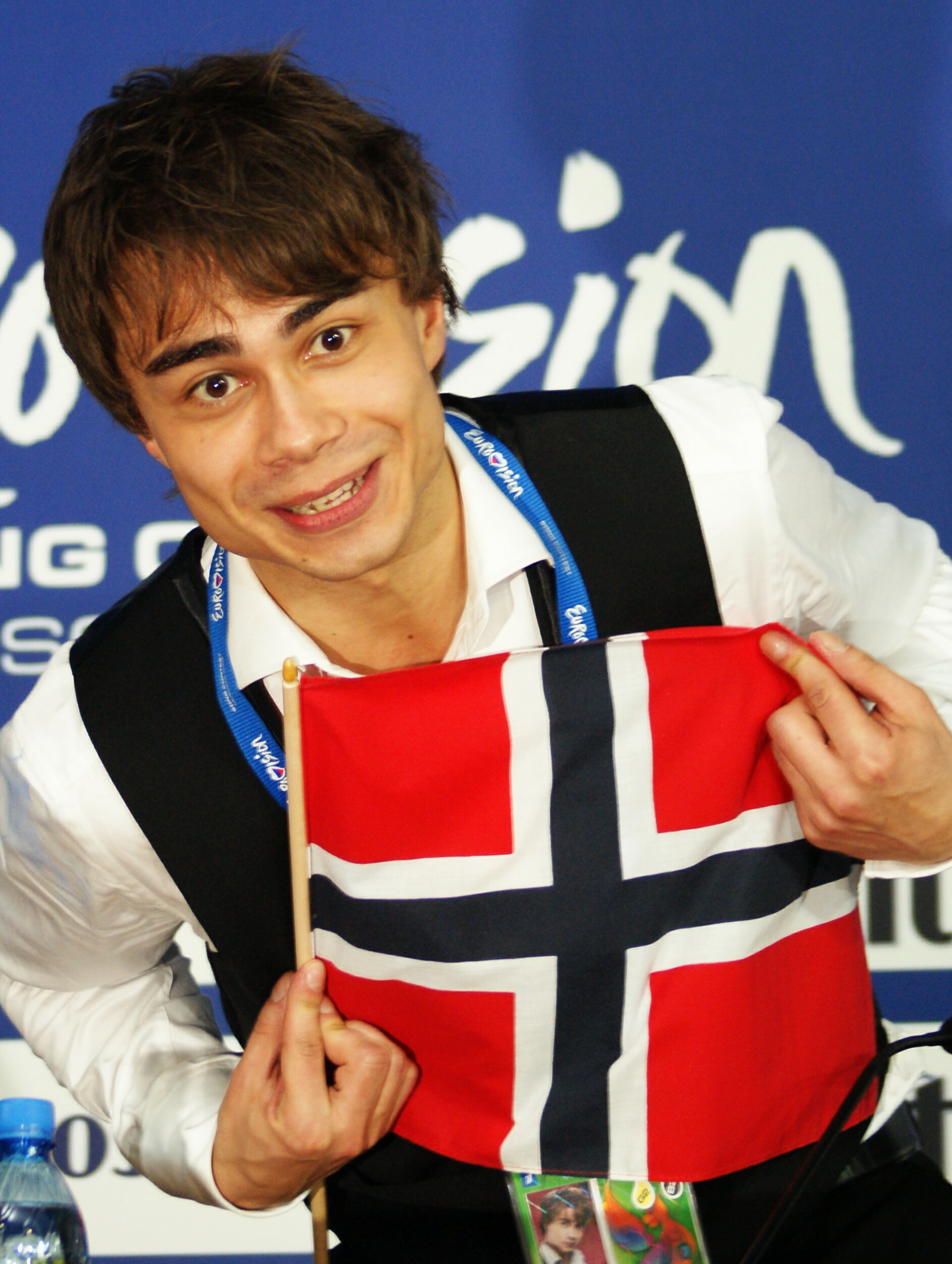
Alexander Rybak, winner of the 2009 contest for Norway.

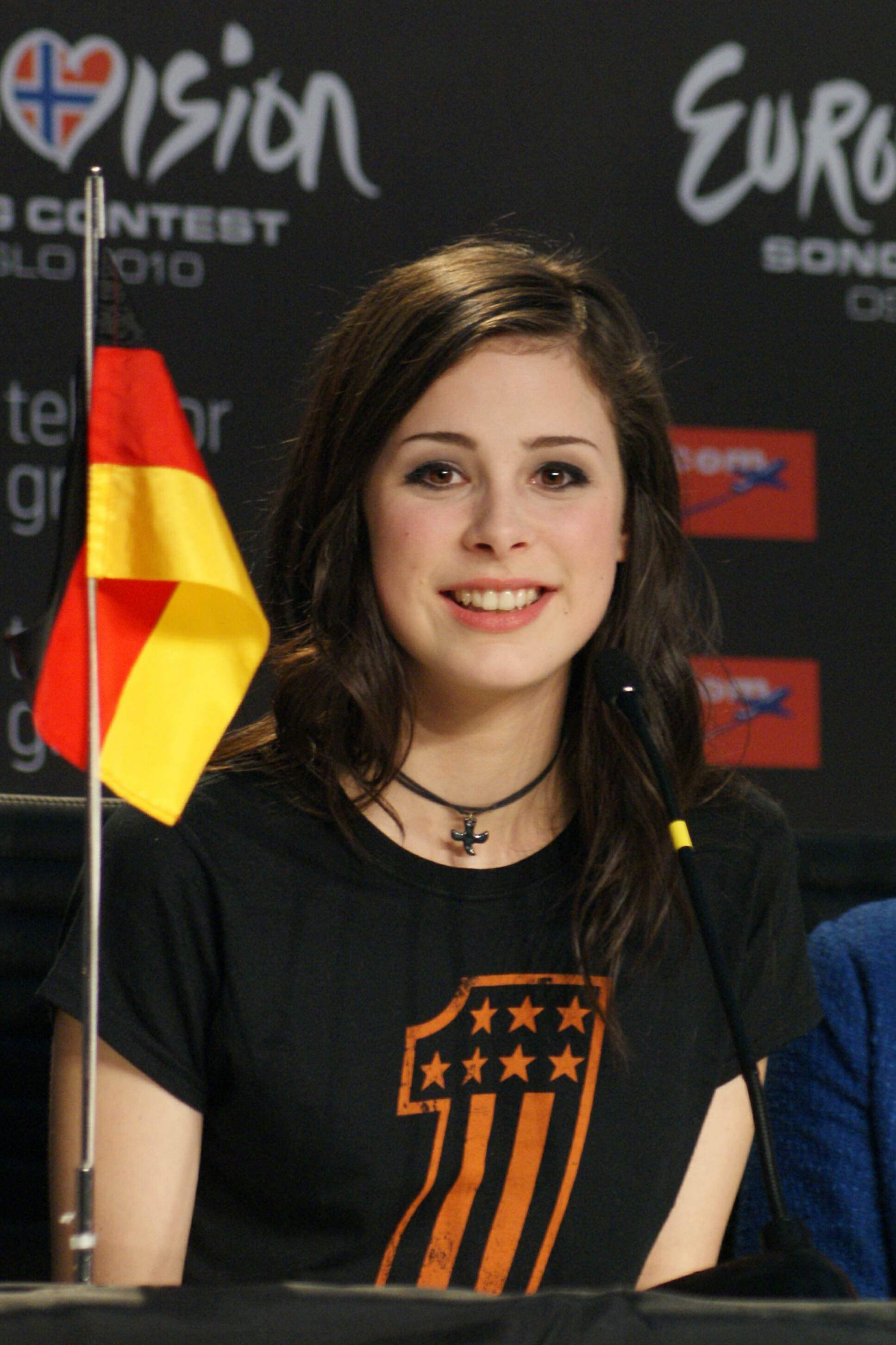
Lena, winner of the 2010 contest for Germany.

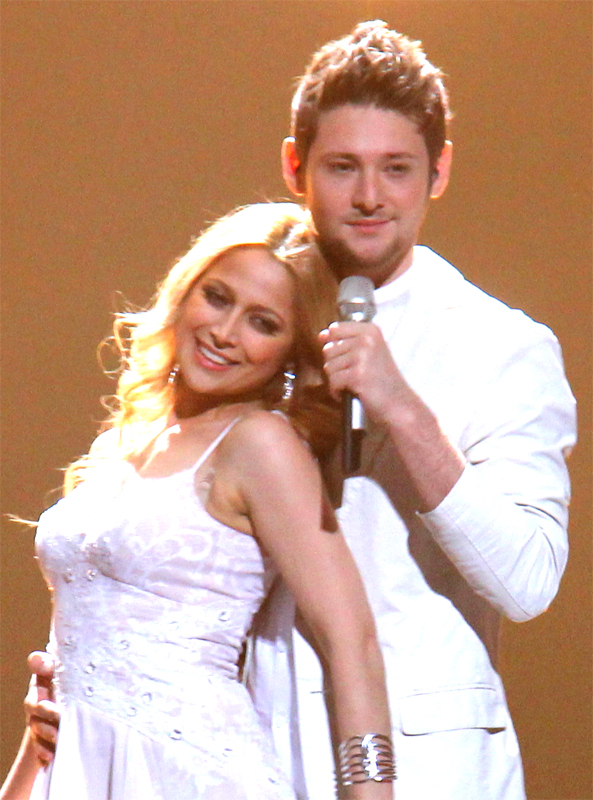
Ell and Nikki, winners of the 2011 contest for Azerbaijan.

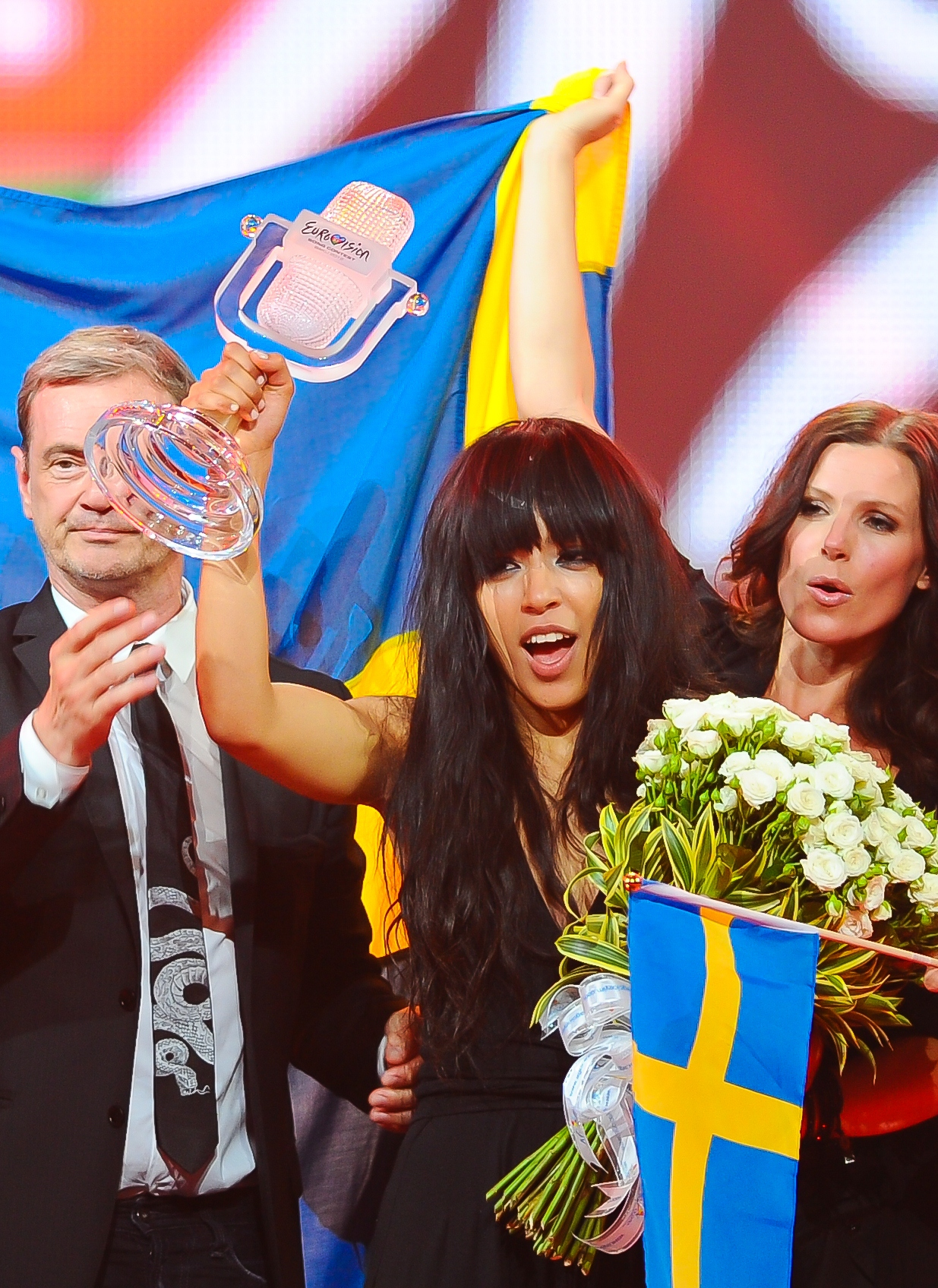
Loreen, winner of the 2012 and 2023 contests for Sweden.

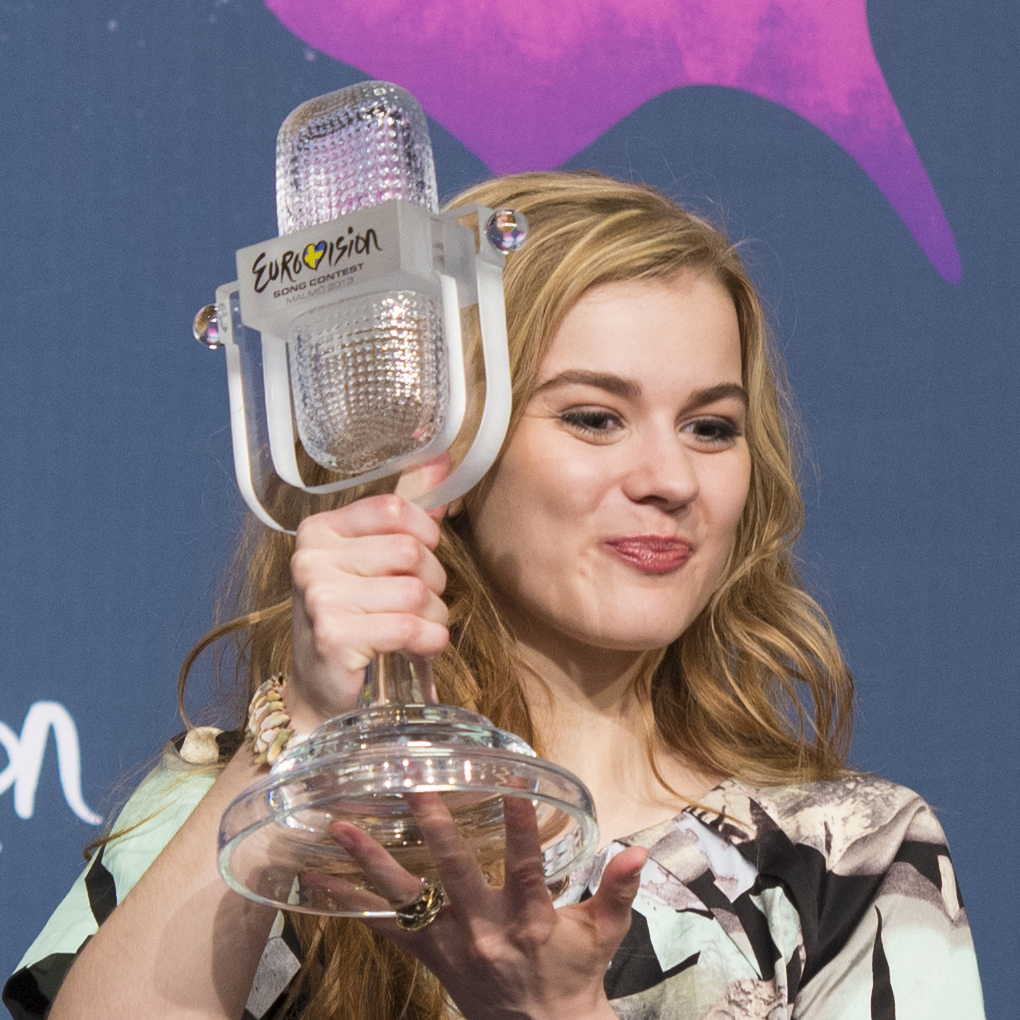
Emmelie de Forest, winner of the 2013 contest for Denmark.

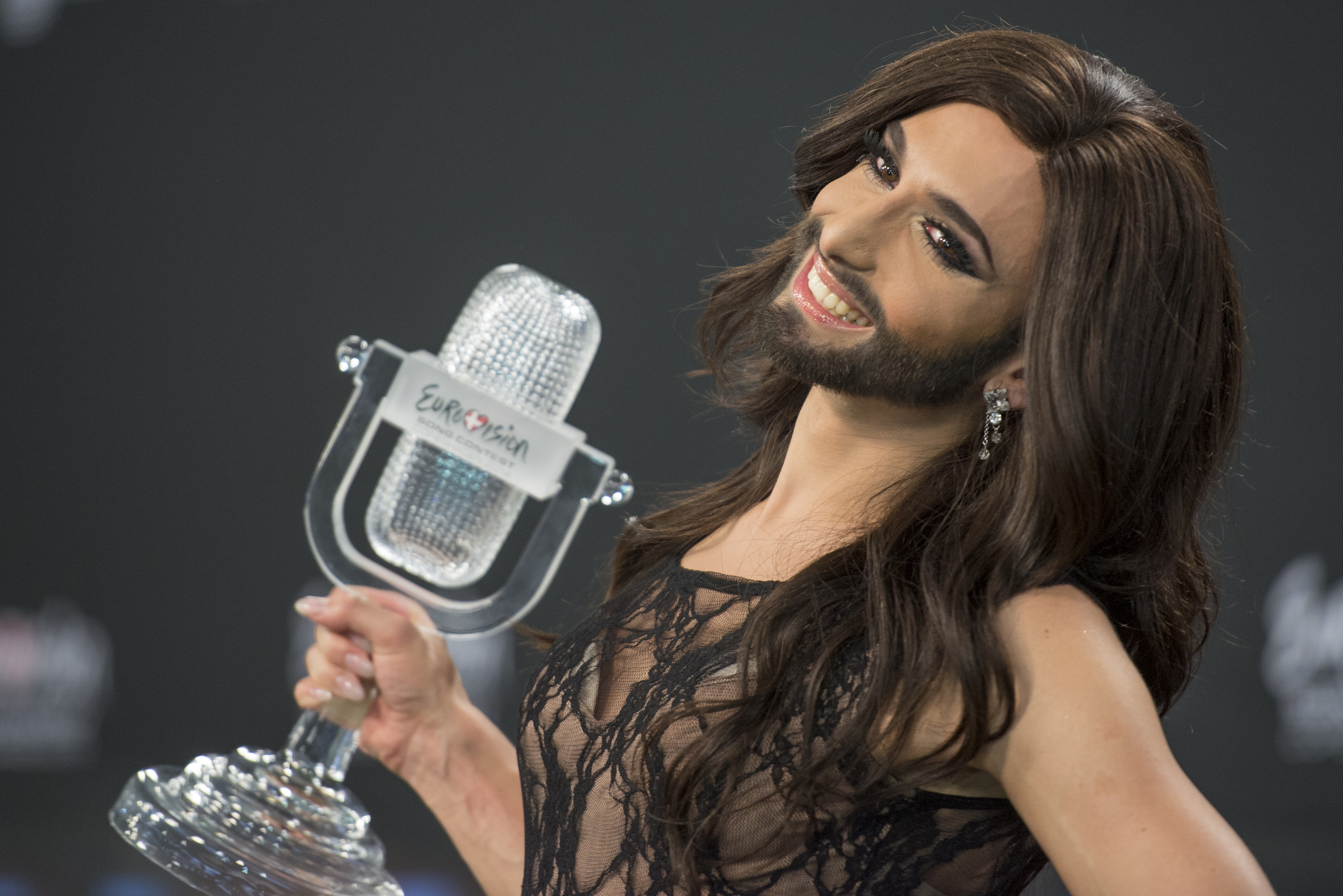
Conchita Wurst, winner of the 2014 contest for Austria.

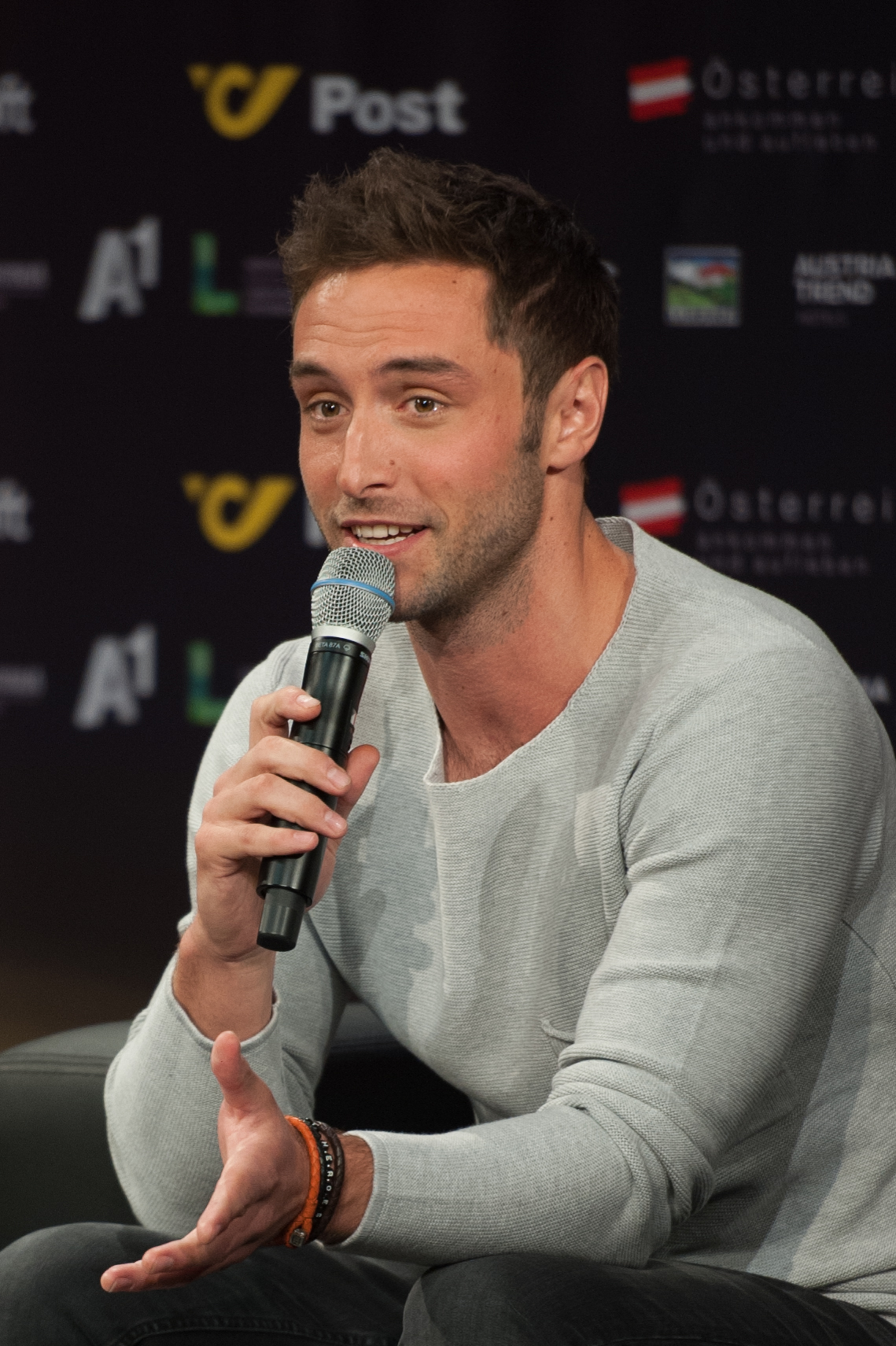
Måns Zelmerlöw, winner of the 2015 contest for Sweden.

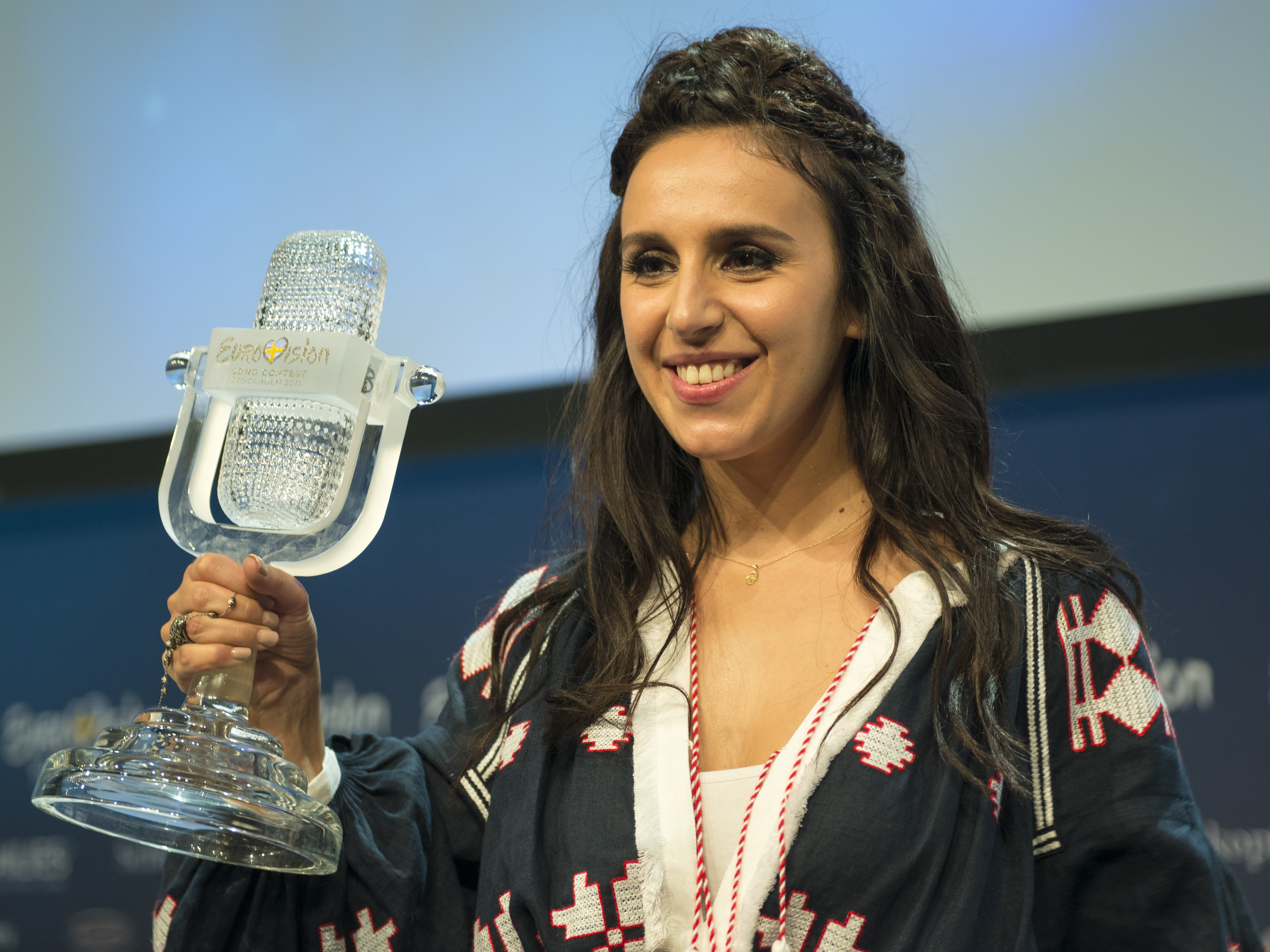
Jamala, winner of the 2016 contest for Ukraine.

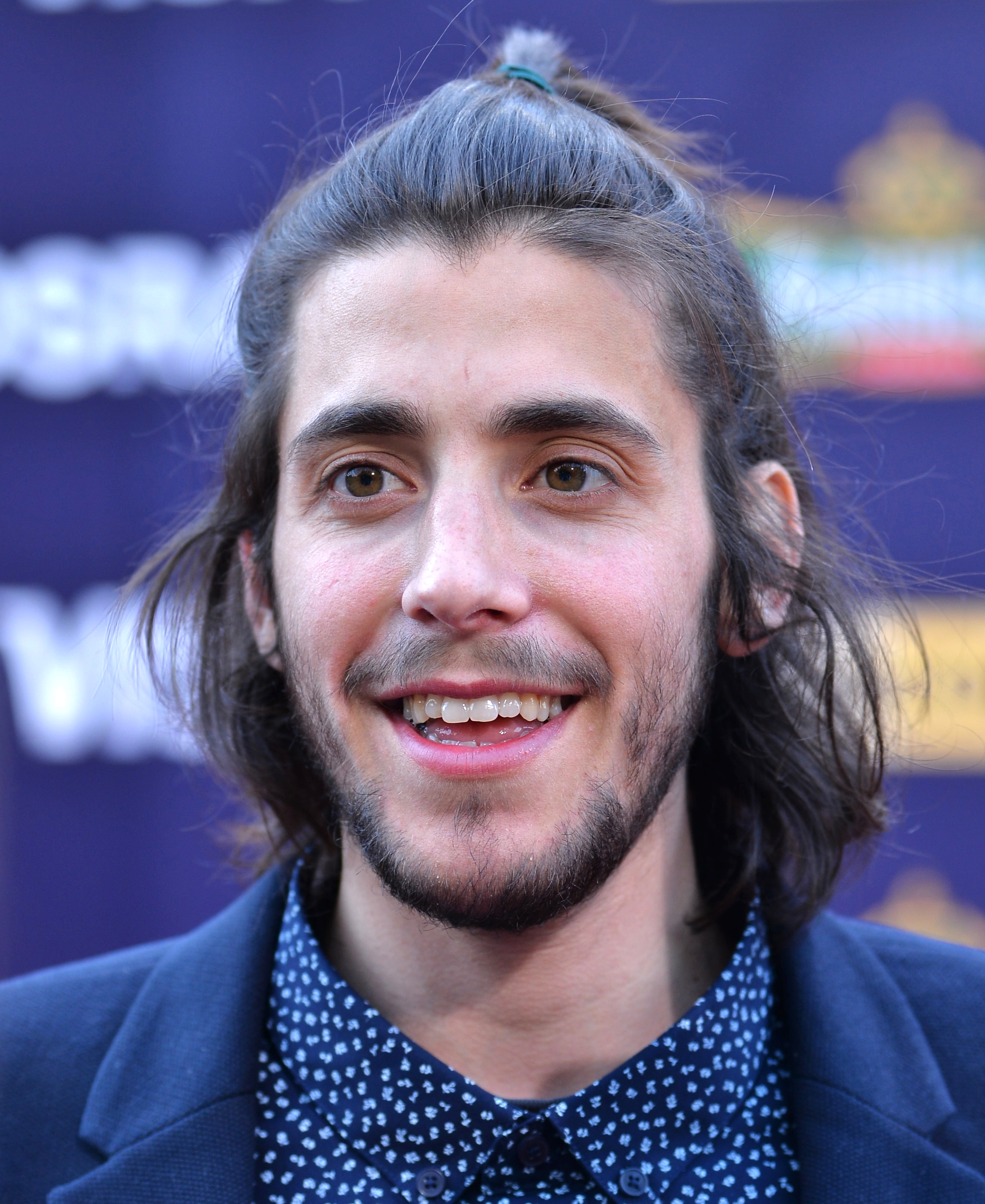
Salvador Sobral, winner of the 2017 contest for Portugal.

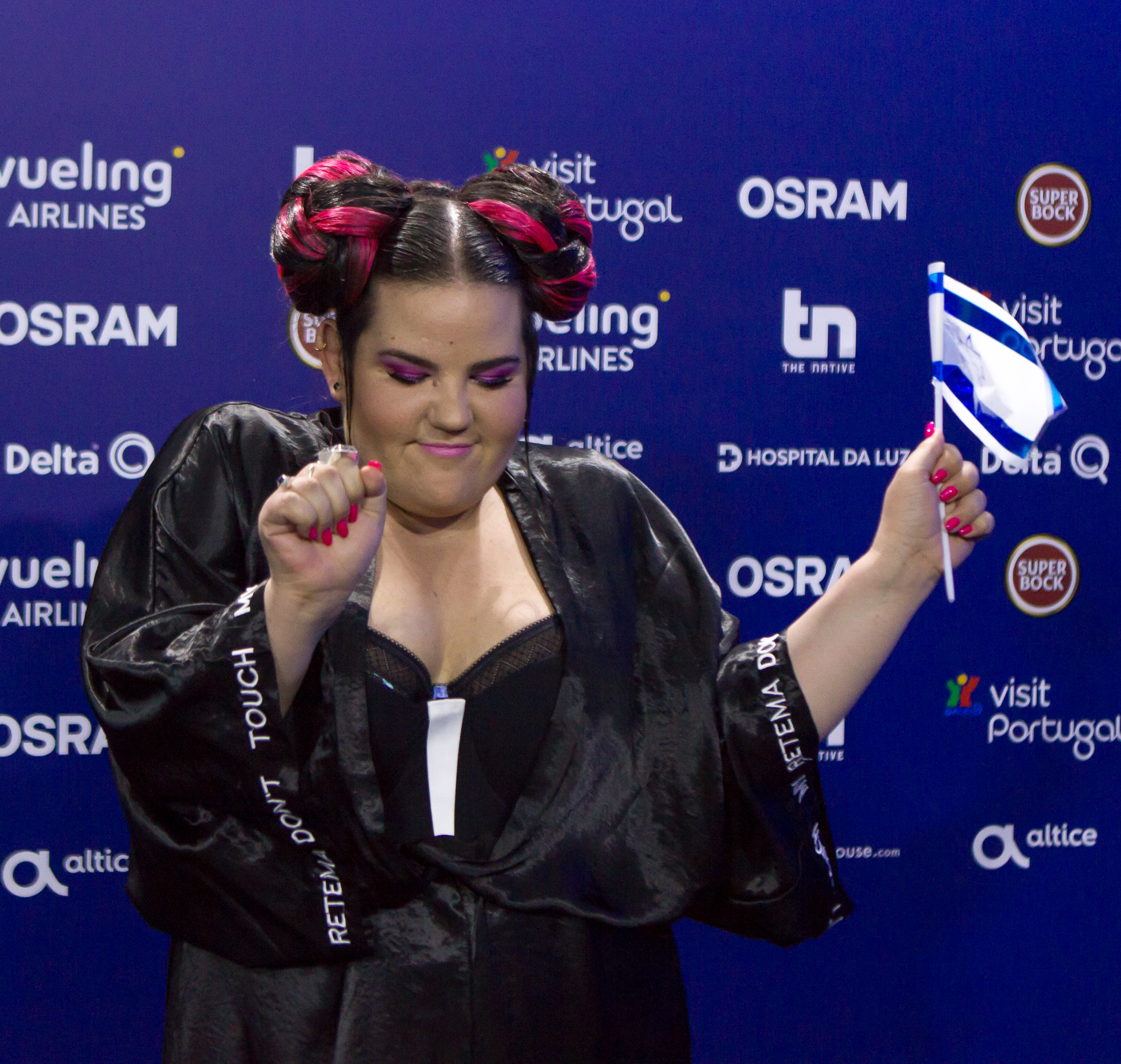
Netta, winner of the 2018 contest for Israel.

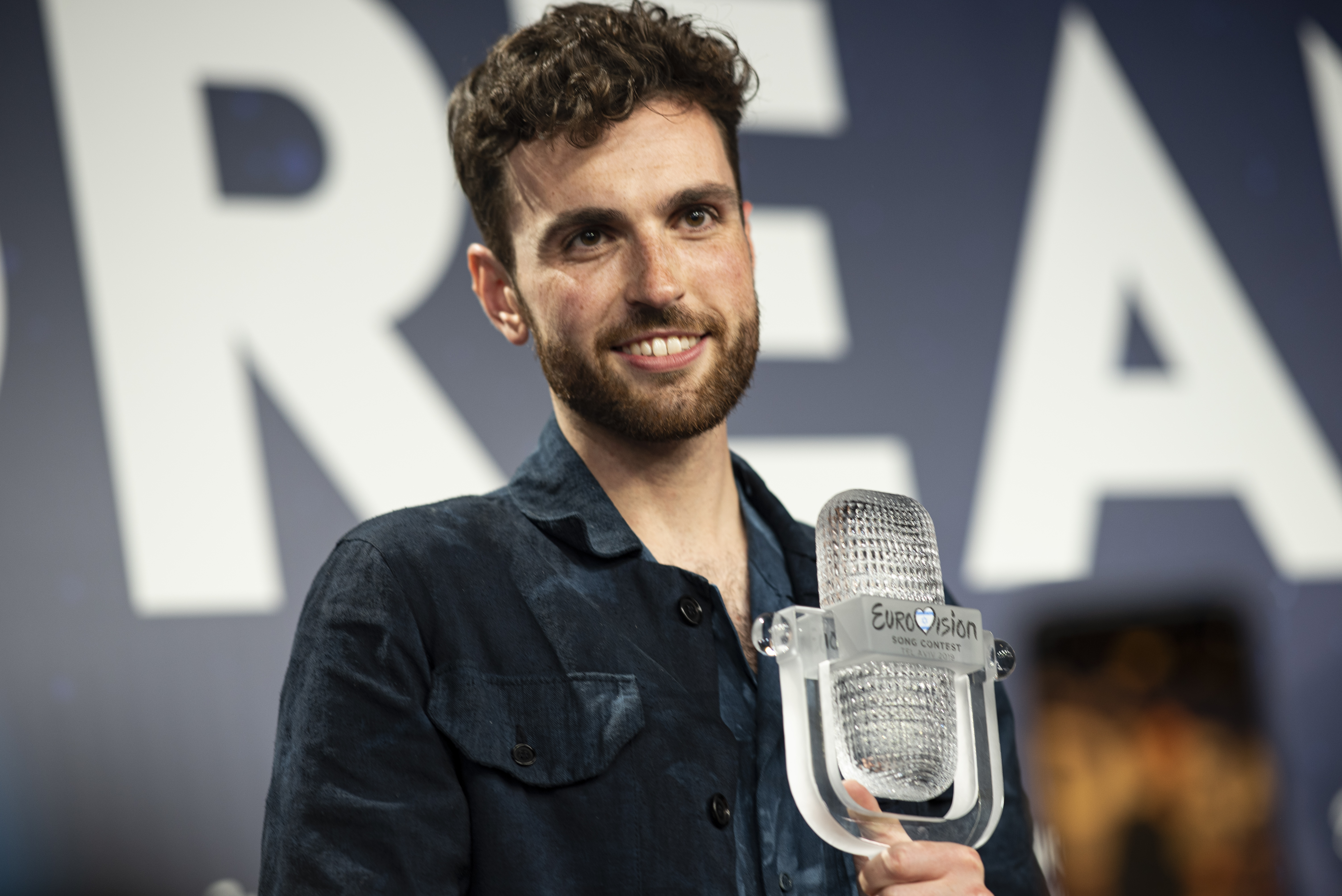
Duncan Laurence, winner of the 2019 contest for the Netherlands.

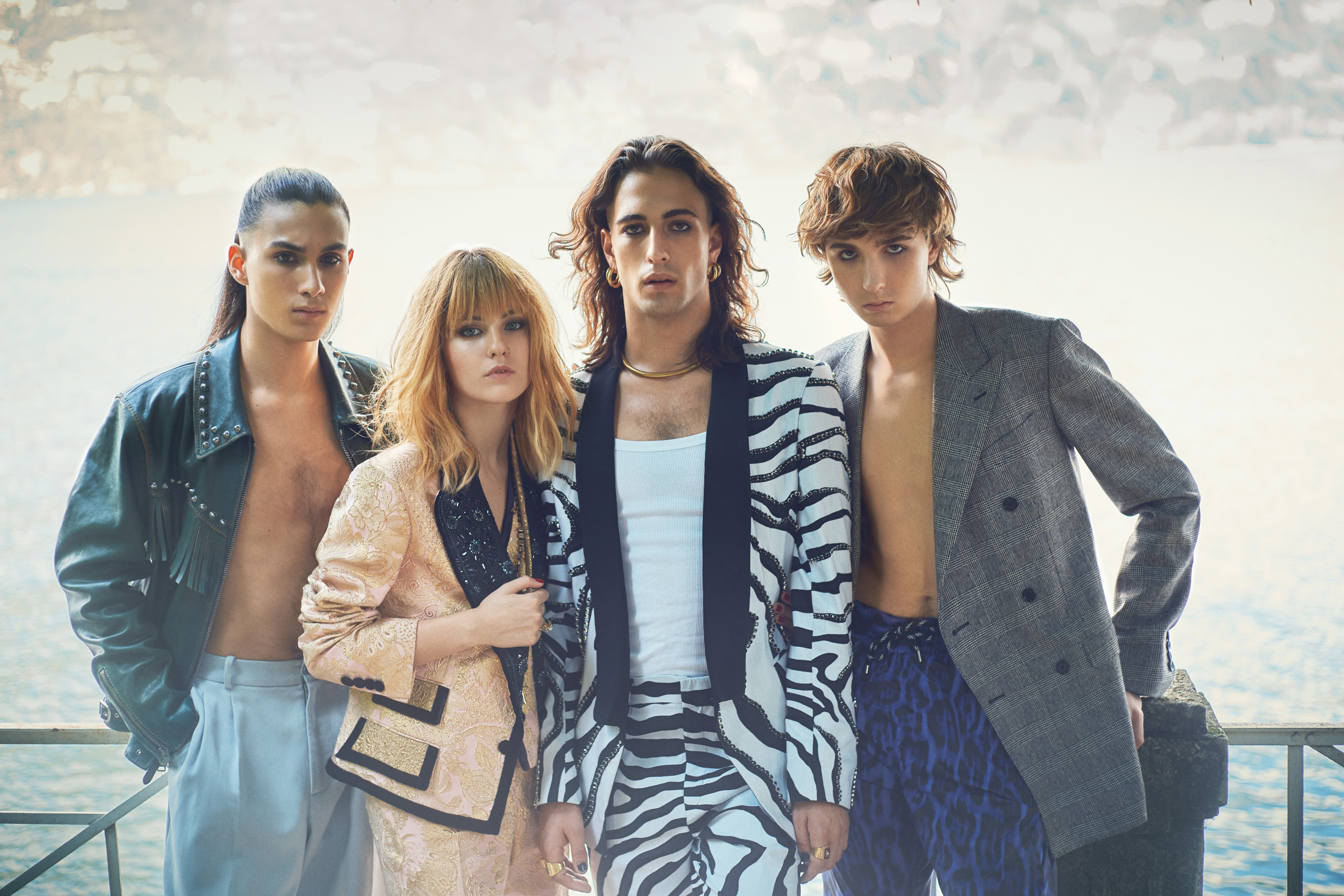
Måneskin, winners of the 2021 contest for Italy.

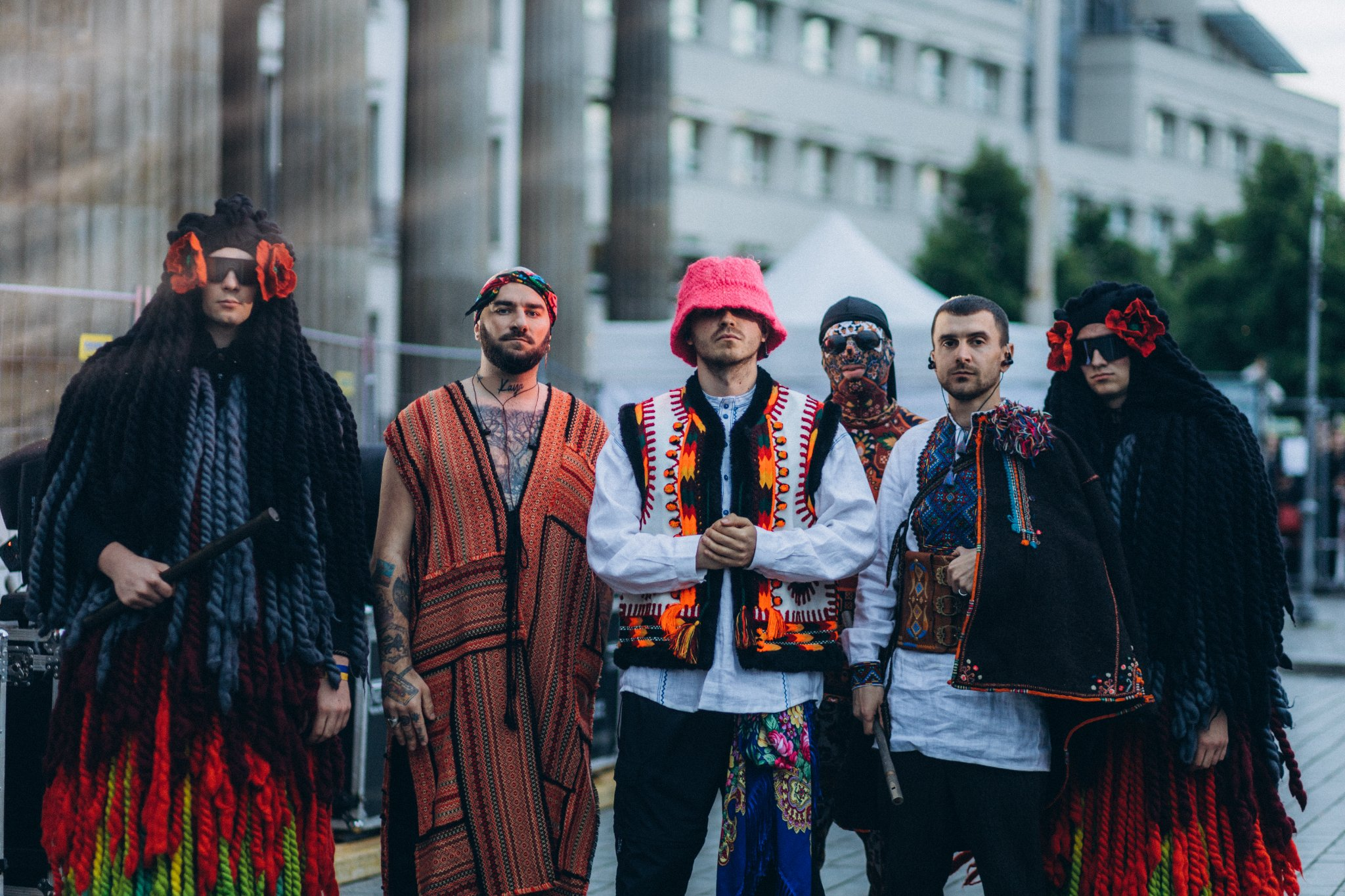
Kalush Orchestra, winners of the 2022 contest for Ukraine.

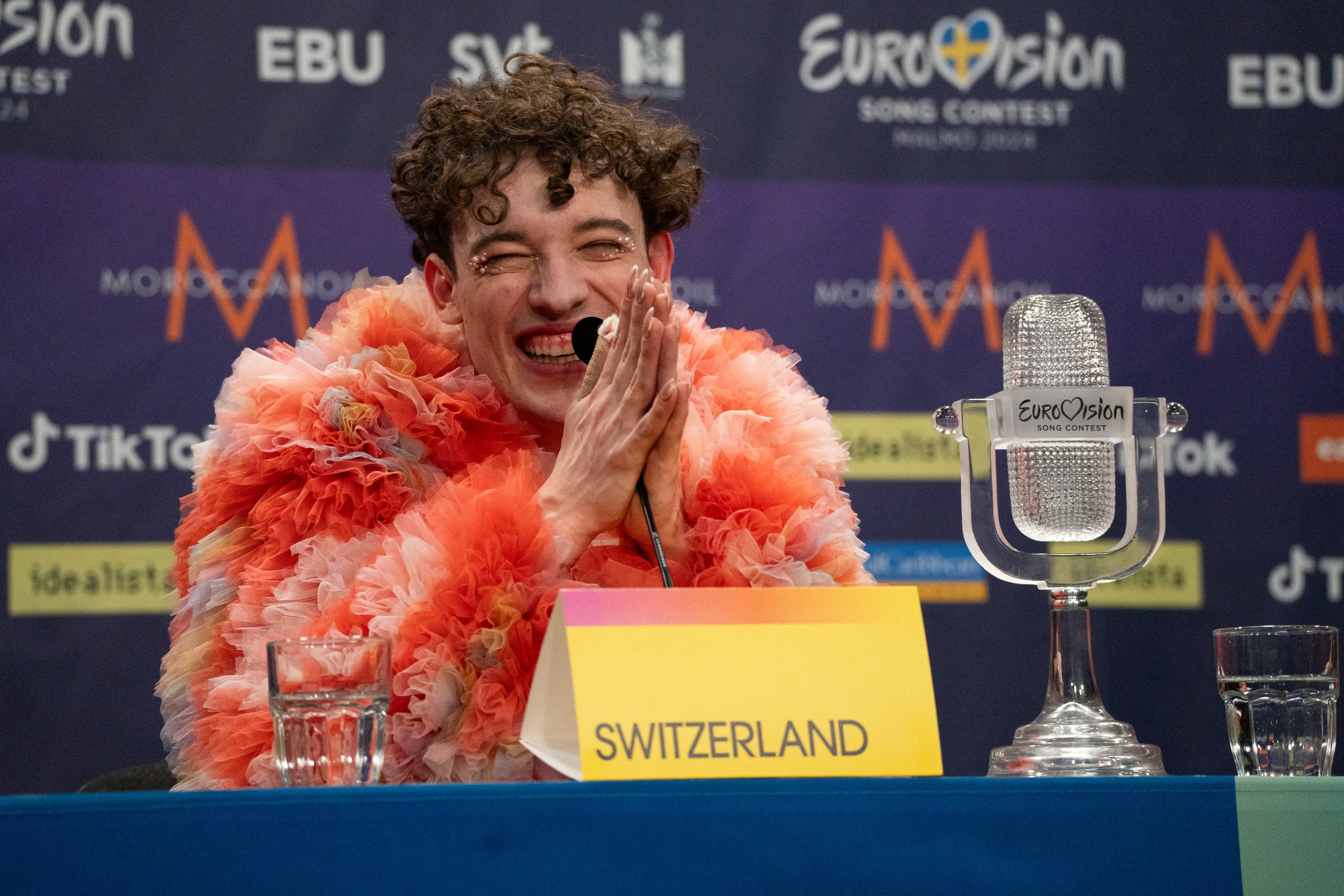
Nemo, winner of the 2024 contest for Switzerland.

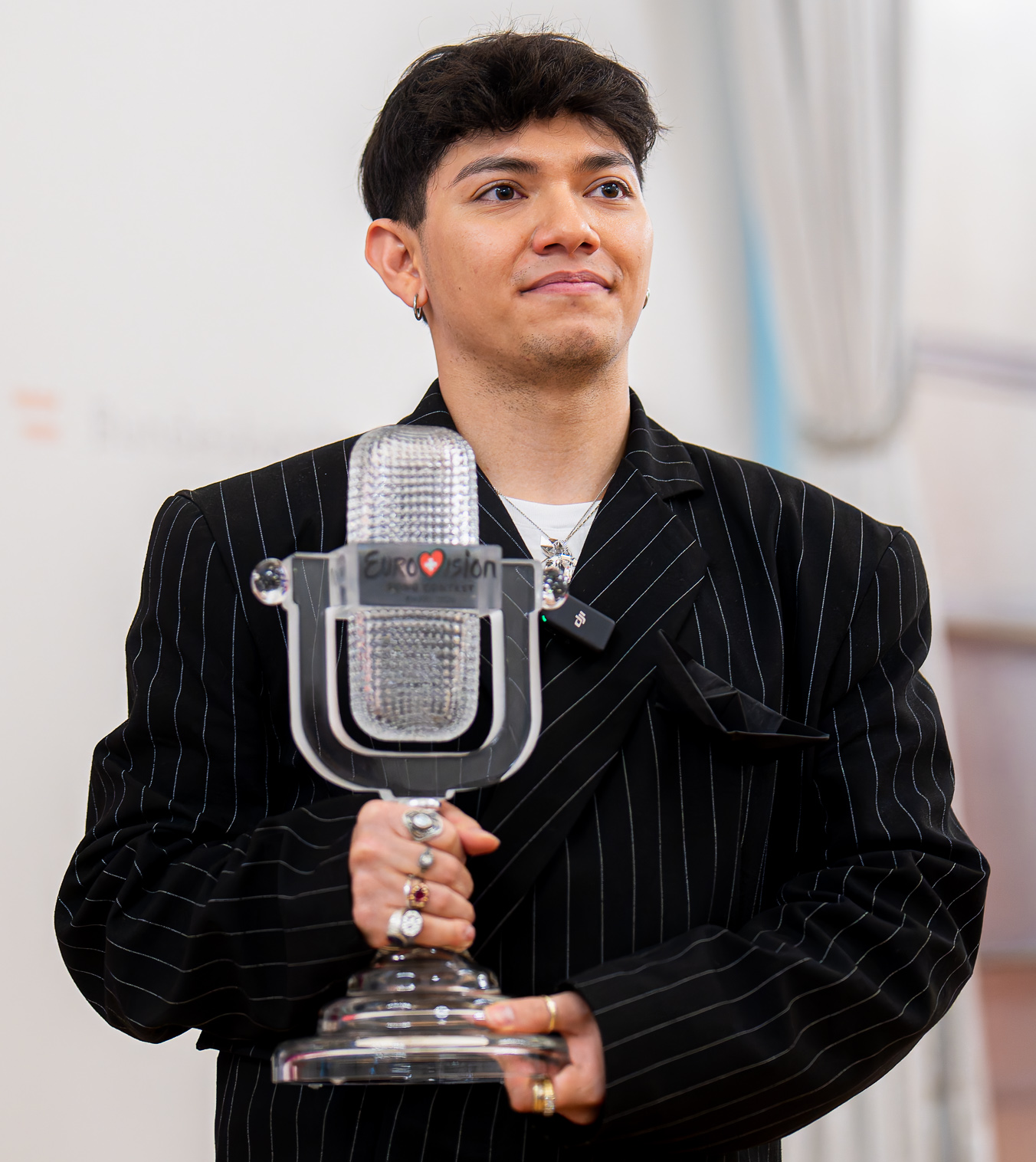
JJ, winner of the 2025 contest for Austria.

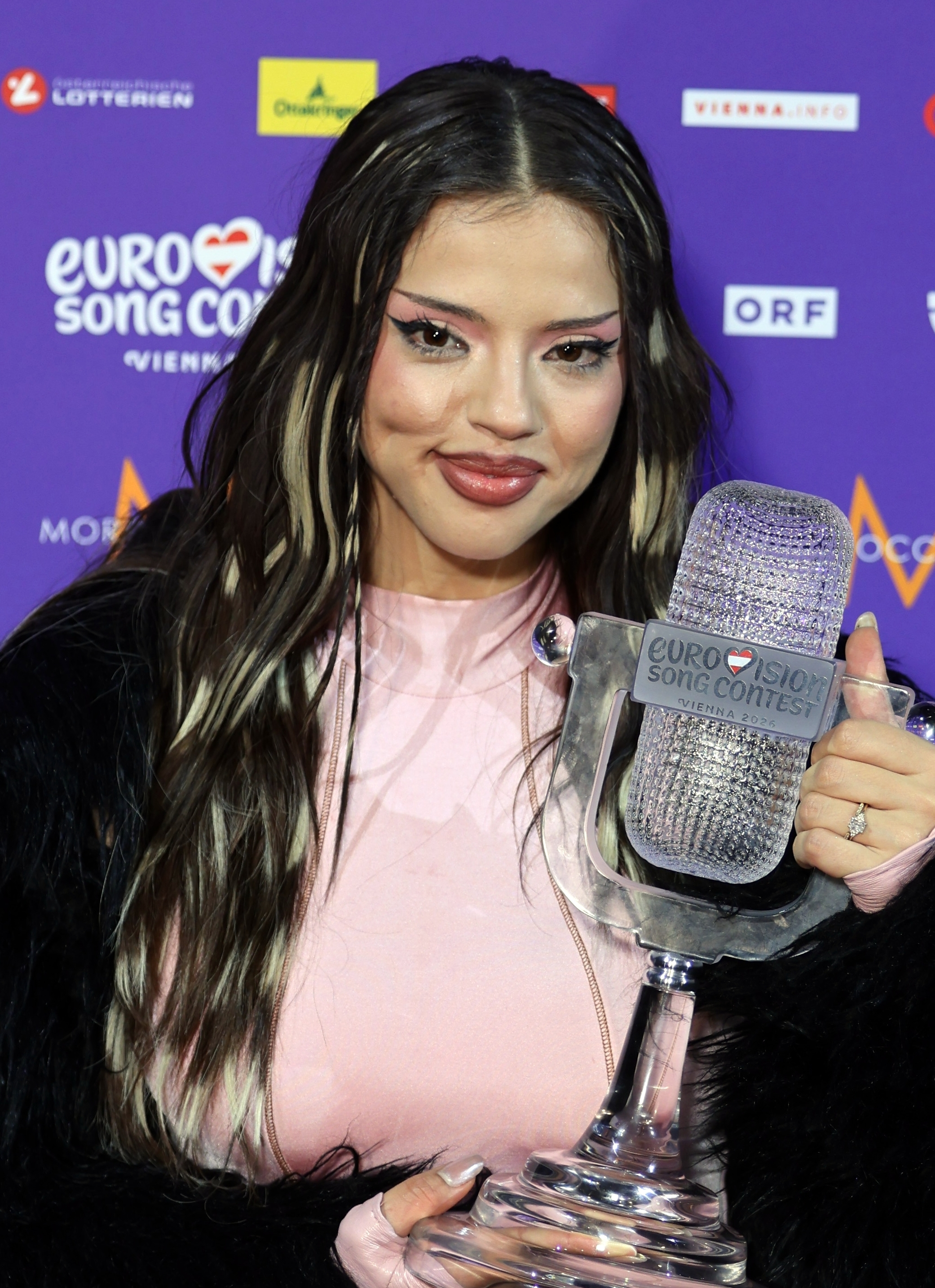
Dara, winner of the 2026 contest for Bulgaria.

=== Songwriters ===
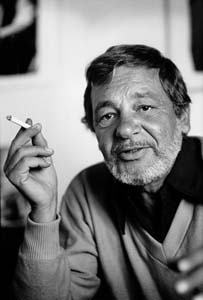
Émile Gardaz, winner of the 1956 contest for Switzerland.

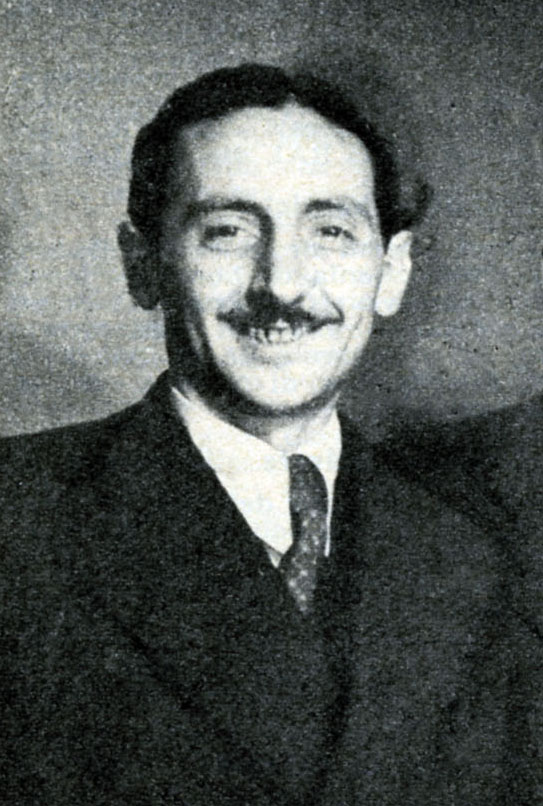
Nicola Salerno, winner of the 1964 contest for Italy.

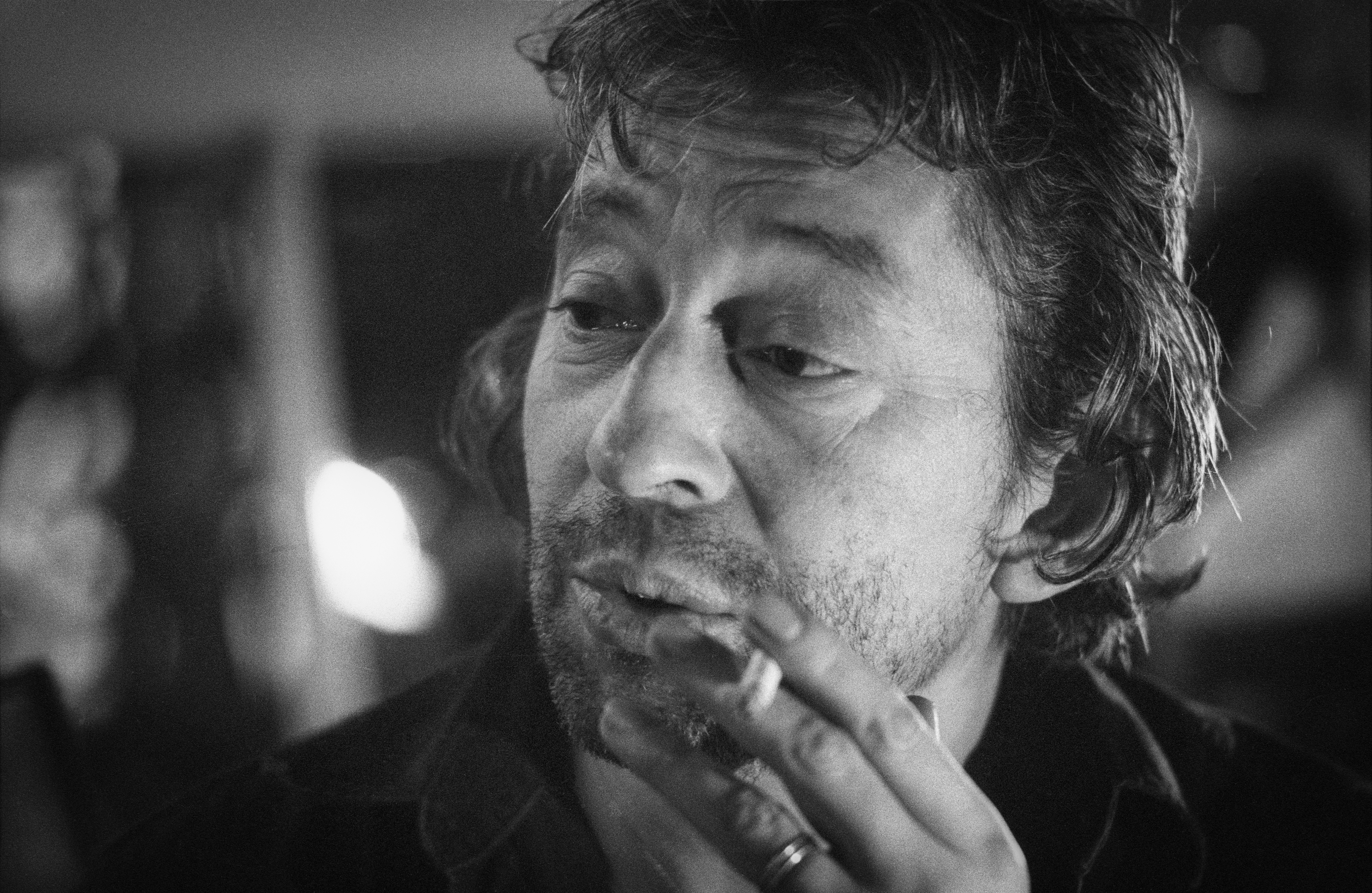
Serge Gainsbourg, winner of the 1965 contest for Luxembourg.

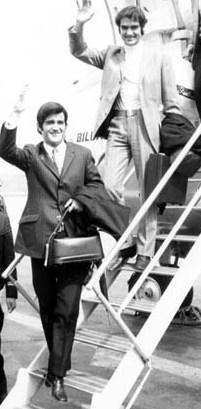
Manuel de la Calva and Ramón Arcusa (known as Dúo Dinámico), winners of the 1968 contest for Spain.

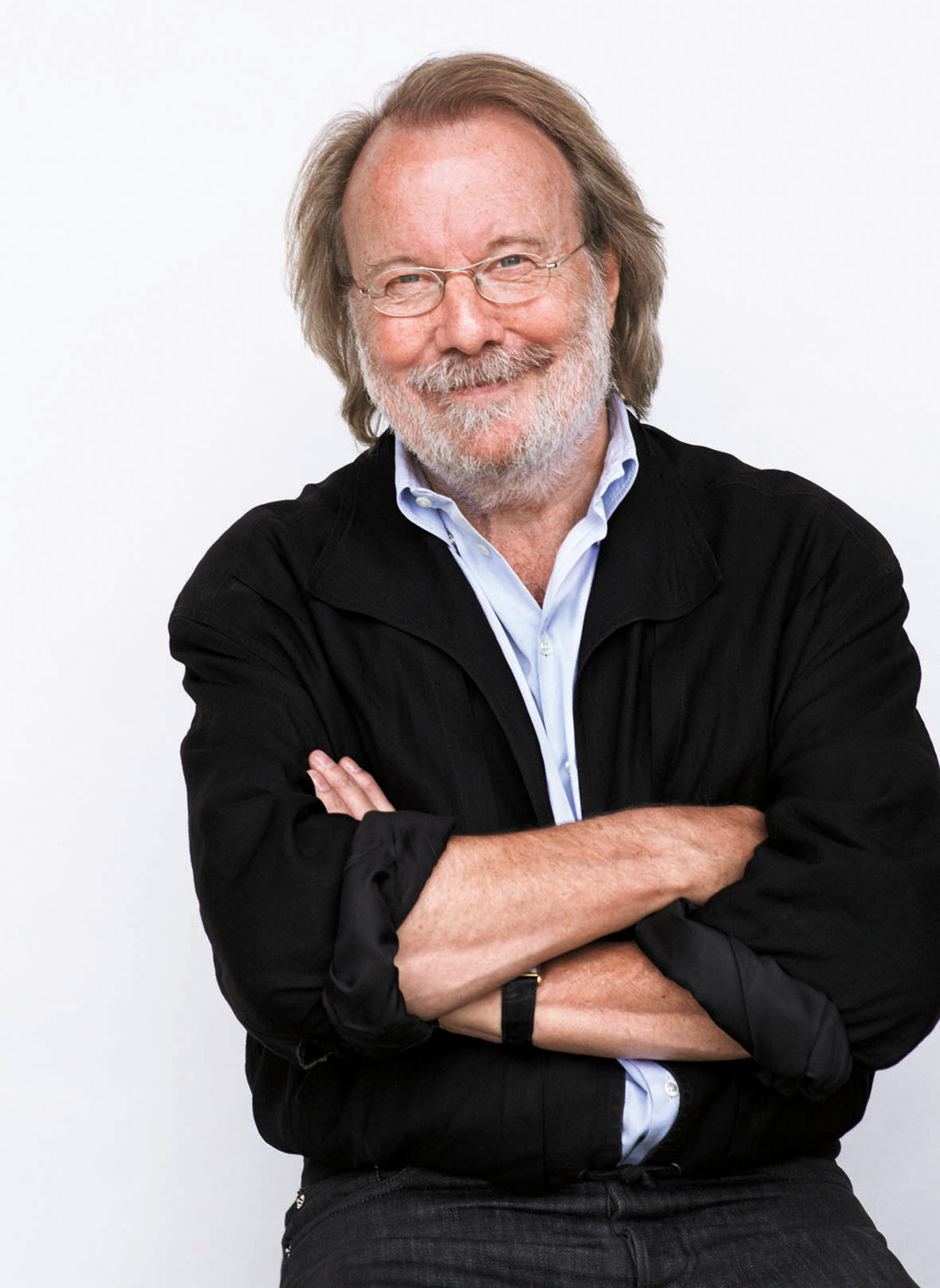
Benny Andersson, winner of the 1974 contest for Sweden.

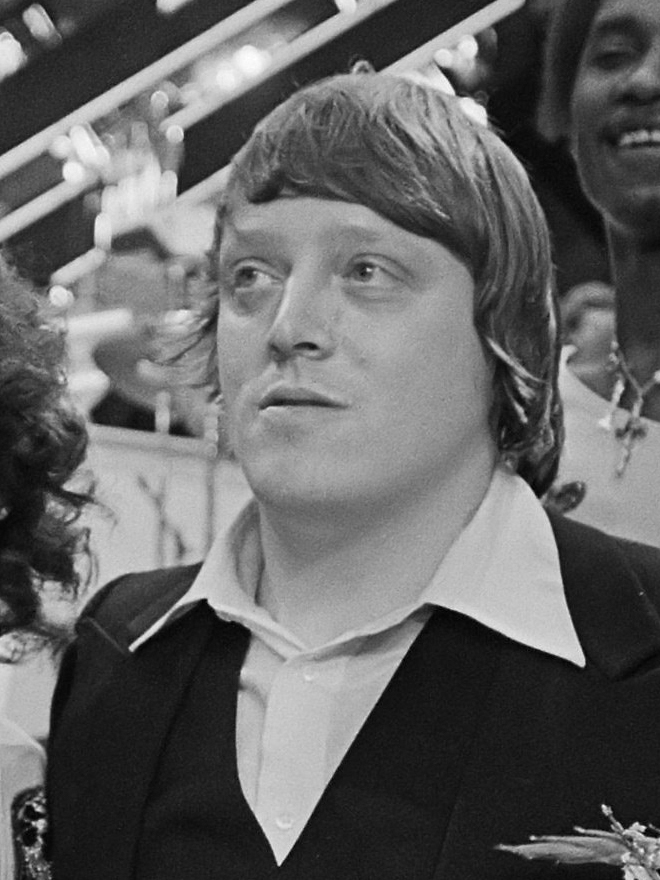
Eddy Ouwens, winner of the 1975 contest for Netherlands.

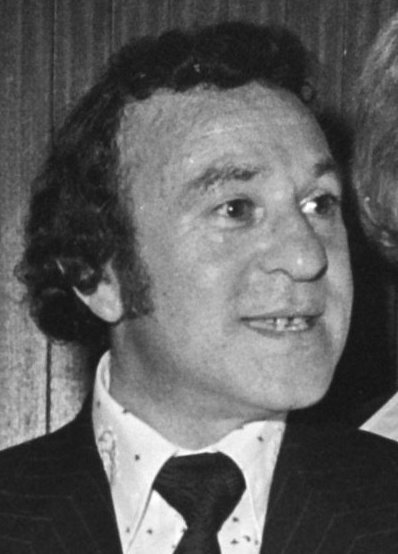
Tony Hiller, winner of the 1976 contest for United Kingdom.

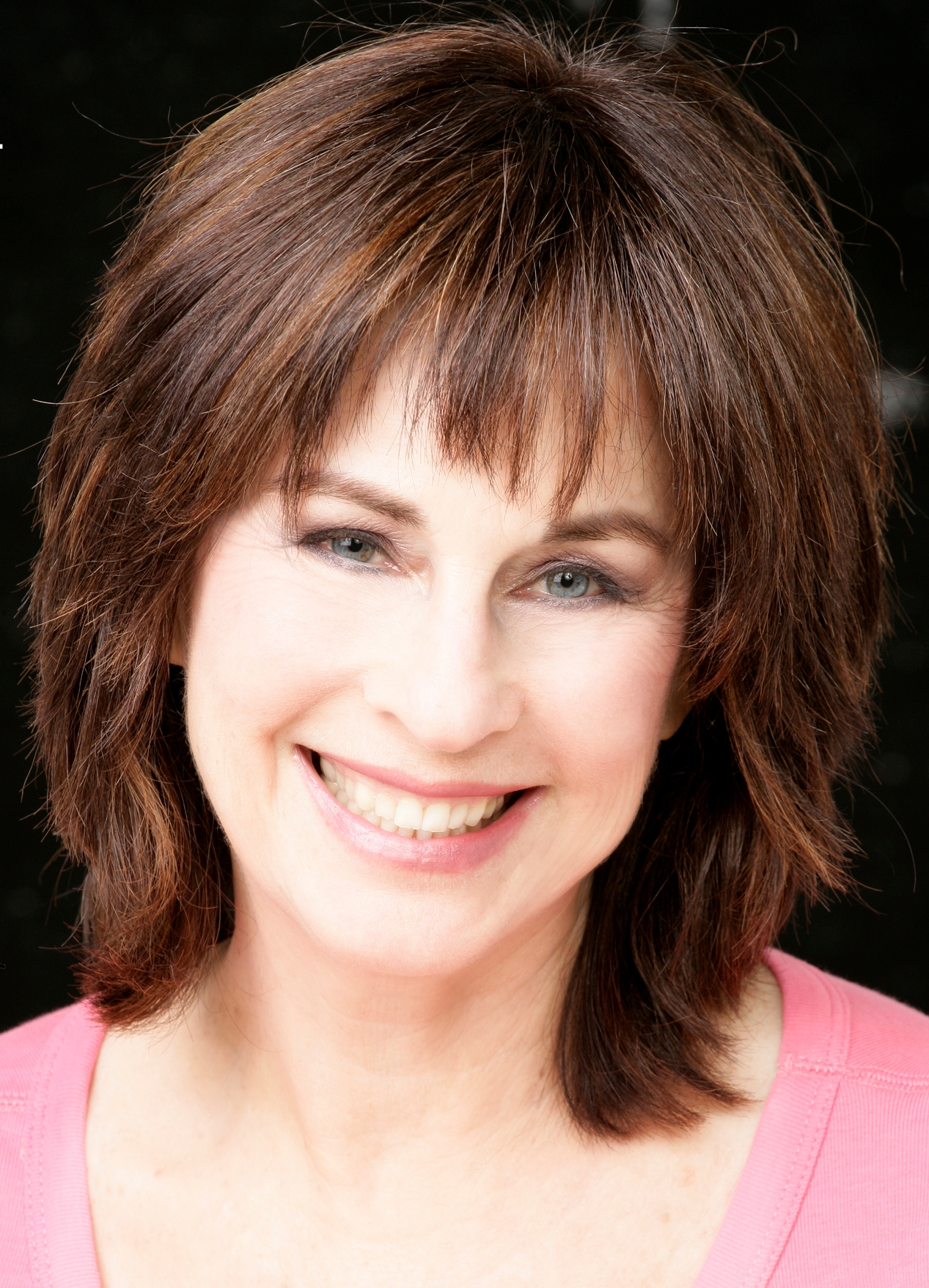
Nurit Hirsh, winner of the 1978 contest for Israel.

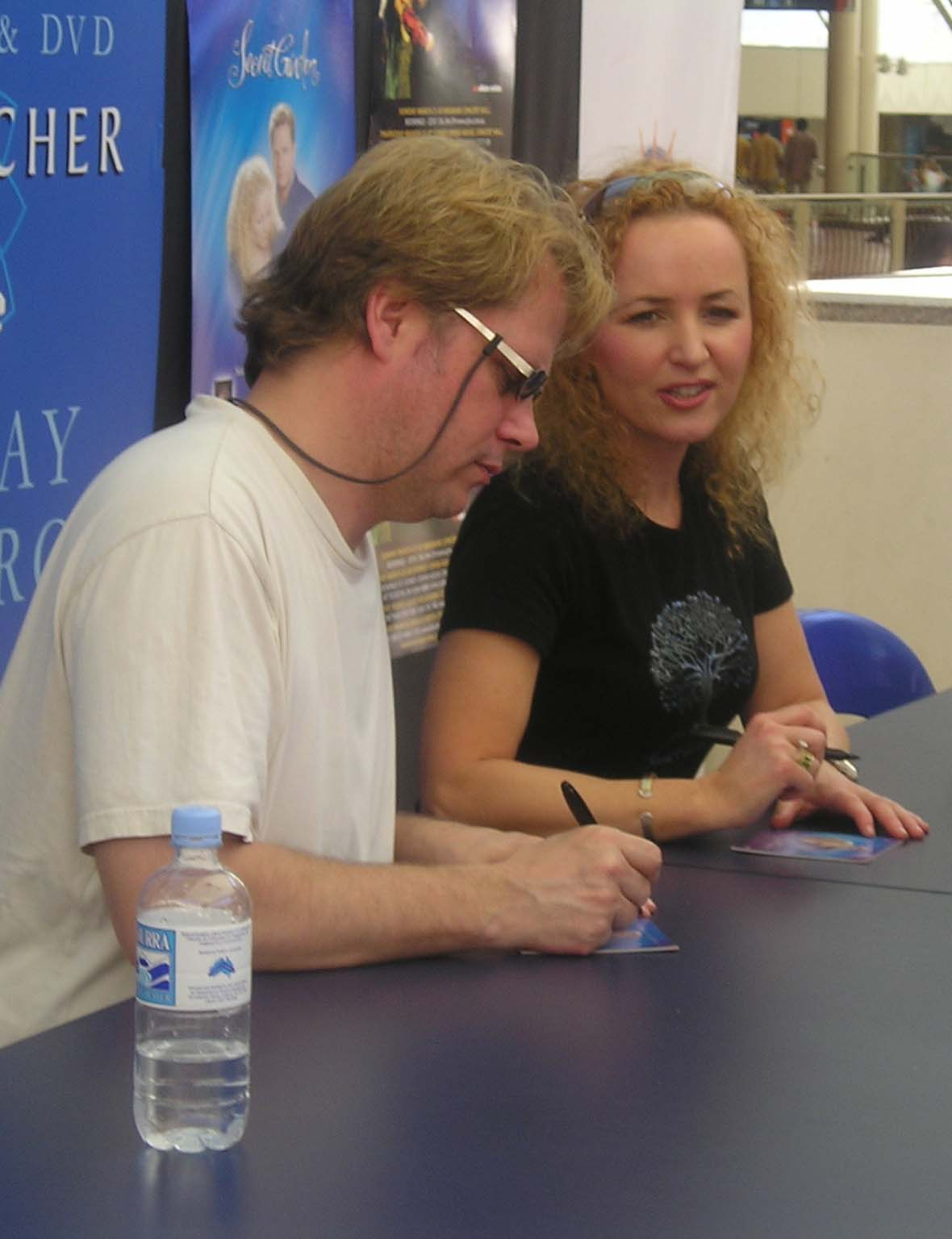
Rolf Løvland (left), winning songwriter of the 1985 and 1995 contests for Norway.

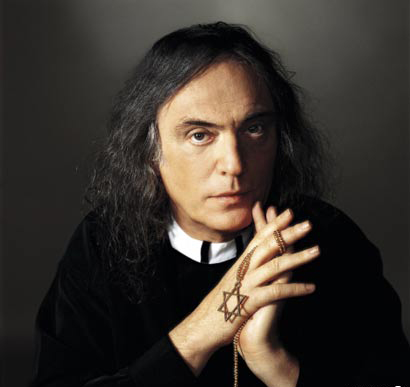
Svika Pik, winner of the 1998 contest for Israel.

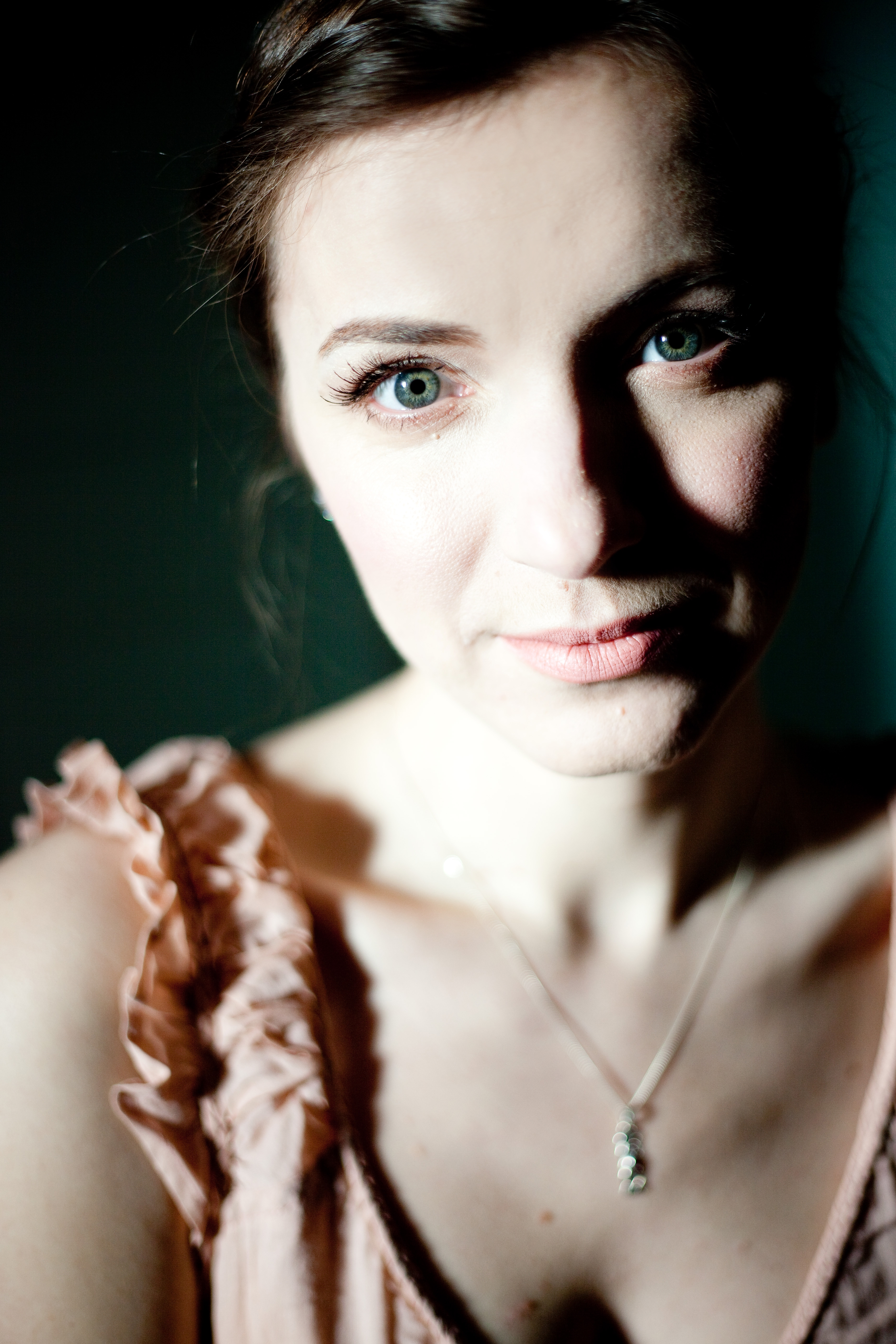
Maian Kärmas, winner of the 2001 contest for Estonia.

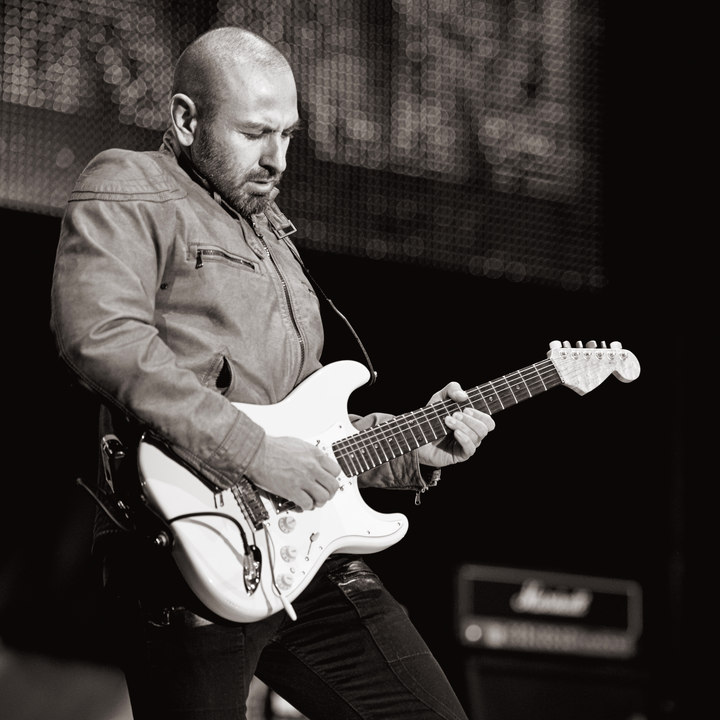
Demir Demirkan, winner of the 2003 contest for Turkey.

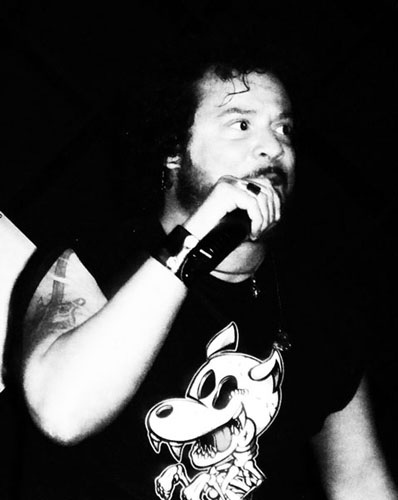
Christos Dantis, winner of the 2005 contest for Greece.

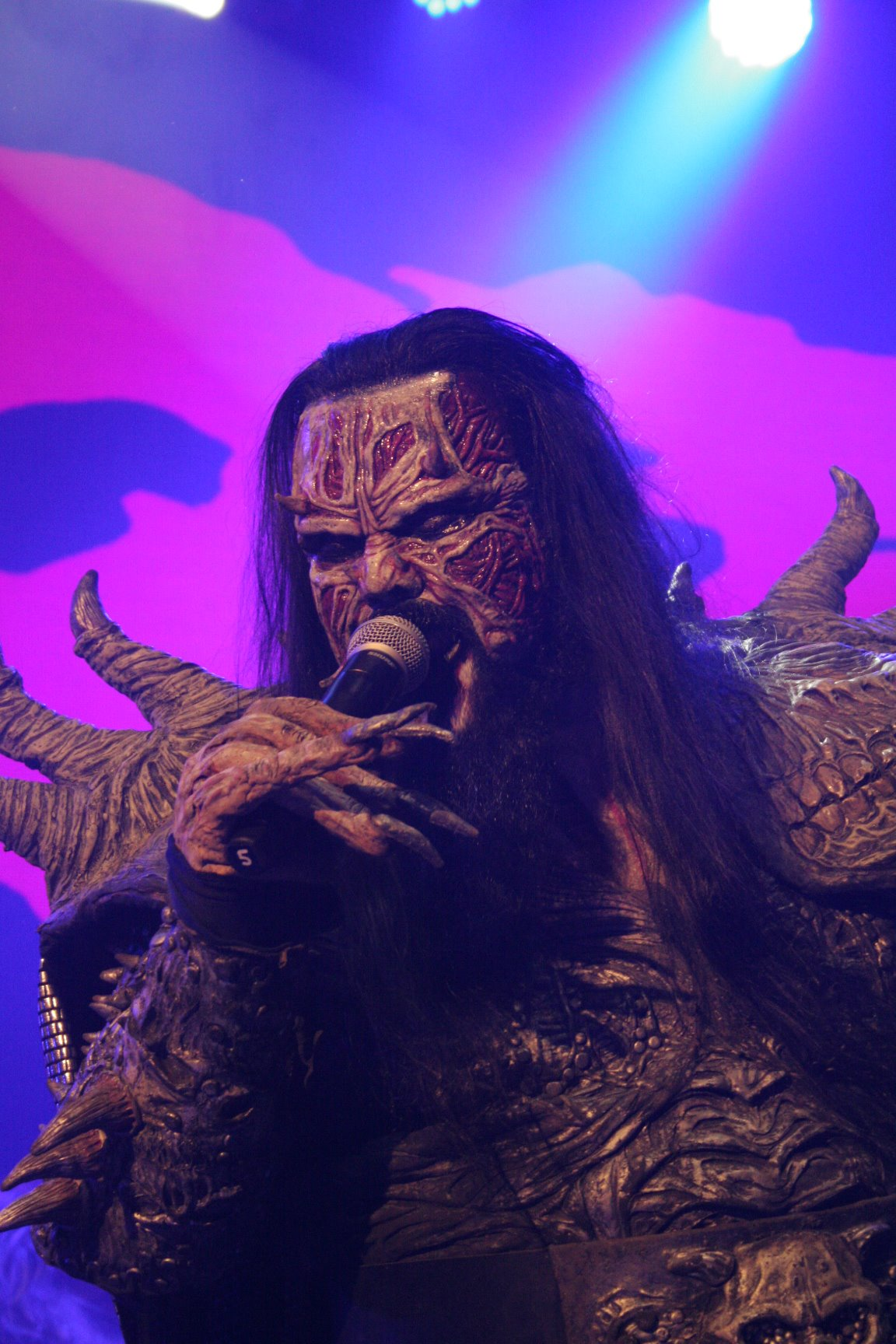
Mr Lordi, winner of the 2006 contest for Finland.

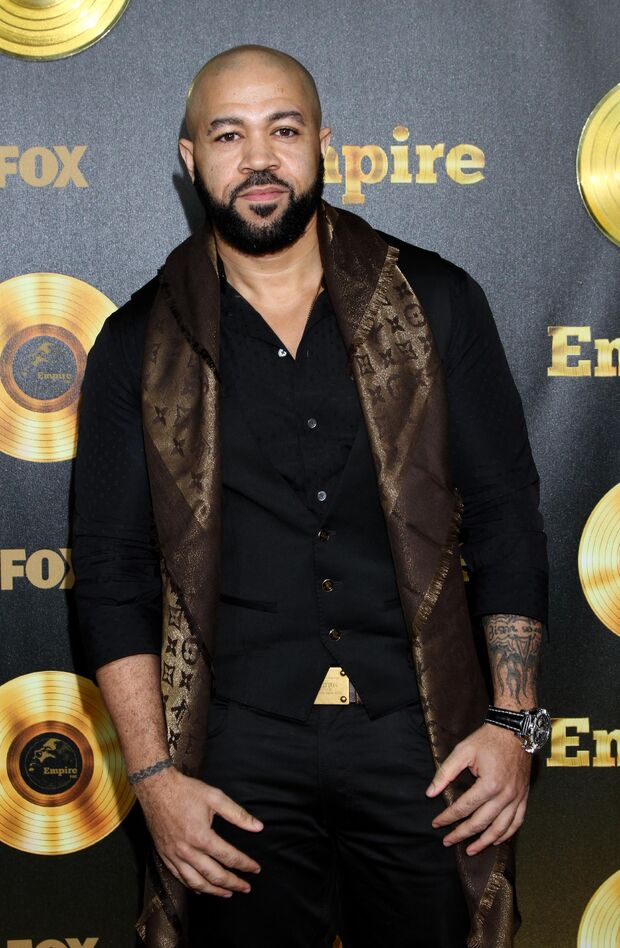
Jim Beanz, winner of the 2008 contest for Russia.

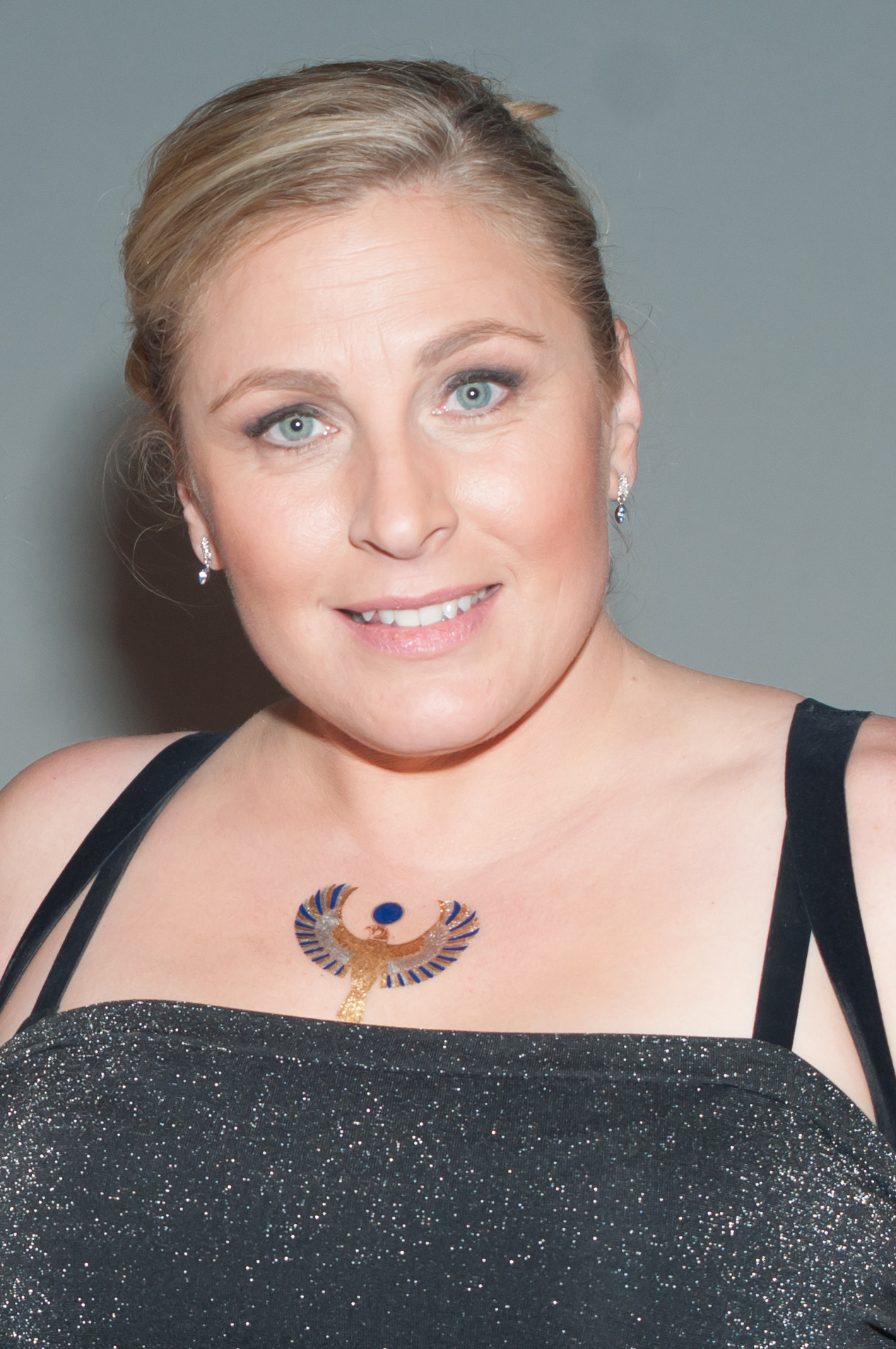
Julie Frost, winner of the 2010 contest for Germany.

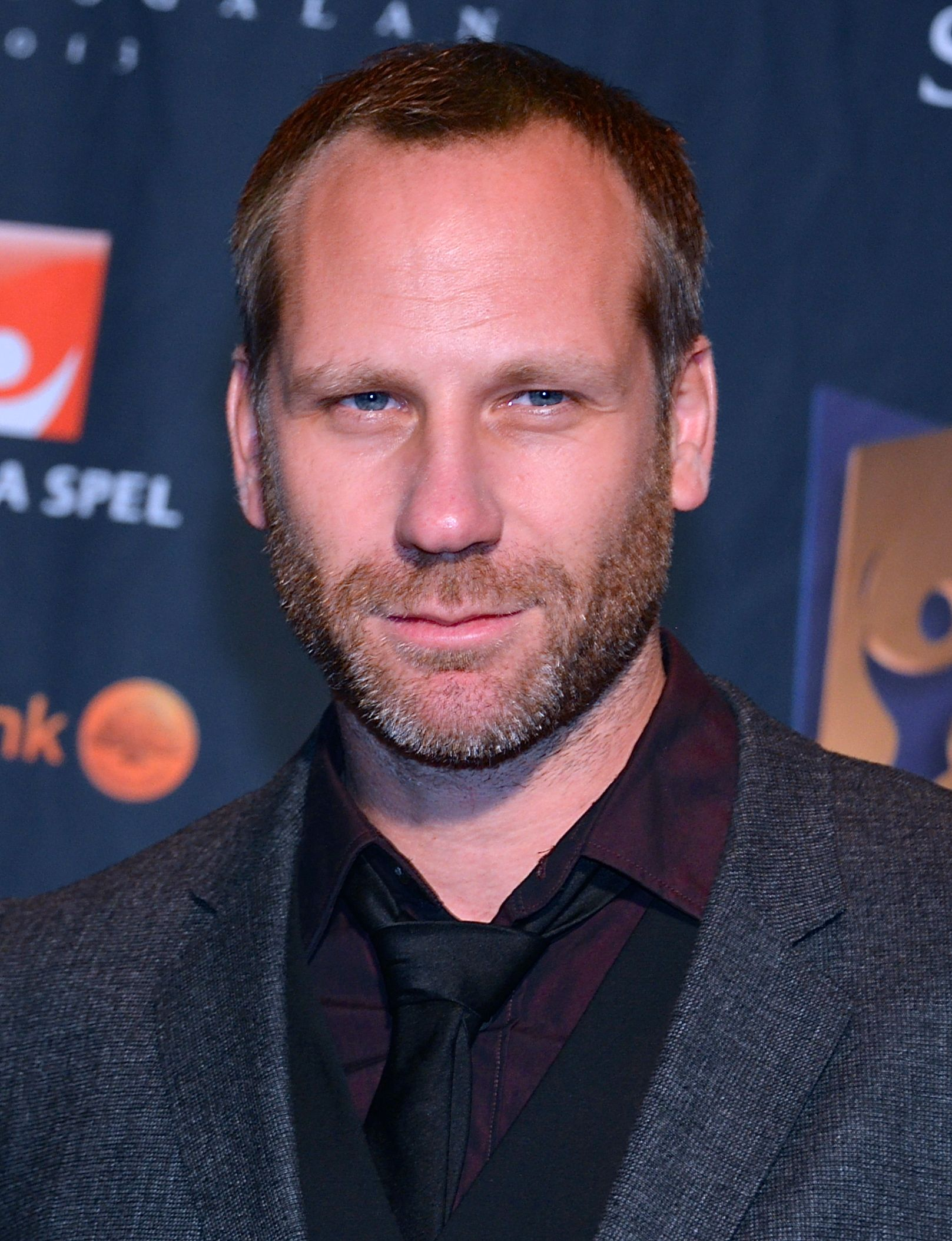
Stefan Örn, winner of the 2011 contest for Azerbaijan.

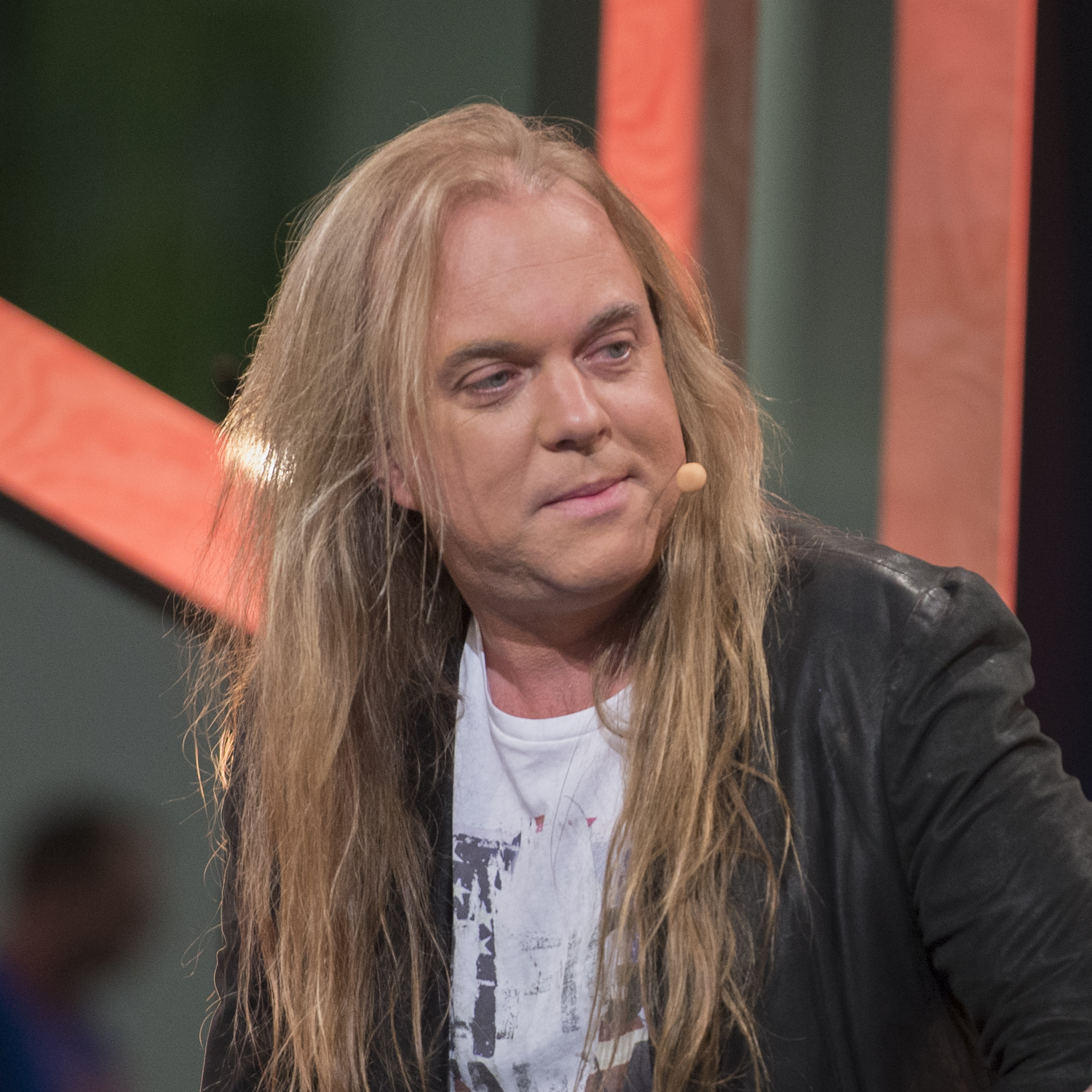
Thomas G:son, winner of the 2012 and 2023 contests for Sweden.

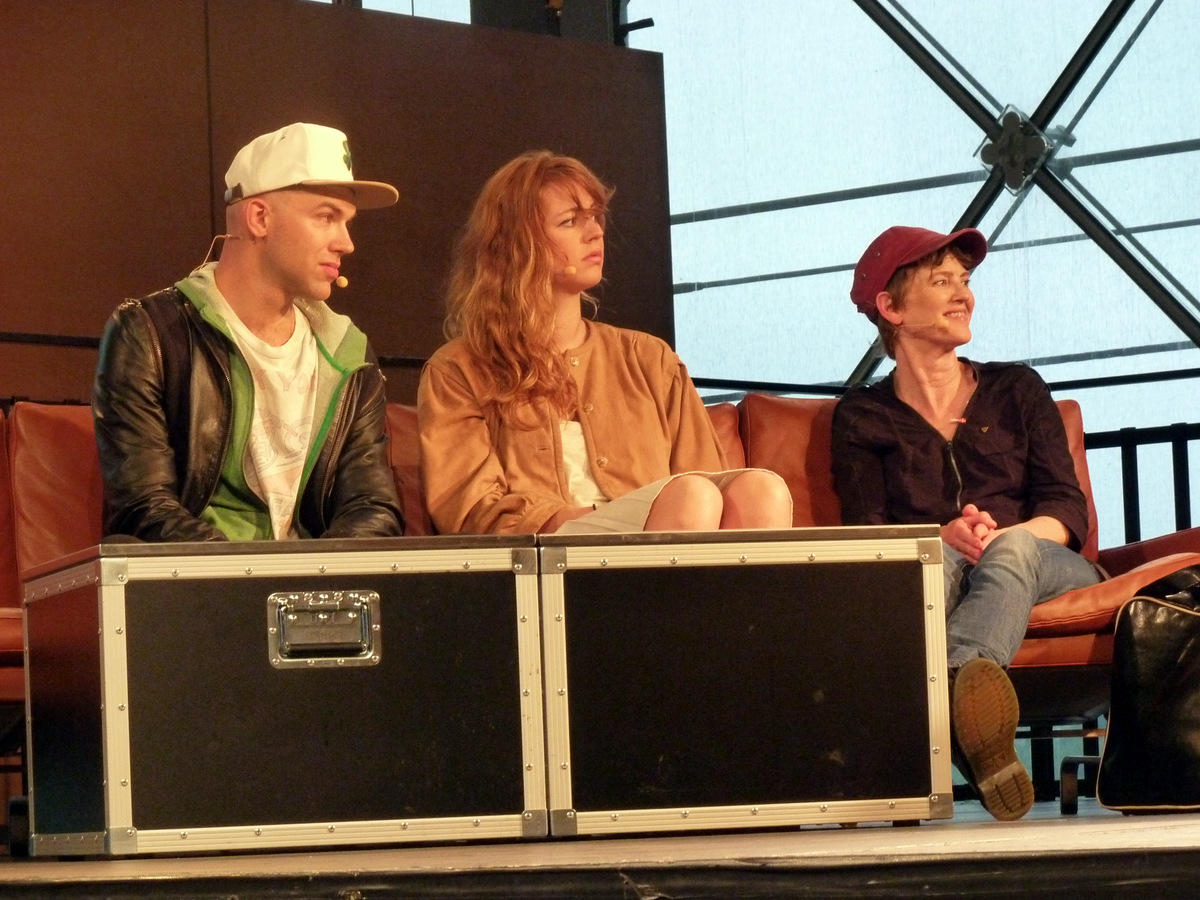
Thomas Stengaard (left), Julia Fabrin Jakobsen (centre) and Lise Cabble (right), winner of the 2013 contest for Denmark.

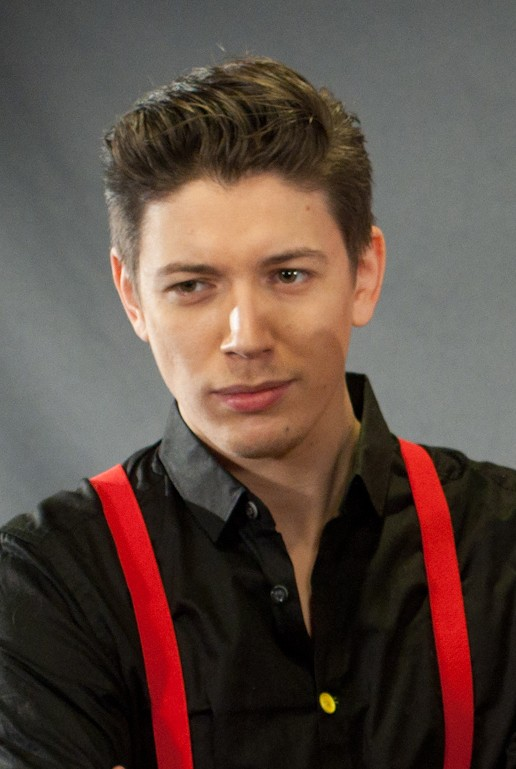
Anton Malmberg Hård af Segerstad, winner of the 2015 contest for Sweden.

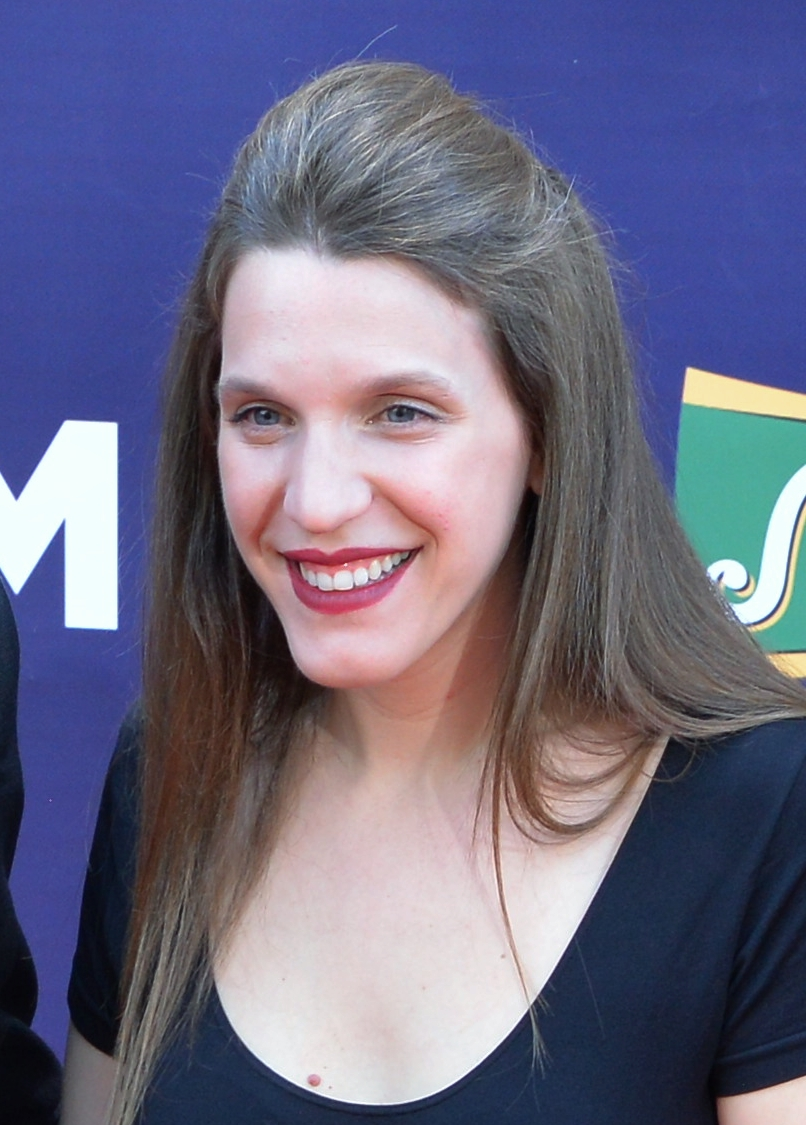
Luísa Sobral, winner of the 2017 contest for Portugal.

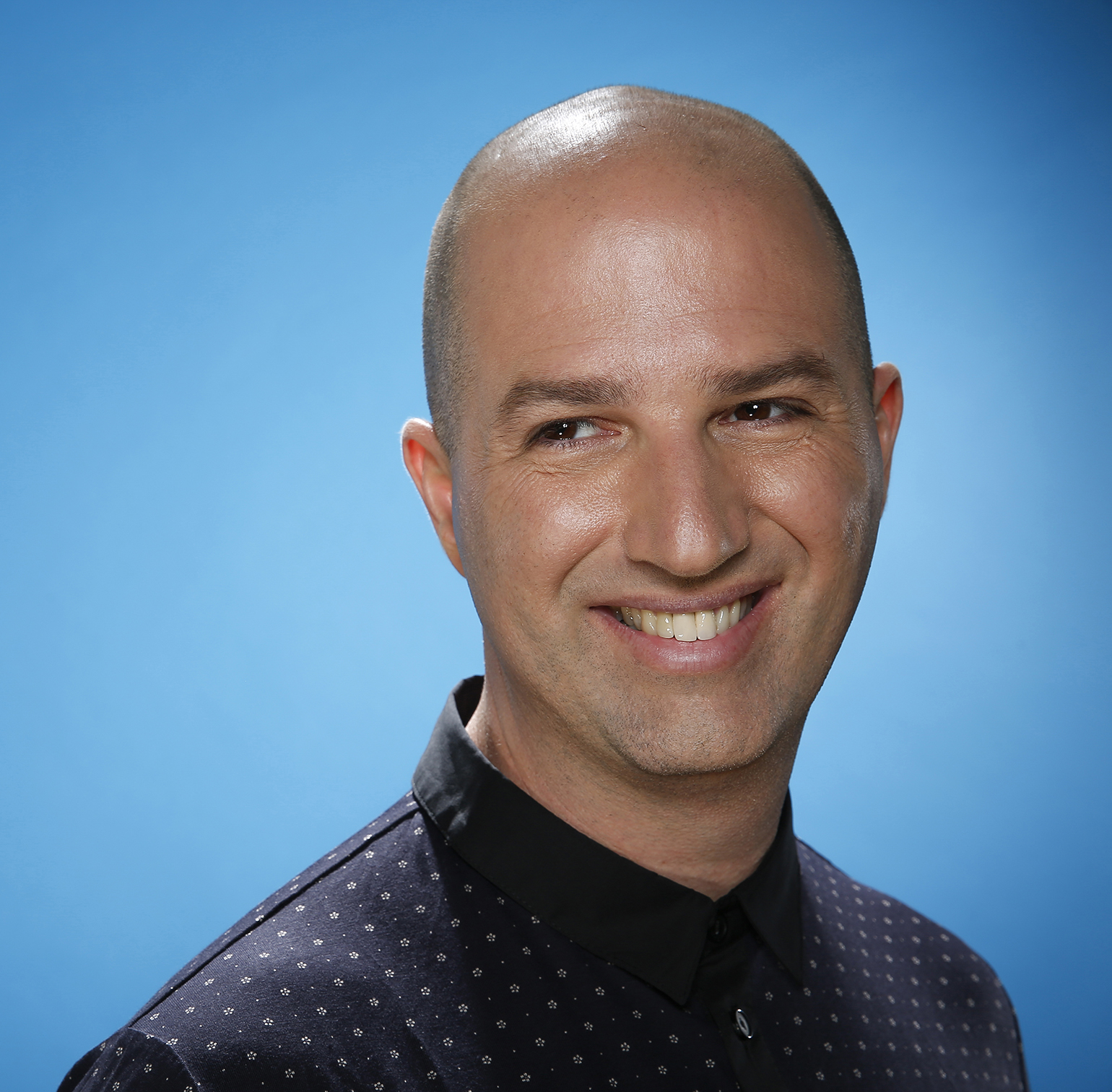
Doron Medalie, winner of the 2018 contest for Israel.

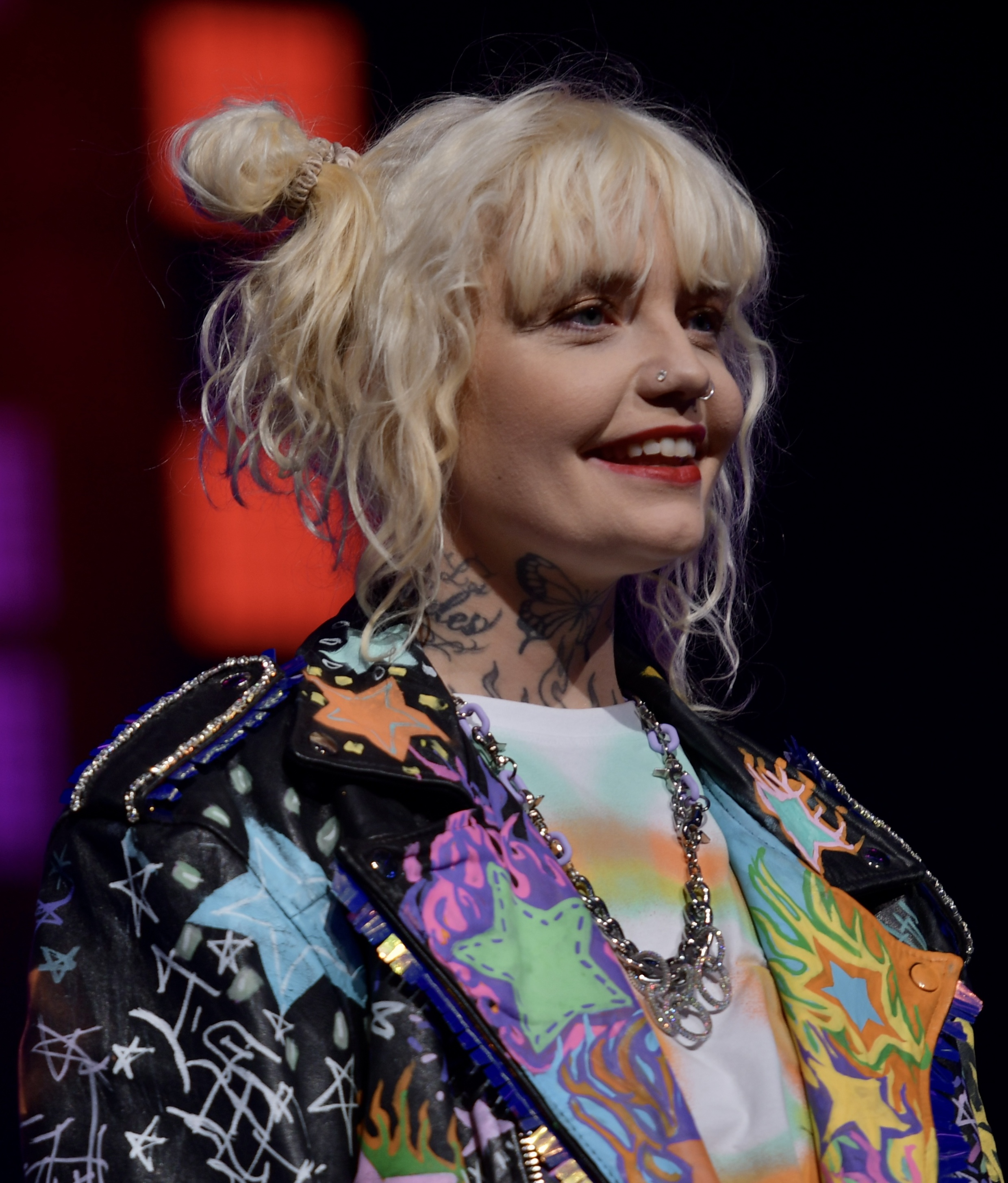
Moa Carlebecker, winner of the 2023 contest for Sweden.

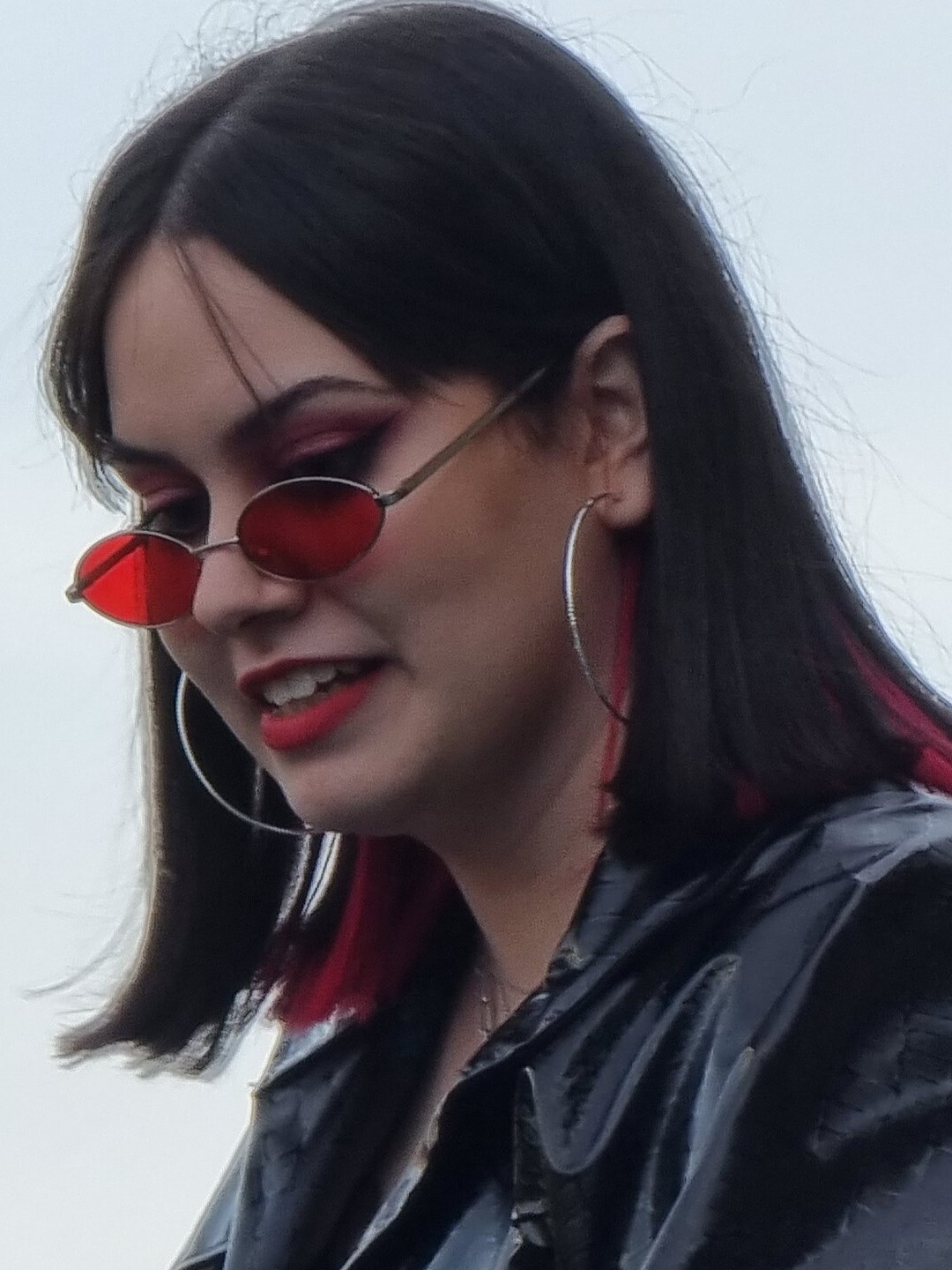
Teodora Špirić, winner of the 2025 contest for Austria.

== See also ==
- Eurovision Song Contest winners discography
- List of Junior Eurovision Song Contest winners
