= 1995 in Nordic music =

The following is a list of notable events and releases that happened in Nordic music in 1995.

== Events ==
- 19 February – Swedish duo Roxette play to a crowd of 12,000 in Beijing, China. They are the first Western band to be allowed to perform in the Workers' Indoor Arena for ten years.
- 7 April – On the first day of Norway's Vossajazz festival, Harald Dahlstrøm is awarded the festival prize.
- 13 May – Norway wins the 40th Eurovision Song Contest with the song "Nocturne", performed by Fionnuala Sherry and Rolf Løvland. Of the other Scandinavian countries competing, Sweden finish in 3rd place, Denmark in 5th place, and Iceland 15th.
- unknown date
  - The Gothenburg Symphony Orchestra records an album of Swedish Bassoon concertos, with Anders Ekström as soloist.
  - Swedish metal band In Flames is joined by Björn Gelotte (as drummer) and Anders Fridén as vocalist.

== Classical works ==
- Erik Bergman – Det sjungande trädet (opera; premièred)
- Karl Aage Rasmussen – Three Friends
- Requiem of Reconciliation – Arne Nordheim of Norway is one of 14 contributing composers.

== Hit singles ==
- Army of Lovers – "Give My Life" (#6 Sweden)
- Björk – "Army of Me" (#1 Iceland; #5 Finland)
- The Cardigans – "Carnival" (#14 Iceland)
- E-Type – "Do You Always (Have to Be Alone)?" (#8 Sweden)
- Jan Johansen – "Se på mig" (#1 Sweden; #7 Norway)
- Movetron – "Ristinolla" (#1 Finland)
- Pandora – "Don't You Know" (#1 Finland; #7 Sweden)
- Rednex – "Old Pop in an Oak" (#1 Austria, Canada, Denmark, Finland, Norway, Sweden)
- Roxette
  - "Vulnerable" (#12 Sweden)
  - "You Don't Understand Me" (#6 Spain; #7 Finland; #9 Sweden)
- Cecilia Vennersten – "Det vackraste" (#1 Sweden; #2 Norway)
- Whigfield – "Close to You" (#13 UK; #18 Denmark)

== Eurovision Song Contest ==
- Denmark in the Eurovision Song Contest 1995
- Iceland in the Eurovision Song Contest 1995
- Norway in the Eurovision Song Contest 1995
- Sweden in the Eurovision Song Contest 1995

== Film and television music ==
- Terje Rypdal – Zero Kelvin
- Michael B. Tretow – Bert – den siste oskulden
- Jean-Paul Wall & Kristoffer Wallman – Radioskugga

== Births ==
- 6 July – Noah Skaalum, Danish singer
- 8 August – Malin Reitan, Norwegian singer

== Deaths ==
- 10 April – Anja Ignatius, Finnish violinist and music teacher (born 1911)
- 13 July – Matti Pellonpää Finnish actor and musician (born 1951; heart attack)
- 4 October – Else Brems, Danish opera singer (born 1908)
- 25 November – Leif Juster, Norwegian comedian, singer and actor (born 1910)
