= Aud Wilken =

Danish-German singer (born 1965)

- Born: Aud Saskia Wilken; 1965 (age 60–61); East Berlin, East Germany
- Origin: Denmark
- Genres: Pop
- Occupation: Singer
- Formerly of: The Overlords

Aud Saskia Wilken (born 1965 in East Berlin) is a Danish-German singer, best known for her participation in the Eurovision Song Contest 1995.

== Early life and career ==
Wilken was born to a Danish father and German mother, and lived in East Germany until 1974, when the family moved to Denmark.

Her musical debut came in 1988, on the album Midnight at the Grooveyard by post-punk band The Overlords. She then appeared on The Poets' self-titled album in 1990. In the same year of 1990 she took part in the recording of the song "I Love You Love Me Love" as featuring artist for Danish musician Master Fatman. This song was written by Aud along with Morten Lindberg.

== Eurovision Song Contest ==
In 1995, Aud participated at Dansk Melodi Grand Prix. The final held on 25 March 1995 and consisted of 11 participants. She passed the first round and received 46 points in the second round, thereby winning DMGP with her song "Fra Mols til Skagen" ("From Mols to Skagen") and gaining right to represent Denmark in the Eurovision Song Contest 1995 which took place on 13 May in Dublin.

The song was performed nineteenth on the Eurovision night, following Sweden's Jan Johansen with "Se på mej" and preceding Slovenia's Darja Švajger with "Prisluhni mi". "Fra Mols til Skagen" was an unusual song for Eurovision at the time, and finished in fifth place out of 23 entries, receiving 2 sets of highest score of 12 points from Sweden and Norway. Wilken was best-placed Danish entry of the 1990s.

== Later career ==
In 1996, Wilken was invited to record the song "Summers Got the Colour" composed by Povl Kristian with text by Lars K. Andersen for the Danish crime thriller film "Pusher" directed by Nicolas Winding Refn

Wilken's solo album, Diamond in the Rough, was released in 1999. On 21 June 2004, various artists album På Danske Læber (Leonard Cohen-Sange I Danske Fortolkninger) was released. Wilken's song "Her og Nu", which was composed by Leonard Cohen and Sharon Robinson was included on the album. On 4 October 2004, one more various artists album Cornelis på danska was released with song "Jeg Havde Engang En Båd" recorded by Aud Wilken and Niels Skousen.

Wilken also participated in the Dansk Melodi Grand Prix in 2007 with her song "Husker du" ("Do You Remember"). She performed in second semifinal at 2 February 2007 and failed to qualify. After the semi-finals two wildcard selections were held for the listeners of Danish radio stations P3 and P4, who selected two songs from those rejected in the semi-finals to progress to the final. Wilken's song participated in the voting of the radio station P3 and lost to eventual champion DQ receiving 18% of voters (2nd place).

On 8 March 2007, various artists album A Tribute To Joe Meek - The Lady With The Crying Eyes was released with song "Hab Ich Das Recht" sung by Wilken.

In 2007, she moved to America, where she has been writing and composing her own songs. In 2009, she released a song, entitled, "Knowing That It's There". Originally the song was included in the album 12 Beats Per Minute (2009) of the American composer Edward Dowrick and re-released in 2013 as single. Also Wilken's voice can be heard in other works of Dowrick. In "Carry Across the Epoch", "Cathedral of Hidden Light" and "Rockin Mummer Mermaid" from 2017 album Everyone Loves a Story; "Circle of Ease" and "The Witness" from 2018 album Orchestral Sketches from the New Hope Continent; "Fluidity" from 2019 album Illuminated Realities; "The Yellow Spinning of a New Appearing Chord" from 2020 album Musings of the Solar Winds.

In 2017 she recorded three songs with Knud Odde: "Lavender Graa", "Zahrtmanns Have" and "Salamander". All songs were included in the mini album I Zahrtmanns Have and released on 3 October, 2017.

== Discography ==
=== Albums ===
Wilken has only one solo album. Diamond in the Rough was released on 2 August, 1999 in two versions CD and Vinyl.

No.	Title	Writer(s)	Length
1.	"Brace Yourself"	Aud Wilken (l), Remee (m&l)	3:48
2.	"Over and Over"	A.Wilken (m&l), Kasper Winding (m), Thomas Blachman (m)	3:08
3.	"Time"	A.Wilken (m&l), K.Winding (m), Remee (m), T.Blachman (m)	3:55
4.	"Tired Hangs the Head"	Nils Lassen (m&l)	3:21
5.	"Beauty Spoils the Boy"	T.Winding (m&l)	3:43
6.	"Boy of a 1000 Tears"	N.Lassen (m&l)	3:41
7.	"Journey"	A.Wilken (l), K.Winding (m), Remee (m), T.Blachman (m)	3:22
8.	"Sweetest Mystery"	A.Wilken (l), K.Winding (m)	4:21
9.	"Ein Schatten in Der Strasse"	A.Wilken (m&l), T.Blachman (m)	3:47
10.	"Days of My Life"	A.Wilken (m&l), T.Blachman (m)	3:25
11.	"Fools Fall in Love"	A.Wilken (m&l), Remee (m&l), K.Winding (m), T.Blachman (m)	2:37
Total length:			39:03

=== Singles ===
- Master Fatman feat. Audrey Wilkens - "Baby I Need You More And More" (1990)
- Aud Wilken - "Fra Mols til Skagen" (1995)
- Aud Wilken - "Beauty Spoils the Boy" (1999)
- Aud Wilken - "Sweetest Mystery"(1999)
- Aud Wilken - "Tired Hangs the Head" (1999)
- Aud Wilken - "Husker Du" (2007)
- Aud Wilken - "Knowing That It's There" (2009/2013)

=== Other songs ===
- Aud Wilken - "Summers Got the Colour" (1996)
- Aud Wilken - "Her og Nu" (2004)
- Niels Skousen and Aud Wilken - "Jeg Havde Engang En Båd" (2004)
- Aud Wilken - "Hab Ich Das Recht" (2007)
- Knud Odde feat. Aud Wilken - "Lavender Graa" (2017)
- Knud Odde feat. Aud Wilken - "Zahrtmanns Have" (2017)
- Knud Odde feat. Aud Wilken - "Salamander" (2017)

Preceded by Tommy Seebach Band with Under stjernerne på himlen	Denmark in the Eurovision Song Contest; 1995	Succeeded by Kølig Kaj with Stemmen i mit liv
