= Portugal in the Eurovision Song Contest 1995 =

- Eurovision Song Contest 1995
- Participating broadcaster: Radiotelevisão Portuguesa (RTP)
- Country: Portugal
- Selection process: Festival RTP da Canção 1995
- Selection date: 7 March 1995

Competing entry
- Song: "Baunilha e chocolate"
- Artist: Tó Cruz
- Songwriters: António Victorino d'Almeida; Rosa Lobato de Faria

Placement
- Final result: 21st, 5 points

Participation chronology

Portugal was represented at the Eurovision Song Contest 1995 with the song "Baunilha e chocolate" composed by António Victorino d'Almeida, with lyrics by Rosa Lobato de Faria, and performed by Tó Cruz. The Portuguese participating broadcaster, Radiotelevisão Portuguesa (RTP), organised a two-stage national final in order to select its entry for the contest. The first stage titled Selecção Nacional resulted in eight artists that competed in the second stage, Festival RTP da Canção 1995, which took place on 7 March 1995 where "Baunilha e chocolate" performed by Tó Cruz emerged as the winner following the combination of votes from 22 regional juries and a public televote.

The song competed in the Eurovision Song Contest which took place on 13 May 1995. Performing during the show in position 16, it placed twenty-first out of the 23 participating songs from different countries, scoring 5 points.

== Background ==
Prior to the 1995 contest, Radiotelevisão Portuguesa (RTP) had participated in the Eurovision Song Contest representing Portugal thirty times since its first entry in 1964. Its highest placing in the contest was seventh, which they achieved on two occasions: in 1972 with the song "A festa da vida" performed by Carlos Mendes and in 1980 with the song "Um grande, grande amor" performed by José Cid. Its least successful result has been last place, which they have achieved on two occasions, most recently in 1974 with the song "E depois do adeus" performed by Paulo de Carvalho. The Portuguese entry has also received nul points once, in 1964 with the song "Oração" performed by António Calvário.

RTP has traditionally selected its entry for the Eurovision Song Contest via the music competition Festival da Canção, with an exception in 1988 when it selected its entry internally. The broadcaster organized Festival RTP da Canção 1995 in order to select the 1995 Portuguese entry.

== Before Eurovision ==
=== Selecção Nacional ===
Selecção Nacional was the first phase of selecting the Portuguese entry for the Eurovision Song Contest 1995. 36 artists, selected from 800 applications, competed in the competition which took place in 1994. Six semi-finals featuring six artists each were held from which the votes of a jury panel consisting of João Maria Tudela, Miguel Ângelo and Nucha selected the winner to advance to Festival RTP da Canção 1995 from each show. Due to all semi-finals having a tie for first place between two and three artists, an additional Second Chance round featuring the seven artists that lost the tie-break was held from which an additional two acts advanced to Festival RTP da Canção 1995. All shows of the competition were hosted by Sofia Morais, Herman José and former Eurovision Song Contest entrant Carlos Mendes, who represented Portugal in the 1968 and in the 1972 contests, and were broadcast on RTP1 and RTP Internacional.

Semi-final 1
Artist	Song	Points	Place
Carla Saramago	"Memórias de um beijo"	23	6
Cristina Castro Pereira	"A paixão"	28	2
Dina Ricardo	"Adeus"	27	3
Ed Sant'ana	"Jardins proibidos"	26	5
Filipa Campiã	"Indios da meia praia"	28	1
Rui Silva	"Cartas de amor"	27	3

Semi-final 2
Artist	Song	Points	Place
Ema and Isabel Viana	"Estrada do monte"	30	2
Helena Neves	"Sete mares"	28	3
João Queirós	"Cantigas do Maio"	25	5
Maria Enes	"Chamateia"	30	1
Paulo Caetano	"Estrela da minha vida"	23	6
Sandra Soares	"Foi Deus"	26	4

Semi-final 3
Artist	Song	Points	Place
Ana Isabel	"Feiticeira"	30	1
Francisco Taveira	"Adeus tristeza"	27	5
Nuno Jorge	"Vim de longe"	30	2
Sofia Froes	"Verdes são os campos"	24	6
Sofia Marques	"Com um brilhozinho nos olhos"	28	4
Teresa Brito	"Põe os teus braços à volta de mim"	30	2

Semi-final 4
Artist	Song	Points	Place
Catarina Burnay	"Queda do império"	29	3
Hugo	"Deixa-me rir"	26	5
Pedro Miguéis	"O pastor"	30	1
Tó Cruz	"Porto sentido"	30	2
Vanessa Campos	"Tudo isto é fado"	26	5
Vânia Maroti	"Vocês sabem lá"	28	3

Semi-final 5
Artist	Song	Points	Place
Ana Sofia	"Amar"	30	1
Guarani Girão	"Noite"	26	5
Maria de Deus	"Maio maduro maio"	30	2
Marisa Moura	"Anzol"	26	5
Miguel P.T.	"Perdidamente"	29	3
Nuno Simão	"Estou além"	28	4

Semi-final 6
Artist	Song	Points	Place
Carlos Sousa	"Nostalgia"	23	6
Dulce	"Teus olhos castanhos"	25	4
Goreti Lima	"Chamar a música"	30	2
Mário Sereno	"Caprichos da lua"	30	1
Nádia Palma	"Trolha da areosa"	24	5
Susana Félix	"Sol de inverno"	30	2

Second Chance
Artist	Points	Place
Ema and Isabel Viana	12	3
Goreti Lima	9	6
Maria de Deus	12	3
Nuno Jorge	12	3
Susana Félix	9	6
Teresa Brito	12	2
Tó Cruz	15	1

=== Festival RTP da Canção 1995 ===
Festival RTP da Canção 1995, the 32nd edition of Festival da Canção, was the second phase of selecting the Portuguese entry for the Eurovision Song Contest 1995. The competition took place at the Cinema Tivoli in Lisbon on 7 March 1995, hosted by Sofia Morais, Herman José and former Eurovision Song Contest entrant Carlos Mendes, and broadcast on RTP1 and RTP Internacional. The eight artists that qualified from Selecção Nacional each performed one song created for them by composers invited by RTP for the competition and the winner, "Baunilha e chocolate" performed by Tó Cruz, was selected based on the combination of votes of 22 regional juries and a public televote which acted as a 23rd jury. In addition to the performances of the competing entries, TetVocal performed as the interval act.

Final – 7 March 1995
R/O	Artist	Song	Songwriter(s)	Points	Place
1	Filipa Campeã	"Tiriri"	Luís Portugal, Rui Amado	81	8
2	Maria Enes	"Atlântica"	Fernando Cunha, Miguel Ângelo	82	7
3	Ana Isabel	"Tanto amor tanto mar"	João Carlos Oliveira	135	2
4	Pedro Miguéis	"Ainda é tempo"	Jan van Dijck, Nuno Gomes dos Santos	119	4
5	Ana Sofia	"Travo doce"	Nuno Feist	97	5
6	Mário Sereno	"Vem um tempo"	Luís Fernando, Paulo Gonzo, Pedro Malaquias	93	6
7	Tó Cruz	"Baunilha e chocolate"	António Victorino d'Almeida, Rosa Lobato de Faria	158	1
8	Teresa Brito	"Plural"	José Cid	132	3

Detailed Voting Results
R/O	Song	Angra do Heroísmo	Aveiro	Beja	Braga	Bragança	Castelo Branco	Coimbra	Évora	Faro	Funchal	Guarda	Horta	Leiria	Lisbon	Ponta Delgada	Portalegre	Porto	Santarém	Setúbal	Viana do Castelo	Vila Real	Viseu	Televote	Total
1	"Tiriri"	1	2	3	1	2	4	6	5	1	5	8	1	3	1	2	3	6	1	6	6	10	3	1	81
2	"Atlântica"	10	1	4	6	8	1	2	1	2	4	4	8	5	2	3	1	3	2	2	2	1	8	2	82
3	"Tanto amor tanto mar"	6	6	5	10	4	5	4	6	10	8	10	4	6	4	5	2	8	3	3	10	8	5	3	135
4	"Ainda é tempo"	5	4	6	3	3	10	5	8	8	2	2	5	8	8	6	5	1	6	4	1	5	4	10	119
5	"Travo doce"	2	5	10	5	5	2	1	4	4	1	5	3	4	5	8	4	2	4	1	4	2	10	6	97
6	"Vem um tempo"	4	3	1	2	6	8	3	2	6	6	1	2	2	6	1	6	5	5	10	5	3	1	5	93
7	"Baunilha e chocolate"	8	8	2	4	1	6	10	3	3	10	3	10	10	10	10	8	10	10	8	8	6	2	8	158
8	"Plural"	3	10	8	8	10	3	8	10	5	3	6	6	1	3	4	10	4	8	5	3	4	6	4	132

== At Eurovision ==
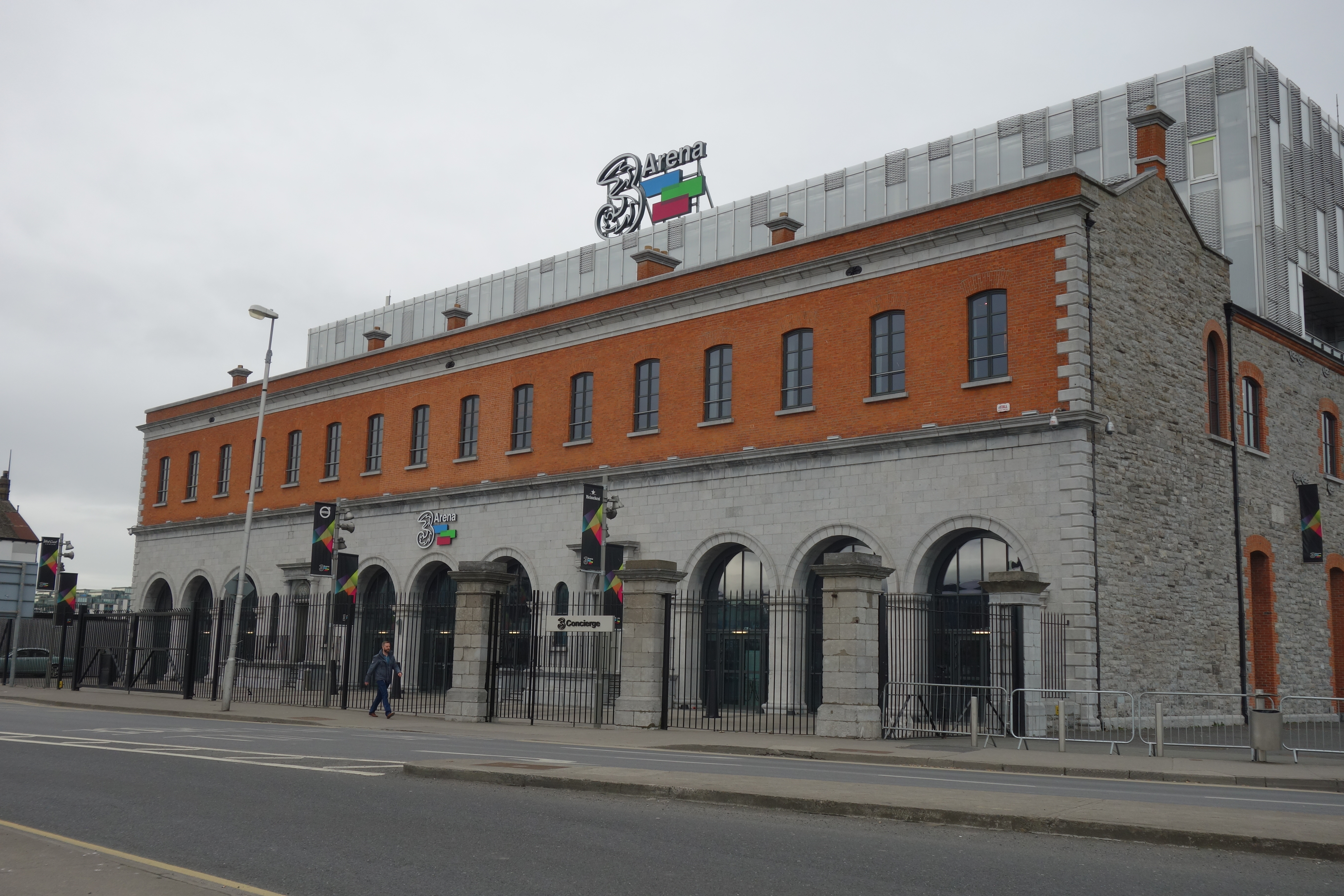
The Eurovision Song Contest 1995 took place at the Point Theatre in Dublin, Ireland, on 13 May 1995.

According to Eurovision rules, all nations with the exceptions of the seven countries which had obtained the lowest average number of points over the last five contests competed in the final on 13 May 1995. Portugal was one of the top sixteen countries in the 1994 contest and thus was permitted to participate. On 9 December 1994, an allocation draw was held which determined the running order and Portugal was set to perform in position 16, following the entry from the United Kingdom and before the entry from Cyprus. The Portuguese conductor at the contest was Thilo Krasmann and Portugal finished in twenty-first place with 5 points.

The contest was broadcast on RTP1 and RTP Internacional, with commentary by Ana do Carmo. RTP appointed Serenella Andrade as its spokesperson to announce the Portuguese jury's votes.

=== Voting ===
Below is a breakdown of points awarded to Portugal and awarded by Portugal in the contest. The nation awarded its 12 points to Norway in the contest.

Points awarded to Portugal
Score	Country
12 points	
10 points	
8 points	
7 points	
6 points	
5 points	
4 points	France
3 points	
2 points	
1 point	Greece

Points awarded by Portugal
Score	Country
12 points	Norway
10 points	United Kingdom
8 points	Sweden
7 points	Spain
6 points	Denmark
5 points	Slovenia
4 points	Croatia
3 points	Greece
2 points	Austria
1 point	Poland
