= Se på mig =

1995 song by Jan Johansen

Single by Jan Johansen
- Language: Swedish
- Released: 1995
- Composers: Håkan Almqvist; Bobby Ljunggren
- Lyricist: Ingela Forsman

Eurovision Song Contest 1995 entry
- Country: Sweden
- Artist: Jan Johansen
- Language: Swedish
- Composers: Håkan Almqvist; Bobby Ljunggren
- Lyricist: Ingela Forsman
- Conductor: Anders Berglund

Finals performance
- Final result: 3rd
- Final points: 100

Entry chronology
- ◄ "Stjärnorna" (1994)
- "Den vilda" (1996) ►

"Se på mig" (literally translating into "Look at Me"; an English version is titled "Another Night") is a song by Swedish singer Jan Johansen. It represented Sweden in the Eurovision Song Contest 1995, using the colloquial spelling "Se på mej".

It was the 18th song that was performed on the night, following Cyprus' Alexandros Panayi with "Sti Fotia" and preceding Denmark's Aud Wilken with "Fra Mols til Skagen". At the close of the voting, it had received 100 points, ultimately finishing 3rd out of a possible 23. It was succeeded as Swedish representative at the 1996 contest by One More Time with "Den vilda".

The song peaked on the Swedish Sverigetopplistan singles chart at #1 twice. On 21 April 1995 it reached No. 1 on the charts, staying there for five weeks and then returned to #1 on 9 June 1995 for another four weeks.

== Critical reception ==
Pan-European magazine Music & Media wrote, "The number 3 at the Eurovision Song Contest in Dublin proves to be a man of endurance, as radio is steadily picking up his AOR ballad, which has a synth line a la Brucie's Philadelphia."

== Charts ==
=== Weekly charts ===
Chart (1995)	Peak position
Europe (Eurochart Hot 100)	40
Norway (VG-lista)	7
Sweden (Sverigetopplistan)	1

=== Year-end charts ===
Chart (1995)	Position
Sweden (Sverigetopplistan)	2

Preceded by "Stjärnorna" by Marie Bergman and Roger Pontare	Melodifestivalen winners 1995	Succeeded by "Den vilda" by One More Time
