= Ireland in the Eurovision Song Contest 1995 =

- Eurovision Song Contest 1995
- Participating broadcaster: Radio Telefís Éireann (RTÉ)
- Country: Ireland
- Selection process: Eurosong '95
- Selection date: 12 March 1995

Competing entry
- Song: "Dreamin'"
- Artist: Eddie Friel
- Songwriters: Richard Abbott; Barry Woods

Placement
- Final result: 14th, 44 points

Participation chronology

Ireland was represented at the Eurovision Song Contest 1995 with the song "Dreamin'", written by Richard Abbott and Barry Woods, and performed by Eddie Friel. The Irish participating broadcaster, Radio Telefís Éireann (RTÉ), selected its entry through a national final. In addition, RTÉ was also the host broadcaster for the third year in a row, and staged the event at the Point Theatre in Dublin for the second time in a row, after winning the previous edition with the song "Rock 'n' Roll Kids" by Paul Harrington and Charlie McGettigan.

== Before Eurovision ==
=== Eurosong '95 ===
Radio Telefís Éireann (RTÉ) held Eurosong '95 on 12 March 1995 at the Cork Opera House in Cork. For the fifth year running, Pat Kenny hosted the event. The eight songs presented were voted on by ten regional juries.

R/O	Performer	Song	Points	Place
1	Eddie Friel	"Dreamin'"	99	1
2	Mary Farrell	"The Night Time"	66	6
3	Annette Griffin	"Ó Am go hAm"	68	5
4	Henry Winter	"Now That Love Has Brought You Back Again"	37	7
5	Joan Connolly	"Rainy Day"	33	8
6	Carl Corcoran	"Little by Little"	73	4
7	Maggie Toal	"Come Back and Hold Me"	82	3
8	Naoimh Penston	"Always You"	92	2

Detailed Regional Jury Votes
R/O	Song	Athlone	Buncrana	Castlebar	Cork	Dublin	Dundalk	Galway	Kilkenny	Limerick	Waterford	Total
1	"Dreamin'"	12	5	7	12	12	10	12	10	12	7	99
2	"The Night Time"	8	7	5	7	5	5	10	6	7	6	66
3	"Ó Am go hAm"	10	6	10	5	8	8	6	5	5	5	68
4	"Now That Love Has Brought You Back Again"	4	4	4	4	3	3	4	3	4	4	37
5	"Rainy Day"	3	3	3	3	4	4	3	4	3	3	33
6	"Little by Little"	5	8	12	8	7	7	5	7	6	8	73
7	"Come Back and Hold Me"	6	10	6	6	6	12	8	8	10	10	82
8	"Always You"	7	12	8	10	10	6	7	12	8	12	92

Following its victory, the winning song "Dreamin'" caused some controversy following plagiarism allegations due to similarities to a Julie Felix song called "Moonlight", released in 1971. The second-placed song in the national final, "Always You", was for a while considered as a potential replacement for Friel, however an agreement with Felix allowed the song to continue in the contest.

== At Eurovision ==
"Dreamin'" was performed in second position on the night, after Poland and before Germany, and went on to take 14th place in the contest with 44 points, breaking Ireland's record three-year-long winning streak.

The contest was broadcast on RTÉ 1 (with commentary by Pat Kenny) and on radio station RTÉ Radio 1 (with commentary by Larry Gogan).

=== Voting ===
Points awarded to Ireland
Score	Country
12 points	
10 points	Sweden
8 points	
7 points	
6 points	
5 points	Bosnia and Herzegovina; Russia; Slovenia; Turkey
4 points	Greece
3 points	Iceland; Spain
2 points	
1 point	Denmark; France; Germany; Norway

Points awarded by Ireland
Score	Country
12 points	Sweden
10 points	Norway
8 points	Slovenia
7 points	Denmark
6 points	Iceland
5 points	France
4 points	Malta
3 points	Croatia
2 points	Spain
1 point	United Kingdom
