= Bosnia and Herzegovina in the Eurovision Song Contest 1995 =

- Eurovision Song Contest 1995
- Participating broadcaster: Radiotelevision of Bosnia-Herzegovina (RTVBiH)
- Country: Bosnia and Herzegovina
- Selection process: Artist: Internal selection Song: BH Eurovision Song Contest 95
- Selection date: 8 March 1995

Competing entry
- Song: "Dvadeset prvi vijek"
- Artist: Davorin Popović
- Songwriters: Sinan Alimanović; Zlatan Fazlić

Placement
- Final result: 19th, 14 points

Participation chronology

Bosnia and Herzegovina was represented at the Eurovision Song Contest 1995 with the song "Dvadeset prvi vijek", written by Sinan Alimanović and Zlatan Fazlić, and performed by Davorin Popović. The Bosnian-Herzegovinian participating broadcaster, Radiotelevision of Bosnia-Herzegovina (RTVBiH), selected its entry for the contest through a national final, after having previously selected the performer internally. They finished on 19th place out of 23 countries with 14 points.

== Before Eurovision ==
=== BH Eurovision Song Contest 95 ===
Radiotelevision of Bosnia-Herzegovina (RTVBiH) held the national final on 8 March 1995 at its television studios in Sarajevo, hosted by Ismeta Dervoz. Davorin Popović sang all the songs and the winner was chosen by a jury. Initially there was a tie between "Dvadeset i prvi vijek" and "Bez tebe" so the jury had to vote again between these two songs, with "Dvadeset i prvi vijek" eventually being declared the winner.

Davorin Popović had already been selected internally to represent the country. Eight songs were performed by Popović, and the winner was chosen by an expert jury.

“Dvadeset i prvi vijek”, composed by Zlatan Fazlić and arranged by Sinan Alimanović, eventually won.

Final – 8 March 1995
R/O	Song	Composer	Lyricist	Place
1	"Čuvaj se"	Sandy Lopičić	Zlatan Fazlić	—
2	"Dvadeset i prvi vijek"	Zlatan Fazlić		1
3	"Raduj se"	Fadil Redžić	Maja Perfiljeva	7
4	"Ti si osmo svjetsko čudo"	Zlatan Fazlić		8
5	"Opila me jedna jesen"	Fadil Redžić	Maja Perfiljeva	—
6	"Bez tebe"	Zlatan Fazlić		2
7	"Još samo ovaj put"	Sandy Lopičić	Nataša Mirković	—
8	"Ti si ruža"	Adi Mulahalilović	Edo Mulahalilović	—

== At Eurovision ==
Davorin Popović performed 4th on the night of the contest, following Germany and preceding eventual winners Norway. At the close of voting Bosnia and Herzegovina received 14 points, placing 19th of the 23 competing countries. The Bosnian jury awarded its 12 points to Malta.

The contest was broadcast on TVBiH.

=== Voting ===
Points awarded to Bosnia and Herzegovina
Score	Country
12 points	
10 points	
8 points	Croatia
7 points	
6 points	
5 points	
4 points	
3 points	Denmark; Turkey
2 points	
1 point	

Points awarded by Bosnia and Herzegovina
Score	Country
12 points	Malta
10 points	Croatia
8 points	Spain
7 points	Israel
6 points	Slovenia
5 points	Ireland
4 points	United Kingdom
3 points	Denmark
2 points	Sweden
1 point	Norway
