= Arzu Ece =

Turkish singer (born 1963)

- Born: Arzu Özkaraman; 22 September 1963 (age 62)
- Origin: Istanbul, Turkey
- Genres: Pop, schlager
- Occupation: Singer

Arzu Ece (born Arzu Özkaraman; 22 September 1963) is a Turkish singer, best known for her participation in the Eurovision Song Contests of 1989 and 1995.

== Eurovision Song Contest ==
Ece made five appearances in the Turkish Eurovision Song Contest selection as follows:

- 1987: "Keloğlan" (with Rüya Ersavci, Fatih Erkoç & Harun Kolçak ) – No placement as only two of the 10 participating songs received jury votes
- 1988: "Zig Zag" (with Cigdem Tunc) – Placements not released
- 1989: "Bana Bana" (as member of Pan) – 1st
- 1991: "Sessiz geceler" (with Gür Akad) – 2nd
- 1995: "Sev" – 1st

Following her victory with Pan in 1989, Ece went forward to the 34th Eurovision Song Contest, held in Lausanne, Switzerland on 6 May. "Bana Bana" was a very ethnic-sounding song but it came many years before such songs became vote winners at Eurovision, and finished in 21st place of the 22 entries, beating only the 'nul points' Icelandic entry.

Ece's appearance, with the more mainstream ballad "Sev", at the 40th Eurovision Song Contest in Dublin on 13 May 1995 resulted in a slightly better placement – 16th out of 23. She released her second album, Sebebi yok, in 1994, then retired from the music industry.

== Post-Eurovision ==
In her hopeful war against cancer, she came back to the agenda back in 2012 with her song "Kemo Ağa".

None of her Eurovision songs were major hits in Turkey, Germany or elsewhere in the Turkish diaspora.

== Personal life ==
Ece married Ali Otyam in 1999; the couple had a son but divorced in 2007. Ece was diagnosed with leukemia in 2009, and underwent treatment, including chemotherapy.

== Discography ==
- Bir Daha & Sen Yok musun (45 rpm/Hop Plak) (1976)
- Çapkın Çocuk & Dün Bugün Yarın (45 rpm/Yankı Plak) (1976)
- Beni Sen Çağırdın (MC/Lider Plak) (1985)
- Sebebi Yok (MC, CD/Türküola) (1994)
- Sev, Love, Aime (MC, CD/TRT) (1995)
- Master Chemo — Kemo Aga (Single) (2012)

Awards and achievements
Preceded by Burak Aydos with "Esmer Yarim"	Turkey in the Eurovision Song Contest; 1995	Succeeded by Şebnem Paker with "Beşinci Mevsim"
