= Russia in the Eurovision Song Contest 1995 =

- Eurovision Song Contest 1995
- Country: Russia
- Selection process: Internal selection

Competing entry
- Song: "Kolybelnaya dlya vulkana"
- Artist: Philipp Kirkorov
- Songwriters: Ilya Bershadskiy; Ilya Resnik

Placement
- Final result: 17th, 17 points

Participation chronology

Russia was represented at the Eurovision Song Contest 1995 with the song "Kolybelnaya dlya vulkana", written by Ilya Bershadskiy and Ilya Resnik, and performed by Philipp Kirkorov. The Russian broadcaster Russian Public Television (ORT) internally selected Kirkorov to represent the nation. Prior to Kirkorov's selection, ORT organised a public selection process to select the Russian entrant. While the event did take place, the jury could not decide on the winner of selection and ultimately opted to choose the artist internally.

Vocal Band were selected to represent Russia, however ORT later withdrew the band as the Russian representatives due to the members being unable to finance their participation. Kirkorov was then selected instead. Russia was drawn to appear sixth in the final, which was held on 13 May. In the final, the nation placed 17th with 17 points, marking the nation's worst placement in the contest to this point.

== Background ==
The 1995 contest marked Russia's second participation following its 1994 debut entry "Vechny strannik" performed by Youddiph, which placed 9th. Typically the Russian participation in the contest alternates between two national broadcasters: Russian Public Television (ORT) and Russian Television and Radio (RTR). The broadcaster for the 1995 contest was ORT, which broadcast the event in Russia and organised the selection process for its entry. Prior to the Eurovision, ORT held a national final to choose the artist and song; however, it later opted to abandon the process and instead select its 1995 entry internally, as the national final's jury was unable to select a winner.

== Before Eurovision ==
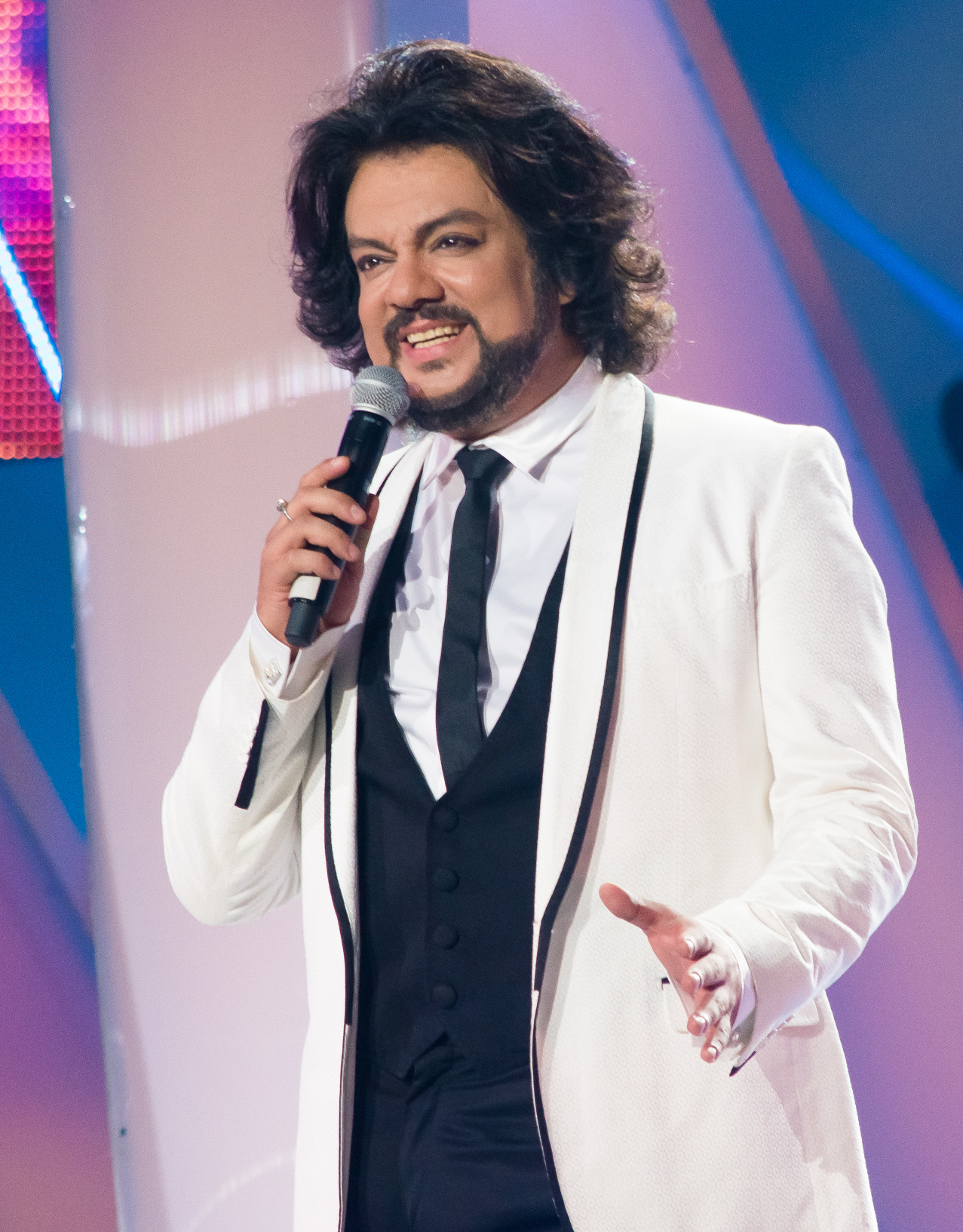
Philipp Kirkorov (pictured in 2015) was selected to represent Russia in the Eurovision Song Contest 1995

=== Evrovidenie "Pesnya-95" ===
Evrovidenie "Pesnya-95" was the national final format developed by ORT in order to select Russia's entry for the Eurovision Song Contest 1995. The competition was aired on 30 April 1995 on ORT. Eight songs competed and the winner was set to be selected by the votes of an expert jury panel. In the end, the jury came to the conclusion that none of the participants deserves to represent Russia and therefore final ended without a winner.

Final – 30 April 1995
Draw	Artist	Song	Votes	Place
1	Vasily Bogatyrev	"Portret" (Портрет)	0%	3
2	Diana Shagaeva	"Zvezda" (Звезда)	0%	3
3	Inesh Kdyrova	"Ya vizhu solntse" (Я вижу солнце)	0%	3
4	Olga Dzusova	"Maska" (Маска)	0%	3
5	Aleksey Moldaliev	"Dlya tebya" (Для тебя)	0%	3
6	Oksana Pavlovskaya	"V sinem sne" (В синем сне)	50%	1
7	Viktoria Vita	"Epitafiya" (Эпитафия)	50%	1
8	Natalia Shturm	"Monetka" (Монетка)	0%	3

According to Olga Dzusova— who was among the participants, following the close of the national selection, the European Broadcasting Union sent ORT a letter proposing them to send either Oksana Pavlovskaya, Viktoria Vita, or Dzusova herself. However, ORT allegedly disposed of the letter and proceeded to internally select their act instead.

=== Internal selection ===
After the jury could not decide on the winner, it was decided to conduct an internal selection. Vocal Band were selected to represent Russia, however, ORT later withdrew the band due to the members' inability to finance their participation and instead selected Philipp Kirkorov as the nation's representative. His contest song, "Kolybelnaya dlya vulkana" was written by Ilya Reznik and Ilya Bershadskiy. It was later discovered that this song itself was originally released by Anastasia Lazariuc under the title "Buna Seara Stelelor" in 1985.

== At Eurovision ==
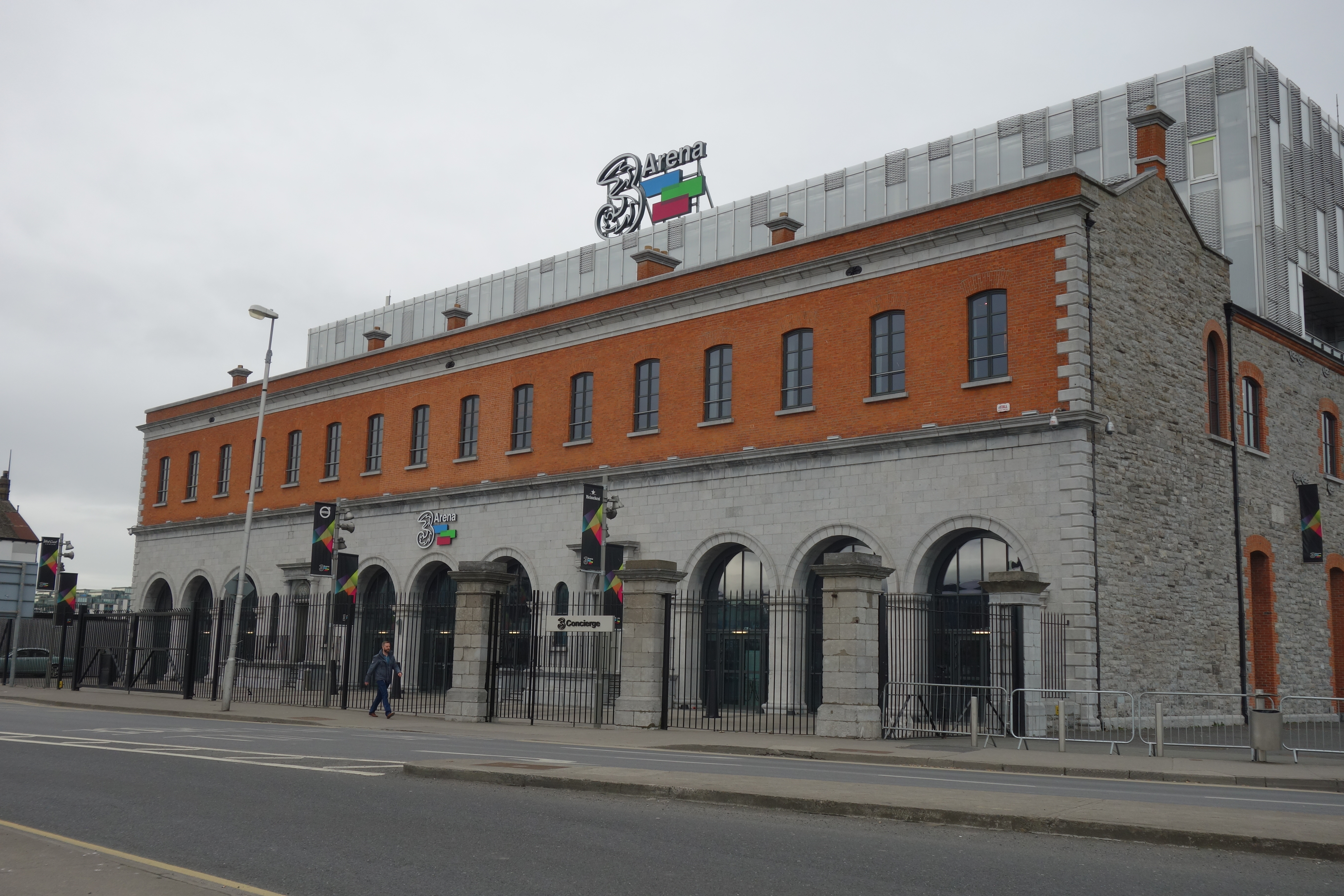
Eurovision Song Contest 1995 took place at the Point Theatre in Dublin, Ireland, on 13 May 1995.

The Eurovision Song Contest 1995 took place at the Point Theatre in Dublin, Ireland, on 13 May 1995. According to the Eurovision rules, the 23-country participant list for the contest was composed of: the winning country from the previous year's contest and host country Ireland, highest placed 17 countries, other than the previous year's winner, from the previous year's contest, five countries which were relegated from the participation in the 1994 contest and any eligible countries who didn't participate in this contest. As Russia was one of the highest placed 17 countries in the 1994 contest, it was thus permitted to participate. The running order for the contest was decided by a draw held on 9 December 1994; Russia was assigned to perform 6th at the 1995 contest, following Norway and preceding Iceland. The contest was televised in Russia on ORT, without the voting sequence on 15 May 1995 and on Radio 101, both with commentary by Olesya Trifonova.

Kirkorov took part in technical rehearsals on 8 and 10 May 1995, followed by three dress rehearsals held in the afternoon and evening of 12 May and the afternoon of 13 May. The Russian performance featured Kirkorov on stage wearing a white shirt and black trousers, joined by internal selection participants Vocal Band as backing vocalists. After the voting concluded, Russia scored 17 points and placed 17th. At the time this result was Russia's worst placing in its competitive history. The Russian conductor at the contest was Mikhail Finberg. Following the contest, ORT implied that Russia had emerged as the winner; Eurovision Song Contest historian John Kennedy O'Connor stated in his book The Eurovision Song Contest: The Official History that Kirkorov's performance was shown last and none of the voting was shown in order to give this impression. Giacomo Natali stated in his book Capire l'Eurovision that ORT "[moved] his performance to the end and removed voting and results: that night, the audience from home saw the connection end with ovation of the audience for the Russian singer".

=== Voting ===
The same voting system in use since 1975 was again implemented for the Eurovision Song Contest 1995, with each country providing 1–8, 10 and 12 points to the 10 highest-ranking songs as determined by a jury panel, with countries not allowed to vote for themselves. Russia assembled a 16-member jury panel, consisting of Yury Saulsky, Igor Krutoy, Marina Khlebnikova, Lora Kvint, Andrey Bill, Natalia Shemankova, Ninel Yakovenko, Roman Karasev, Konstantin Smertin, Andrey Boltenko, Vladimir Polupanov, Irina Bogushevskaya, Ekaterina Alekseeva and three unnamed representatives of the public, to determine which countries would receive their points. Below is a breakdown of points awarded to Russia and awarded by Russia in the contest. The nation awarded its 12 points to Norway in the contest.

Points awarded to Russia
Score	Country
12 points	
10 points	Norway
8 points	
7 points	
6 points	Croatia
5 points	
4 points	
3 points	
2 points	
1 point	Cyprus

Points awarded by Russia
Score	Country
12 points	Norway
10 points	Denmark
8 points	Israel
7 points	Slovenia
6 points	Sweden
5 points	Ireland
4 points	Cyprus
3 points	Iceland
2 points	Hungary
1 point	United Kingdom
