= Turkey in the Eurovision Song Contest 1995 =

- Eurovision Song Contest 1995
- Participating broadcaster: Turkish Radio and Television Corporation (TRT)
- Country: Turkey
- Selection process: 18. Eurovision Şarkı Yarışması Türkiye Finali
- Selection date: 18 March 1995

Competing entry
- Song: "Sev"
- Artist: Arzu Ece
- Songwriters: Melih Kibar; Zeynep Talu Kurşuncu

Placement
- Final result: 16th, 21 points

Participation chronology

Turkey was represented at the Eurovision Song Contest 1995 with the song "Sev", composed by Melih Kibar, with lyrics by Zeynep Talu, and performed by Arzu Ece. The Turkish participating broadcaster, the Turkish Radio and Television Corporation (TRT), selected its entry through a national final.

== Before Eurovision ==
=== 18. Eurovision Şarkı Yarışması Türkiye Finali ===
The Turkish Radio and Television Corporation (TRT) held the national final on 18 March 1995 at its studios in Ankara, hosted by Yesmin Ertuğrul and Bülend Özveren. Ten songs competed and the winner was determined by an expert jury.

Although the original singer of "Sev" was Yeşim Dönüş Işın, Arzu Ece took the place of Yeşim on the advice of the jury.

Final – 18 March 1995
R/O	Artist	Song	Lyricist	Composer	Place
1	Fatih Erkoç	"Duygular"	Fatih Erkoç	Fatih Erkoç	9
2	Elif Ersoy	"Bana Şans Dile"	Zeynep Talu	Garo Mafyan	6
3	Grup Met	"Duysun Şarkılar"	Nezih Topuzlu	Selmi Andak	3
4	Arzu Ece & Fatih Erkoç	"Sevda"	Aysel Gürel	Uğur Başar	4
5	Diler Türkmen	"Aşkımla Oynama"	Eda Özülkü	Metin Özülkü	8
6	Arzu Ece	"Sev"	Zeynep Talu	Melih Kibar	1
7	Toygarhan Atuner	"Çöl Güneşi"	Ercan Saatçi	Aykut Gürel	5
8	Serpil Barlas & Orient Ekspres	"2001"	Selma Çuhacı	Uğur Dikmen	2
9	Berna Keser	"Rüzgarlar Vedaya Karşı"	Mustafa Sandal	Mustafa Sandal	10
10	Suavi	"Önce Sen Vardın"	Suavi Saygan	Müfit Bayraşa	7

== At Eurovision ==
On the night of the contest Arzu Ece performed 10th in the running order following Spain and preceding Croatia. At the close of the voting, the song had received 21 points, placing Turkey 16th. Seven participants had voted for "Sev." The Turkish jury awarded its 12 points to Norway.

The contest was broadcast on TRT 1.

=== Voting ===
Points awarded to Turkey
Score	Country
12 points	
10 points	
8 points	
7 points	Malta
6 points	
5 points	Croatia
4 points	
3 points	Slovenia
2 points	Spain; United Kingdom
1 point	Belgium; Israel

Points awarded by Turkey
Score	Country
12 points	Norway
10 points	Malta
8 points	Spain
7 points	Croatia
6 points	Denmark
5 points	Ireland
4 points	Austria
3 points	Bosnia and Herzegovina
2 points	France
1 point	Sweden
