= Stella Jones (singer) =

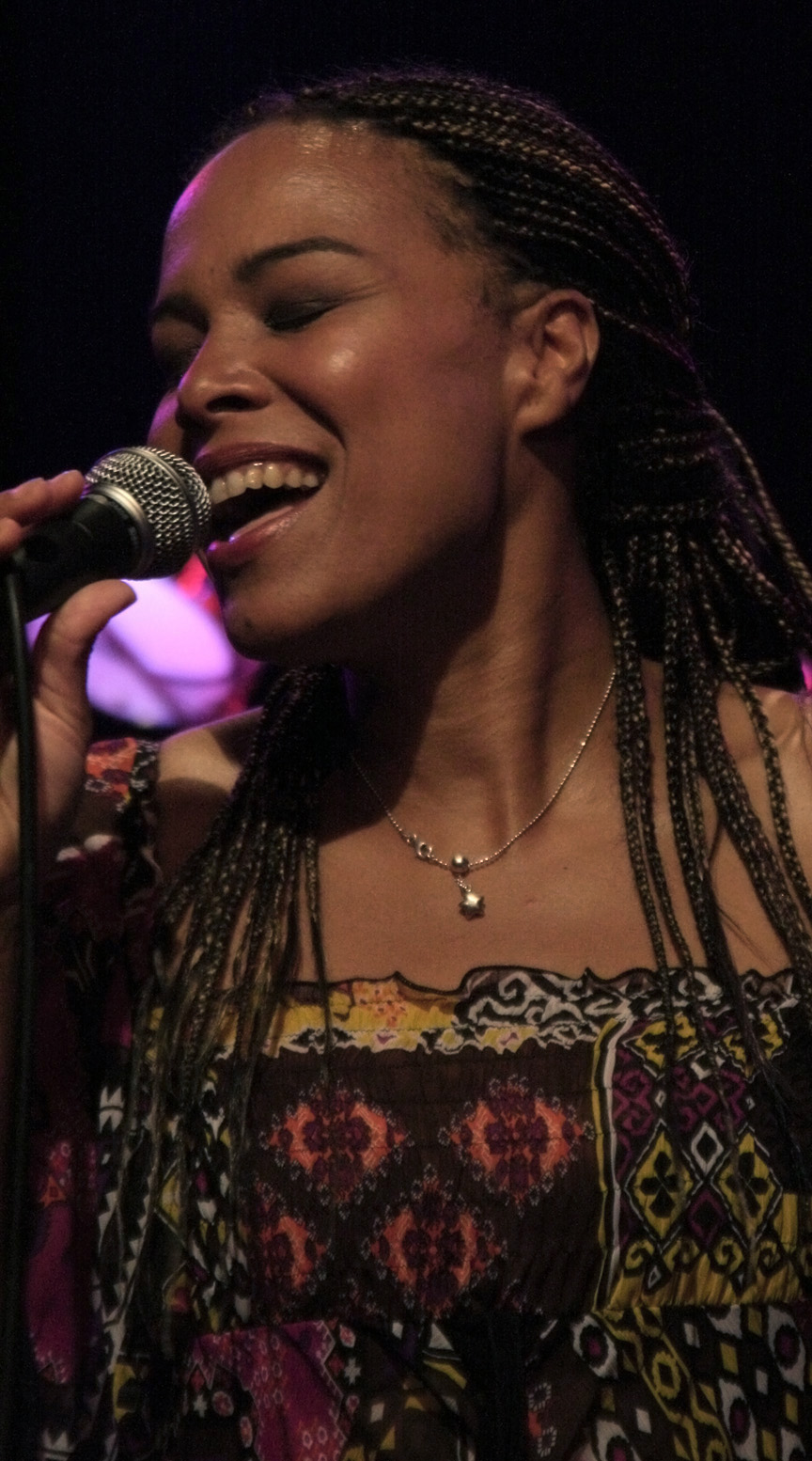

Background information
- Also known as: Stella Jones
- Born: Stellisa Zacher; 1971 (age 54–55); Berlin
- Genres: Soul; Jazz
- Instrument: Vocals
- Years active: 1992–present
- Website: www.stellajones.info

Stella Jones (born as Stellisa Zacher in 1971), is a soul and jazz singer, pianist, arranger and composer.

== Life and career ==
Stella Jones was born in what was then West Berlin to Blues singer and Fluxus artist Christine Jones and Bebop trumpeter Carmell Jones. She grew up in an environment that included numerous international artists. She began playing the piano herself at the age of five.

In 1977, she came to Vienna, where she began her musical career, performing in jazz clubs alongside her mother. She still lives there today. After initial experience in stage productions such as The Rocky Horror Show, she landed roles in musicals such as Mozartmania, Rent, Ain't Misbehavin', and Little Shop of Horrors. In 1992, Jones had her first number one song in the Ö3 Austria Top 40 with the band Powerpack, "Birthday Song".

In 1995 she represented Austria with "Die Welt dreht sich verkehrt" (composed by Mischa Krausz) at the Eurovision Song Contest in Dublin, where she reached 13th place. In the same year she released her first album under her own name (Thunder). This was followed by engagements with Taylor Dayne, Gloria Gaynor, Omara Portuondo, Chaka Khan and Nina Hagen, as well as with Austrian bands ( Count Basic, Monti Beton, Alkbottle, Bingoboys, Hot Pants Road Club, Vienna Symphonic Orchestra Project and others) and musicians (Hans Salomon, Wolfgang Ambros, Rainhard Fendrich, Boris Bukowski and others).

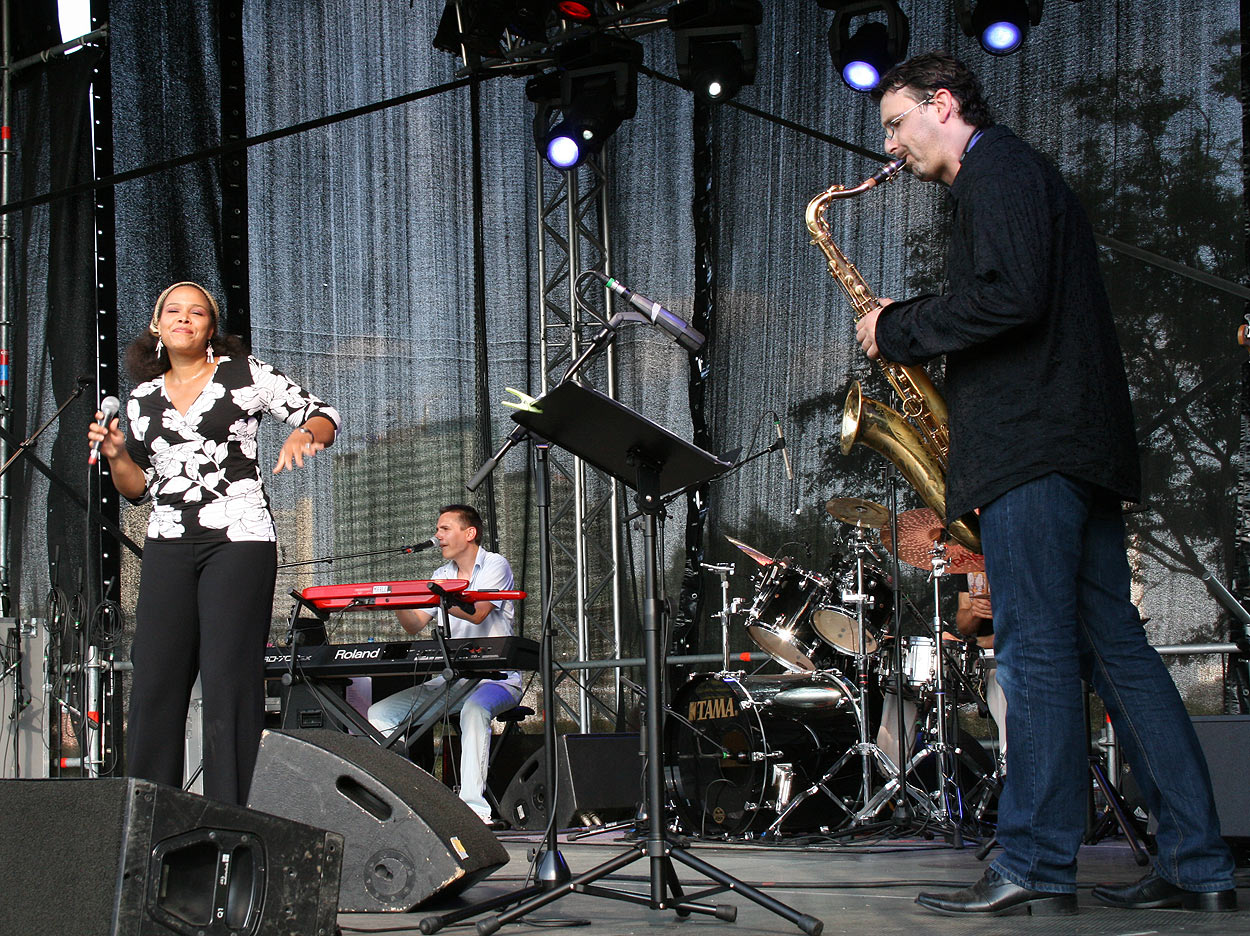
Stella Jones & Soul Project (Donauinselfest 2007)

In 2008, her album The Pursuit of Silence was released, featuring 15 original compositions, for which she also produced. Willi Langer on bass and Thomas Lang on drums were among those involved in the recording. Stella Jones was on the Austrian jury for the Eurovision Song Contest 2014 alongside Michael Dörfler, Dietmar Lienbacher, Diana Lueger, and Alexander Kahr.

== Discography ==
Participation (selection)

- Mozartmania: Mitten ins Herz (1990)
- Alkbottle: Wir san auf kana Kinderjausn (1995)
- Andy Lee Lang: The 10th Anniversary live (1996)
- Drums on Earth: Freedom (1999)
- Christine Jones: Tarmin Bacon (2000)
- Hans Salomon: Midnight Lady (2001)
- Rainhard Fendrich: Ein Saitensprung (2004)
- Rainhard Fendrich: Auf Leben (2004)

Under her own name

- Thunder (1995)
- The Pursuit of Silence (2008)
- M.A.Y.A. – Mystic Ancient Yearning Astronaut (2012)
