= Liora (singer) =

Israeli singer

Liora Simon Fadlon
- ליאורה פדלון סימון
- Born: 1970 (age 55–56); Ashkelon, Israel
- Years active: 1989-

Liora Simon Fadlon (Hebrew: ליאורה פדלון סימון; born 1970), known mononymously as Liora, is an Israeli singer.

She became musically active during her military service (specifically in the Israeli Navy Band). Her first album was released in 1994. As the winner of the Israeli competition Kdam Eurovision she had the opportunity to represent her country at the Eurovision Song Contest 1995. With the pop anthem "Amen," she reached 8th place. Besides her success in her homeland, she also became known in South America. From 2004 to 2006, she lived in Argentina and performed as a guest singer with Mercedes Sosa and other artists of Latin American music.

She also does yoga. She lives in Omer, Israel.

== Discography ==
- Liora (1994)
- Sadness and Happiness (1996)
- Love is Godly (1999)
- My Country, My Homeland (2001)
- Donne Ta Lumiere (2004)
- Everything Changes (2008)
