= Bo Diddley (Arvingarna song) =

Single by Arvingarna

from the album För alltid
- A-side: "Bo Diddley"
- B-side: "Drömmen om Hollywood"
- Released: 1995
- Genre: dansband pop
- Label: Big Bag
- Songwriters: Lasse Holm; Gert Lengstrand

Bo Diddley is a song written by Lasse Holm and Gert Lengstrand, and performed by Arvingarna at Melodifestivalen 1995, who ended up placing sixth in the competition.

At the Swedish singles chart, it peaked at number 21. The song also charted at Svensktoppen for 12 weeks between 18 March-3 June 1995, peaking at number two.

== Charts ==
Chart (1995)	Peak position
Sweden (Sverigetopplistan)	21
