= Croatia in the Eurovision Song Contest 1995 =

- Eurovision Song Contest 1995
- Participating broadcaster: Croatian Radiotelevision (HRT)
- Country: Croatia
- Selection process: Dora 1995
- Selection date: 12 March 1995

Competing entry
- Song: "Nostalgija"
- Artist: Magazin and Lidija
- Songwriters: Tonči Huljić; Vjekoslava Huljić

Placement
- Final result: 6th, 91 points

Participation chronology

Croatia was represented at the Eurovision Song Contest 1995 with the song "Nostalgija", composed by Tonči Huljić, with lyrics by Vjekoslava Huljić, and performed by Magazin and Lidija. The Croatian participating broadcaster, Croatian Radiotelevision (HRT), selected its entry for the contest through Dora 1995.

== Before Eurovision ==
=== Dora 1995 ===
Croatian Radiotelevision (HRT) organised Dora 1995 in order to select its entry for the Eurovision Song Contest 1995. The national final, held on 12 March 1995 in Opatija, consisted of a televised final with 20 songs selected from a public call for submissions from songwriters and composers. The winner was chosen by 20 regional juries.

Final – 12 March 1995
R/O	Artist	Song	Points	Place
1	Venera	"Ova je pjesma tvoja"	1	17
2	Battifiaca	"Još vavek"	11	13
3	Mucalo	"Neka ljubav spaja nas"	0	19
4	Marinela Malić	"Mjesec je jak ko afrodizijak"	0	19
5	Ivan Mikulić	"Ti i ja"	25	11
6	Leteći odred	"Pišem ti pismo"	28	9
7	Stare staze	"Ritam ljubavi mi daj"	13	12
8	Latino	"Ne kunem ljubav"	27	10
9	Boris Novković and Moonlight Cats	"Pjesma moja to si ti"	58	6
10	Romantic	"Telefon"	2	16
11	Nina Badrić	"Odlaziš zauvijek"	1	17
12	Oliver Dragojević	"Boginja"	115	2
13	Zrinka	"Srce od zlata"	109	3
14	Bumerang	"Suzy"	3	15
15	Julija	"Babysitter"	10	14
16	Davor Radolfi	"Tvoje ime kao ime ruže"	71	5
17	Minea	"Good Boy"	36	8
18	Mira Šimić	"Oluja"	102	4
19	Srebrna krila	"Ljubav je za ljude sve"	38	7
20	Magazin and Lidija	"Nostalgija"	150	1

Detailed Regional Jury Votes
R/O	Song	Šibenik	Županja	Dubrovnik	Krapina	Pazin	Vinkovci	Bjelovar	Split	Delnice	Čakovec	Zagreb	Zadar	Slavonski Brod	Sisak	Gospić	Karlovac	Rijeka	Osijek	Varaždin	Pula	Total
1	"Ova je pjesma tvoja"															1						1
2	"Još vavek"					1		7						3								11
3	"Neka ljubav spaja nas"																					0
4	"Mjesec je jak ko afrodizijak"																					0
5	"Ti i ja"					3		5					5	5							7	25
6	"Pišem ti pismo"		10				2	1			3								12			28
7	"Ritam ljubavi mi daj"							12							1							13
8	"Ne kunem ljubav"	10							7		2				3					5		27
9	"Pjesma moja to si ti"	5	1	1	3		7			2	5	5		2	10	3	7	1	3	3		58
10	"Telefon"																2					2
11	"Odlaziš zauvijek"																		1			1
12	"Boginja"			2	10	12	5	3	12	7	10	10	12	1	5	5	12		2	2	5	115
13	"Srce od zlata"	7	5	7	5	5			1	5		3	10	10		7	5	12	5	10	12	109
14	"Suzy"		3																			3
15	"Babysitter"		2							1		7										10
16	"Tvoje ime kao ime ruže"	2		5	2	2	1		10			12	7	7	7			5	10	1		71
17	"Good Boy"			3			3		5		1	1	2			2	3	7	7		2	36
18	"Oluja"	1	7	10	12	7	10	2	3	10			3	12		12		10			3	102
19	"Ljubav je za ljude sve"	3			1					3	7	2			2		10	2		7	1	38
20	"Nostalgija"	12	12	12	7	10	12	10	2	12	12		1		12	10	1	3		12	10	150

== At Eurovision ==
Magazin & Lidija performed 11th on the night of the contest, following Turkey and preceding France. At the close of voting they had received 91 points, finishing 6th in a field of 23 competing countries. The Croatian jury awarded its 12 points to Malta.

The contest was broadcast on HRT 1, with commentary by Aleksandar Kostadinov.

=== Voting ===
Points awarded to Croatia
Score	Country
12 points	Malta; Slovenia; Spain
10 points	Bosnia and Herzegovina; Iceland
8 points	
7 points	Norway; Turkey
6 points	
5 points	Cyprus; Greece
4 points	Israel; Portugal
3 points	Ireland
2 points	
1 point	

Points awarded by Croatia
Score	Country
12 points	Malta
10 points	Spain
8 points	Bosnia and Herzegovina
7 points	Greece
6 points	Russia
5 points	Turkey
4 points	Israel
3 points	France
2 points	Slovenia
1 point	Cyprus
