= Israel in the Eurovision Song Contest 1995 =

- Eurovision Song Contest 1995
- Participating broadcaster: Israel Broadcasting Authority (IBA)
- Country: Israel
- Selection process: Kdam Eurovision 1995
- Selection date: 9 March 1995

Competing entry
- Song: "Amen"
- Artist: Liora
- Songwriters: Moshe Datz; Hamutal Ben-Ze'ev

Placement
- Final result: 8th, 81 points

Participation chronology

Israel was represented at the Eurovision Song Contest 1995 with the song "Amen", composed by Moshe Datz, with lyrics by Hamutal Ben-Ze'ev, and performed by Liora. The Israeli participating broadcaster, the Israel Broadcasting Authority (IBA), selected its entry for the contest through Kdam Eurovision 1995.

== Before Eurovision ==
=== Kdam Eurovision 1995 ===
This Israel Broadcasting Authority (IBA) held a national final to select its entry for the Eurovision Song Contest 1995, to be held in Dublin, Ireland. The broadcaster held the national final at its television studios in Jerusalem, hosted by Aki Avni and Michaela Berko. 13 songs competed, with the winner being decided through the votes of 7 regional juries. The spokesperson for Haifa's jury, Ofer Nachshon, would later go on to present Israel's votes at Eurovision between 2009 and 2017.

The winner was Liora with the song "Amen", composed by Moshe Datz and Hamutal Ben-Ze'ev.

Final – 9 March 1995
R/O	Artist	Song	Points	Place
1	Eli Luzon	"Mal'ahi hakatan"	46	4
2	Tali Koren	"Kmo Brigitte"	6	11
3	Limor Azaria-Tvito	"Kesef"	4	13
4	Lea Lupatin and Ofer Levi	"Ha'aretz hamuvtachat"	53	3
5	Si Heiman	"Batelevizya halaila"	45	5
6	Dana International	"Laila tov Eropa"	67	2
7	Haya Samir	"El hage'ula"	31	6
8	Ya'akov Nave	"Nashkini na"	5	12
9	Yulia	"Tfila"	20	8
10	Bnot Ya'akov	"Ahavat David"	27	7
11	Liora	"Amen"	82	1
12	Shalva Berti	"Halevai alecha ve'alai"	13	9
13	Avi Eylot	"Rachok mehabayit"	7	10

Detailed Regional Jury Votes
R/O	Song	Hod HaSharon	Shlomi	Tel Aviv	Haifa	Ariel	Jerusalem	Palmachim	Total
1	"Mal'ahi hakatan"	5	7	8	5	6	8	7	46
2	"Kmo Brigitte"			3	1		1	1	6
3	"Kesef"					1	3		4
4	"Ha'aretz hamuvtachat"	7	10	5	8	8	7	8	53
5	"Batelevizya halaila"	8	5	6	6	10	6	4	45
6	"Laila tov Eropa"	12	8	10	10	7	10	10	67
7	"El hage'ula"	2	2	7	7	5	2	6	31
8	"Nashkini na"		3	2					5
9	"Tfila"	3	4	1	4	2	4	2	20
10	"Ahavat David"	4	6	4	2	3	5	3	27
11	"Amen"	10	12	12	12	12	12	12	82
12	"Halevai alecha ve'alai"	1			3	4		5	13
13	"Rachok mehabayit"	6	1						7

== At Eurovision ==
Liora performed 21st on the night of the final, following Slovenia and preceding Malta. She received 81 points, placing 8th in a field of 23.

=== Voting ===
Points awarded to Israel
Score	Country
12 points	United Kingdom
10 points	Germany; Slovenia
8 points	Cyprus; Russia
7 points	Bosnia and Herzegovina
6 points	Austria
5 points	Hungary; Malta
4 points	Belgium; Croatia
3 points	
2 points	Sweden
1 point	

Points awarded by Israel
Score	Country
12 points	Spain
10 points	Norway
8 points	Greece
7 points	France
6 points	Cyprus
5 points	United Kingdom
4 points	Croatia
3 points	Slovenia
2 points	Austria
1 point	Turkey
