= Lidija Horvat-Dunjko =

Croatian opera singer

Lidija Horvat-Dunjko (born 1967) is a Croatian soprano vocalist and a Docent at the Zagreb Academy of Music. She was awarded the highest Croatian national decoration for her achievement in culture, the Order of Danica Hrvatska with the image of Marko Marulić. Her opera roles include The Queen of the Night in The Magic Flute and Gilda in Rigoletto. Along with Magazin, she finished sixth at the Eurovision Song Contest 1995, performing the song "Nostalgija", which achieved success in the country at the time.

== Career ==
Born in Varaždin, she graduated in the class of professor Zdenka Žabčić–Hesky at the University of Zagreb, where she now teaches.

She played the Queen of the Night in The Magic Flute; Marie, a vivandière in La fille du régiment; Rosina in The Barber of Seville; Gilda in Rigoletto; Blonde in Die Entführung aus dem Serail and created more than thirty successful opera roles in Croatia as well as abroad. She has performed in Paris (Théâtre des Champs-Élysées), Vienna (Musikverein), Toronto (Ryerson Theatre, Massey Hall), Berlin, Munich, Brussels, Dublin, Salzburg, Turin, Venice, Zürich, Geneva, Zagreb, Ljubljana, Buenos Aires (Teatro Colón, Teatro Nacional Cervantes), Madrid, Santiago de Chile, Lisbon, Montevideo, Moscow (Tchaikovsky Hall of the Moscow Conservatory), Johannesburg, Pretoria.

She cooperates with greatest names in opera of today as well as most eminent directors and orchestras. Horvat-Dunjko founded the Opera School of Mirula in 2003, in conjunction with the International Summer Music School Pučišća, on the island of Brač.

Together with the group Magazin, she performed the song "Nostalgija" for Croatia in the Eurovision Song Contest 1995 and finished 6th in a field of 23 entries.

== Book ==
- Ljuven sanak, a collection of seventy songs of Croatian composers from the 16th century to this day, published by Music Play, Zagreb, 2004

Achievements
Preceded by Tony Cetinski with "Nek' ti bude ljubav sva"	Croatia in the Eurovision Song Contest; 1995 (with Magazin)	Succeeded by Maja Blagdan with "Sveta ljubav"
