= Eurovision Song Contest 1995 =

International song competition

Date and venue
- Final: 13 May 1995
- Venue: Point Theatre; Dublin, Ireland

Organisation
- Organiser: European Broadcasting Union (EBU)
- Scrutineer: Christian Clausen

Production
- Host broadcaster: Radio Telefís Éireann (RTÉ)
- Director: John Comiskey
- Executive producer: John McHugh
- Musical director: Noel Kelehan
- Presenter: Mary Kennedy

Participants
- Number of entries: 23
- Returning countries: Belgium; Denmark; Israel; Slovenia; Turkey
- Non-returning countries: Estonia; Finland; Lithuania; Netherlands; Romania; Slovakia; Switzerland
- Participation map: Competing countries Relegated countries unable to participate due to poor results in previous contests Countries that participated in the past but not in 1995

Vote
- Voting system: Each country awarded 12, 10, 8-1 point(s) to their 10 favourite songs
- Winning song: Norway; "Nocturne"

The Eurovision Song Contest 1995 was the 40th edition of the Eurovision Song Contest, held on 13 May 1995 at the Point Theatre in Dublin, Ireland, and presented by Mary Kennedy. It was organised by the European Broadcasting Union (EBU) and host broadcaster Radio Telefís Éireann (RTÉ), who staged the event after winning the 1994 contest for Ireland with the song "Rock 'n' Roll Kids" by Paul Harrington and Charlie McGettigan. It was the third consecutive contest to be held in Ireland – the first and only time in the history of the event that a country has hosted three editions in a row – and the second consecutive edition to be held in the Point Theatre in Dublin.

Broadcasters from twenty-three countries participated in the contest; Estonia, Finland, Lithuania, the Netherlands, Romania, Slovakia, and Switzerland were relegated as the lowest-scoring countries in the previous edition, getting replaced by Belgium, Denmark, Israel, Slovenia, and Turkey, returning after being relegated following the 1993 edition.

The winner was Norway with the song "Nocturne", composed by Rolf Løvland, written by Petter Skavlan and performed by Secret Garden. Spain, Sweden, France, and Denmark rounded out the top five, with Spain achieving its best result since 1979. Croatia and Slovenia also achieved their best results so far, placing sixth and seventh respectively, while Germany finished in last place for the fourth time.

== Location ==
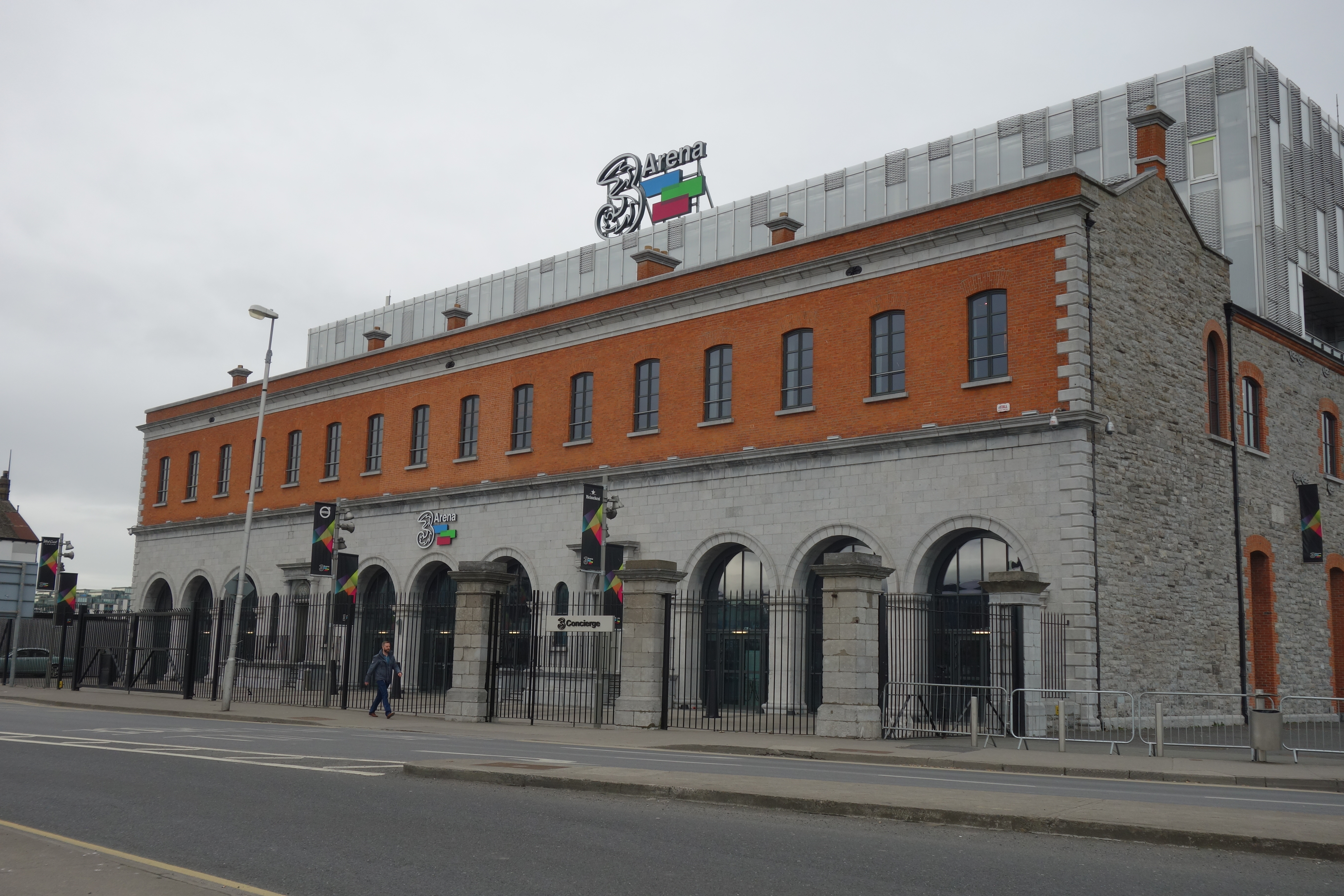
Point Theatre, Dublin – host venue of the 1995 contest (pictured following redevelopment)

The 1995 contest took place in Dublin, Ireland, following the country's victory at the 1994 edition with the song "Rock 'n' Roll Kids", performed by Paul Harrington and Charlie McGettigan. It was the sixth time that Ireland had hosted the contest, having previously staged the event in 1971, 1981, 1988, 1993 and 1994, with all previous events held in Dublin except the 1993 contest which was held in Millstreet. Ireland thus became the first, and as of 2026 the only country to have hosted three successive contests.

The selected venue was the Point Theatre, a concert and events venue located amongst the Dublin Docklands which had originally been built as a train depot to serve the nearby port. Opened as a music venue in 1988, it was closed for redevelopment and expansion in 2008 and is now known as the 3Arena. Having previously hosted the 1994 contest, Dublin became the first city to host two consecutive Eurovision Song Contests, with the Point Theatre also serving as the host venue for the second year in a row.

Alternative venues in Galway and Limerick were considered by RTÉ, however Dublin was chosen to stage the contest again as it was judged to have been the more cost-effective location. Proposals by the British broadcaster BBC to host the contest, either by themselves or as a joint production hosted in Belfast, the capital city of Northern Ireland, were also rejected by RTÉ as the Irish broadcaster chose to produce the contest on its own. However, RTÉ did request a rule change to relieve them of the responsibility of producing the contest again should Ireland produce a fourth consecutive winner, which was accepted by the EBU.

== Participants ==
Eurovision Song Contest 1995 – Participation summaries by country
- Austria; Belgium; Bosnia and Herzegovina; Croatia; Cyprus; Denmark; France; Germany; Greece; Hungary; Iceland; Ireland; Israel; Malta; Norway; Poland; Portugal; Russia; Slovenia; Spain; Sweden; Turkey; United Kingdom

Twenty-three countries were permitted to participate in the contest, which was to comprise the sixteen highest-scoring countries in the 1994 contest and returning countries that had been relegated and prevented from participating in the previous year's event. The total line-up was reduced from the twenty-five countries which participated in the 1994 contest to ensure that the event would not last longer than three hours. Of the seven countries which did not participate in 1994, Belgium, Denmark, Israel, Slovenia, and Turkey returned to the contest, while Italy and Luxembourg declined the invitation, which resulted in Austria and Spain, which were originally relegated, being allowed back into the line-up. Estonia, Finland, Lithuania, the Netherlands, Romania, Slovakia, and Switzerland, as the lowest-scoring countries from the previous year's event, were thus ultimately relegated and were required to miss this event. Switzerland did not participate in the contest for the first time, leaving Germany as the sole country to have participated in every edition of the contest to that point.

The contest featured two representatives who had previously performed in the contest. Arzu Ece had previously represented Turkey in 1989 as a member of the group Pan, and Alexandros Panayi had provided backing vocals for Cyprus in 1989 and in 1991. Additionally, several artists who had previously participated in the event as main vocalists returned as backing vocalists at this year's event: Stefán Hilmarsson and Eyjólfur Kristjánsson returned to the contest as backing singers for the Icelandic entrant Bo Halldórsson, with Stefán having previously represented Iceland in 1988 as a member of Beathoven and both Stefán and Eyjólfur having represented Iceland in 1991 as a duo; Gary Lux, who had previously represented Austria in 1983, as a member of the group Westend, and as a solo artist in 1985 and 1987, supported Stella Jones at this year's event; and José María Guzmán, who represented Spain in 1986 as part of the group Cadillac, was among Anabel Conde's backing singers.

Eurovision Song Contest 1995 participants
Country	Broadcaster	Artist	Song	Language	Songwriter(s)	Conductor
Austria	ORF	Stella Jones	"Die Welt dreht sich verkehrt"	German	Mischa Krausz	Michael Kienzl
Belgium	RTBF	Frédéric Etherlinck	"La voix est libre"	French	Pierre Theunis	Alec Mansion
Bosnia and Herzegovina	RTVBiH	Davor Popović	"Dvadeset prvi vijek"	Bosnian	Sinan Alimanović; Zlatan Fazlić	Sinan Alimanović
Croatia	HRT	Magazin and Lidija	"Nostalgija"	Croatian	Tonči Huljić; Vjekoslava Huljić	Stipica Kalogjera
Cyprus	CyBC	Alexandros Panayi	"Sti fotia" (Στη φωτιά)	Greek	Alexandros Panayi	George Theofanous
Denmark	DR	Aud Wilken	"Fra Mols til Skagen"	Danish	Lise Cabble; Mette Mathiesen	Frede Ewert
France	France Télévision	Nathalie Santamaria	"Il me donne rendez-vous"	French	Didier Barbelivien; François Bernheim	Michel Bernholc
Germany	MDR (Note: On behalf of the German public broadcasting consortium ARD)	Stone & Stone	"Verliebt in Dich"	German	Cheyenne Stone	Hermann Weindorf
Greece	ERT	Elina Konstantopoulou	"Pia prosefhi" (Ποιά προσευχή)	Greek	Antonis Pappas; Nikos Terzis	Haris Andreadis
Hungary	MTV	Csaba Szigeti	"Új név egy régi ház falán"	Hungarian	Ferenc Balázs; Attila Horváth	Miklós Malek
Iceland	RÚV	Bo Halldórsson	"Núna"	Icelandic	Björgvin Halldórsson; Jón Örn Marinósson; Ed Welch	Frank McNamara
Ireland	RTÉ	Eddie Friel	"Dreamin'"	English	Richard Abbott; Barry Woods	Noel Kelehan
Israel	IBA	Liora	"Amen" (אמן)	Hebrew	Hamutal Ben Ze'ev; Moshe Datz	Gadi Goldman
Malta	PBS	Mike Spiteri	"Keep Me in Mind"	English	Ray Agius; Alfred Sant	Ray Agius
Norway	NRK	Secret Garden (Note: Performance contains uncredited live vocals from Gunnhild Tvinnereim.)	"Nocturne"	Norwegian	Rolf Løvland; Petter Skavlan	Geir Langslet
Poland	TVP	Justyna	"Sama"	Polish	Mateusz Pospieszalski; Wojciech Waglewski	Noel Kelehan
Portugal	RTP	Tó Cruz	"Baunilha e chocolate"	Portuguese	António Victorino de Almeida; Rosa Lobato de Faria	Thilo Krasmann
Russia	ORT	Philipp Kirkorov	"Kolybelnaya dlya vulkana" (Колыбельная для вулкана)	Russian	Ilya Bershadsky; Ilya Reznik	Mikhail Finberg
Slovenia	RTVSLO	Darja Švajger	"Prisluhni mi"	Slovene	Sašo Fajon; Primož Peterca	Jože Privšek
Spain	TVE	Anabel Conde	"Vuelve conmigo"	Spanish	José María Purón	Eduardo Leiva
Sweden	SVT	Jan Johansen	"Se på mej"	Swedish	Håkan Almqvist; Ingela "Pling" Forsman; Bobby Ljunggren	Anders Berglund
Turkey	TRT	Arzu Ece	"Sev!"	Turkish	Melih Kibar; Zeynep Talu	Melih Kibar
United Kingdom	BBC	Love City Groove	"Love City Groove"	English	Paul Hardy; Tatiana Mais; Stephen "Beanz" Rudden; Jay Williams	Mike Dixon

== Production and format ==
The Eurovision Song Contest 1995 was produced by the Irish public broadcaster Radio Telefís Éireann (RTÉ). John McHugh served as executive producer, John Comiskey served as director, Alan Farquharson served as designer, and Noel Kelehan served as musical director, leading the RTÉ Concert Orchestra. A separate musical director could be nominated by each participating delegation to lead the orchestra during its country's performance, with the host musical director also available to conduct for those countries which did not nominate their own conductor. On behalf of the contest organisers, the European Broadcasting Union (EBU), the event was overseen by Christian Clausen as scrutineer. RTÉ was reported to have spent IR£2.3 million on staging the contest, with the Northern Ireland Tourist Board and the National Lottery among the contest's sponsors. Through the partnership with the National Lottery, around 1,000 places in the audience were filled by members of the public who had won tickets by playing scratchcards.

Each participating broadcaster submitted one song, which was required to be no longer than three minutes in duration and performed in the language, or one of the languages, of the country which it represented. A maximum of six performers were allowed on stage during each country's performance, and all participants were required to have reached the age of 16 in the year of the contest. Each entry could utilise all or part of the live orchestra and could use instrumental-only backing tracks, however any backing tracks used could only include the sound of instruments featured on stage being mimed by the performers.

Following the confirmation of the twenty-three competing countries, the draw to determine the running order was held on 9 December 1994.

The results of the 1995 contest were determined through the same scoring system as had first been introduced in 1975: each country awarded twelve points to its favourite entry, followed by ten points to its second favourite, and then awarded points in decreasing value from eight to one for the remaining songs which featured in the country's top ten, with countries unable to vote for their own entry. The points awarded by each country were determined by an assembled jury of sixteen individuals, which was required to be split evenly between members of the public and music professionals, between men and women, and by age. Each jury member voted in secret and awarded between one and ten votes to each participating song, excluding that from their own country and with no abstentions permitted. The votes of each member were collected following the country's performance and then tallied by the non-voting jury chairperson to determine the points to be awarded. In any cases where two or more songs in the top ten received the same number of votes, a show of hands by all jury members was used to determine the final placing.

Rehearsals in the contest venue for the competing acts began on 8 May 1995. Each country had two technical rehearsals in the week approaching the contest, with countries rehearsing in the order in which they would perform. The first rehearsals took place on 8 and 9 May, with each country allowed 40 minutes total on stage, with an opportunity to review recordings with producers and to consult on suggested changes afterwards, followed by a 20 minute press conference. Each country's second rehearsals took place on 10 and 11 May, with 30 minutes total on stage. Three dress rehearsals were held with all artists, two held in the afternoon and evening of 12 May and one final rehearsal in the afternoon of 13 May. An audience was present for the second dress rehearsal in the evening of 12 May, with this rehearsal also recorded for use as a production stand-by in case of problems during the live contest. The competing delegations were additionally invited to a welcome reception during the week in the build-up to the event, organised by Irish Ferries and hosted at the Royal Hospital Kilmainham on the evening of 8 May.

== Contest overview ==
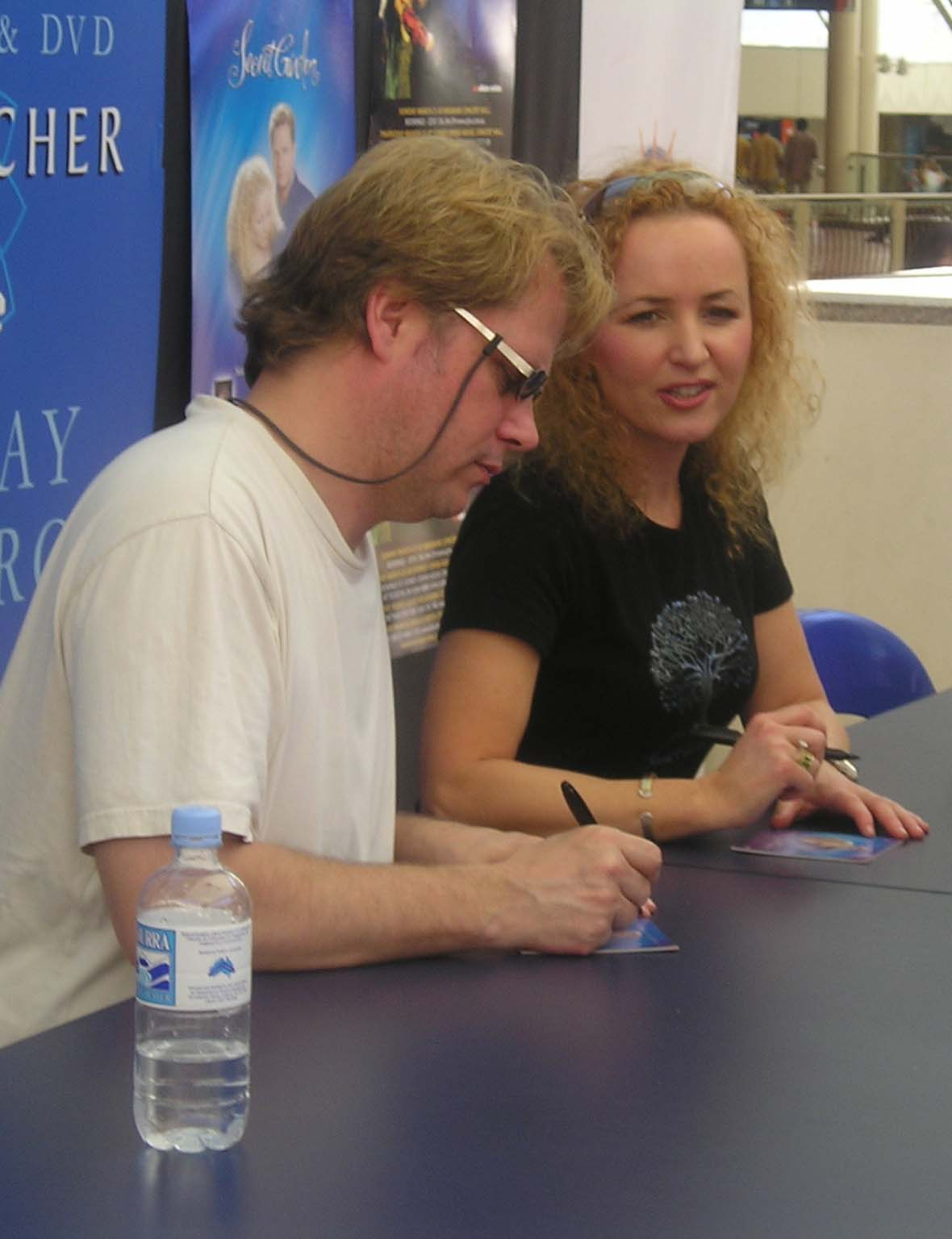
Rolf Løvland and Fionnuala Sherry, the winning artists of the 1995 Eurovision Song Contest as Secret Garden

The contest took place on 13 May 1995 at 20:00 (IST) and lasted 2 hours and 51 minutes. The show was presented by the Irish journalist and television presenter Mary Kennedy. Kennedy had previously served as the stand-by presenter at the 1981 contest, understudying for Doireann Ní Bhriain.

To celebrate the contest's fortieth anniversary, the show opened with a four-minute sequence, directed by Pat Cowap, containing clips and performances from previous contests; Cowap had previously served as director of the 1994 contest. The contest's interval act, entitled "Lumen", was an original piece composed by Mícheál Ó Súilleabháin and which combined Gregorian chant and sean-nós singing with contemporary music. Among the performers of "Lumen" were Súilleabháin on piano, Scottish percussionist Evelyn Glennie, Irish singers Brian Kennedy and Nóirín Ní Riain, members of the Irish folk band Clannad, the Benedictine monks of Glenstal Abbey, and the RTÉ Concert Orchestra conducted by Proinnsías Ó Duinn. Kennedy would go on to perform at Eurovision again as a contestant, representing Ireland in the 2006 contest. The trophy awarded to the winners was designed by Kevin O'Dwyer, and was presented by the previous year's winning artists Paul Harrington and Charlie McGettigan.

The winner was Norway represented by the song "Nocturne", composed by Rolf Løvland, written by Petter Skavlan and performed by Secret Garden. This was Norway's second contest win, following the victory by Bobbysocks! ten years previously at the 1985 contest with "La det swinge", which was also written by Rolf Løvland; Løvland thus became one of four individuals to have won the contest more than once as an artist or songwriter up to that point in time, alongside Willy van Hemert, Yves Dessca and Johnny Logan. The group Secret Garden consisted principally of Norwegian composer and pianist Løvland and Irish violinist Fionnuala Sherry and was formed after the pair had met at the 1994 contest, where Sherry was a member of the RTÉ Concert Orchestra and Løvland was in attendance as composer of that year's Norwegian entry. For their performance during the contest they were joined by instrumentalists Hans Fredrik Jacobsen and Åsa Jinder and singer Gunnhild Tvinnereim. "Nocturne" was a largely instrumental piece featuring only 24 words in total, with brief vocals only at the start and end of the song performed by Tvinnereim. The traditional winner's reprise performance featured English lyrics, also written by Skavlan, comprising 30 words in total.

Spain achieved its best result since 1979 by finishing as the contest's runner-up, Croatia and Slovenia gained their highest placements to date by finishing in sixth and seventh place respectively, while conversely Germany finished in last place for the fourth time. The 1995 contest was the last edition of the contest where the top three songs were all performed in a language other than English until the 2021 event.

Results of the Eurovision Song Contest 1995
R/O	Country	Artist	Song	Points	Place
1	Poland	Justyna	"Sama"	15	18
2	Ireland	Eddie Friel	"Dreamin'"	44	14
3	Germany	Stone & Stone	"Verliebt in Dich"	1	23
4	Bosnia and Herzegovina	Davor Popović	"Dvadeset prvi vijek"	14	19
5	Norway	Secret Garden	"Nocturne"	148	1
6	Russia	Philipp Kirkorov	"Kolybelnaya dlya vulkana"	17	17
7	Iceland	Bo Halldórsson	"Núna"	31	15
8	Austria	Stella Jones	"Die Welt dreht sich verkehrt"	67	13
9	Spain	Anabel Conde	"Vuelve conmigo"	119	2
10	Turkey	Arzu Ece	"Sev!"	21	16
11	Croatia	Magazin and Lidija	"Nostalgija"	91	6
12	France	Nathalie Santamaria	"Il me donne rendez-vous"	94	4
13	Hungary	Csaba Szigeti	"Új név egy régi ház falán"	3	22
14	Belgium	Frédéric Etherlinck	"La voix est libre"	8	20
15	United Kingdom	Love City Groove	"Love City Groove"	76	10
16	Portugal	Tó Cruz	"Baunilha e chocolate"	5	21
17	Cyprus	Alexandros Panayi	"Sti fotia"	79	9
18	Sweden	Jan Johansen	"Se på mej"	100	3
19	Denmark	Aud Wilken	"Fra Mols til Skagen"	92	5
20	Slovenia	Darja Švajger	"Prisluhni mi"	84	7
21	Israel	Liora	"Amen"	81	8
22	Malta	Mike Spiteri	"Keep Me in Mind"	76	10
23	Greece	Elina Konstantopoulou	"Pia prosefhi"	68	12

=== Spokespersons ===
Each participating broadcaster appointed a spokesperson who was responsible for announcing, in English or French, the votes for its respective country. As had been the case in the 1994 contest, the spokespersons were connected via satellite and appeared in vision during the broadcast. Spokespersons at the 1995 contest are listed below.

1. Poland – Jan Chojnacki
2. Ireland – Eileen Dunne
3. Germany – Carmen Nebel
4. Bosnia and Herzegovina – Diana Grković-Foretić
5. Norway – Sverre Christophersen
6. Russia – Marina Danielian
7. Iceland – Áslaug Dóra Eyjólfsdóttir
8. Austria – Tilia Herold
9. Spain – Belén Fernández de Henestrosa
10. Turkey – Ömer Önder
11. Croatia – Daniela Trbović
12. France – Thierry Beccaro
13. Hungary – Katalin Bogyay
14. Belgium – Marie-Françoise Renson
15. United Kingdom – Colin Berry
16. Portugal – Serenella Andrade
17. Cyprus – Andreas Iakovidis
18. Sweden – Björn Hedman
19. Denmark – Bent Henius
20. Slovenia – Miša Molk
21. Israel – Daniel Pe'er
22. Malta – Stephanie Farrugia
23. Greece – Fotini Giannoulatou

== Detailed voting results ==
Jury voting was used to determine the points awarded by all countries. The announcement of the results from each country was conducted in the order in which they performed, with the spokespersons announcing their country's points in English or French in ascending order. The detailed breakdown of the points awarded by each country is listed in the tables below.

Detailed voting results of the Eurovision Song Contest 1995
		Total score	Poland	Ireland	Germany	Bosnia and Herzegovina	Norway	Russia	Iceland	Austria	Spain	Turkey	Croatia	France	Hungary	Belgium	United Kingdom	Portugal	Cyprus	Sweden	Denmark	Slovenia	Israel	Malta	Greece
Contestants	Poland	15					4		6						1			1							3
Contestants	Ireland	44			1	5	1	5	3		3	5		1						10	1	5			4
Contestants	Germany	1																						1	
Contestants	Bosnia and Herzegovina	14										3	8								3				
Contestants	Norway	**148**	**12**	10	4	1		**12**	**12**		4	**12**		10	6	5	4	**12**	7		2	7	10	6	**12**
Contestants	Russia	17					10						6						1						
Contestants	Iceland	31		6			2	3		4				2						6	8				
Contestants	Austria	67	2				3				6	4		8	4	10	5	2		4	10		2		7
Contestants	Spain	119	8	2	6	8			5			8	10	7	2	**12**	8	7	10				**12**	8	6
Contestants	Turkey	21									2		5			1	2					3	1	7	
Contestants	Croatia	91		3		10	7		10		**12**	7						4	5			**12**	4	**12**	5
Contestants	France	94	7	5	8		6		8	10		2	3		10	6	1		2	3	6	8	7		2
Contestants	Hungary	3						2			1														
Contestants	Belgium	8								1	7														
Contestants	United Kingdom	76	5	1		4		1		**12**				**12**	7	7		10		5	7		5		
Contestants	Portugal	5												4											1
Contestants	Cyprus	79	1		3		5	4	2		5		1		**12**	8	3			8	5	4	6	4	8
Contestants	Sweden	100	10	**12**	**12**	2	8	6	4	8		1		3			6	8	4		**12**	1		3	
Contestants	Denmark	92	3	7	7	3	**12**	10	7	7		6			3	3		6		**12**		6			
Contestants	Slovenia	84	4	8	5	6		7	1	3			2		8		10	5	3	7			3	2	10
Contestants	Israel	81			10	7		8		6			4		5	4	**12**		8	2		10		5	
Contestants	Malta	76		4	2	**12**				2	10	10	**12**	6			7		6	1	4				
Contestants	Greece	68	6							5	8		7	5		2		3	**12**			2	8	10	

=== 12 points ===
The below table summarises how the maximum 12 points were awarded from one country to another. The winning country is shown in bold. Norway received the maximum score of 12 points from six of the voting countries, with Croatia and Sweden each receiving three sets of 12 points, Denmark, Malta, Spain and the United Kingdom receiving two sets each, and Cyprus, Greece and Israel each receiving one maximum score.

Distribution of 12 points awarded at the Eurovision Song Contest 1995
N.	Contestant	Nation(s) giving 12 points
6	**Norway**	Greece, Iceland, Poland, Portugal, Russia, Turkey
3	Croatia	Malta, Slovenia, Spain
3	Sweden	Denmark, Germany, Ireland
2	Denmark	Norway, Sweden
2	Malta	Bosnia and Herzegovina, Croatia
2	Spain	Belgium, Israel
2	United Kingdom	Austria, France
1	Cyprus	Hungary
1	Greece	Cyprus
1	Israel	United Kingdom

== Broadcasts ==
Each participating broadcaster was required to relay the contest via its networks. Non-participating EBU member broadcasters were also able to relay the contest as "passive participants". Broadcasters were able to send commentators to provide coverage of the contest in their own native language and to relay information about the artists and songs to their television viewers. These commentators were typically sent to the venue to report on the event, and were able to provide commentary from small booths constructed at the back of the venue. Known details on the broadcasts in each country, including the specific broadcasting stations and commentators are shown in the tables below.

Broadcasters and commentators in participating countries
Country	Broadcaster	Channel(s)	Commentator(s)	Ref.
Austria	ORF	ORF 1	Ernst Grissemann	
Austria	ORF	FM4	Stermann & Grissemann	
Belgium	RTBF	RTBF1	Jean-Pierre Hautier	
Belgium	BRTN	TV1	André Vermeulen	
Bosnia and Herzegovina	RTVBiH	TVBiH		
Croatia	HRT	HRT 1	Aleksandar Kostadinov	
Cyprus	CyBC	RIK 1	Neofytos Taliotis	
Denmark	DR	DR TV, DR P3	Jørgen de Mylius	
France	France Télévision	France 2	Olivier Minne	
Germany	ARD	Erstes Deutsches Fernsehen	Horst Senker	
Hungary	MTV	MTV2	István Vágó	
Iceland	RÚV	Sjónvarpið	Jakob Frímann Magnússon	
Ireland	RTÉ	RTÉ 1	Pat Kenny	
Ireland	RTÉ	RTÉ Radio 1	Larry Gogan	
Malta	PBS	TVM		
Norway	NRK	NRK Fjernsynet	Annette Groth	
Norway	NRK	NRK P1	Stein Dag Jensen	
Poland	TVP	TVP1	Artur Orzech	
Portugal	RTP	RTP Canal 1 (Note: Additional live broadcast on RTP Internacional)	Ana do Carmo	
Russia	ORT (Note: Delayed broadcast without voting sequence on 15 May 1995 at 00:30 (MSD))		Olesya Trifonova	
Russia	Radio 101		Olesya Trifonova	
Slovenia	RTVSLO	SLO 1	Damjana Golavšek	
Slovenia	RTVSLO	Val 202		
Spain	TVE	La Primera (Note: Additional deferred broadcast on TVE Internacional at 23:10 (CEST))	José Luis Uribarri	
Sweden	SVT	TV2	Pernilla Månsson	
Sweden	SR	SR P3, SR P4	Claes-Johan Larsson and Lisa Syrén	
Turkey	TRT	TRT 1		
United Kingdom	BBC	BBC1 (Note: Additional live broadcast on BBC Prime)	Terry Wogan	
United Kingdom	BBC	BBC Radio 2	Ken Bruce	

Broadcasters and commentators in non-participating countries
Country	Broadcaster	Channel(s)	Commentator(s)	Ref.
Australia	SBS	SBS TV (Note: Deferred broadcast the following day at 20:30 (AEST))		
Estonia	ETV			
Estonia	STV	STV4		
Faroe Islands	SvF			
Finland	YLE	TV1	Erkki Pohjanheimo and Olli Ahvenlahti	
Finland	YLE	Radio Suomi	Iris Mattila and Ossi Runne	
Greenland	KNR	KNR (Note: Deferred broadcast at 21:00 (WGST))		
Netherlands	NOS	Nederland 3	Paul de Leeuw	
Netherlands Antilles	ATM	TeleCuraçao (Note: Delayed broadcast on 3 June 1995 at 22:00 (ADT))		
Romania	TVR	TVR 1		
Switzerland	SRG SSR	Schweiz 4	Heinz Margot	
Switzerland	SRG SSR	Suisse 4	Jean-Marc Richard	
Yugoslavia	RTS	RTS 3K		

== Notes and references ==
=== Bibliography ===
- O'Connor, John Kennedy (2010). The Eurovision Song Contest: The Official History (2nd ed.). London, United Kingdom: Carlton Books. ISBN 978-1-84732-521-1.
- Roxburgh, Gordon (2020). Songs for Europe: The United Kingdom at the Eurovision Song Contest. Vol. Four: The 1990s. Prestatyn, United Kingdom: Telos Publishing. ISBN 978-1-84583-163-9.
- Thorsson, Leif; Verhage, Martin (2006). Melodifestivalen genom tiderna : de svenska uttagningarna och internationella finalerna [Melodifestivalen through the ages: the Swedish selections and international finals] (in Swedish). Stockholm, Sweden: Premium Publishing. ISBN 91-89136-29-2.
