= Pernilla Månsson Colt =

Swedish television presenter, producer, editor and journalist

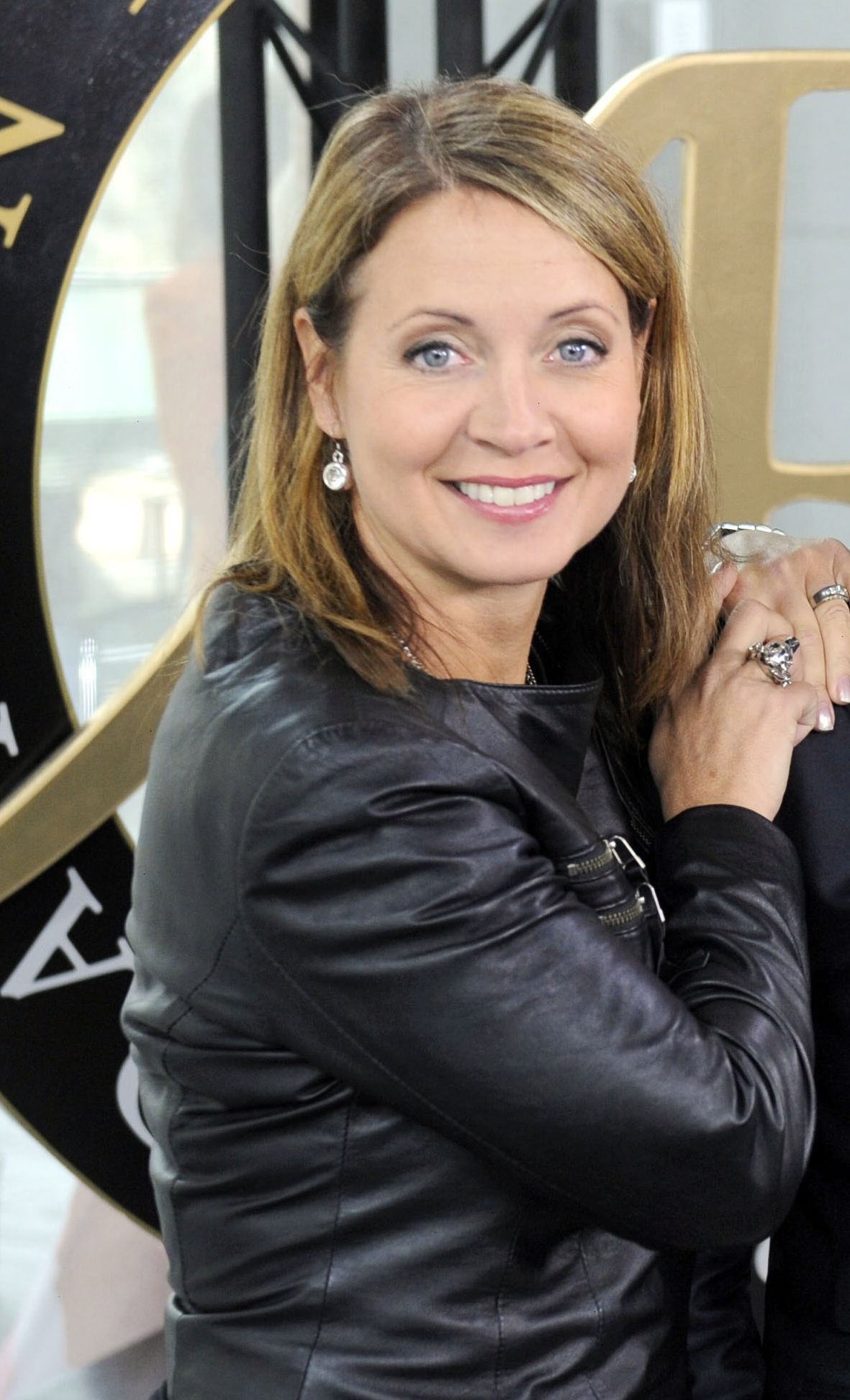
- Born: Eva Pernilla Elisabet Månsson; 23 December 1966 (age 58); Örebro, Örebro County, Sweden
- Occupation(s): Presenter, producer, editor, journalist
- Employer: Sveriges Television
- Spouse: Stellan Colt
- Children: 2

Eva Pernilla Elisabet Månsson Colt (née Månsson, 23 December 1966) is a Swedish television presenter, producer, editor, and journalist.

== Biography ==
Månsson Colt was born in Örebro, Örebro County. At the age of 16, and after three years of studying cultural studies at Risbergska School in Örebro, she began working for the local radio station, P4 Örebro, eventually becoming a permanent hire. At 24, she worked at Sveriges Television (SVT)'s youth office in Växjö.

Månsson Colt currently works as a producer for SVT's Antikrundan; the Swedish version of the BBC show: Antiques Roadshow. She presents the gardening show, Trädgårdsonsdag (Swedish: Garden Wednesday) along with Tareq Taylor, and writes columns for the newspaper Drömhem & Trädgård (Swedish: Dream Home & Garden).

Månsson Colt is married to musician Stellan Colt, and currently lives in Klagshamn, Skåne County. The couple has two sons.

== Work ==
- 1992–1993: PM
- Månsson & media
- Korseld
- 1995: Melodifestivalen 1995 (Presenter)
- 1998: Eurovision Song Contest 1995 (Swedish commentator)
- 1997: Centralen
- 1998: Melodifestivalen 1998 (Presenter)
- 1998: Eurovision Song Contest 1998 (Swedish commentator)
- 1999–2003: Bumerang (Presenter)
- 2000: Eurovision Song Contest 2000 (Swedish commentator)
- 2000: En kväll för världens barn
- 2000: Dansk skalle, svensk tiger (Presenter)
- 2000: Opening of the Øresund Bridge
- Packat & Klart
- Anders och Måns (Guest)
- Bästa Formen
- Sverige (Editor)
- Årets kock
- Trädgårdsonsdag
- 2013: Eurovision Song Contest 2013

- Semi-final allocation draw presenter.
- Opening ceremony presenter at the Malmö Opera and Music Theatre.

- 2014: Husdrömmar

Preceded by Pekka Heino	Eurovision Song Contest – Swedish Commentator; 1995	Succeeded by Björn Kjellman
Preceded by Jan Jingryd	Eurovision Song Contest – Swedish Commentator; 1998	Succeeded by Pekka Heino and Anders Berglund
Preceded by Pekka Heino and Anders Berglund	Eurovision Song Contest – Swedish Commentator; 2000	Succeeded by Henrik Olsson
