= Norway in the Eurovision Song Contest 1995 =

- Eurovision Song Contest 1995
- Participating broadcaster: Norsk rikskringkasting (NRK)
- Country: Norway
- Selection process: Melodi Grand Prix 1995
- Selection date: 1 April 1995

Competing entry
- Song: "Nocturne"
- Artist: Secret Garden
- Songwriters: Rolf Løvland; Petter Skavlan

Placement
- Final result: 1st, 148 points

Participation chronology

Norway was represented at the Eurovision Song Contest 1995 with the song "Nocturne", composed by Rolf Løvland, with lyrics by Petter Skavlan, and performed by Secret Garden. The Norwegian participating broadcaster, Norsk rikskringkasting (NRK), organised the national final Melodi Grand Prix 1995 in order to select its entry for the contest. The entry eventually won the Eurovision Song Contest.

== Before Eurovision ==
=== Melodi Grand Prix 1995 ===
==== Competing entries ====
Artist	Song	Songwriter(s)
After Eight	"Oh ramalama"	Bjørn Terje Bråthen
Arnold B Family	"La oss feire livet"	Thomas Børud, Arnold Børud
Bente Bøe	"Mens tiden går"	Per Fredrik Kjølner, Lene Lauritsen Kjølner
Betty and the Beagles	"Sanger i regn"	Per Fredrik Kjølner, Lene Lauritsen Kjølner
Camilla Maria Myrås	"Bli hos meg"	Kjell Reianes
Elisabeth Ødegård Widmer	"Til en stjerne"	Bjørn Jørgensen, Kirsti Dahl Johansen
Elisabeth Røise and Ole-Marius Johnson	"Solskinn gir liv"	Per Røise, May Bjerknes
Fem damer med mannskor	"Ham og meg"	Geir Rebbestad, Trond Brænne
Geir Rønning	"Uten lyst, uten tro"	Geir Rønning
Gry Jeanette Antonsen	"Fly av sted"	Karsten Kjos, Per Løvlie
Helga Hægeland Thomassen	"Kom inn te mæ"	Stein Berge Svendsen, Helga Hægeland Thomassen
Irene Bjaanes	"En liten måne"	Gunnar Refsdal
Marianne Elstad	"Kan ikke du?"	Gunnar Refsdal
Nina Grønvold	"Kjærlighet for første gang"	Rolf Graf
Ole Ask	"Kjære min engel"	Nick Borgen, Arve Sigvaldsen
Secret Garden (Note: "Nocturne" features uncredited vocals from Norwegian singer Gunnhild Tvinnereim.)	"Nocturne"	Rolf Løvland, Petter Skavlan
Svein O. Greger	"Dans"	Svein O. Greger, Vidar Kristensen
Tone Krohn Henriksen	"Fjelltonelek"	Per Fredrik Kjølner, Astor Andersen

==== Semi-finals ====
Nine semi-finals were held weekly between 14 January and 18 March 1995. Two songs competed in each semi-final with the winner from each semi-final qualifying for the final, along with one of the losing songs which were given wildcards.

Semi-final 1 – 14 January 1995
R/O	Artist	Song	Televote	Place	Result
1	Irene Bjaanes	"En liten måne"	23%	2	—N/a
2	Helga Hægeland Thomassen	"Kom inn te mæ"	77%	1	Qualified

Semi-final 2 – 21 January 1995
R/O	Artist	Song	Televote	Place	Result
1	Svein O. Greger	"Dans"	70%	1	Qualified
2	Betty and the Beagles	"Sanger i regn"	30%	2	—N/a

Semi-final 3 – 28 January 1995
R/O	Artist	Song	Televote	Place	Result
1	Gry Jeanette Antonsen	"Fly av sted"	49%	2	—N/a
2	Geir Rønning	"Uten lyst, uten tro"	51%	1	Qualified

Semi-final 4 – 4 February 1995
R/O	Artist	Song	Televote	Place	Result
1	Fem damer med mannskor	"Ham og meg"	31%	2	—N/a
2	Marianne Elstad	"Kan ikke du?"	69%	1	Qualified

Semi-final 5 – 11 February 1995
R/O	Artist	Song	Televote	Place	Result
1	Arnold B Family	"La oss feire livet"	52%	1	Qualified
2	Elisabeth Ødegård Widmer	"Til en stjerne"	48%	2	Wildcard

Semi-final 6 – 18 February 1995
R/O	Artist	Song	Televote	Place	Result
1	After Eight	"Oh ramalama"	58%	1	Qualified
2	Tone Krohn Henriksen	"Fjelltonelek"	42%	2	—N/a

Semi-final 7 – 25 February 1995
R/O	Artist	Song	Televote	Place	Result
1	Bente Bøe	"Mens tiden går"	57%	1	Qualified
2	Camilla Maria Myrås	"Bli hos meg"	43%	2	—N/a

Semi-final 8 – 11 March 1995
R/O	Artist	Song	Televote	Place	Result
1	Secret Garden	"Nocturne"	52%	1	Qualified
2	Ole Ask	"Kjære min engel"	48%	2	—N/a

Semi-final 9 – 18 March 1995
R/O	Artist	Song	Televote	Place	Result
1	Nina Grønvold	"Kjærlighet for første gang"	65%	1	Qualified
2	Elisabeth Røise and Ole-Marius Johnson	"Solskinn gir liv"	35%	2	—N/a

==== Final ====
NRK held the final at its studios in Oslo, hosted by Petter Nome. Ten songs took part with the winner being chosen by voting from regional juries, a jury based in Dublin consisting of previous Irish Eurovision winners, and televoting. Other participants included Geir Rønning, who would later represent Finland at the 2005 contest.

Final – 1 April 1995
R/O	Artist	Song	Jury	Televote	Total	Place
1	After Eight	"Oh ramalama"	250	42	292	3
2	Helga Hægeland Thomassen	"Kom inn te mæ"	106	6	112	8
3	Geir Rønning	"Uten lyst, uten tro"	125	9	134	7
4	Marianne Elstad	"Kan ikke du?"	73	6	79	10
5	Bente Boe	"Mens tiden går"	126	21	147	5
6	Arnold B. Family	"La oss feire livet"	264	63	327	2
7	Elisabeth Ødegaard Widmer	"Til en stjerne"	81	6	87	9
8	Svein O. Greger	"Dans"	116	27	143	6
9	Nina Grønvold	"Kjærlighet for første gang"	163	51	214	4
10	Secret Garden	"Nocturne"	317	87	404	1

Detailed Jury Votes
R/O	Song	Dublin	Bergen	Trondheim	Oslo	Total
1	"Oh ramalama"	75	85	50	40	250
2	"Kom inn te mæ"	40	14	15	37	106
3	"Uten lyst, uten tro"	35	22	35	33	125
4	"Kan ikke du?"	40	0	15	18	73
5	"Mens tiden går"	55	44	5	22	126
6	"La oss feire livet"	80	49	80	55	264
7	"Til en stjerne"	25	18	5	33	81
8	"Dans"	20	36	35	25	116
9	"Kjærlighet for første gang"	70	18	50	25	163
10	"Nocturne"	80	90	85	62	317

== At Eurovision ==
Secret Garden performed fifth on the night of the contest, following Bosnia and Herzegovina and preceding Russia. They won the contest with 148 points, receiving six twelve points in total. This was Norway's second victory in the competition, following 1985.

The contest was broadcast on NRK Fjernsynet (with commentary by Annette Groth) and on radio station NRK P1 (with commentary by Stein Dag Jensen).

=== Voting ===
Points awarded to Norway
Score	Country
12 points	Greece; Iceland; Poland; Portugal; Russia; Turkey
10 points	France; Ireland; Israel
8 points	
7 points	Cyprus; Slovenia
6 points	Hungary; Malta
5 points	Belgium
4 points	Germany; Spain; United Kingdom
3 points	
2 points	Denmark
1 point	Bosnia and Herzegovina

Points awarded by Norway
Score	Country
12 points	Denmark
10 points	Russia
8 points	Sweden
7 points	Croatia
6 points	France
5 points	Cyprus
4 points	Poland
3 points	Austria
2 points	Iceland
1 point	Ireland
