= Sweden in the Eurovision Song Contest 1995 =

- Eurovision Song Contest 1995
- Participating broadcaster: Sveriges Television (SVT)
- Country: Sweden
- Selection process: Melodifestivalen 1995
- Selection date: 24 February 1995

Competing entry
- Song: "Se på mig"
- Artist: Jan Johansen
- Songwriters: Håkan Almqvist; Bobby Ljunggren; Ingela "Pling" Forsman

Placement
- Final result: 3rd, 100 points

Participation chronology

Sweden was represented at the Eurovision Song Contest 1995 with the song "Se på mig", composed by Håkan Almqvist and Bobby Ljunggren, with lyrics by Ingela "Pling" Forsman, and performed by Jan Johansen. The Swedish participating broadcaster, Sveriges Television (SVT), selected its entry through Melodifestivalen 1995.

== Before Eurovision ==
=== Melodifestivalen 1995 ===
Melodifestivalen 1995 was the selection for the 35th song to represent Sweden at the Eurovision Song Contest. It was the 34th time that this system of picking a song had been used. 986 songs were submitted to Sveriges Television (SVT) for the competition.The final was held in the Malmö Musikteater in Malmö on 24 February 1995, presented by Pernilla Månsson Colt and broadcast on TV2 and Sveriges Radio's P3 and P4 networks. The show was watched by 3,646,000 people.

First Round – 24 February 1995
R/O	Artist	Song	Songwriter(s)	Result
1	Ulrika Bornemark and Göran Rudbo	"Jag tror på dig"	Dan Bornemark, Ulrika Bornemark	—N/a
2	Jessica Pilnäs	"Jag ger dig allt"	Christer Lundh, Mikael Wendt	Advanced
3	Paula Åkesdotter-Jarl	"Om du inte tror mig"	John Ekedahl	Advanced
4	Jan Johansen	"Se på mig"	Ingela 'Pling' Forsman, Bobby Ljunggren, Håkan Almqvist	Advanced
5	Björn Hedström	"Du är drömmen jag drömt"	Anders Börjesson	—N/a
6	Arvingarna	"Bo Diddley"	Lasse Holm, Gert Lengstrand	—N/a
7	Tina Leijonberg and Monica Silverstrand	"Himmel på vår jord"	Per Andréasson	—N/a
8	Nick Borgen	"Joanna"	Stephan Berg	—N/a
9	Cecilia Vennersten	"Det vackraste"	Nanne Grönvall, Maria Rådsten, Peter Grönvall	Advanced
10	Lasse Lindbom, Janne Bark, Michael Stolt and Simon Ådahl	"Följ dina drömmar"	Per Andréasson, Anders Dannvik	Advanced

Second Round – 24 February 1995
R/O	Artist	Song	Points	Place
1	Jessica Pilnäs	"Jag ger dig allt"	45	3
2	Paula Åkesdotter-Jarl	"Om du inte tror mig"	31	4
3	Jan Johansen	"Se på mig"	64	1
4	Cecilia Vennersten	"Det vackraste"	61	2
5	Lasse Lindbom, Janne Bark, Michael Stolt and Simon Ådahl	"Följ dina drömmar"	30	5

Detailed Regional Jury Voting
R/O	Song	Luleå	Örebro	Umeå	Norrköping	Falun	Karlstad	Sundsvall	Växjö	Stockholm	Gothenburg	Malmö	Total
1	"Jag ger dig allt"	6	6	4	4	2	8	2	6	2	1	4	45
2	"Om du inte tror mig"	1	4	1	1	8	4	1	1	6	2	2	31
3	"Se på mig"	8	8	6	2	6	6	6	4	4	8	6	64
4	"Det vackraste"	2	1	8	6	4	2	8	8	8	6	8	61
5	"Följ dina drömmar"	4	2	2	8	1	1	4	2	1	4	1	30

== At Eurovision ==
On the night of the contest Johansen performed 18th, following Cyprus and following Denmark. "Se på mig" finished in 3rd place with 100 points.

The contest was broadcast on TV2 (with commentary by Pernilla Månsson) and on radio stations SR P3 and SR P4 (both with commentary by Claes-Johan Larsson and Lisa Syrén).

=== Voting ===
Points awarded to Sweden
Score	Country
12 points	Denmark; Germany; Ireland
10 points	Poland
8 points	Austria; Norway; Portugal
7 points	
6 points	Russia; United Kingdom
5 points	
4 points	Cyprus; Iceland
3 points	France; Malta
2 points	Bosnia and Herzegovina
1 point	Slovenia; Turkey

Points awarded by Sweden
Score	Country
12 points	Denmark
10 points	Ireland
8 points	Cyprus
7 points	Slovenia
6 points	Iceland
5 points	United Kingdom
4 points	Austria
3 points	France
2 points	Israel
1 point	Malta
