= Cyprus in the Eurovision Song Contest 1995 =

- Eurovision Song Contest 1995
- Participating broadcaster: Cyprus Broadcasting Corporation (CyBC)
- Country: Cyprus
- Selection process: Epilogí Kypriakís Symmetoxís Sto Diagonismó Tragoudioú Giourovízion
- Selection date: 14 March 1995

Competing entry
- Song: "Sti fotia"
- Artist: Alexandros Panayi
- Songwriter: Alexandros Panayi

Placement
- Final result: 9th, 79 points

Participation chronology

Cyprus was represented at the Eurovision Song Contest 1995 with the song "Sti fotia", written and performed by Alexandros Panayi. The Cypriot participating broadcaster, the Cyprus Broadcasting Corporation (CyBC), selected its entry through a national final.

== Before Eurovision ==
=== Epilogí Kypriakís Symmetoxís Sto Diagonismó Tragoudioú Giourovízion ===
==== Competing entries ====
The Cyprus Broadcasting Corporation (CyBC) opened a submission period for songs. By the end of the submission period, 74 entries had been submitted. On 19 February 1995, in radio room one in the CyBC buildings, an 8-member jury listened to the received submissions and chose eight songs to compete in the national final. However, "Mia vrochi" was withdrawn before the final.

Chosen competing entries
Artist	Song	Songwriter(s)
Alexandros Panayi	"Sti fotia" (Στη φωτιά)	Alexandros Panayi
Andrea Aravi	"I poli" (Η πόλη)	Christakis Vlassios, Dimitris Vanezis
Bessy Argyraki	"Mia vrochi" (Μια βροχή)	Rodoulas Papalamprianou, Aristos Moschovakis
Kyros Lontos	"Taxidi makrino" (Ταξίδι μακρινό)	Kyros Lontos
Maria Kourou	"Kontra ston anemo" (Κόντρα στον άνεμο)	Alexis Meletiou, Maria Kourou
Maria Nicolaidou	"To telefteo fengari" (Το τελευταίο φεγγάρι)	Koralia Schiza, Ilias Antoniadis
Michalis Hatzigiannis	"Filise me" (Φίλησέ με)	Andreas Gerolemou
Michalis Hatzigiannis	"Gramma" (Γράμμα)	Giorgos Kallis, Leonidas Malenis

==== Final ====
The final was broadcast live at 21:15 ((EET)) on RIK 1 on 14 March 1995 in a show titled Epilogí Kypriakís Symmetoxís Sto Diagonismó Tragoudioú Giourovízion (Greek: Επιλογή Κυπριακής Συμμετοχής Στο Διαγωνισμό Τραγουδιού Γιουροβίζιον). The contest was held at the Monte Caputo Nightclub in Limassol, and was hosted by Giorgos Theofanous and Evridiki. The running order was decided by a random draw which was done in the presence of the songwriters of the competing entries on 23 February 1995. The winner was chosen by a 20-member jury, consisting of the same eight members who chose the competing entries and twelve other juries chosen by CyBC.

On 7 March 1995, "Mia vrochi", which was set to perform fourth, was withdrawn by its composer Aristos Moschovakis after CyBC refused his request to release the names of the 20-member jury. The names of the eight members of the jury who chose the competing entries were known to Moschovakis at the time, but the additional twelve for the final were not.

Final – 14 March 1995
R/O	Artist	Song	Points	Place
1	Andrea Aravi	"I poli" (Η πόλη)	78	6
2	Michalis Hatzigiannis	"Filise me" (Φίλησέ με)	129	3
3	Kyros Lontos	"Taxidi makrino" (Ταξίδι μακρινό)	80	5
4	Bessy Argyraki	"Mia vrochi" (Μια βροχή)	—N/a	
5	Alexandros Panayi	"Sti fotia" (Στη φωτιά)	157	1
6	Maria Kourou	"Kontra ston anemo" (Κόντρα στον άνεμο)	107	4
7	Maria Nicolaidou	"To telefteo fengari" (Το τελευταίο φεγγάρι)	78	7
8	Michalis Hatzigiannis	"Gramma" (Γράμμα)	131	2

== At Eurovision ==
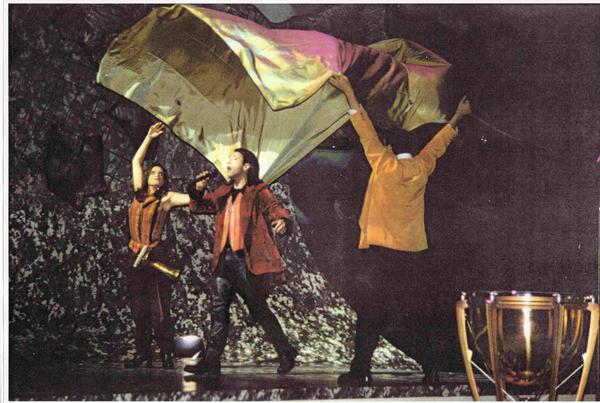
Alexandros Panayi performing during the Eurovision Song Contest 1995

On the night of the final, Alexandros Panayi performed seventeenth in the running order, following Portugal and preceding Sweden. At the closing of the voting, "Sti fotia" had received 79 points, placing Cyprus 9th out of 23 competing countries. The Cypriot jury awarded its 12 points to Greece.

The contest was broadcast on RIK 1, with commentary by Neofytos Taliotis.

=== Voting ===
Points awarded to Cyprus
Score	Country
12 points	Hungary
10 points	
8 points	Belgium; Greece; Sweden
7 points	
6 points	Israel
5 points	Denmark; Norway; Spain
4 points	Malta; Russia; Slovenia
3 points	Germany; United Kingdom
2 points	Iceland
1 point	Croatia; Poland

Points awarded by Cyprus
Score	Country
12 points	Greece
10 points	Spain
8 points	Israel
7 points	Norway
6 points	Malta
5 points	Croatia
4 points	Sweden
3 points	Slovenia
2 points	France
1 point	Russia
