= Iceland in the Eurovision Song Contest 1995 =

- Eurovision Song Contest 1995
- Participating broadcaster: Ríkisútvarpið (RÚV)
- Country: Iceland
- Selection process: Internal selection
- Announcement date: Artist: 8 December 1994; Song: 19 April 1995

Competing entry
- Song: "Núna"
- Artist: Bo Halldórsson
- Songwriters: Björgvin Halldórsson; Ed Welch; Jón Örn Marinósson

Placement
- Final result: 15th, 31 points

Participation chronology

Iceland was represented at the Eurovision Song Contest 1995 with the song "Núna", composed by Björgvin Halldórsson and Ed Welch, with lyrics by Jón Örn Marinósson, and performed by Halldórsson himself. The Icelandic participating broadcaster, Ríkisútvarpið (RÚV), internally selected its entry for the contest in December 1994. The entry was presented to the public on 19 April 1995 during the television programme Á tali hjá Hemma Gunn.

Iceland competed in the Eurovision Song Contest which took place on 13 May 1995. Performing during the show in position 7, Iceland placed fifteenth out of the 23 participating countries, scoring 31 points.

== Background ==
Prior to the 1995 contest, Ríkisútvarpið (RÚV) had participated in the Eurovision Song Contest representing Iceland nine times since its first entry in 1986. Its best placing in the contest to this point was fourth, achieved in 1990 with the song "Eitt lag enn" performed by Stjórnin. In 1994, it placed twelfth with the song "Nætur" performed by Sigga.

As part of its duties as participating broadcaster, RÚV organises the selection of its entry in the Eurovision Song Contest and broadcasts the event in the country. Since 1986, the broadcaster has used a national final to select their entry for the Eurovision Song Contest. For 1995, RÚV opted to internally select its entry for the first time.

== Before Eurovision ==
=== Internal selection ===
RÚV internally selected its entry for the Eurovision Song Contest 1995 in collaboration with music publisher Skífuna. On 8 December 1994, Björgvin Halldórsson was announced as the Icelandic representative. Halldórsson previously attempted to represent Iceland at the Eurovision Song Contest on multiple occasions by competing in their national finals between 1986 and 1990 as well as in 1992, among them which included a second place in 1986 with the song "Ef".

The song Bo Halldórsson would perform, "Núna", was presented to the public on 19 April 1995 during the television programme Á tali hjá Hemma Gunn, hosted by Hermann Gunnarsson. The song was composed by Halldórsson himself and Ed Welch with lyrics by Jón Örn Marinósson, and was selected by votes from two focus group, one consisting of music professionals and one consisting of members of the public, from more than 20 entries created by Halldórsson and composers invited by RÚV.

== At Eurovision ==
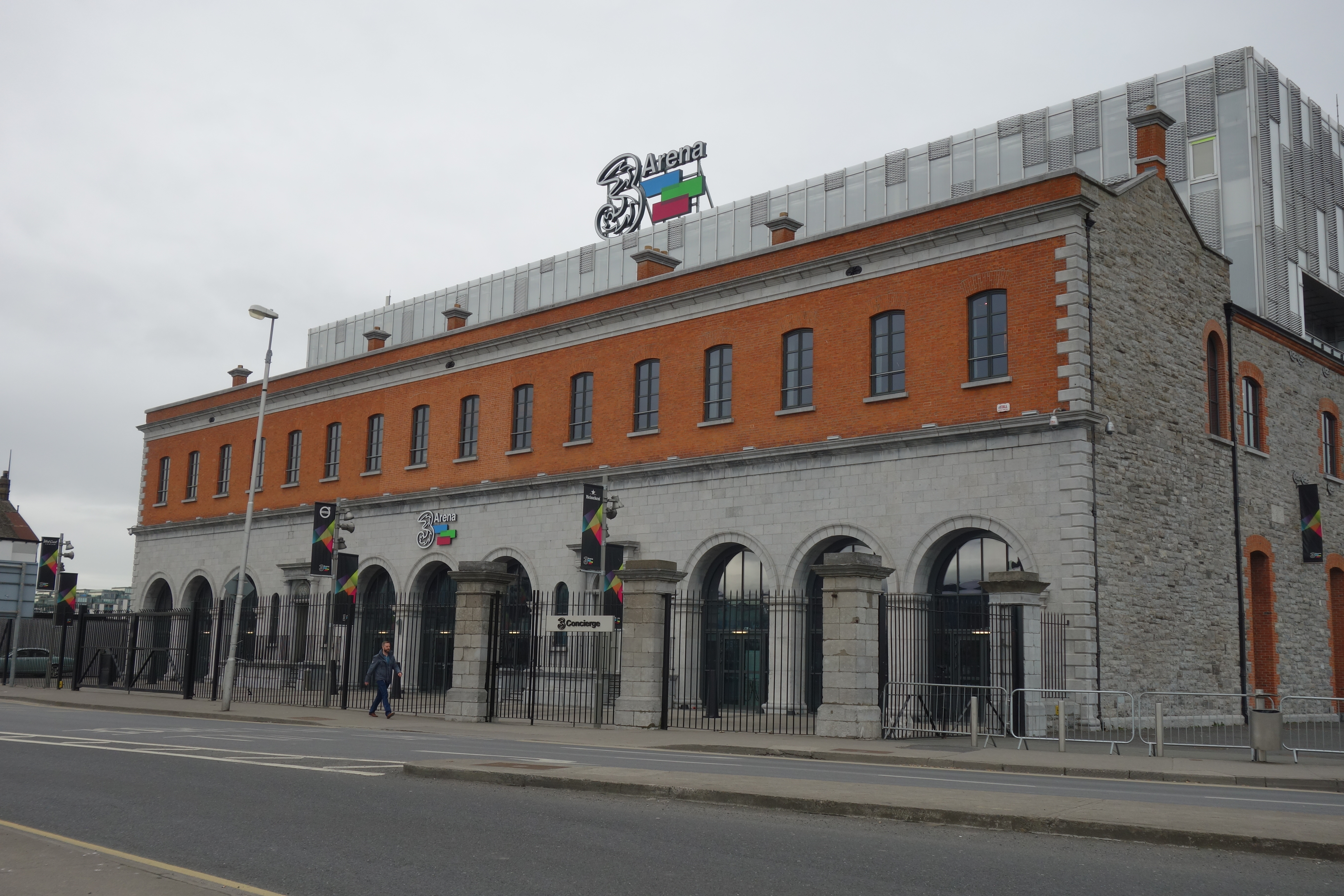
The Eurovision Song Contest 1995 took place at the Point Theatre in Dublin, Ireland, on 13 May 1995.

According to Eurovision rules, all nations with the exceptions of the bottom nine countries of the 1994 contest were permitted to compete in the final on 13 May 1995. Iceland was one of the top sixteen countries in the 1994 contest and thus was permitted to participate. On 9 December 1994, an allocation draw was held which determined the running order and Iceland was set to perform in position 7, following the entry from Russia and before the entry from Austria. The Icelandic conductor at the contest was Frank McNamara, and Iceland finished in fifteenth place with 31 points.

The contest was broadcast on Sjónvarpið, with commentary by Jakob Frímann Magnússon. RÚV appointed Áslaug Dóra Eyjólfsdóttir as its spokesperson to announce the Icelandic votes.

=== Voting ===
Below is a breakdown of points awarded to Iceland and awarded by Iceland in the contest. The nation awarded its 12 points to Norway in the contest.

Points awarded to Iceland
Score	Country
12 points	
10 points	
8 points	Denmark
7 points	
6 points	Ireland; Sweden
5 points	
4 points	Austria
3 points	Russia
2 points	France; Norway
1 point	

Points awarded by Iceland
Score	Country
12 points	Norway
10 points	Croatia
8 points	France
7 points	Denmark
6 points	Poland
5 points	Spain
4 points	Sweden
3 points	Ireland
2 points	Cyprus
1 point	Slovenia
