= Slovenia in the Eurovision Song Contest 1995 =

- Eurovision Song Contest 1995
- Participating broadcaster: Radiotelevizija Slovenija (RTVSLO)
- Country: Slovenia
- Selection process: Slovenska Popevka za Evrovizijo '95
- Selection date: 18 February 1995

Competing entry
- Song: "Prisluhni mi"
- Artist: Darja Švajger
- Songwriters: Primož Peterca; Sašo Fajon

Placement
- Final result: 7th, 84 points

Participation chronology

Slovenia was represented at the Eurovision Song Contest 1995 with the song "Prisluhni mi", written by Primož Peterca and Sašo Fajon, and performed by Darja Švajger. The Slovene participating broadcaster, Radiotelevizija Slovenija (RTVSLO), held a national final in order to select its entry for the contest.

== Before Eurovision ==
=== Slovenska Popevka za Evrovizijo '95 ===
Radiotelevizija Slovenija (RTVSLO) held a national final to select its entry for the Eurovision Song Contest 1995. RTVSLO opened a submission period for candidate songs, and by the end of the submission period, 47 entries had been submitted. An RTVSLO jury selected twelve entries from the submissions for the national final. Among the rejected entries was "Nisi, nisva" by Roberto, which appeared in 1996 national final.

The national final was held on 18 February 1995 at 20:10 CET, and was named "Slovenska Popevka za Evrovizijo '95" in TV guides and the show's title card. The contest was held in Studio 1 of RTVSLO in Ljubljana, and was hosted by Saša Gerdej. 1X Band performed their 1993 entry "Tih deževen dan" as an interval act. The results were decided by juries in twelve regional radio stations.

The national final is known to have been broadcast live on television on TV SLO 1 and on radio on Radio Val 202, then repeated on TV SLO 2 on the next day at 12:40 CET.

Final – 18 February 1995
R/O	Artist	Song	Songwriter(s)		Points	Place
R/O	Artist	Song	Composer(s)	Lyricist	Points	Place
1	Avia Band	"Vsaj še trenutek"	Matej Strah	Adi Smolar	120	3
2	Jan Plestenjak	"Ker te ljubim"	Jan Plestenjak		73	5
3	Miha Balažič	"Tvoje oči"	Tomaž Kozlevčar	Dare Hering	53	10
4	Freeway	"Joanna"	V. Denis	Sami	61	9
5	Don Juan	"Naj tvoja volja se zgodi"	Miran Fakin	Vili Bertok	72	6
6	Daniela Sasič and Mario Barišič	"Ne ti, ne jaz"	Izidor Leitinger	D. Leitinger	14	12
7	Darja Švajger	"Prisluhni mi"	Primož Peterca; Sašo Fajon	Primož Peterca	132	1
8	Irena Vrčkovnik and Oto Pestner	"Oda ljubezni"	Oto Pestner	Marjan Šneberger	122	2
9	Faraoni	"Ljubezen je"	Enzo Hrovatin	Miša Čermak	102	4
10	After Eight	"Edina ti"	Matej Kovše		69	7
11	Malibu	"Hvala ti"	Andrej Baša	Tomo Jurak	68	8
12	Čudežna polja	"Dober dan maj"	Gorazd Elvič		50	11

Detailed Radio Votes
R/O	Song	Radio Slovenija	Radio Maribor	Radio Koper	Radio Murski val	Radio Celje	Radio Trbovlje	Studio D	Radio Kranj	Koroški Radio	Radio Ptuj	Radio Šmarje pri Jelšah	Radio Ognjišče	Total
1	"Vsaj še trenutek"	12	10	8	11	10	10	10	11	8	8	12	10	120
2	"Ker te ljubim"	11	7	6	7	6	9	6	8	2	1	3	7	73
3	"Tvoje oči"	5	6	2	6	3	3	8	2	4	4	7	3	53
4	"Joanna"	6	8	9	5	4	4	1	4	9	3	6	2	61
5	"Naj tvoja volja se zgodi"	8	9	5	3	5	7	3	9	6	7	4	6	72
6	"Ne ti, ne jaz"	1	1	1	1	1	1	2	1	1	2	1	1	14
7	"Prisluhni mi"	10	12	11	12	12	11	11	12	12	9	9	11	132
8	"Oda ljubezni"	3	11	10	8	11	12	12	10	11	12	10	12	122
9	"Ljubezen je"	7	4	12	10	9	8	9	7	7	10	11	8	102
10	"Edina ti"	9	3	3	4	7	6	4	5	10	6	8	4	69
11	"Hvala ti"	4	2	7	9	8	5	5	6	3	5	5	9	68
12	"Dober dan maj"	2	5	4	2	2	2	7	3	5	11	2	5	50

== At Eurovision ==
On the night of the contest, Darja Švajger performed 20th in the running order, following Denmark and preceding Israel. At the close of voting she received 84 points, placing 7th in a field of 23. This was, and still is as of 2024, Slovenia's joint-best placing at the contest, shared with 2001 Slovenian entry, "Energy", performed by Nuša Derenda. The Slovene jury awarded its 12 points to Croatia.

The contest was broadcast on SLO 1 (with commentary by Damjana Golavšek) and on radio station Val 202.

=== Voting ===
Points awarded to Slovenia
Score	Country
12 points	
10 points	Greece; United Kingdom
8 points	Hungary; Ireland
7 points	Russia; Sweden
6 points	Bosnia and Herzegovina
5 points	Germany; Portugal
4 points	Poland
3 points	Austria; Cyprus; Israel
2 points	Croatia; Malta
1 point	Iceland

Points awarded by Slovenia
Score	Country
12 points	Croatia
10 points	Israel
8 points	France
7 points	Norway
6 points	Denmark
5 points	Ireland
4 points	Cyprus
3 points	Turkey
2 points	Greece
1 point	Sweden
