= Denmark in the Eurovision Song Contest 1995 =

- Eurovision Song Contest 1995
- Participating broadcaster: Danmarks Radio (DR)
- Country: Denmark
- Selection process: Dansk Melodi Grand Prix 1995
- Selection date: 25 March 1995

Competing entry
- Song: "Fra Mols til Skagen"
- Artist: Aud Wilken
- Songwriters: Lise Cabble; Mette Mathiesen

Placement
- Final result: 5th, 92 points

Participation chronology

Denmark was represented at the Eurovision Song Contest 1995 with the song "Fra Mols til Skagen", written by Lise Cabble and Mette Mathiesen, and performed by Aud Wilken. The Danish participating broadcaster, Danmarks Radio (DR), organised the Dansk Melodi Grand Prix 1995 in order to select its entry for the contest.

== Before Eurovision ==
=== Dansk Melodi Grand Prix 1995 ===
Danmarks Radio (DR) held the national final on 25 March 1995 at its television studios in Copenhagen, hosted by Sidsel Agensø and Gry la Cour. Eleven songs competed in the contest and the winner was selected by the votes of a five-member jury over two rounds. In the first round, the top five songs were selected to advance to the second round of voting, which led to the victory of Aud Wilken with the song "Fra Mols til Skagen" by a 2-point margin. Voting was extremely tight, with only 7 points separating the top five songs.

The show was watched by 1.1 million viewers in Denmark, making it the most popular show of the evening and second most popular show of the week.

The five-member jury consisted of Søs Fenger, Bent Fabricius-Bjerre, Dorte Hygum Sørensen, Sebastian, and Monica Krog-Meyer.

First Round – 25 March 1995
R/O	Artist	Song	Songwriter(s)	Result
1	Johnny Jørgensen	"Hvis du bli'r ved"	Morten Remar	—N/a
2	Aud Wilken	"Fra Mols til Skagen"	Lise Cabble, Mette Mathiesen	Advanced
3	Jacob Launbjerg	"Vi ses en dag"	Jascha Richter, Jacob Launbjerg	—N/a
4	Misen Larsen	"Stille krig"	Michael Bruun, Anne Dorte Michelsen	—N/a
5	Ulla Henningsen	"Du kysser som en drøm"	Anne Linnet	Advanced
6	Søren Launbjerg	"Venter det bedste"	Jan Rørdam, Alberte Winding	—N/a
7	Master Fatman	"Jordisk kærlighed"	Peter Biker, Elisabeth Gjerluff Nielsen	Advanced
8	Channe Nussbaum	"Det blev os alligevel"	Klaus Kjellerup, Anne Dorte Michelsen	—N/a
9	Lars Muhl	"Europa"	Lars Muhl	Advanced
10	Veronica Mortensen	"Ingen gør mig ensom helt som dig"	Elisabeth Gjerluff Nielsen	Advanced
11	Mads Nørregård	"Det dybe stille wand"	Morten Kærså, Mads Nørregård	—N/a

Second Round – 25 March 1995
R/O	Artist	Song	S. Fenger	B. Fabricius-Bjerre	D. Hygum Sørensen	Sebastian	M. Krog-Meyer	Total	Place
1	Aud Wilken	"Fra Mols til Skagen"	12	10	12	6	6	46	1
2	Ulla Henningsen	"Du kysser som en drøm"	5	12	6	12	8	43	3
3	Master Fatman	"Jordisk kærlighed"	10	8	8	5	10	41	4
4	Lars Muhl	"Europa"	8	7	7	10	12	44	2
5	Veronica Mortensen	"Ingen gør mig ensom helt som dig"	8	6	10	8	7	39	5

== At Eurovision ==
Pre-contest betting rated "Fra Mols til Skagen" among the favourites for victory. On the night of the final Wilken performed 19th in the running order, and at the close of voting "Fra Mols til Skagen" had received 92 points with maximum points from Norway and Sweden, placing Denmark 5th of the 23 entries, the country's best placement in the 1990s. The Danish jury awarded its 12 points to Sweden.

The contest was broadcast on DR TV and on radio station DR P3, with commentary by Jørgen de Mylius. The contest was watched by a total of 1.5 million viewers in Denmark.

=== Voting ===
Points awarded to Denmark
Score	Country
12 points	Norway; Sweden
10 points	Russia
8 points	
7 points	Austria; Germany; Iceland; Ireland
6 points	Portugal; Slovenia; Turkey
5 points	
4 points	
3 points	Belgium; Bosnia and Herzegovina; Hungary; Poland
2 points	
1 point	

Points awarded by Denmark
Score	Country
12 points	Sweden
10 points	Austria
8 points	Iceland
7 points	United Kingdom
6 points	France
5 points	Cyprus
4 points	Malta
3 points	Bosnia and Herzegovina
2 points	Norway
1 point	Ireland
