= Serenella Andrade =

Portuguese journalist

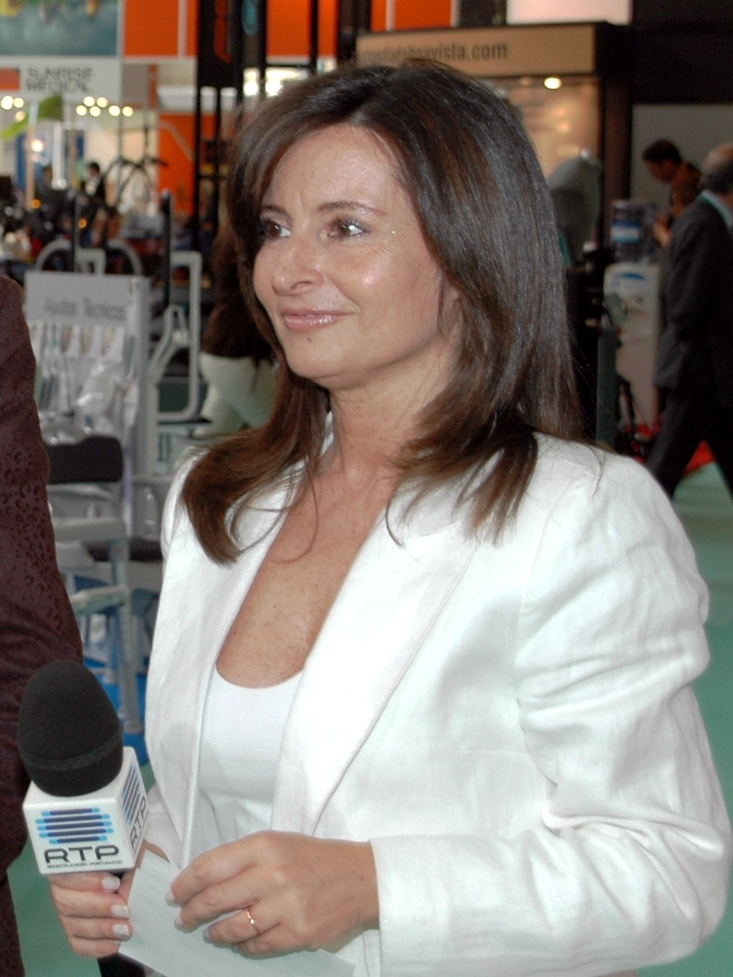
- Born: 18 September 1962 (age 63); Naples, Italy
- Occupations: Television presenter, journalist
- Children: 3

Serenella Andrade (born 18 September 1962 in Naples, Italy) is a Portuguese journalist and television presenter.

She is the daughter of the director and former opera singer Luís Andrade, Andrade presented the Jogos sem Fronteiras for several years, along with Eládio Clímaco.

She presented the competition "SMS" and the program A Hora da Sorte (The Hour of Luck) on the RTP that includes the extraction of lottery numbers from Santa Casa de Misericórdia lottery.

Andrade lives in Lisbon, is married and has three children.

== Filmography ==
- 1991 - Jogo de Cartas
- 1995 - 1997 - Casa Cheia
- 1997 - Casa de Artistas
- 1998 - Obrigado Por Tudo
- 1998 - 1999 - Santa Casa
- 2001 - Fim de Ano 2001
- 2001 - Made in Portugal
- 2003 - SMS - Ser Mais Sabedor
- 2003 - Domingo é Domingo
- 2005 - Falas do Coração
- 2006 - 2014 - A Hora da Sorte
- 2007 - Portugal Azul
- 2007 - 2014 - Verão Total
- 2014/2015 - Casamentos de Santo António (reporter)
- 2014 - Fatura da Sorte
- 2014/2015 - Agora Nós (reporter)
- 2014/2015 - 5 km EDP - Corrida da Mulher
