= Dreamcatcher (Secret Garden album) =

Greatest hits album by Secret Garden
- Released: 22 May 2001
- Recorded: Windmill Lane Studios (Dublin, Ireland); Capri Digital Studio (Capri, Italy); Air Studio (London, England); Puk Studio (Kierby, Denmark); Cross Studio (Kristiansand, Norway); Syrland Studio (Reykjavik, Iceland); Ambience Studio (Oslo, Norway); Rainbow Studio (Oslo, Norway); Major Studio (Oslo, Norway); Omega Studio (Washington DC, USA)
- Genre: New-age
- Length: 72:36
- Label: Philips Records
- Producer: Rolf Løvland

Secret Garden chronology
Dawn of a New Century (1999)	Dreamcatcher (2001)	Once in a Red Moon (2002)

Dreamcatcher is a greatest hits package released in the United Kingdom in 2000 by Secret Garden, an Irish-Norwegian duo consisting of Irish violinist Fionnuala Sherry and Norwegian composer/pianist Rolf Løvland. A version with an alternative track listing was released on 22 May 2001 in the United States, and a special Australian tour edition in 2004.

The opening track Nocturne is a mostly instrumental song that won the Eurovision Song Contest in 1995. The album cover features a recoloured photograph of the Eilean Donan castle.

== Reception ==
In 2001, the album reached number 4 on the Billboard New Age chart. The Australian tour edition released in 2004 topped the classical music chart in that country and made the top 50 of the album charts in March 2004.

== Track listing ==
Releases in different countries differed slightly in the included tracks.

=== UK version (2000) ===
The 2000 United Kingdom version included:

1. "Nocturne" (3:11)
2. "Prayer" (4:30)
3. "Moving" (3:22)
4. "Dreamcatcher" (4:35)
5. "Sigma" (3:05)
6. "Song from a Secret Garden" (3:32)
7. "Sona" (4:16)
8. "Passacaglia" (3:47)
9. "Elan" (3:08)
10. "In Our Tears" (4:36)
11. "Celebration" (3:57)
12. "Heartstrings" (3:22)
13. "Steps" (4:01)
14. "Adagio" (2:51)
15. "The Rap" (2:31)
16. "Hymn to Hope" (4:18)
17. "Lore of the Loom" (3:17)
18. "Dawn of a New Century" (6:08)

=== US version (2001) ===
The track listing on the version released in the US 2001 is:

1. "Nocturne" (3:14)
2. "Prayer" (4:36)
3. "Moving" (3:22)
4. "Dreamcatcher" (4:41)
5. "Sigma" (3:07)
6. "Song from a Secret Garden" (3:33)
7. "Sona" (4:21)
8. "Passacaglia" (3:46)
9. "Elan" (3:12)
10. "In Our Tears" (4:39)
11. "Celebration" (3:56))
12. "Heartstrings" (3:23)
13. "Steps" (4:02)
14. "Adagio" (2:53)
15. "The Rap" (2:34)
16. "Hymn to Hope" (4:20)
17. "Lore of the Loom" (3:21)
18. "Dawn of a New Century" (6:12)
19. "Last Present" (3:24)

=== Australian version (2004) ===
The track listing on the 2004 Australian version is:

1. "Nocturne"
2. "Prayer"
3. "Moving"
4. "Dreamcatcher"
5. "Sigma"
6. "Song from a Secret Garden"
7. "Sona"
8. "Passacaglia"
9. "Elan"
10. "In Our Tears"
11. "Windancer"
12. "The Rap"
13. "You Raise Me Up"
14. "Heartstrings"
15. "Greenwaves"
16. "Papillon"
17. "Escape"
18. "Divertimento"
19. "Illumination"
20. "I Know a Rose Tree"

== Charts ==
Chart (2004)	Peak position
Australian Albums (ARIA)	40
