= White Stones =

Studio album by Secret Garden
- Released: 15 April 1997
- Genre: New-age
- Length: 56:17
- Label: Mercury; Philips; PolyGram
- Producer: Rolf Lovland

Secret Garden chronology
Songs from a Secret Garden (1996)	White Stones (1997)	Dawn of a New Century (1999)

White Stones is the second studio album by Secret Garden. It was released on 15 April 1997 by Mercury, PolyGram, and Philips.

Professional ratings
Review scores
Source	Rating
Allmusic	4.5/5 stars

== Track listing ==
No.	Title	Length
1.	"Steps"	4:03
2.	"Poéme"	5:00
3.	"Hymn to Hope"	4:20
4.	"Moving"	3:23
5.	"First Day of Spring"	4:46
6.	"Passacaglia"	3:47
7.	"Reflection"	3:02
8.	"Windancer"	3:43
9.	"Appassionata"	4:27
10.	"Escape"	3:36
11.	"Sanctuary"	4:21
12.	"Celebration"	3:58
13.	"Home"	3:25
14.	"Illumination"	4:16

== Personnel ==
- Violin – Fionnuala Sherry
- Keyboards, Piano & Conductor of the Irish National Chamber Choir – Rolf Løvland
- Guitar – Des Moore
- Keyboards – Bjørn Ole Rasch
- Bass – Eoghan O'Neill
- Drums – Robbie Casserly
- Orchestral percussion – Joakim Nordin
- Choir – Irish National Chamber Choir
- Orchestra – RTÉ Concert Orchestra
- Conductor (RTÉ Concert Orchestra) – Fiachra Trench
- Orchestra Leader – Michael D'Arcy

== Credits ==
- Additional assistant recording engineers – Alessandro Benedetti, Jan Erik Kongshaug, Nick Friend & Ronny Talsaete
- Assistant recording engineers & mixing – Conan Doyle & Jonathan Ford
- Pre-production Co-engineer & sound samples – Alf Emil Eik
- Mastering – Greg Calbi
- Composer, arranger & producer – Rolf Løvland
- Photography – Dorothy Low
- Recorded By, Mixed By, Co-producer – Andrew Boland
- Orchestral score – Fiachra Trench (tracks: 4–5 & 10), John Tate (tracks: 1–2, 6, 8–9, 11–12 & 14), Rolf Løvland (tracks: 3 & 7)

== Notes ==
- Recorded and mixed in Windmill Lane Studios, Dublin Ireland.
- Additional recording made in Capri Digital Studio, Italy and Rainbow Studio, Oslo Norway.
- Pre-production and additional recording made in Cross Studio, Kristiansand Norway.
- Masterted at Masterdisk, New York City, U.S.A.
- White Stones is dedicated to the memory of our fathers Ben Sherry and Sigurd Lovland.
- Mercury Records is a PolyGram company

℗ & © 1995 PolyGram A/S Norway
