= Inside I'm Singing =

Studio album by Secret Garden
- Released: 26 November 2007
- Genre: New-age
- Label: Universal

Secret Garden chronology
Earthsongs (2005)	Inside I'm Singing (2007)	Winter Poem (2011)

Professional ratings
Review scores
Source	Rating
Allmusic	3/5 stars

Inside I'm Singing is the ninth studio album by Secret Garden. It was released on 26 November 2007 by Universal. Unlike previous albums, Inside I'm Singing is mostly composed of vocal music. Instrumental tracks given new lyrics.

The first track, "Nocturne", won the Eurovision Contest in 1995 and also appeared on the first album Songs from a Secret Garden.

"Theme from the Mermaid Chair" was featured in the 2005 TV movie The Mermaid Chair.

"You Raise Me Up", a popular song by Secret Garden, appeared first on Once in a Red Moon with guest vocals by Westlife and Brian Kennedy who also did the same work on this album.

== Track listing ==
No.	Title	Guest Vocals	Length
1.	"Nocturne"	Anne Takle	3:44
2.	"Thank You"	Peter Jöback	4:25
3.	"The Things You Are to Me"	Elaine Paige	4:42
4.	"If Came the Hour"	Tommy Körberg	4:30
5.	"Theme from the Mermaid Chair"	Instrumental	3:39
6.	"Sometimes a Prayer Will Do"	Tracey Campbell	4:50
7.	"Song for a Stormy Night"	Steinar Albrigtsen	4:16
8.	"I've Dreamed of You"	Barbra Streisand	4:54
9.	"Did I Not Love You"	Peter Corry	3:45
10.	"Simply You"	Niamh Kavanagh	4:28
11.	"My Land"	Espen Grjotheim	4:51
12.	"Sortie"	Instrumental	3:35
13.	"You Raise Me Up"	Westlife	4:02

== Charts ==
Chart performance for Inside I'm Singing
Chart (2007–2009)	Peak position
Australian Albums (ARIA)	92
Norwegian Albums (VG-lista)	1
