= Songs from a Secret Garden =

Studio album by Secret Garden
- Released: 16 April 1996
- Genres: New-age, neoclassical new-age music
- Length: 43:20
- Labels: Mercury; Philips; PolyGram
- Producer: Rolf Løvland

Secret Garden chronology
Songs from a Secret Garden (1996)	White Stones (1997)

Songs from a Secret Garden is the first international studio album by Secret Garden. It was released on 16 April 1996 by Mercury, PolyGram, and Philips. It includes the Norwegian winning song of the Eurovision Song Contest 1995, "Nocturne".

Professional ratings
Review scores
Source	Rating
Allmusic	4/5 stars
Sputnikmusic	4.3/5 stars

== Reception ==
The Allmusic reviewer Carol Wright awarded the album 4 stars, and it achieved platinum awards in Norway and South Korea. It stayed on the Billboard New Age chart for 101 weeks.

The track "Song from a Secret Garden" became famous in Korea by being featured in the drama 젊은이의 양지 (which means "Sunny Spots (or Places) of the Young") in 1995 and was also used in the 2018 Italian drama film Vittima della mia libertà ("Victim of my freedom") by Davide Guida. Another track from the album, "Adagio", was featured in the 2004 Wong Kar-wai film 2046. Another 1997 Hong Kong ATV drama 天長地久("Fated Love") also featured several tracks from this album, including "Song from a Secret Garden", "Adagio", "Serenade to Spring" and "Papillon".

The title track was covered by Greek melodic death metal band Nightrage in 2019 and included as a Japanese bonus track on Wolf to Man.

== Track listing ==
All songs and arrangements by Rolf Løvland, except where noted

No.	Title	Length
1.	"Nocturne" (lyrics by Petter Skavlan)	3:11
2.	"Pastorale"	3:47
3.	"Song from a Secret Garden"	3:32
4.	"Sigma" (lyrics by David Agnew)	3:05
5.	"Papillon"	3:22
6.	"Serenade to Spring"	3:12
7.	"Atlantia"	2:56
8.	"Heartstrings"	3:22
9.	"Adagio"	2:51
10.	"The Rap"	2:31
11.	"Chaconne"	3:25
12.	"Cantoluna"	3:29
13.	"Ode to Simplicity"	3:53

== In Korea ==
In Korea, "Serenade to Spring" was given a lyric and is sung under the name of "10월의 어느 멋진 날에" which means "One Fine Day in October". A popular baritone in Korea, Kim Dong-kyu sang the song on TV and a few professional singers sung in duo.

== Republish ==
In December 2010, Universal Music Group started to publish this album again in K2HD CD format by technology of K2HD by JVC. Since 100 kHz 24bit sound signal is processed during remastering by K2HD technology, high frequency is highlighted, especially in the better sound quality of violin.

== Remaster ==
A remastered version of the album was released in 2025 to mark the album's 30th anniversary. The remastered version includes a Norwegian version of Nocturne as a 14th track.

== Music video ==
In February 6, 2026, a music video of "Song from a Secret Garden" was released in the official YouTube channel of Secret Garden, taping in Ninh Bình province, Vietnam.

== Personnel ==
- Fionnuala Sherry – Violin
- Rolf Løvland – Piano & keyboards
- Des Moore – Guitar & mandolin
- Andrea Marlish – Harp
- Bjørn Ole Rasch & Jon Kjell Seljeseth – Additional keyboards
- Davy Spillane – Bagpipes (Uilleann pipe) & low whistle (tracks: 2, 4, 7, 10 & 11)
- Hans Fredrik Jacobsen – Whistle & Norwegian whistle (tracks: 1, 6, 7 & 10)
- Asa Jinder – Keyfiddle & keyharp (tracks: 1, 7 & 10)
- David Agnew – Oboe, English Horn (tracks: 3, 9 & 11)
- Rhonan Sugrue – Soprano Vocals (boy) (track: 4)
- Gunnhild Tvinnereim – Vocals (track: 1)
- Deirdre Brady – Flute (track: 5)
- Jean Lechmar – Clarinet (track: 12)
- Noel Eccles – Percussion (track: 10)
- Irish National Chamber Choir – Choir (track: 4)
- RTÉ Concert Orchestra – Orchestra

== Credits ==
- Scott Townsend – Cover design
- Conal Markey & Conan Doyle – Assistant engineer
- Andrew Boland – Recording engineer
- Oskar P. Sveinsson – Recording engineer & mixing
- David Agnew (track: 4) & Petter Skavlan (track: 1) – Lyrics
- Erik Avnskog & Jan Erik Kongshaug – Mixing
- John Tate – Additional Orchestra Conductor
- Mick Hales – Cover photography – Mick Hales
- Rolf Løvland – Producer, arranger, conductor & mixing

== Notes ==
℗ 1995 PolyGram A/S Norway

== Charts ==
=== Weekly charts ===
Chart (1995)	Peak position
Australian Albums (ARIA)	64
Belgian Albums (Ultratop Flanders)	17
Dutch Albums (Album Top 100)	42
New Zealand Albums (RMNZ)	31
Norwegian Albums (VG-lista)	1

=== Year-end charts ===
Chart (1995)	Position
Belgian Albums (Ultratop Flanders)	82

== Certifications ==
Region	Certification	Certified units/sales
Belgium (BRMA)	Gold	25,000^{*}
Norway (IFPI Norway)	Platinum	50,000^{*}
^{*} Sales figures based on certification alone.
