= Anna Shcherbakova =

Russian figure skater (born 2004)

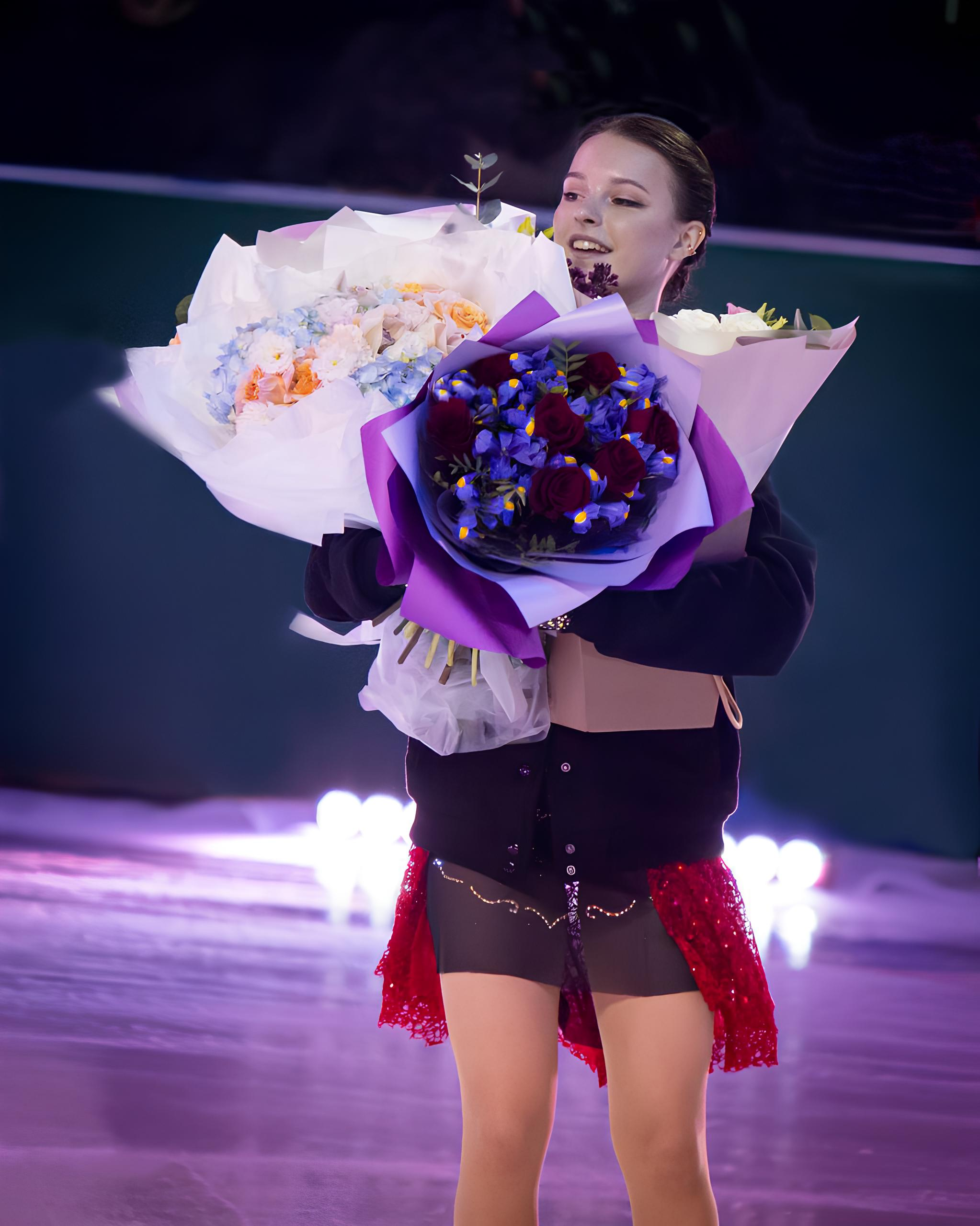
- Anna Shcherbakova in 2023

Personal information
- Native name: Анна Станиславовна Щербакова (Russian)
- Full name: Anna Stanislavovna Shcherbakova
- Born: 28 March 2004 (age 22) Moscow, Russia
- Height: 1.59 m (5 ft 3 in)

Figure skating career
- Country: Russia
- Discipline: Women's singles
- Coach: Eteri Tutberidze; Sergei Dudakov; Daniil Gleikhengauz
- Skating club: Sambo 70 (Khrustalny)
- Began skating: 2007
- Highest WS: 1st (2020–2022)

Medal record
Event	Gold medal – first place	Silver medal – second place	Bronze medal – third place
Olympic Games	1	0	0
World Championships	1	0	0
European Championships	1	1	0
Grand Prix Final	0	1	0
Russian Championships	3	1	0
World Team Trophy	1	0	0
World Junior Championships	0	1	0
Medal list
representing Russia, FSR & ROC
Olympic Games
Gold medal – first place	2022 Beijing	Singles
World Championships
Gold medal – first place	2021 Stockholm	Singles
European Championships
Gold medal – first place	2022 Tallinn	Singles
Silver medal – second place	2020 Graz	Singles
Grand Prix Final
Silver medal – second place	2019–20 Torino	Singles
Russian Championships
Gold medal – first place	2019 Saransk	Singles
Gold medal – first place	2020 Krasnoyarsk	Singles
Gold medal – first place	2021 Chelyabinsk	Singles
Silver medal – second place	2022 Saint Petersburg	Singles
World Team Trophy
Gold medal – first place	2021 Osaka	Team
World Junior Championships
Silver medal – second place	2019 Zagreb	Singles

Anna Stanislavovna Shcherbakova (Russian: Анна Станиславовна Щербакова; born 28 March 2004) is a Russian figure skater. She is the 2022 Olympic champion in women's singles, the 2021 World champion, the 2022 European champion, and a three-time Russian national champion (2019–2021).

Shcherbakova was the first female figure skater to land a quad Lutz in senior competition and the first woman to land two quad Lutz jumps in a single program. She was also the first to land a quad flip in combination with a triple jump, as well as the first to land two quad flips in one program. She remains the only Olympic champion in women's singles to have performed quad jumps in their winning programs.

Shcherbakova is also the 2020 European silver medalist, the 2019–20 Grand Prix Final silver medalist, the 2019 Skate America champion, the 2019 Cup of China champion, the 2021 Internationaux de France champion, the 2021 Gran Premio d'Italia champion, the 2019 CS Lombardia Trophy champion, the 2021 Budapest Trophy silver medalist, and the 2022 Russian national silver medalist. At the junior level, Shcherbakova was the 2019 World Junior silver medalist, the 2018 JGP Slovakia champion, the 2018 JGP Canada champion, the 2019 European Youth Olympic Winter Festival champion, and the 2019 Russian junior national bronze medalist.

== Early life ==
Anna Shcherbakova was born on 28 March 2004 in Moscow, Russia. Her father is a physicist and programmer, and her mother, Yulia, is a geologist-crystallographer. Her great-grandfather, Prokhor Shcherbakov, was a statesman of the Mari Autonomous Soviet Socialist Republic. She has an older sister, Inna, and a younger sister, Yana. Shcherbakova's parents signed Inna and Anna up for skating lessons to keep them active. As a child, Shcherbakova was also enrolled in drawing, swimming, and music classes and took tennis lessons. Shcherbakova is fluent in English and also studied German.

== Competitive skating career ==
=== Early career ===
Shcherbakova began skating at age three in 2007 with her first coach Oksana Bulycheva at the Khrustalnyi rink of the Olympic Reserve Sports School No. 37 (later absorbed into the "Sambo 70" sports school) in Moscow. Bulycheva would later describe Shcherbakova as a highly motivated skater who was advanced for her age. She parted ways with Bulycheva in November 2013 at age nine and began training in the elite group at the same rink, led by Eteri Tutberidze and Sergei Dudakov. In a 2020 interview, Shcherbakova shared that after joining Tutberidze's group, she stopped viewing skating as just a hobby and took her training more seriously. In mid-July 2017, when she was 13, Shcherbakova broke her leg while performing a triple loop at a training camp. As a result of the accident she missed most of the 2017–18 season, including her planned Junior Grand Prix debut. She did recover enough to compete at the 2018 Russian Figure Skating Championships where she finished 13th at the Junior level and 5th at the 2018 Russian Youth Championships – Elder Age level. This injury would continue to affect her knees throughout the course of her career.

=== Junior career ===
==== 2017–2018 season ====
Shcherbakova returned to competition in January 2018 at the 2018 Russian Junior Championships, finishing thirteenth with a total score of 179.19. Then in February, she improved her total score by over 30 points at the 2017–18 Russian Cup Final to win the gold medal in the junior category.

==== 2018–2019 season: International debut ====
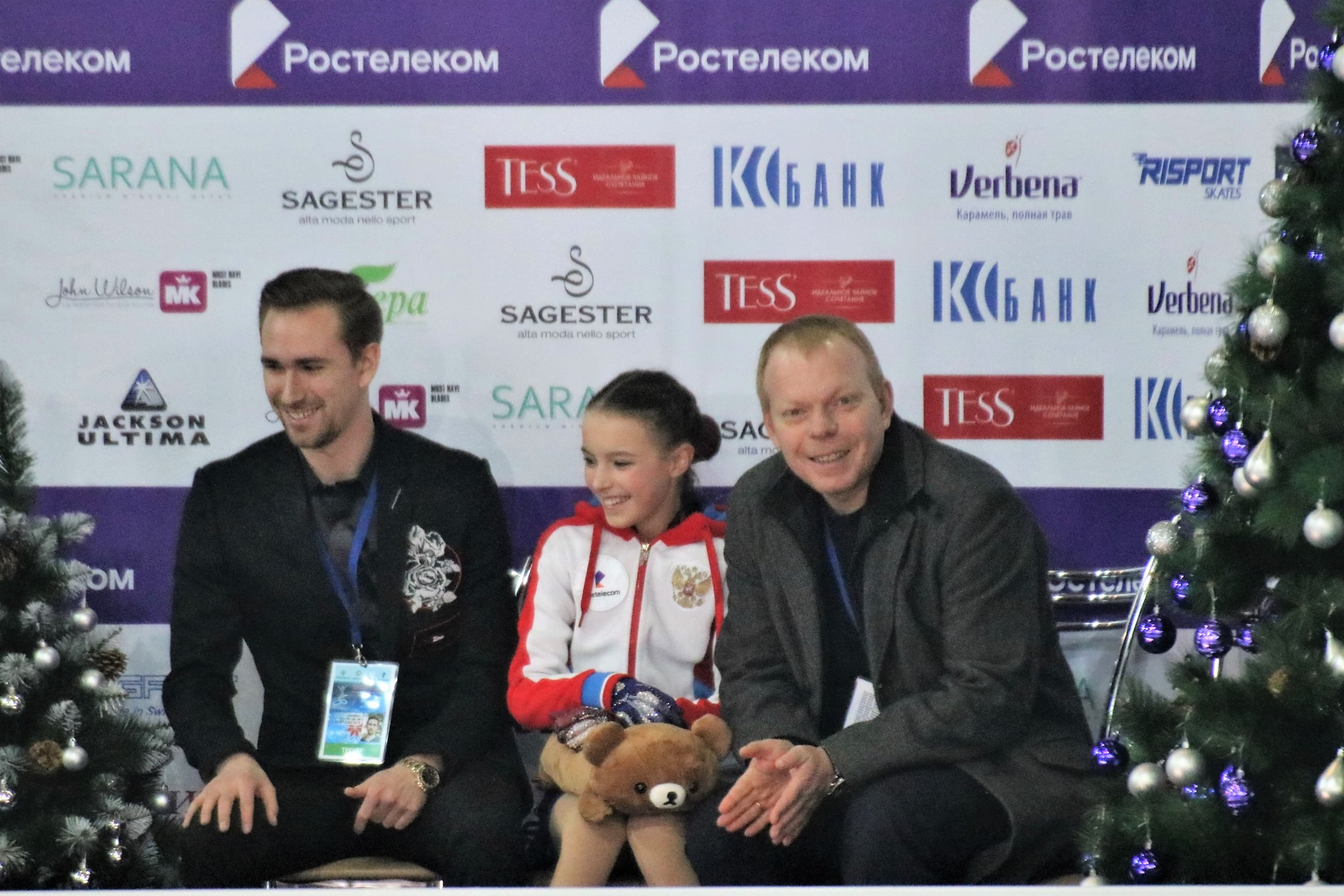
Shcherbakova (center) with coaches Sergei Dudakov and Daniil Gleikhengauz at the 2019 Russian Championships

Shcherbakova debuted internationally on the Junior Grand Prix circuit in August. She was assigned to events in Slovakia and Canada. At the 2018 JGP Slovakia, she placed first in both the short program and free skate, winning the gold medal by a margin of over 18 points over the silver medalist and fellow Russian competitor Anna Tarusina. At the time, her scores at the competition were the highest achieved in an international women's competition under the new +5/-5 GOE System. (Note: This was at the beginning of the 2018–19 season. Due to a change in how scores are calculated, scores in the 2018–19 season and after are not comparable to those from earlier seasons, which are termed "historical". Thus, Shcherbakova's scores set the new world record.) Her short program and combined total records were surpassed later in the Junior Grand Prix season by Alexandra Trusova, and the free program record was surpassed by Alena Kostornaia.

At the 2018 JGP Canada, Shcherbakova once again placed first in both the short program and free skate and won the gold medal by a margin of five points over the silver medalist, Anastasia Tarakanova. With two gold medals on the Junior Grand Prix, she qualified for the 2018–19 Junior Grand Prix Final. In October, Shcherbakova competed at the 2nd stage of the 2018 Russian Cup and became the first woman skater to land a quad Lutz at a domestic event. At the Junior Grand Prix Final in December, Shcherbakova placed sixth in the short program and fifth in the free skate, resulting in fifth place overall. Later in December 2018, at the 2019 Russian Championships, she once again landed the quad Lutz and won the gold medal with a total score of 229.78. At 14 years and seven months old, she became the third-youngest Russian women's singles champion in history. Despite winning the Russian title, she was too young to compete in the European Championships or World Championships of that season, both of which required participants to have turned 15 before 1 July 2018.

Shcherbakova then competed at the 2019 Russian Junior National Championships. After placing second in the short program and third in the free skate, she won the bronze medal. Next, she competed at the 2019 European Youth Olympic Festival in Sarajevo and won the gold medal nearly thirty points ahead of silver medalist Lucrezia Beccari. Shcherbakova was selected by the Russian Figure Skating Federation to compete at the 2019 Junior World Championships in Zagreb, Croatia. She scored 72.86 in the short program and 147.08 in the free skate and won the silver medal behind teammate Trusova.

=== Senior career ===
==== 2019–2020 season: Senior international debut ====
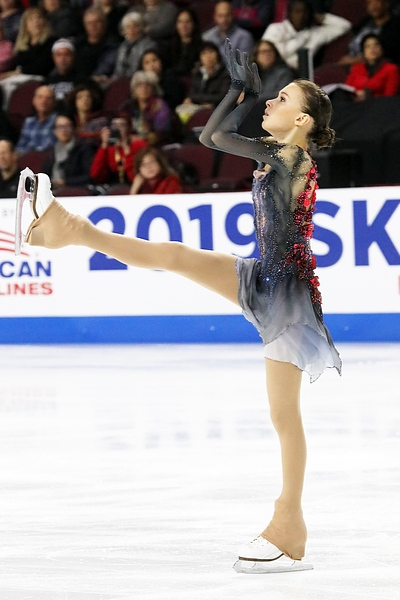
Shcherbakova competing in her short program at the 2019 Skate America

In September, Shcherbakova entered her first international senior competition in Italy at the ISU Challenger Series event, the 2019 Lombardia Trophy. After the short program, she was in third place behind Elizaveta Tuktamysheva and You Young. In the free program, she became the first senior woman to land a quad Lutz in senior competition, ensuring the gold medal in her senior debut. Her free program featured a costume change when the music switches from Gnossiennes No. 1 to The Firebird.

Shcherbakova made her ISU Grand Prix debut at the 2019 Skate America, where she won the gold medal after placing fourth in the short program and first in the free skate. At the competition, she became the first woman to land two quadruple Lutz jumps in the free skate in an international competition and the first woman to land a quadruple Lutz-triple jump combination (quad Lutz-triple toe loop) in an international competition. In the free skate, she became the second woman to achieve a score above 160 points under the current GOE system when she scored her personal best score of 160.16 points. Shcherbakova also set new records for the highest valued single jump, earning 14.79 points for her quadruple Lutz, and for the highest valued jump combinations, when she earned 18.66 points for her quad Lutz-triple toe loop combination. Shcherbakova also won her second event, the 2019 Cup of China, by a 14.86-point margin and qualified for the Grand Prix Final in Turin.

At the Grand Prix Final, Shcherbakova placed third in the short program behind teammates Alena Kostornaia and Alina Zagitova. In the free skate, she landed two quad Lutz and attempted for the first time, but fell on, the quad flip. She nevertheless placed first in the free skate and won the silver medal behind Kostornaia. Then at the 2020 Russian Championships, she skated cleanly to place second in the short program behind Kostornaia, who was ten points ahead going into the free skate. Shcherbakova won the free skate, landing two quad Lutzes and the quad flip for the first time, and won her second national title by just under two points overall.

Shcherbakova competed at the 2020 European Championships, delivering a clean short program skate to place second. In the free skate, Shcherbakova landed the quad Lutz-triple toe loop combination to start, followed by a quad flip. However, she fell on the second quad Lutz. Despite the fall, she placed first in the free skate and won the silver medal behind Kostornaia. Together with Kostornaia and Trusova, who took the bronze, the trio made for an all-Russian podium in the women's singles event. They were assigned to compete at the World Championships in Montreal, but the event was cancelled due to the COVID-19 pandemic.

==== 2020–2021 season: World champion ====
Shcherbakova debuted both of her programs at the Russian senior test skates with only one fall on her quad Lutz attempt in the free program, which she called "a good starting point". Due to the COVID-19 pandemic and the lack of international competitions, all Russian skaters were required to compete in the 2020–21 Russian Cup series in order to qualify for the 2021 Russian Championships. Shcherbakova won the first stage in Syzran with a score of 246.40 and the third stage in Sochi with 239.91 points. She was assigned, as with other prominent Russian skaters, to the 2020 Rostelecom Cup after the ISU decided to base the Grand Prix primarily on geographic location due to the COVID-19 pandemic. However, she withdrew on the day of the event due to illness, later revealed to be pneumonia.

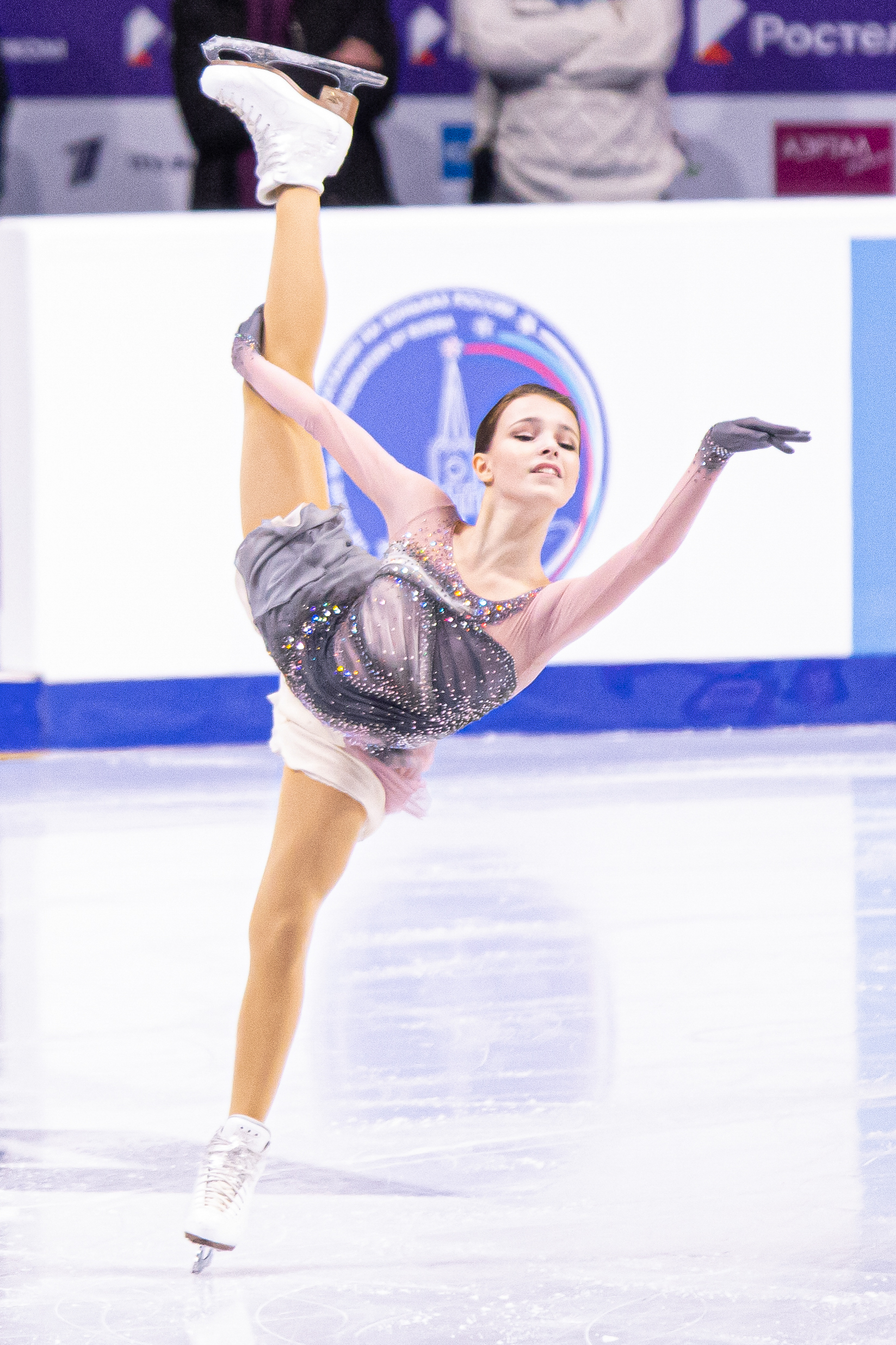
Shcherbakova performing her free skate at the 2021 Russian Championships

Shcherbakova had limited ability to train in advance of the 2021 Russian Championships due to pneumonia. She decided to compete in the event against her coaches' recommendation for her to withdraw. She won both the short program and the free skate and successfully landed both a quad Lutz and quad flip. She won the national title with a total score of 264.10, ahead of Kamila Valieva and Trusova. Her free skate was praised by the Russian press as the best female performance of all time. Shcherbakova made history by becoming the first woman to win three consecutive Russian titles since Slutskaya (1999–2001) and the first since the introduction of the ISU Judging system in 2004. Shcherbakova was assigned to the Russian team for the 2021 World Championships in Stockholm. Prior to the World Championships, she participated in the televised 2021 Channel One Trophy as part of the Red Machine team captained by Zagitova. She placed second in both segments of the competition, and the Red Machine won the trophy. She opted not to participate in the Russian Cup Final in order to rest before the World Championships.

In the short program at the World Championships, Shcherbakova skated a personal best in the short program, scoring 81.00 to place first ahead of Kihira. She then placed second in the free program with a score of 152.17 points despite falling on one of her quad jumps. Overall, Shcherbakova won the competition with a total score of 233.17 and became the World champion. Shcherbakova, Tuktamysheva and Trusova's podium placements made this only the second time, after the United States in 1991, that a single country had swept the women's podium at the World Championships. Shcherbakova then competed as part of the Russian team for the 2021 World Team Trophy in April, winning the short program on the opening day within one point ahead of Tuktamysheva. Shcherbakova finished in first place and won a gold medal with team Russia.

==== 2021–2022 season: Olympic champion ====
Shcherbakova began her Olympic season in October at the 2021 Budapest Trophy. She led after the short program but was later overtaken in the free skate by training-mate Maiia Khromykh after falling on her opening quad flip. She placed second in the free skate to finish narrowly behind Khromykh and take the silver medal overall. Her first Grand Prix assignment was initially the 2021 Cup of China, but following its cancellation, she was reassigned to the 2021 Gran Premio d'Italia in Turin. After an error on her jump combination in the short program, she placed third in that segment behind Loena Hendrickx and Khromykh. She came back in the free skate and landed a quad flip to win both that segment and the gold medal. Shcherbakova went on to win her second event, the 2021 Internationaux de France, defeating Kostornaia by almost eight points. These results qualified her for the Grand Prix Final, which was subsequently canceled due to restrictions prompted by the spread of the Omicron variant.

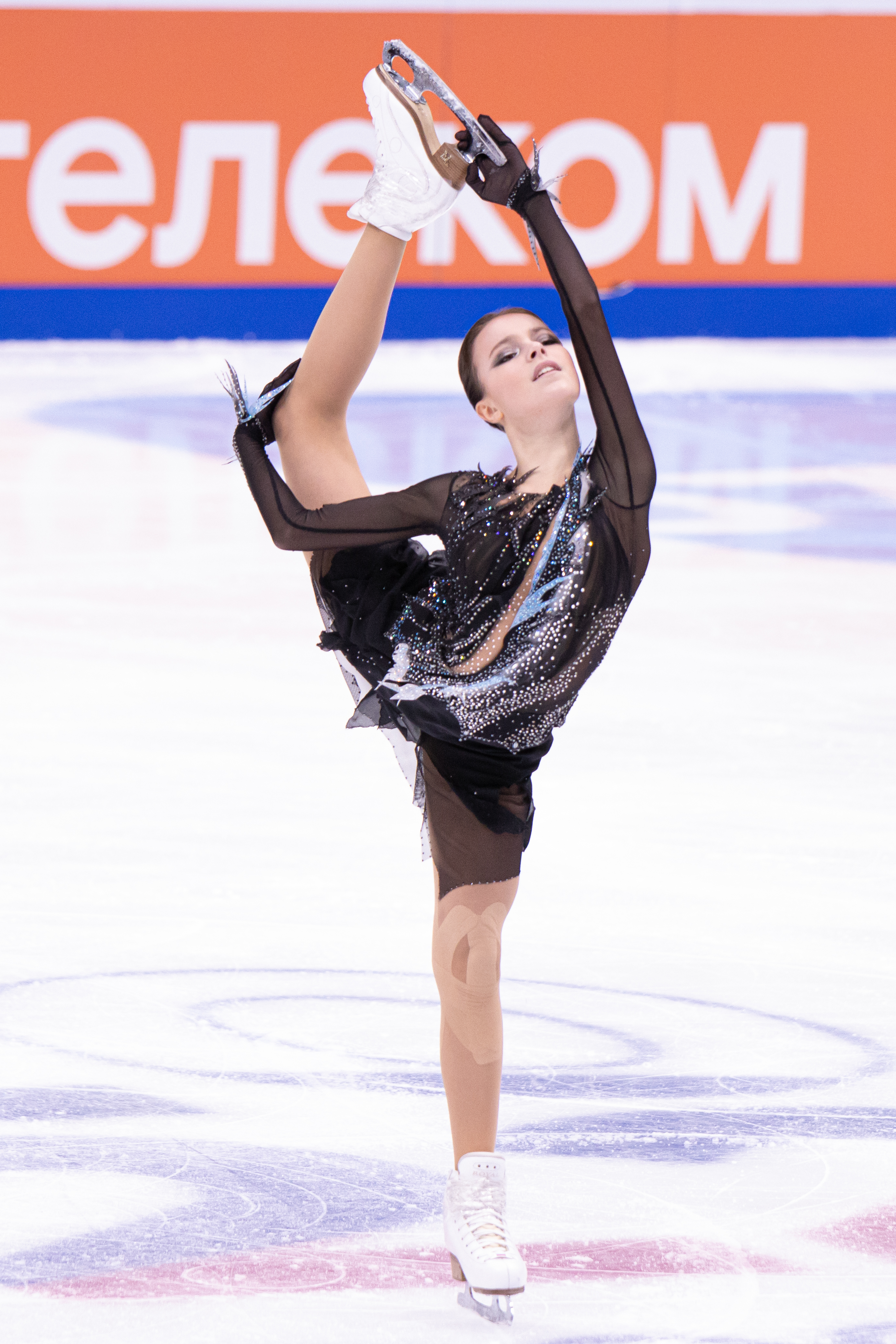
Shcherbakova performing in the short program at the 2022 Russian Championships

At the 2022 Russian Championships, Shcherbakova placed second in the short program behind Valieva. She fell on her only quad attempt in the free skate, placing fourth in that segment, but took the bronze medal overall behind Valieva and Trusova.
However, in 2023, Valieva was stripped of the Russian title due to testing positive for a banned substance, so Shcherbakova became the silver medalist. At the 2022 European Championships in Tallinn, Shcherbakova placed fourth in the short program after falling on her triple Lutz and failing to execute a jump combination. Mounting a comeback in the free skate with a quad flip and seven triple jumps, she placed second in the segment and took the silver medal. Two years later, in January 2024, Shcherbakova became the 2022 European champion after Valieva's results were annulled.

On 20 January, Shcherbakova was officially named to the Russian Olympic team. She was not considered the favorite to win the gold medal in the women's event after losing to Valieva at both the Russian and European Championships. She was not selected to compete in the team event as Valieva competed in both segments. In the short program of the women's event, she skated cleanly and placed second in the short program with a score of 80.20, 1.94 points behind segment leader Valieva and 0.36 points ahead of third-place Sakamoto. In the free skate, Shcherbakova skated cleanly once again, scoring 175.75 and a total score of 255.95. Shcherbakova won the gold medal and became the Olympic champion ahead of teammate Trusova and Sakamoto. She was the first Olympic champion in women's single skating to compete quadruple jumps. After winning the gold medal, Shcherbakova indicated that she wanted to continue competing, including at the upcoming World Championships.

In early March 2022, the ISU banned all figure skaters and officials from Russia and Belarus from attending the World Championships due to the Russian invasion of Ukraine in late February; therefore, Shcherbakova was not allowed to participate and defend her title. Instead, Russia organized the Channel One Trophy to occur during the World Championships. She was named the captain of the Red Machine team. The first day of the competition was a jumping competition, and Shcherbakova led her team to victory. She finished second in the short program with a score of 82.90 and first in the free skating with a score of 176.12. This led the Red Machine team to win the competition.

==== 2022–2023 season: Injury ====
In August 2022, Shcherbakova traveled to Germany in order to have knee surgery for an old injury. She did not recover from the surgery in time for the 2023 Russian Championships. On 18 March 2023, she performed in Moscow at a show program tournament called the "Russian Challenge". She presented a program to the music from the Soviet TV series "Seventeen Moments of Spring" and finished third in the competition with a score of 19.08.

==== 2023–2024 season: Illness ====
Shcherbakova was listed as a reserve member of the 2023–24 Russian Women's Figure Skating national team. In July 2023, while training at Tutberidze's preparatory camp training for a potential resumption of competition, Shcherbakova contracted mononucleosis and was forced to suspend training. She was absent from a list of participants in the Russian national team's preseason skating tests published 30 August by the Russian Figure Skating Federation. In March 2024, Shcherbakova was injured and underwent ankle surgery.

== Skating technique ==
Shcherbakova's skating has been distinguished by her high consistency in the performance of her programs. Her performances and technique are also highlighted by her ability to consistently land the quad Lutz and quad flip. Her quad jumping ability is often compared to those of her teammates Kamila Valieva and Alexandra Trusova. Because she performs fewer quad jumps than Valieva and Trusova, Shcherbakova relies on her consistency and artistry. She is known for her musicality and dramatic performances.

Alongside teammate Trusova, Shcherbakova is credited for ushering in the era of quad jumps in competitive women's figure skating, especially domestically. Prior to Shcherbakova's senior domestic debut, not a single quad jump was landed by any of the woman skaters at the Russian Figure Skating Championships. Since then, quad jumps have become a prominent feature in Russian women's single skating.

== Personal life ==
In 2022, Scherbakova enrolled at Russian State University of Physical Education, Sport, Youth and Tourism.

She announced her engagement to former Russian hockey player, Artem Shakirov, in July 2026.

== Public image ==
=== Endorsements ===
In March 2020, Shcherbakova signed an endorsement contract with Nike, and Nike listed her as a "Nike Athlete". Starting in November 2021, she became an official brand representative for Russian financial services company Sberbank and starred in an advertisement. The Chinese auto maker, Chery, welcomed Shcherbakova as their ambassador in May 2022 to endorse the Chery Omoda 5 model, and she received a custom Omoda model as her first car. Later the same year, with her father's advice, Shcherbakova collaborated with Chinese company Geetaverse to release a collection of NFTs titled "Born to Skate". In the first 24 hours after the launch, the sales amount reached nearly RMB¥1 million, and the total sales amount reached RMB¥1.6 million. This marked a new milestone as the quickest and largest NFT sales in China's sports industry for a single individual, with transactions totaling US$237,500 in a few days. Shcherbakova started endorsing MELA, a Russian sporting goods brand, as their ambassador in March 2023. In the next month, she promoted the Chinese video game Honkai: Star Rail, publishing a photoset in which she appeared as "Seele", the first limited banner character in the game created by HoYoverse. TCL Electronics announced Shcherbakova as the brand ambassador in Russia starting from June 2023, and she also featured in their promotional material.

In January 2024, Shcherbakova was appointed as an ambassador of the national brand "Made in Russia" by the Russian Export Center and attended the opening ceremony of the first "Made in Russia" Festival-fair in Shenyang, China. At a press conference at the Russian national team's test skate, Shcherbakova was announced as an ambassador for the 2025 Russian Championships in Omsk.

=== Magazine covers ===
Shcherbakova appeared on the cover of the March 2020 Russian edition of Tatler alongside teammates Alina Zagitova, Alexandra Trusova, and Alena Kostornaia. She was on the cover of the "Hello!" magazine a total of three times: alongside Anastasia Bezrukova and Alena Arakcheeva in March 2019, and twice individually in July 2021 and December 2022. In February 2023, she appeared on the cover of the Russian edition of The Voice magazine alongside Zagitova.

=== Film and television ===
In October 2022, Shcherbakova joined fellow Russian Olympic champions Alexei Yagudin and Alina Zagitova as a host of the ninth season of Ice Age on Channel One. In December 2022, Shcherbakova hosted the New Year's Eve show on Channel One. Shcherbakova was voted by Komsomolskaya Pravda readers as the second-best Russian television presenter of 2022, behind Zagitova. On 22 November 2022, Shcherbakova made her voice actor debut in a CGTN production titled "Revived Myths of Ancient China". The project has released three animated videos: "Nv Wa", "Hou Yi" and "The Classic of Mountains and Seas".

During the 2024-2025 season, Shcherbakova also commentated on Channel One for the Russian Grand Prix Series and the 2025 Russian Figure Skating Championships.

Following the start of the 2025-26 figure skating season, Anna Shcherbakova has commentated on the Russian Grand Prix Series, and will commentate on the uncoming 2026 Russian Figure Skating Championships, all on Channel One.

== Records and achievements ==
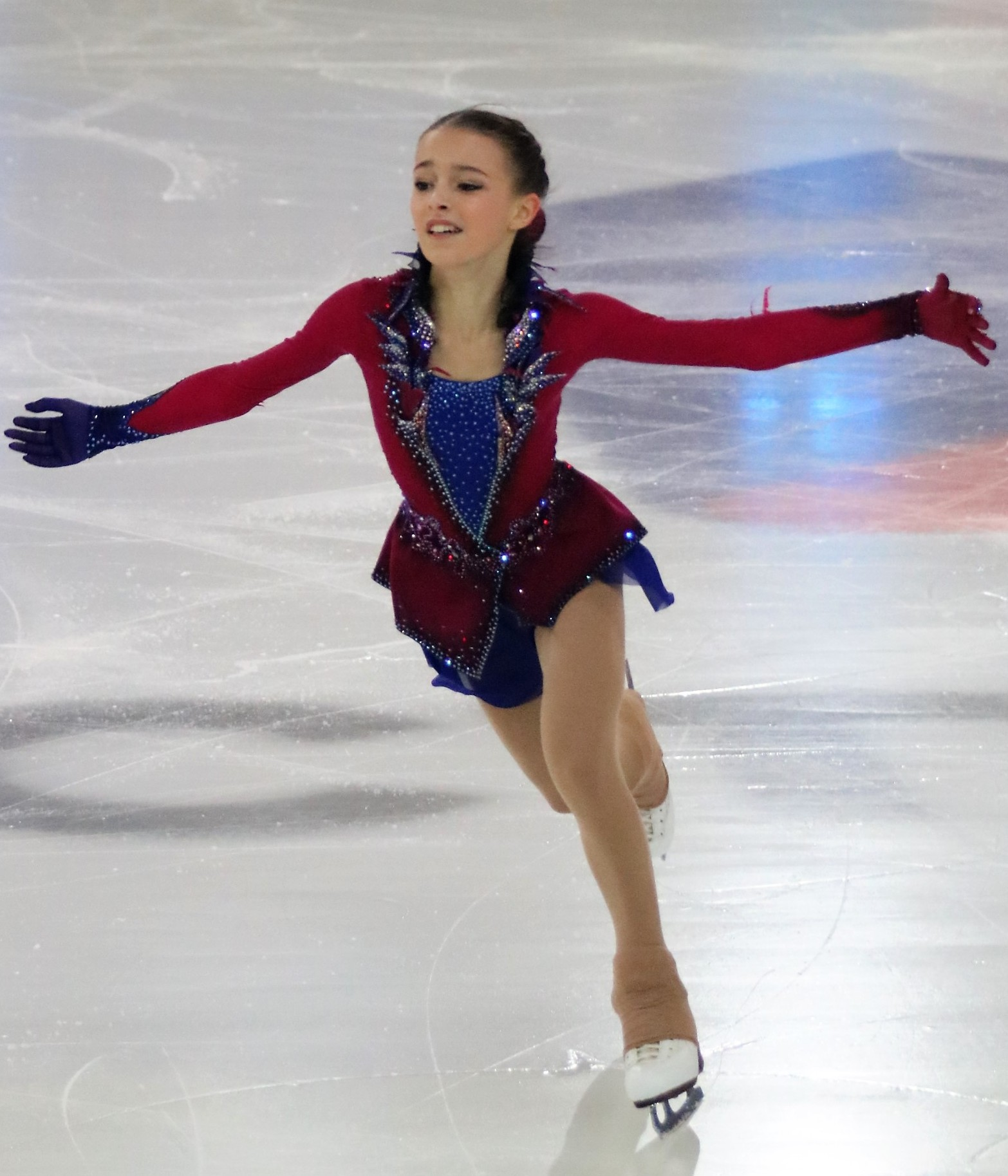
Shcherbakova at the 2019 Russian Championships

- Set the women's record for the combined total (205.39 points), short program (73.18 points) and free program (132.21 points) at the 2018 JGP Slovakia. Her free program record was broken by Russian teammate Alena Kostornaia at the 2018 JGP Austria on 1 September 2018 with 132.42 points. Her short program and combined total records were broken by Russian teammate Alexandra Trusova at the 2018 JGP Lithuania on 6 September 2018.
- First woman skater to land a quad Lutz on 6 October 2018 at the 2nd stage of the 2019 Russian Cup, which is recognised by ISU in the media guide.
- Second senior woman skater after Elizabet Tursynbaeva to land a quad jump internationally at the 2019 CS Lombardia Trophy.
- First woman skater to land a quad Lutz in senior international competition on 14 September 2019 at the 2019 CS Lombardia Trophy.
- First woman skater to land two quad Lutz jumps in one program in ISU-sanctioned international competition at the 2019 Skate America. At this competition, she also became the first woman to land a quad Lutz and a triple jump combination in an international competition.
- Set the new record for the highest valued single jump when she earned 14.79 points for her quadruple Lutz at the 2019 Skate America. At this competition, she also set the new record for the highest valued jump combination when she earned 18.66 points for her 4Lz+3T combination. This was later broken by Alexandra Trusova when she earned 14.95 points for her quadruple Lutz at the 2019 Rostelecom Cup.
- First senior woman skater to land two quad flip jumps in one program at the 2022 Winter Olympics. At this competition, she also became the first woman to land a quad flip and a triple jump combination in competition.
- First Olympic champion in women's single skating with quad jumps.

== Awards ==
- Master of Sports of Russia (2018)
- Master of Sports of Russia International Class (2020)
- Nominated by the ISU for the Best Costume Award (2020)
- Honoured Master of Sports of Russia (2021)
- Russian Order of Friendship (2022)
- Certificate of Merit by the Moscow City Duma (2022)
- "Pride of Russia" National Sports Award – Athlete of the Year (2022)
- Russian Olympic Committee – Best Athlete of the Olympic Games in Tokyo and Beijing (2022)
- Russian Athletes' Union – Best Athlete of the Beijing 2022 Olympic Winter Games (2023)
- Silver Doe Award – Best Athletes (2022)
- Nominated by the ISU for the Most Valuable Skater Award (2023)

== Programs ==
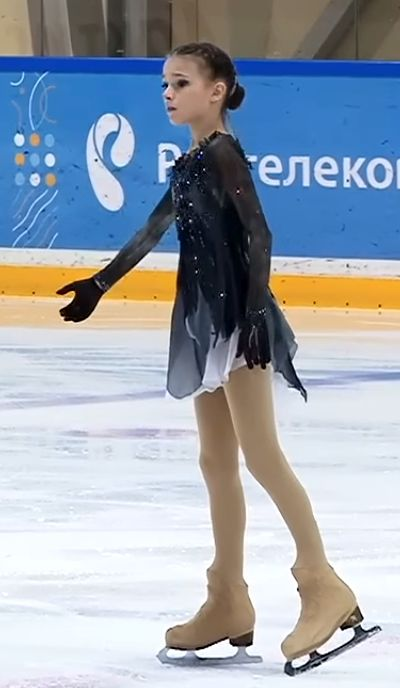
Shcherbakova at the 2017 Russian Cup Final

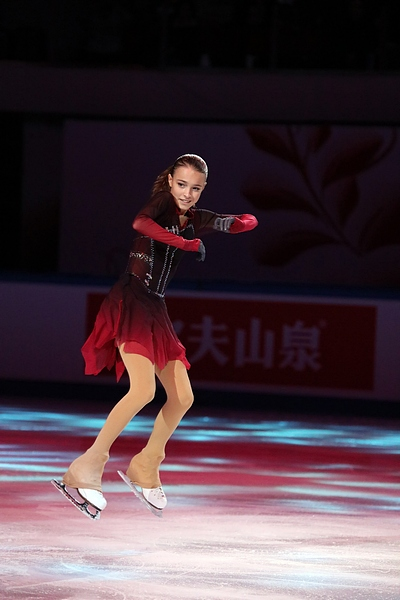
Shcherbakova performing her gala program at the 2019 Cup of China

Program Notes

- Program details mentioned at first occurrence
- Olympic seasons highlighted in blue
- Programs performed at the Winter Olympics highlighted in **bold**

Competition and exhibition programs by season
Season	Short program	Free skate program	Exhibition program
2017–18	Nocturnes, Op. 9: Composed by Frédéric Chopin	"Dreamcatcher": Performed by Secret Garden	—N/a
2018–19	"A Comme Amour": Composed by Richard Clayderman; Choreo. by Daniil Gleikhengauz	Introduction and Rondo Capriccioso: Composed by Camille Saint-Saëns	"Kimono": Performed by Strawhatz & Toyboys; Choreo. by Daniil Gleikhengauz
2018–19	"A Comme Amour": Composed by Richard Clayderman; Choreo. by Daniil Gleikhengauz	Introduction and Rondo Capriccioso: Composed by Camille Saint-Saëns	"Dreamcatcher"
2019–20	Perfume: From Perfume: The Story of a Murderer; Composed by Tom Tykwer, Johnny Klimek, and Reinhold Heil; Choreo. by Daniil Gleikhengauz; **Tracks used**: 1. "The Girl with the Plums"; 2. "Meeting Laura"; 3. "Laura's Murder"	The Firebird: 1. Gnossiennes No.1; Composed by Erik Satie; Performed by Roland Pöntinen; 2. The Firebird; Composed by Igor Stravinsky; Choreo. by Daniil Gleikhengauz	"Kimono"
2020–21	Elegie: O Doux printemps d'autrefois: Composed by Jules Massenet; Performed by Joshua Bell; Choreo. by Daniil Gleikhengauz	"Forgiveness": 1. "Morning Passages"; From The Hours; Composed by Philip Glass; 2. "Forgiveness"; From The Home of Dark Butterflies; Composed by Panu Aaltio; 3. "Beethoven's 5 Secrets"; Composed by The Piano Guys; Choreo. by Daniil Gleikhengauz	"Everybody Wants to Rule the World": From The Hunger Games: Catching Fire; Performed by Lorde; Choreo. by Daniil Gleikhengauz
2021–22	"The Songs of Distant Earth": Composed by Kirill Richter; Choreo. by Daniil Gleikhengauz	The Master and Margarita: 1. "Ruska"; Composed by Apocalyptica; 2. "Waltz"; From The Master and Margarita; Composed by Igor Kornelyuk; 3. Requiem; Composed by Wolfgang Amadeus Mozart; Performed by David Garrett; Choreo. by Daniil Gleikhengauz	The Firebird
2021–22	**"Dangerous Affairs"**: Composed by Inon Zur; Choreo. by Daniil Gleikhengauz; **Tracks used**: 1. "Dangerous Affairs"; 2. "Total View"	**The Master and Margarita**	**Ave Maria**: Composed by Franz Schubert; Performed by Dimash Qudaibergen; Choreo. by Daniil Gleikhengauz
2022–23	—N/a	—N/a	"Couple in a Cafe": From Seventeen Moments of Spring; Composed by Mikael Tariverdiev; Choreo. by Eteri Tutberidze & Daniil Gleikhengauz
2022–23	—N/a	—N/a	"Comets": Performed by Polnalyubvi
2022–23	—N/a	—N/a	Ave Maria
2022–23	—N/a	—N/a	"The Prayer of Francois Villion": Performed by Regina Spektor; Choreo. by Ilia Averbukh
2023–24	—N/a	—N/a	Ave Maria
2023–24	—N/a	—N/a	"Comets"
2023–24	—N/a	—N/a	"Frozen": Performed by Madonna
2023–24	—N/a	—N/a	"Couple in a Cafe"
2023–24	—N/a	—N/a	"What Are You Thinking About": Performed by Alexey Vorobyov

== Competitive highlights ==
External videos
- Anna's short program performance at the 2022 Beijing Olympics
- Anna's free skate performance at the 2022 Beijing Olympics

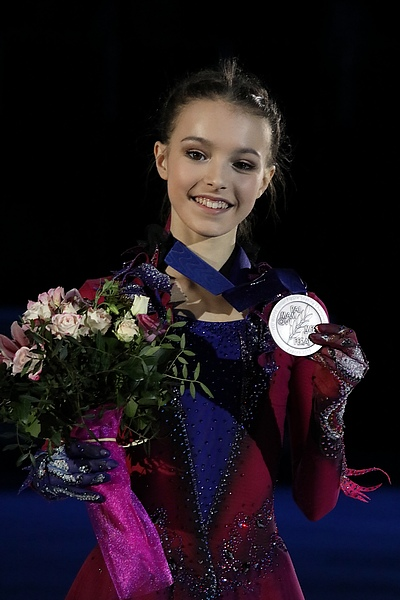
Shcherbakova with her silver medal from the 2019 World Junior Championships

- GP – Event of the ISU Grand Prix Series
- JGP – Event of the ISU Junior Grand Prix Series
- CS – Event of the ISU Challenger Series
- C – Event was cancelled
- Medals at team events are awarded for the team results only. Individual placements at team events are listed in parentheses.

Competition placements at senior level
Season	2018–19	2019–20	2020–21	2021–22
Winter Olympics				1st
World Championships		C	1st	
European Championships		2nd	C	1st
Grand Prix Final		2nd		C
Russian Championships	1st	1st	1st	2nd
World Team Trophy			1st (1st)	
GP Cup of China		1st		
GP France				1st
GP Italy				1st
GP Skate America		1st		
CS Lombardia Trophy		1st		
Budapest Trophy				2nd

Competition placements at junior level
Season	2017–18	2018–19
World Junior Championships		2nd
Junior Grand Prix Final		5th
Russian Championships	13th	3rd
JGP Canada		1st
JGP Slovakia		1st
European Youth Olympic Festival		1st
Russian Cup Final	1st	

== Detailed results ==
- TSS – Total segment score highlighted in **bold**
- TES – Technical element score
- PCS – Program component score

ISU personal best scores in the +5/-5 GOE System
Segment	Type	Score	Event
Total	**TSS**	**255.95**	2022 Winter Olympics
Short program	**TSS**	**81.07**	2021 World Team Trophy
Short program	TES	43.86	2021 World Championships
Short program	PCS	37.56	2021 World Team Trophy
Free skating	**TSS**	**175.75**	2022 Winter Olympics
Free skating	TES	100.49	2022 Winter Olympics
Free skating	PCS	75.26	2022 Winter Olympics

- Small medals for the short program and free skate are only awarded at ISU Championships.
- Medals at team events are awarded for the team results only. Individual placements at team events are listed in parentheses.

=== Senior level ===
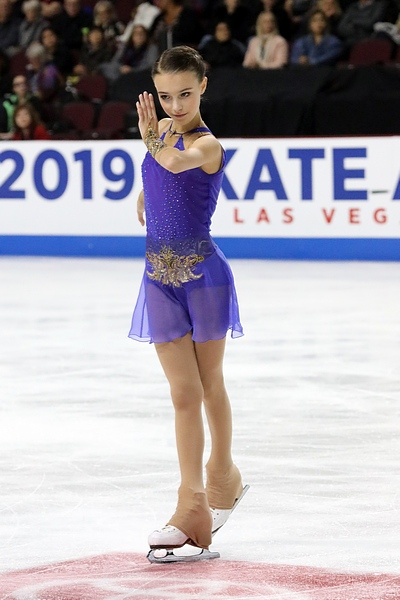
Shcherbakova at the 2019 Skate America

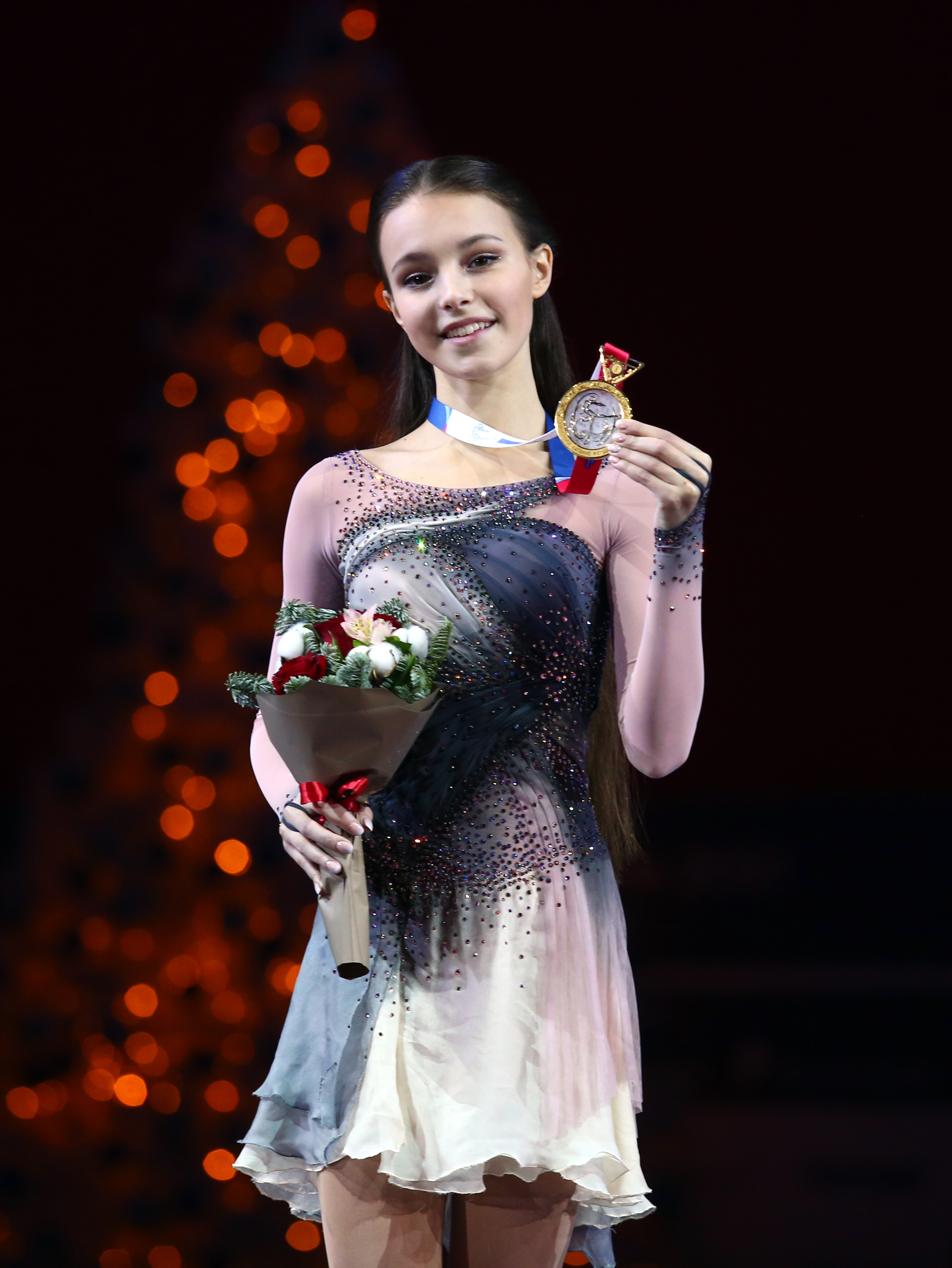
Shcherbakova with her gold medal at the 2021 Russian Championships

Results in the 2018–19 season
Date	Event	SP		FS		Total		Details
Date	Event	P	Score	P	Score	P	Score	Details
19–23 Dec 2018	(Russia) 2019 Russian Championships	5	74.09	1	155.69	1	229.78	Details

Results in the 2019–20 season
Date	Event	SP		FS		Total		Details
Date	Event	P	Score	P	Score	P	Score	Details
13–15 Sep 2019	(Italy) 2019 CS Lombardia Trophy	3	67.73	1	150.47	1	218.20	Details
18–20 Oct 2019	(United States) 2019 Skate America	4	67.60	1	160.16	1	227.76	Details
8–10 Nov 2019	2019 Cup of China	1	73.51	1	152.53	1	226.04	Details
5–8 Dec 2019	(Italy) 2019–20 Grand Prix Final	3	78.27	1	162.65	2	240.92	Details
26–29 Dec 2019	(Russia) 2020 Russian Championships	2	79.93	1	181.94	1	261.87	Details
24–25 Jan 2020	(Austria) 2020 European Championships	2	77.95	1	159.81	2	237.76	Details

Results in the 2020–21 season
Date	Event	SP		FS		Total		Details
Date	Event	P	Score	P	Score	P	Score	Details
23–27 Dec 2020	(Russia) 2021 Russian Championships	1	80.31	1	183.79	1	264.10	Details
22–28 Mar 2021	(Sweden) 2021 World Championships	1	81.00	2	152.17	1	233.17	Details
15–18 Apr 2021	(Japan) 2021 World Team Trophy	1	81.07	1	160.58	1 (1)	241.65	Details

Results in the 2021–22 season
Date	Event	SP		FS		Total		Details
Date	Event	P	Score	P	Score	P	Score	Details
14–17 Oct 2021	(Hungary) 2021 Budapest Trophy	1	74.76	2	147.97	2	222.73	Details
5–7 Nov 2021	(Italy) 2021 Gran Premio d'Italia	3	71.73	1	165.05	1	236.78	Details
19–21 Nov 2021	2021 Internationaux de France	1	77.94	1	151.75	1	229.69	Details
21–26 Dec 2021	(Russia) 2022 Russian Championships	2	81.46	3	158.10	2	239.56	Details
10–16 Jan 2022	(Estonia) 2022 European Championships	3	69.05	1	168.37	1	237.42	Details
15–17 Feb 2022	(China) 2022 Winter Olympics	1	80.20	2	175.75	1	255.95	Details

=== Junior level ===
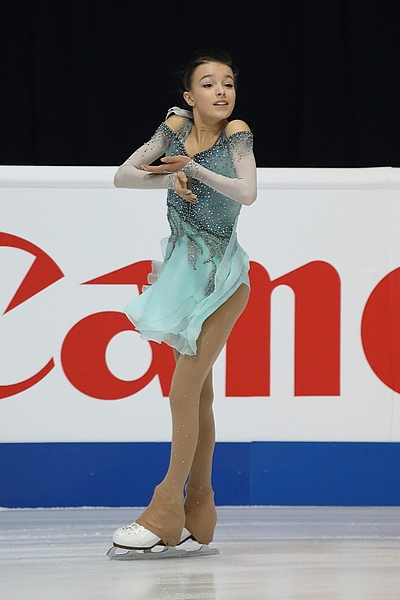
Shcherbakova at the 2019 World Junior Championships

Results in the 2017–18 season
Date	Event	SP		FS		Total		Details
Date	Event	P	Score	P	Score	P	Score	Details
23–26 Jan 2018	(Russia) 2018 Russian Junior Championships	8	68.19	16	111.00	13	179.19	Details
19–23 Feb 2018	(Russia) 2017–18 Russian Cup Final	3	68.99	2	141.86	1	210.85	Details

Results in the 2018–19 season
Date	Event	SP		FS		Total		Details
Date	Event	P	Score	P	Score	P	Score	Details
22–25 Aug 2018	2018 JGP Slovakia	1	73.18	1	132.21	1	205.39	Details
12–15 Sep 2018	2018 JGP Canada	1	65.07	1	130.49	1	195.56	Details
6–9 Dec 2018	(Canada) 2018–19 Junior Grand Prix Final	6	56.26	5	125.57	5	181.83	Details
1–4 Feb 2019	(Russia) 2019 Russian Junior Championships	2	77.17	3	146.80	3	223.97	Details
13–14 Feb 2019	(Bosnia and Herzegovina) 2019 European Youth Olympic Festival	1	72.57	1	130.22	1	202.79	Details
4–10 Mar 2019	(Croatia) 2019 World Junior Championships	1	72.86	2	147.08	2	219.94	Details
