= Winter Poem =

Studio album by Secret Garden
- Released: 11 November 2011
- Genre: New-age, classical, Celtic
- Length: 55:31
- Label: Hearts of Space; Universal
- Producer: Rolf Løvland

Secret Garden chronology
| Inside I'm Singing (2007) | Winter Poem (2011) | Just the Two of Us (2013) |

Winter Poem is the seventh studio album by Secret Garden. It was released on 11 November 2011 by Hearts of Space and Universal. Primarily an instrumental album, it features three songs with guest vocals: Moya Brennan of the band Clannad on "The Dream", Fionnuala Gill on "Mary’s Lament", and Tracey Campbell and Espen Grjotheim on "Powered By Nature".

The lyrics to "Mary's Lament" were written by Brendan Graham. He previously collaborated with Rolf Løvland on You Raise Me Up and The Gates of Dawn.

"Powered By Nature" and "Suite" were written for Expo 2010 Shanghai China with the first serving as Norway's official Expo-song. In connection with the record release, Secret Garden will do a concert tour in Norway. Much of the music from "Winter Poem" will be performed in-concert as well as older repertoire from the group's 16 year musical history.

Winter Poem spent thirteen weeks on the Billboard Top New Age Albums chart and ranked fifteenth on their year end chart.

== Track listing ==
| # | Title | Length | Guest Vocals |
|---|---|---|---|
| 1 | Make a Wish | 3:40 | |
| 2 | Song for a New Beginning | 3:23 | |
| 3 | The Dream | 4:30 | Moya Brennan |
| 4 | Frozen in Time | 3:50 | |
| 5 | Anticipation | 3:51 | |
| 6 | Fionnuala's Cookie Jar | 3:41 | |
| 7 | Mary's Lament | 3:56 | Fionnuala Gill |
| 8 | Song at the End of the Day | 3:21 | |
| 9 | Lament for a Frozen Flower | 5:11 | |
| 10 | Powered by Nature | 5:39 | Tracey Campbell and Espen Grjotheim |
| 11 | Suite (Prelude, Intermezzo, Polka, Air, Interlude, Hymn) | 14:29 | |
