= Earthsongs =

Album by Secret Garden

Studio album by Secret Garden
- Released: 24 August 2004
- Genre: New-age
- Length: 67:34
- Label: Decca
- Producer: Rolf Løvland; Fionnuala Sherry; Simon Franglen

Secret Garden chronology
| Once in a Red Moon (2001) | Earthsongs (2004) | Inside I'm Singing (2007) |

Singles from Earthsongs
- 1. "Sleepsong" Released: 30 December 2003

Earthsongs is the eighth studio album by Secret Garden. It was released on 24 August 2004 by Decca Records.

== Track listing ==
| No. | Title | Length |
|---|---|---|
| 1. | "Sometimes When It Rains" | 4:35 |
| 2. | "Fields of Fortune" | 4:10 |
| 3. | "The Reel" | 3:25 |
| 4. | "Always There" | 4:43 |
| 5. | "When Darkness Falls" | 5:23 |
| 6. | "Sleepsong (featuring Fionnuala Gill)" | 4:49 |
| 7. | "Lotus" | 4:32 |
| 8. | "Searching for the Past" | 3:10 |
| 9. | "Daughters of Erin" | 2:35 |
| 10. | "Half a World Away" | 4:35 |
| 11. | "Grace" | 4:45 |
| 12. | "Raise Your Voices" | 4:09 |
| 13. | "Canzona" | 4:34 |
| 14. | "Sarabande" | 3:13 |
| 15. | "Silence Speaks" | 4:38 |

== Song notes ==
"Sleepsong" features artist Fionnuala Gill (Saoirse). "Grace" features Ole Edvard Antonsen on trumpet and piccolo-trumpet.

Lyrics for "Always There", "Sleepsong", "Half a World Away", and "Raise Your Voices" were written by Brendan Graham. "Half a World Away" features vocals by Jan Werner Danielsen, and is a lyrical version of the instrumental opening track "Sometimes When It Rains".

== Charts ==
Chart performance for Earthsongs
| Chart (2005) | Peak position |
|---|---|
| Australian Albums (ARIA) | 51 |
| Norwegian Albums (VG-lista) | 9 |
