= Just the Two of Us (Secret Garden album) =

Studio album by Secret Garden
- Released: 27 December 2013; 19 August 2014
- Genres: New-age, classical
- Labels: Hearts of Space; Universal
- Producer: Rolf Løvland

Secret Garden chronology
Winter Poem (2011)	Just the Two of Us (2013)	Storyteller (2019)

Just the Two of Us is the eighth studio album by Secret Garden. It was released on 27 December 2013 by Hearts of Space and Universal.

The purely instrumental album features Secret Garden playing some of their most popular songs re-envisioned as duo arrangements along with two new pieces: the title-track “Just the Two of Us” and “En Passant”.

Rolf Løvland described the album, “Our music always starts with just the two of us – Rolf & Fionnuala; even when we’re performing with a full production on stage. So it feels natural and good to perform some of our music in the most intimate and stripped-down version – that musical place where Secret Garden was born.”

The album debuted at number seven on the Billboard Top New Age Albums chart.

== Track listing ==
=== Standard edition ===
#	Title	Length
1	Sometimes When It Rains	4:32
2	Heartstrings	3:20
3	Awakening	3:57
4	The Promise	3:22
5	Reflection	3:04
6	Ode to Simplicity	3:27
7	Poéme	3:42
8	Sortie	3:39
9	Just the Two of Us	3:54
10	Song From a Secret Garden	3:19
11	En Passant	3:12
12	Papillon	3:19
13	Belonging	4:08
14	Serenade to Spring	3:02
15	Song at the End of the Day	3:41

=== 2013 promotional edition (Panorama LC 30351) ===
#	Title	Length	Featuring	Notes
1	Sometimes When It Rains	4:33		
2	Heartstrings	3:20		
3	Awakening	3:57		
4	The Promise	3:22		
5	Reflection	3:05		
6	Ode to Simplicity	3:27		
7	Poéme	3:42		
8	Sortie	3:40		
9	Just the Two of Us	3:54		New song
10	Song From a Secret Garden	3:19		
11	En Passant	3:10		New song
12	Nocturne	3:26		Bonus track
13	Papillon	3:19		
14	Belonging	4:09		
15	Serenade to Spring	3:02		
16	Song at the End of the Day	3:42		
17	You Raise Me Up	5:05	Brian Kennedy and Tracey Campbell-Nation	Bonus track
18	Elegie	3:48		Bonus track
19	Frozen in Time	4:11		Bonus track
