= Dawn of a New Century =

Studio album by Secret Garden
- Released: 20 April 1999
- Genre: New-age
- Length: 54:59
- Label: Universal Music (Norway); Philips
- Producer: Rolf Løvland

Secret Garden chronology
White Stones (1997)	Dawn of a New Century (1999)	Once in a Red Moon (2002)

Dawn of a New Century is the third studio album by Irish-Norwegian duo Secret Garden. It was released on 20 April 1999 by Universal Music and Philips.

Capercaillie's frontwoman Karen Matheson performed as a soloist for the song "Prayer".

Professional ratings
Review scores
Source	Rating
Allmusic	3/5 stars

== Reception ==
Allmusic reviewer Michael Gallucci awarded the album 3 stars.

== Track listing ==
No.	Title	Length
1.	"Moongate"	4:31
2.	"Prayer"	4:35
3.	"Elan"	3:12
4.	"Dreamcatcher"	4:37
5.	"Sona"	4:22
6.	"In Our Tears"	4:42
7.	"Children of the River"	3:51
8.	"Evensong"	4:27
9.	"Lore of the Loom"	3:22
10.	"Aria"	4:21
11.	"Divertimento"	2:53
12.	"Aquarell"	4:38
13.	"Dawn of a New Century"	6:14

== Credits ==
- Violin – Fionnuala Sherry
- Lead Vocals – Anne Karin Kaasa, Fionnuala Sherry, Karen Matheson & Nikki Matheson
- Keyboards & Piano – Rolf Løvland
- Keyboards – Bjørn Ole Rasch
- Electric guitar – Terje Rypdal
- Guitar – Rolf Kristensen
- Additional guitar - Alf Emil Eik
- Classical guitar – Lars Hanniball
- Hardingfele (Hardanger Fiddle) – Annbjørg Lien
- Narrator – John Kavanagh
- Oboe, English Horn – Henrik Eurenius
- Choir – Anúna
- Orchestra – Irish National Symphony Orchestra, RTÉ Concert Orchestra
- Recorder & bagpipes – Hans Fredrik Jacobsen
- Whistle – Hans Fredrik Jacobsen & Mick O'Brien
- Accordion – Máirtín O'Connor
- Bass – Per Elias Drabløs
- Dizi (Chinese flutes) – Steinar Ofsdal
- Drums, Percussion – Noel Eccles & Ottar Nesje
- Backing Vocals – Alf Emil Eik, Nikki Matheson, Rolf Løvland
- Bagpipes [Uilleann] – Mick O'Brien & Pat Broaders
- Percussion, Bodhrán, Spoons, Bones – Tommy Hayes
- Engineer – Alf Emil Eik, Andrew Boland, Oskar Pall Sveinson, Trond Engebretsen
- Co-producer – Fionnuala Sherry
- Composer, producer & arranger – Rolf Løvland

== Charts ==
Chart (1999)	Peak position
Taiwanese International Albums (IFPI Taiwan)	6
