= Danse mot vår =

Single by Elisabeth Andreassen

from the album Stemninger
- Released: 1992
- Songwriters: Rolf Løvland, Britt Viberg

Danse mot vår (lit.: Dancing towards spring) is a song written and composed by Rolf Løvland and Britt Viberg. It was originally recorded by Elisabeth Andreassen on her 1992 album Stemninger. She scored a late 1992 Norsktoppen hit with the song.

Secret Garden' recorded an instrumental version, entitled "Serenade to Spring", on their 1995 debut album Songs from a Secret Garden. The song is available with Korean lyrics, as well. The song was very famous in Vietnam since it was used as one of theme song in Weather Forecast show by Vietnam Television.
