= Dreamcatcher (disambiguation) =

A dreamcatcher is a Native American cultural object.

Dreamcatcher or Dream Catcher may also refer to:

== People and characters ==
- The Dreamcatcher, nom de guerre of Gegard Mousasi, a Dutch mixed martial arts fighter
- Dreamcatcher, a Skylanders: Trap Team villain

== Places ==
- Dreamcatcher, Cacodemon boulder, Squamish, B.C., Canada; a 9a climbing route first ascended by Chris Sharma
- Dreamcatcher (roller coaster), a rollercoaster in Bobbejaanland of Belgium

== Businesses and organizations ==
- Dreamcatcher Company, a South Korean entertainment company
- DreamCatcher Interactive, a Canadian video game publisher
- Dreamcatcher Broadcasting, a U.S. broadcasting company
- The Dreamcatcher Foundation, a Chicago-based U.S. non-profit

== Arts and entertainment ==
=== Film ===
- Dreamcatcher (2003 film), based on the Stephen King novel
- Dreamcatcher (2015 film), a documentary about prostitution
- Dreamcatcher (2021 film), a horror film
- The Dream Catcher (film), a 1999 independent drama directed by Edward Radtke

=== Television ===
- Dreamcatchers (TV series), a travel documentary TV series
- The Dream Catchers, a TV series produced by Singapore's Chinese-language channel MediaCorp Channel 8
- "Dreamcatcher" (Once Upon a Time), an episode from the fifth season of the TV series Once Upon a Time
- "Dream Catcher", a 2021 episode of Star Trek: Prodigy

=== Music ===
- Dreamcatcher (group), a South Korean pop group

==== Albums ====
- Dreamcatcher (Ian Gillan album), 1997
- Dreamcatcher (Last Autumn's Dream album), 2008
- Dreamcatcher (Andy McKee album), 2004
- Dreamcatcher (Secret Garden album), 2000
- Dreamcatcher (David Lowe album), 1997
- Dreamcatcher, an album by Mark Medlock and Dieter Bohlen, 2007

==== Songs ====
- "Dreamcatcher", a 2001 song by Secret Garden from the eponymous album Dreamcatcher
- "Dream Catcher", a 2010 song by The Word Alive from Deceiver
- "Dreamcatcher", a 2014 song by Erra from the EP Moments of Clarity
- "Dreamcatcher", a 2015 song by Crystal Lake from the album The Sign
- "Dreamcatcher", a 2016 song by Celldweller from the album Soundtrack for the Voices in My Head Vol. 03
- "Dreamcatcher", a 2018 song by Metro Boomin from the album Not All Heroes Wear Capes
- "Dreamcatcher", a 2018 song by LP from Heart to Mouth
- "Dreamcatcher", a 2020 song by GFriend from Labyrinth

=== Literature ===
- Dreamcatcher (novel), a 2001 novel by Stephen King
- The Dream Catcher (novel), a 1986 children's novel by Monica Hughes

=== Other media ===
- Spirit Catcher, also called Dream Catcher, a sculpture by Ron Baird

== See also ==
- Dream Catcher Express, a discontinued train service
