= Rock 'n' Roll Kids =

1994 single by Paul Harrington and Charlie McGettigan

Single by Paul Harrington and Charlie McGettigan
- B-side: "Rock 'N' Roll Kids (Acoustic Mix)"
- Released: 1994
- Songwriter: Brendan Graham

Eurovision Song Contest 1994 entry
- Country: Ireland
- Artists: Paul Harrington and Charlie McGettigan
- Language: English
- Composer: Brendan Graham
- Lyricist: Brendan Graham
- Conductor: None

Finals performance
- Final result: 1st
- Final points: 226

Entry chronology
- ◄ "In Your Eyes" (1993)
- "Dreamin'" (1995) ►

Official performance video
- "Rock 'n' Roll Kids" on YouTube

"Rock 'n' Roll Kids" is a song recorded by Paul Harrington and Charlie McGettigan written by Brendan Graham. It represented Ireland in the Eurovision Song Contest 1994 held in Dublin, where it achieved an unprecedented third consecutive victory for Ireland and the country's sixth in the contest overall.

== Background ==
=== Conception ===
"Rock 'n' Roll Kids" was written by Brendan Graham. Lyrically, the song originally had seven verses, representing various decades including the '60s, '70s, '80s and '90s but on the advice of a DJ, Graham dropped the last two verses as they felt the song was too long. Graham got the inspiration for the title while attending a Fats Domino concert at Dublin's National Stadium in 1991. He entered it in 1992 and 1993 and it failed to get through both times, but was accepted in 1994. According to Graham, "I saw the song as a small song, as a conversation in the kitchen, and I wanted the listeners to be drawn into that kitchen, and into that conversation".

=== Eurovision ===
On 13 March 1994, "Rock 'n' Roll Kids" performed by Paul Harrington and Charlie McGettigan competed in the national selection organised by Raidió Teilifís Éireann (RTÉ) to select its song and performer for the 39th edition of the Eurovision Song Contest. The song won the competition, so it became the Irish entrant — and McGettigan and Harrington the performers — for Eurovision.

There was a myth among Irish media that the song was deliberately chosen not to win. As the contest rules expect the previous year's winner to host the next edition of the contest, the argument runs that RTÉ was not prepared to do this for a third consecutive year, hence the selection; this has never been proven. Even when Ireland hosted the event in 1997, Irish entrant Marc Roberts confirmed that RTÉ wanted him to go out and win it, as they had done a deal with the BBC to host it the following year in case of another Irish victory.

On 30 April 1994, the Eurovision Song Contest was held at the Point Theatre in Dublin hosted by RTÉ, and broadcast live throughout the continent. McGettigan and Harrington performed "Rock 'n' Roll Kids" third on the evening, following Finland's "Bye Bye Baby" by CatCat and preceding Cyprus' "Ime Anthropos Ki Ego" by Evridiki.

At the close of voting, it had received 226 points, placing first in a field of twenty-five, winning the contest. It was the first winning song ever to be performed without orchestral accompaniment, as McGettigan's guitar and Harrington's piano were the only instruments needed. It was also the first time in the contest that a song scored over 200 points, and the first time the same country had won the contest three times in a row. That was Ireland's highest scoring entry at the time, this would be surpassed in 2024 with Bambie Thug and Doomsday Blue.

The song was succeeded as winner in 1995 "Nocturne" performed by Secret Garden representing Norway. It was succeeded as Irish representative that year by "Dreamin'" by Eddie Friel.

=== Aftermath ===
In the Eurovision fiftieth anniversary competition Congratulations: 50 Years of the Eurovision Song Contest, held on 22 October 2005 in Copenhagen, McGettigan and Jakob Sveistrup performed "Rock 'n' Roll Kids" as part of the interval act.

To commemorate the 20th anniversary of their victory, Harrington and McGettigan performed a gig in the Sugar Club in Dublin in 2014. Graham reminisced about the inspiration of the song while accepting his Eurovision trophy: "As I stood on the stage at the Point Depot, through the applause and the cheers, I heard a sound roll in over the Liffey Banks – the sound of a rollin', rumbling piano… and for a moment, I wasn't there. I was back in the Stadium on Bourbon Street, on that steamy Dublin night in 1991. Thank you Fats!"

== Charts ==
=== Weekly charts ===
Chart (1994)	Peak position
Belgium (Ultratop 50 Flanders)	42
Netherlands (Single Top 100)	30
Ireland (IRMA)	2

== Legacy ==
The Father Ted episode "A Song For Europe" is based on the apocryphal story of RTE supposedly selecting "Rock 'n' Roll Kids" with the intent of it losing.

Preceded by "In Your Eyes" by Niamh Kavanagh	Eurovision Song Contest winners 1994	Succeeded by "Nocturne" by Secret Garden
