= Songs from Before =

Songs from Before may refer to:

- Songs from Before (Fionnuala Sherry album)
- Songs from Before (Max Richter album)
