= Songs from Before (Fionnuala Sherry album) =

Studio album by Fionnuala Sherry
- Released: 2010, 2011
- Genre: New instrumental, Celtic
- Label: Hearts of Space Records

Songs from Before is the solo debut from Fionnuala Sherry of the new instrumental duo Secret Garden. The album was self-released in Ireland in November 2010 and was released in June 2011 in North America by Hearts of Space Records, an independent record label owned by Valley Entertainment. The album contains mainly interpretations of traditional Irish songs.

== Track listing ==
1. "An Cuilfhíonn" – traditional - 3:43
2. "Our Wedding Day" – traditional - 4:52
3. "The Lark in the Clear Air" – traditional - 3:53
4. "The Norwegian Minstrel Boy" – Thomas Moore - 3:26
5. "The Crossing" – Kjetil Bjerkestrand – 3:26
6. "Song from Before" – Fionnuala Sherry – 4:07
7. "The Gartan Mother's Lullaby" – Seosamh MacCathmhaoil – 3:40
8. "The Last Rose" – Thomas Moore - 4:00
9. "The Procession" – Fionnuala Sherry – 3:11
10. "My Lagan Love" – traditional - 5:08
