= In Your Eyes (Niamh Kavanagh song) =

1993 song by Niamh Kavanagh

Single by Niamh Kavanagh
- B-side: "In Your Eyes (instrumental)"
- Released: 1993
- Length: 3:10
- Label: Eureyes
- Songwriter: Jimmy Walsh

Eurovision Song Contest 1993 entry
- Country: Ireland
- Artist: Niamh Kavanagh
- Language: English
- Composer: Jimmy Walsh
- Lyricist: Jimmy Walsh
- Conductor: Noel Kelehan

Finals performance
- Final result: 1st
- Final points: 187

Entry chronology
- ◄ "Why Me?" (1992)
- "Rock 'n' Roll Kids" (1994) ►

Official performance video
- "In Your Eyes" on YouTube

"In Your Eyes" is a love ballad recorded by Irish singer Niamh Kavanagh written and composed by Jimmy Walsh. It represented Ireland in the Eurovision Song Contest 1993 held in Millstreet, winning the contest.

== Background ==
=== Conception ===
"In Your Eyes" was written and composed by Jimmy Walsh. In the song, the singer tells how, after being lonely, she has found love and heaven in her lover's arms and how it has changed her.

In 1992, Walsh, who was based in New York, recorded a demo of the song in a studio there. One of the engineers suggested a girl singer who he knew to record it. A then-unknown Idina Menzel came in and listened to the song. She suggested a key change for the chorus as she found it rather flat. Walsh was concerned that this would make the song too difficult to sing, but Menzel insisted she could do it. She duly recorded the demo and this was sent to Niamh Kavanagh, who was recommended to Walsh as being a singer who could handle the difficult ranges within the song. Kavanagh loved it, but was unsure of wanting to compete in the Eurovision Song Contest. Eventually, Walsh said that he would withdraw the song if she did not do it, so she agreed to enter with it.

=== Eurovision ===
On 14 March 1993, "In Your Eyes" performed by Kavanagh competed in the national selection organised by Raidió Teilifís Éireann (RTÉ) to select its song and performer for the 38th edition of the Eurovision Song Contest. The song won the competition so it became the Irish entrant –and Kavanagh the performer– for Eurovision.

Despite winning the national selection, Kavanagh found it difficult to find a record label willing to release the record due to its association with Eurovision. Eventually, she partly funded the recording herself and released it in limited numbers in Ireland under a made-up label name, Eureyes Music. During the run-up to the contest, she met Simon Cowell, who was present with the British entrant Sonia. He signed her up to Arista Records and the song was released internationally by them.

On 15 May 1993, the Eurovision Song Contest was held at the Green Glens Arena in Millstreet hosted by RTÉ, and broadcast live throughout the continent. Kavanagh performed "In Your Eyes" fourteenth on the evening, following Sweden's "Eloise" by Arvingarna and preceding Luxembourg's "Donne-moi une chance" by Modern Times. Noel Kelehan conducted the event's live orchestra in the performance of the Irish entry.

At the close of voting, the song had received 187 points, first in a field of twenty-five, winning the contest. Kavanagh had a home win, since the contest took place in Ireland due to Linda Martin's win the previous year. It was the second of Ireland's three victories in a row in the early 1990s, the third being in 1994 with "Rock 'n' Roll Kids" by Paul Harrington and Charlie McGettigan.

=== Aftermath ===
Kavanagh returned to the contest in 2010 with "It's for You", which came twenty-third out of twenty-five countries in the final (39 in the overall contest), with 25 points.

It was not until 2017, during a documentary on the Irish winners, that Kavanagh learned that the singer on the demo she had heard all those years ago was a young Idina Menzel, who was by then internationally famous.

== Critical reception ==
Alan Jones from Music Week wrote that "the winner of the 1993 Eurovision Song Contest has lots of old-fashioned qualities – it's a good song well sung by a striking colleen". He added, "Kavanagh is a talented and gutsy singer."

== Track listing ==
1. "In Your Eyes" (Walsh) - 3:10
2. "In Your Eyes (instrumental)" (Walsh) - 3:09

== Commercial performance ==
"In Your Eyes" reached No. 1 in Ireland in 1993. It also reached No. 24 in the UK Singles Chart and was a minor hit in the Netherlands and Germany.

=== Weekly charts ===
Chart (1993)	Peak position
Europe (Eurochart Hot 100)	31
Germany (GfK Entertainment Charts)	83
Iceland (Íslenski Listinn Topp 40)	27
Ireland (IRMA)	1
Netherlands (Dutch Top 40 Tipparade)	2
Netherlands (Single Top 100)	42
UK Singles (Official Charts Company)	24

Preceded by (Republic of Ireland) "Why Me?" by Linda Martin	Eurovision Song Contest winners 1993	Succeeded by (Republic of Ireland) "Rock 'n' Roll Kids" by Paul Harrington & Charlie McGettigan
