= Once in a Red Moon =

Studio album by Secret Garden
- Released: 27 December 2001 (Norway)
- Genre: New-age
- Length: 50:20
- Label: Universal / Decca
- Producers: Rolf Løvland; Fionnuala Sherry; Andrew Boland

Secret Garden chronology
| Dawn of a New Century (1999) | Once in a Red Moon (2001) | Earthsongs (2005) |

Once in a Red Moon is the fourth studio album by Secret Garden, excluding the compilation album Dreamcatcher. It was released on 27 December 2001 by Universal Music.

The second track, "You Raise Me Up", has since been recorded by more than 100 other artists. The first track, "Awakening", was inspired by the 1900 novel of the same name by Kate Chopin.

Professional ratings
Review scores
| Source | Rating |
|---|---|
| Allmusic | 4.5/5 stars |

== Track listing ==
| No. | Title | Length |
|---|---|---|
| 1. | "Awakening" | 3:55 |
| 2. | "You Raise Me Up" (feat. Brian Kennedy & Tracey Campbell-Nation) | 5:04 |
| 3. | "Silent Wings" | 3:42 |
| 4. | "Greenwaves" (feat. Karen Matheson) | 4:45 |
| 5. | "Invitation" | 3:58 |
| 6. | "Duo" | 3:57 |
| 7. | "Belonging" | 3:58 |
| 8. | "Gates of Dawn" (feat. Karen Matheson) | 4:29 |
| 9. | "The Promise" | 3:20 |
| 10. | "Fairytale" | 3:27 |
| 11. | "Once in a Red Moon" | 5:01 |
| 12. | "Elegie" | 5:35 |

== Reception ==
Allmusic reviewer Jonathan Widran awarded the album 4.5 stars.

== Guest performers ==
- Guest performers on the second track, "You Raise Me Up", include Brian Kennedy and Tracey Campbell-Nation (vocal), Liam O'Flynn (uilleann pipes and tin whistle), the London Community Gospel Choir, and Irish choral group Anúna.
- The vocalist on track 4, "Greenwaves", is Karen Matheson, lead singer of Scottish band Capercaillie.
- Julian Lloyd Webber plays cello on track 6, "Duo".
- Track 8, "Gates of Dawn", features vocals by Karen Matheson and choral backing by Anúna, who also perform on track 12 "Elegie".

== Personnel ==
- Violin – Fionnuala Sherry
- Keyboards, harmonium & piano – Rolf Løvland (tracks: 1–3, 9 & 11)
- Piano, harmonium, keyboards & organ – Bjørn Ole Rasch (tracks: 2, 5, 8, 10)
- Piano (global C) – Bjørn Ole Rasch, Einar Sogstad & Trond Tellefsen (track: 12)
- Bass – Per Elias Drabløs (tracks: 3–5, 7, 8, 10 & 12)
- Percussion – Noel Eccles (tracks: 3–5, 7, 8, 10 & 12)
- Bagpipes (Uilleann pipes) – Mick O'Brien (tracks: 4 & 5)
- Bagpipes (Uilleann pipes) & tin whistle – Liam O'Flynn (track: 2)
- Cello – Julian Lloyd Webber (track: 6)
- Choir – Anúna (tracks: 2, 8, 12) & London Community Gospel Choir (track: 2)
- Clarinet – John Finucane (track: 11)
- Oboe – Simon Emes (tracks: 4–5, 7, 8, 10 & 12)
- Oboe, Cor Anglais – Simon Emes (track: 3)
- Guitar – Des Moore (tracks: 4, 7, 11 & 12)
- Guitar – Steve Cooney (tracks: 5, 8 & 10)
- Harmonium & keyboards – Kjetil Bjerkestrand (tracks: 4, 7 & 12)
- Harp – Andrea Marlish (track: 3)
- Concert harp – Andrea Marlish (track: 4)
- Irish harp – Laoise Kelly (tracks: 7, 10, 12)
- Nyckelharpa (Keyharp) – Åsa Jinder (tracks: 1, 5, 7–8, 10 & 12)
- Keyboards – Kjetil Bjerkestrand (tracks: 3 & 11)
- Mandolin & guitar – Des Moore (track: 3)
- Whistle – Hans Fredrik Jacobsen (tracks: 3–5, 7–8, 10 & 12), Mick O'Brien (track: 5)
- Willow flute – Hans Fredrik Jacobsen (tracks: 1)
- Zither – Rolf Kristensen (tracks: 4 & 7)
- Backing Vocals – Marian Lisland, Per Øystein Sørensen & Rolf Løvland (tracks: 4 & 8)
- Leader [Gospel Choir Principal] – Bazil Meade (track: 2)
- Leader [Orchestra] – Elaine Clark (tracks: 1–2, 6, 9, 11) & Threse Timoney (tracks: 3–5, 7–8, 10 & 12)
- Members of Orchestra – Irish National Symphony Orchestra, RTÉ Concert Orchestra
- Anúna direction – Michael McGlynn (tracks: 2, 8 & 12)

== Credits ==
- Choir organised coordinator by Yvonne White
- Orchestra organised coordinator by Tommy Kane
- Cover design & booklet – Anne-C. Holm, Sigrid Therese Pfanzelter
- Assistant engineer (Dublin) – Quentin Guiné
- Assistant engineer (London) – Jake Jackson, Ricky Graham (2)
- Mastering – Bjørn Engelmann
- Other (hair) – Benedikte Hansen
- Other (stylist / costumes) – Hilde Ottem Berntsen
- Photographer – Nancy Bundt
- Assistant photographer – Nina Reistad
- Studio snapshots – Secret Garden
- Producer – Fionnuala Sherry
- Producer, composer & arranger – Rolf Lovland
- Recording (Glasgow) – Kim Plannert
- Recording (Kristiansand) – Alf Emil Eik
- Recording (Oslo) – Trond Engebretsen
- Recording, mixing & Co-producer – Andrew Boland

== Notes ==
- Recorded, mixed an co-produced at Windmill Lane Studios, Dublin, Ireland.
- Additional recording:

Cross studio, Kristiansand, Norway
Ambience studios, Oslo, Norway
Secret Studio, Glasgow, Scotland
Air Studio / Lindhurst Hall, London, UK.

- Mastering at Cutting Room, Stockholm, Sweden
- Cover design and booklet at Virtual Garden
- Julian Lloyd Webber (Track 6) appears courtesy of Decca Music Group.
- Karen Matheson (Tracks 4 & 8) appears courtesy of Capercaillie and Vertical Records.
- 'Global C' (Track 12) is a contribution of 66 piano players recorded and mixed together into the final chord.

℗ & © 2002 Universal Music AS, Norway

== Charts ==
| Chart (2002) | Peak position |
|---|---|
| Australian Albums (ARIA) | 64 |
| Norwegian Albums (VG-lista) | 2 |
