= Espen Grjotheim =

Norwegian singer and actor

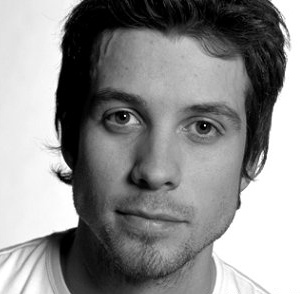
Espen Grjotheim

Espen Grjotheim (born 20 September 1976) is a Norwegian singer and actor from Grimstad, living in Oslo. He has participated in a large number of stage, music and television productions, and has had leading roles in several of the largest musical theater productions in Norway.

He was Norway's first Phantom in The Phantom of the Opera, and has played in productions of Mamma Mia, We Will Rock You, Chess, Les Misérables, Kristina från Duvemåla, Fame, Jesus Christ Superstar, La Cage Aux Folles, In shiny brass. He portrayed Amy Winehouse in the theater concert 27 the club and played the role of Serge in Yasmina Reza's Art.

Grjotheim has also played in the show concerts We love ABBA and Store Norske, both at Edderkoppen Scene in Oslo. He has also participated in several performances outside Norway, including Germany and the United Kingdom.

He has been a guest vocalist for Secret Garden, and has participated in several of their recordings and tours, both nationally and internationally.

He was nominated for the Norwegian Musical Theater Award in 2015 and 2016 and 2019. In 2018, he received Broadway World's regional award for best actor in a musical, for his performance in The Phantom of the Opera.
