= Nocturne (Secret Garden song) =

1995 song by Secret Garden

Single by Secret Garden

from the album Songs from a Secret Garden
- Language: Norwegian
- B-side: "Nocturne (English version)"
- Released: 1995
- Composer: Rolf Løvland
- Lyricist: Petter Skavlan

Eurovision Song Contest 1995 entry
- Country: Norway
- Artists: Fionnuala Sherry; Rolf Løvland
- As: Secret Garden
- With: Gunnhild Tvinnereim; Åsa Jinder; Hans Fredrik Jacobsen
- Language: Norwegian
- Composer: Rolf Løvland
- Lyricist: Petter Skavlan
- Conductor: Geir Langslet

Finals performance
- Final result: 1st
- Final points: 148

Entry chronology
- ◄ "Duett" (1994)
- "I evighet" (1996) ►

Official performance video
- "Nocturne" on YouTube

"Nocturne" is a song recorded by Irish-Norwegian duo Secret Garden—Fionnuala Sherry and Rolf Løvland—with music composed by Løvland and lyrics written by Petter Skavlan. It represented Norway in the Eurovision Song Contest 1995 held in Dublin, resulting in the country's second win at the contest.

For their performance at the contest, they featured three guest musicians: Norwegian vocalist Gunnhild Tvinnereim, Hans Fredrik Jacobsen on penny whistle, and Swedish nyckelharpist Åsa Jinder.

== Background ==
=== Conception ===
"Nocturne" was composed by Rolf Løvland with lyrics by Petter Skavlan. The song is noted for its almost complete absence of lyrics — with only 25 words being sung in the original Norwegian version and much of the rest of the song being given over to a violin intermezzo. Duo Secret Garden, consisting of Fionnuala Sherry and Løvland, recorded the song in Norwegian and English.

=== Eurovision ===
On 1 April 1995, "Nocturne" performed by Secret Garden competed in that year's edition of the Melodi Grand Prix, the national final organised by Norsk Rikskringkasting (NRK) to select its song and performer for the 40th edition of the Eurovision Song Contest. The song won the competition so it became the Norwegian entrant for Eurovision.

On 13 May 1995, the Eurovision Song Contest was held at the Point Theatre in Dublin hosted by Radio Telefís Éireann (RTÉ), and broadcast live throughout the continent. Secret Garden performed "Nocturne" in Norwegian fifth on the night, following Bosnia and Herzegovina's "Dvadeset prvi vijek" by Davorin Popović and preceding Russia's "Kolibelnaya dlya vulkana" by Philip Kirkorov. Secret Garden was accompanied on stage by three guest musicians: Norwegian vocalist Gunnhild Tvinnereim, Hans Fredrik Jacobsen on penny whistle, and Swedish nyckelharpist Åsa Jinder. Geir Langslet conducted the event's live orchestra in their performance.

At the close of voting, it had received 148 points, placing first in a field of twenty-three, and winning the contest. This victory represented the second win for Norway, after winning the 1985 contest with "La det swinge" by Bobbysocks!, and for composer Rolf Løvland, who had also composed that song. Additionally, it represented the first time in four years that Ireland had not won the contest, although Sherry herself is Irish, thus bringing to an end the only hat-trick of victories in Eurovision history. Ireland would go on to win the following Contest, achieving the feat of four victories in five years.

The song was succeeded as winner in 1996 by "The Voice" performed by Eimear Quinn representing Ireland. It was succeeded as Norwegian representative that year by "I evighet" by Elisabeth Andreassen.

=== Aftermath ===
As Norway had previously won the contest in 1985, the second victory allowed the tongue-in-cheek tradition to emerge that Norway could only win in years ending with a five, a joke referred to by the members of Bobbysocks! at the Congratulations: 50 Years of the Eurovision Song Contest special on 25 October 2005, Norway having entered "In My Dreams" that year and not achieved victory.

While no other winning song in the contest has featured so few words, Finland would go on to place 15th in the 1998 contest with "Aava", which contains only six words repeated throughout the song. The previous holder of the record of shortest lyrics in Eurovision history was Belgium and their 1983 entry "Rendez-vous", with a total of 11 words.

== Releases ==
"Nocturne" was not released as a single in Norway; instead, it was released in the rest of Europe and Scandinavia. "Nocturne" is included in Secret Garden's first album, Songs from a Secret Garden. Their 2007 album Inside I'm Singing includes a new version.

== Critical reception ==
Music & Media said that "Nocturne not only meant a victory of music over fast food, but also held an unprecedented first of an essentially instrumental song." Alan Jones from Music Week wrote, "It is a haunting, pastoral piece, owing more to the Gaelic culture of lone violinist Fionnuala Sherry than to Nordic music. With so little in the way of vocals, it barely qualifies as a song. After the initial twenty seconds, the singer lapses into silence for another two minutes, returning only for fifteen seconds at the end."

== Commercial performance ==
The song reached number six in Flanders, number seven in Ireland, number 20 in the Netherlands, number 24 in Wallonia and number 26 in Sweden. In the United Kingdom, the single was released on 2 October 1995 and reached number 90 on the UK Singles Chart the same month.

=== Weekly charts ===
Chart (1995)	Peak position
Belgium (Ultratop 50 Flanders)	6
Belgium (Ultratop 50 Wallonia)	24
Europe (Eurochart Hot 100)	54
Ireland (IRMA)	7
Israel (Israeli Singles Chart)	1
Netherlands (Dutch Top 40)	13
Netherlands (Single Top 100)	20
Sweden (Sverigetopplistan)	26
UK Singles (Official Charts)	90

=== Year-end charts ===
Chart (1995)	Peak position
Belgium (Ultratop 50 Flanders)	35
Israel (Israeli Singles Chart)	15
Netherlands (Dutch Top 40)	167

== Legacy ==
=== Dusty Cowshit version ===
The song was covered comedic and first released as a single by the country-inspired novelty band Dusty Cowshit, reaching number 16 on the Norwegian Singles Chart in 1996.

Chart (1996)	Peak position
Norway (VG-lista)	13

=== In other media ===
"Nocturne" was used in several episodes of TVN soap opera Oro Verde.

Preceded by "Rock 'n' Roll Kids" by Paul Harrington & Charlie McGettigan	Eurovision Song Contest winners 1995	Succeeded by "The Voice" by Eimear Quinn
