= Eimear Quinn =

Irish singer and composer (born 1972)

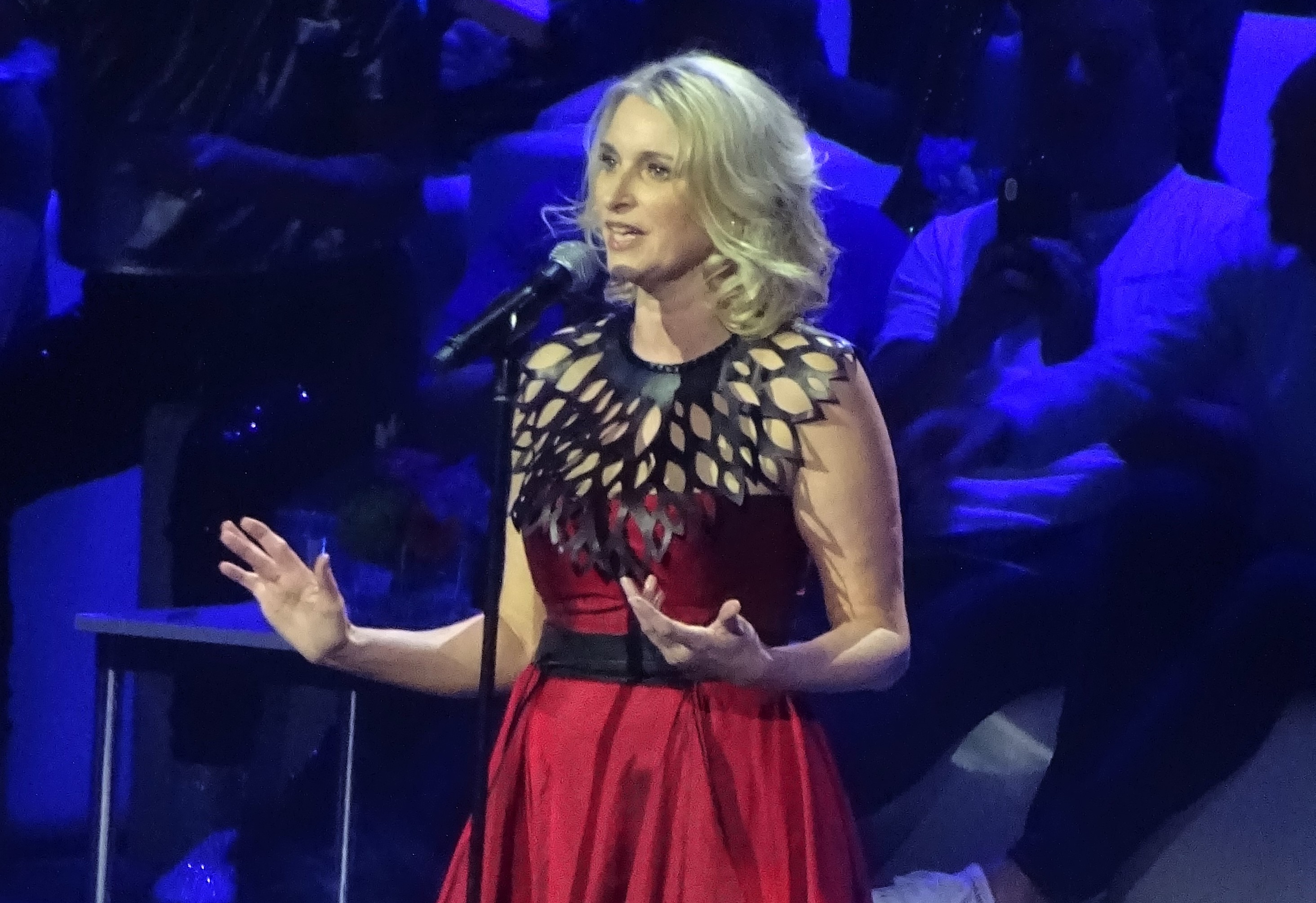
- Eimear Quinn at Het Grote Songfestivalfeest, 2019

Background information
- Born: Eimear Anna Quinn; 18 December 1972 (age 53); Mount Merrion, Dublin, Ireland
- Genre: Celtic
- Occupations: Singer; Composer
- Instrument: Vocals
- Years active: 1992–present
- Label: Decca Classics
- Member of: Anúna
- Website: www.eimearquinn.com

Eimear Mary Rose Quinn (/ˈiːmər/ EE-mər; Irish: Eimear Ní Chuinn, IPA: [ˈɪmʲəɾˠ n̠ʲiː ˈxiːn̠ʲ]; born 18 December 1972) is an Irish singer and composer. She is best known for winning the Eurovision Song Contest 1996 with the song "The Voice". Since then she has toured and performed extensively internationally and has released four albums of her work, the most recent being Ériu, recorded with the RTÉ Concert Orchestra and released in 2020.

== Musical career ==
Eimear Quinn was born in Dublin and joined her first choir at four years of age. At fifteen she started formal vocal training under the tutelage of Jody Beggan. She graduated with a degree in Music from National University of Ireland Maynooth. While studying for her degree she developed an interest in early music and was a founder member of the ensemble Zefiro.

In 1995 she joined the choir Anúna. She recorded two albums Omnis (1996) and Deep Dead Blue (1996), featuring as a soloist on a number of tracks. She also toured internationally with the choir participating in performances in Spain, France and the UK. It was while singing with Anúna in St Patrick's Cathedral in Dublin at Christmas 1995 that songwriter Brendan Graham heard her and invited her to sing his composition "The Voice" as Ireland's entry for the Irish Eurosong competition. Her performance won, and she then travelled to Oslo and was victorious in the Eurovision Song Contest 1996. Quinn began touring solo, performing in Australia, America and all over Europe in venues including The Royal Albert Hall, The Sydney State Theatre and the Forest National Brussels. She also made many television appearances and also presented Television and Radio programming for RTÉ and TV3.

In 2006 Quinn released the album Gatherings, a collection of music she had recorded over the previous decade. This was her third solo disc and followed Winter Fire and Snow and Through the Lens of a Tear, an album she co-wrote with Pol Brennan of Clannad, who also produced the album. Quinn performed "The Voice" later that year while appearing at "Ireland's Finest in Concert", a gala celebration of the 25th anniversary of the National Concert Hall. This performance was broadcast on RTÉ television and the concert has been released as a DVD.

In 2007, Quinn was chosen by the National University of Ireland to promote the studying of Music at NUI Maynooth in a nationwide campaign. The same year she worked with the film-maker, Philip King to complete a documentary on the subject of her music and collaboration with Belfast-born composer, Neil Martin for RTÉ1 Television.

She also appeared on the album 'Yann Derrien' by Spanish artist Carlos Nunez and she toured Europe with Nunez.

December 2007 saw the release of O Holy Night a collection of carols, ancient chants and new compositions from Quinn, who also produced and arranged the album with Martin Quinn at JAM Studios. This led to her presenting a television special A Christmas Celebration with Eimear Quinn on RTÉ1 Television in December 2008.

Since then Quinn has been touring, performing and composing. In 2011 she was asked to perform for England's Queen Elizabeth to mark her State Visit to Ireland. She performed a special concert with the Symphony Orchestra in the National Concert Hall, Dublin in October 2012.

She has also performed at other state occasions such as the Royal Albert Hall event in April 2014 to celebrate the state visit of Irish President Michael D Higgins to the UK, the Visit of Pope Francis to Ireland in 2019, and HRH Prince Charles for St Patricks Day celebrations in London 2019.

Also in 2019 she performed the Eurovision song 'The Voice' to an audience of 10,000 people in the Ziggodome in Amsterdam. In 2020 she appeared on the album 'Natural High' from composer Sarah Class and earlier this year appeared in a tribute to Irish artist Harry Clarke, hosted by the Irish Ambassador to the United Nations in Geneva.

In a radio interview on RTE's Radio 1 in November 2016, she said that, even though she continued to tour, she had scaled back her recording commitments a little after having two children.

Since then she has gone back into the recording studio and released her new album Ériu in 2020. The album features new material she composed either on her own or with acclaimed writers like Brendan Graham, Sarah Class and John Sheehan. Her own composition 'In Paradisum' was chosen by listeners of Classic FM in the UK to become part of the station's "Hall of Fame' for 2021 - one of the few Irish and female composers to make the list. The album was recorded with the RTÉ Concert Orchestra in Dublin.

Her new works are published by Peer Music UK.

== Personal life ==
Quinn is married to Noel Curran, a radio and television producer, former Director-General of RTÉ and current Director-General of the EBU. They have two daughters and divide their time between Ireland and Switzerland.

== Discography ==
=== Albums ===
List of albums, with selected details
Title	Details
Through the Lens of a Tear	Released: 2001; Label: Decca (470 049-2); Format: CD, CS
Gatherings	Released: 2006; Label: Peach Records (PEACH002CD); Format: CD
Oh Holy Night	Released: 2007; Label: Peach Records (PEACH003CD); Format: CD
Ériu	Released: 2020; Label: Peach Records (PEACH005CD); Format: CD
Breath Upon the Flame (with Dublin Brass Ensemble)	Released: July 2023; Label: William Palmer Music; Format: digital
Songs of Winter Dreaming	Released: 15 November 2024; Label: Peach Records; Format: digital

=== Charted singles ===
List of singles, with selected chart positions
Title	Year	Chart positions					
Title	Year	IRL	BEL Fl	BEL Wa	NLD	SWE	UK
"The Voice"	1996	3	9	30	21	31	40

Awards and achievements
Preceded by (Norway) Secret Garden with "Nocturne"	Winner of the Eurovision Song Contest; 1996	Succeeded by (United Kingdom) Katrina and the Waves with "Love Shine a Light"
Preceded by Eddie Friel with "Dreamin'"	Ireland in the Eurovision Song Contest; 1996	Succeeded by Marc Roberts with "Mysterious Woman"
