= Charlie McGettigan =

Irish singer (born 1950)

- Born: Charles Joseph McGettigan; 7 December 1950 (age 75); Ballyshannon, County Donegal, Ireland
- Occupation: Singer
- Label: Stockfisch

Charles Joseph McGettigan (born 7 December 1950, Ballyshannon, County Donegal) is an Irish singer. He lived in 2009 in Drumshanbo, County Leitrim.

== Career ==
Performing with Paul Harrington, he won the Eurovision Song Contest 1994 with the song "Rock 'n' Roll Kids" (words and music by Brendan Graham); the third of a record three consecutive wins by Ireland. Harrington played piano and McGettigan played guitar. He made an appearance as a guest singer at Congratulations, the 50th anniversary concert of Eurovision.

In August 1998, McGettigan's only son, Shane McGettigan, was killed in a construction accident while working in Quincy, Massachusetts.

In 2015, McGettigan wrote "Anybody Got a Shoulder?" for Kat Mahon, which was one of the five songs in Eurosong 2015, the national selection to select the Irish entry for Ireland in the Eurovision Song Contest 2015. The song finished 2nd.

On September 5th, McGettigan released the single Valentine as a collaborative single with upcoming folk singer Collette Brady McEntee, though an earlier track or album version from his project Same Old Someone... was released around 2017. The single with McEntee received airplay on RTE Radio.

In December 2025, McGettigan announced that he would be returning his trophy to the EBU in protest of Israel's participation in the 2026 contest and in solidarity with Nemo who also returned the trophy days earlier.

== Discography ==
=== Albums ===
- Songs of the Night (And Other Stories) (1986)
- Charlie McGettigan (1990)
- Rock 'N' Roll Kids - The Album (together with Paul Harrington) (1994)
- In Your Old Room (1998)
- Another Side of Charlie McGettigan (c. 2002)
- Stolen Moments (2006)
- The Man from 20 (2010)
- Some Old Someone (Stockfisch, 2019)
- Valentine (together with Collette Brady McEntee) (2025)

Awards and achievements
Preceded by (Republic of Ireland) Niamh Kavanagh with "In Your Eyes"	Winner of the Eurovision Song Contest (with Paul Harrington); 1994	Succeeded by (Norway) Secret Garden with "Nocturne"
Preceded by Niamh Kavanagh with "In Your Eyes"	Ireland in the Eurovision Song Contest (with Paul Harrington); 1994	Succeeded by Eddie Friel with "Dreamin'"
