= Des Moore =

Australian economist (1931–2020)

Des Moore (13 December 1931 – 1 November 2020) was an Australian economist and political commentator.

== Career ==
After graduating in law from the University of Melbourne, Australia, and in economics from the London School of Economics, he worked for 28 years in the Commonwealth Treasury. He was deputy secretary of the Federal Treasury until 1987. From 1987 to 1996 he worked for the Institute of Public Affairs. He was also a Councillor at the Australian Strategic Policy Institute.

During his time in the Treasury, Moore headed most of the main policy areas before he left in 1987. Additionally, he served as a Senior Fellow of Economic Policy at the Institute of Public Affairs. Moore was a director of the Institute for Private Enterprise in Melbourne and also a council member of the Australian Strategic Policy Institute. Additionally, he served as a director and a member of the Audit and Risk Management Committee on the boards of the Public Sector Superannuation Scheme (PSS) and Commonwealth Superannuation Scheme (CSS).

In February 1996, he established the Institute for Private Enterprise, a thinktank to promote free enterprise views, and remained its chairman. In recent years he has expressed views on climate warming that contradict scientific evidence and reject the findings of climate scientists and was a proponent and confidant of Christopher Monckton, 3rd Viscount Monckton of Brenchley.

Moore died on 1 November 2020, aged 88.

== Publications ==
- Moore, Des (1986). Developments in Commonwealth-State financial relations. Canberra: Australian National University, Centre for Research on Federal Financial Relations. ISBN 0-7315-0278-7. (43 pages)
- Moore, Des (1989). Australia in hock, the way out. Canberra: Institute of Public Affairs. ISBN 0-909536-10-4. (40 pages)
- Moore, Des (1992). Can monetary policy be made to work?. Institute of Public Affairs Ltd., Economic Policy Unit. ISBN 0-909536-28-7. (116 pages) A paper presented at the IPA Policy Conference, December 1991.
- Institute of Public Affairs; Moore, Des (1992). Schooling Victorians : lessons for the future. A report on government school education in Victoria. Institute of Public Affairs. ISBN 0-909536-34-1. (83 pages)
- Moore, Des (1998). The case for further deregulation of the labour market. Labour Ministers' Council, Australia Department of Employment, Workplace Relations and Small Business. Canberra: Department of Employment, Workplace Relations and Small Business. ISBN 0-642-32491-3. OCLC 222401418. (160 pages)
