= Paul Harrington (musician) =

Irish musician

- Born: 13 May 1960 (age 66); Dublin, Ireland
- Genres: Pop; soul; folk; Irish ballads
- Occupation: Singer-songwriter
- Years active: 1989–present
- Label: Eaton Records

Paul Harrington (born 13 May 1960) is an Irish musician, who, with Charlie McGettigan, won the Eurovision Song Contest for Ireland in 1994; the third of a record three consecutive wins by Ireland.

== Career ==
=== Music ===
Harrington was born in Dublin, Ireland. He attended O'Connells secondary School, North Circular Road Dublin. He first came to public attention with his debut album, What I'd Say, reaching the Top 10 in 1991. However, that attention reached new heights in 1994 when he represented Ireland and won the Eurovision Song Contest along with Charlie McGettigan.

In the late 1990s, Harrington was the performer of choice for a number of the A-list celebrities that would frequent the VIP Room in Lillie's Bordello in Dublin. Here he would regularly entertain and be joined by, stars from the world of music, film and television. He has performed for, amongst others, the Rolling Stones, Prince and U2. It was at this location that Michael Flatley and Harrington reconnected after 10 years. Flatley was so impressed with Harrington that he created a role for him as a principal singer in Celtic Tiger Live. This saw Harrington performing in arenas across Europe and North America, including Wembley Stadium and Madison Square Gardens.

Harrington release A Collection in 2008, and after performing on The Late Late Show, the album entered Ireland's Top 20 reaching number 4.

In 2009, he joined with his brothers as "The Harrington Brothers" to record "Molly Malone" with the Official Leinster Supporters Group. The song became the official anthem for the Leinster Rugby Team. The song entered the Irish Charts in 2009 and was number one in the download charts.

In 2010, Harrington released a live studio album, Songs, featuring his interpretations of some of the world's best-loved songs, and produced by Grammy nominees Chris O’Brien and Graham Murphy. The album also featured Bill Shanley, Sean Devitt, and Tony Molloy.

Harrington released a new live album in 2018 entitled Lights of Home. The album was recorded by Tim Martin at the Sugar Club Dublin, and features nine new songs. Although this will be Harrington's first solo album in eight years, he has collaborated on other albums in that time, including a Christmas album featuring the Whitefriar Street Choir (O Holy Night) and a North American – Irish collaboration called Cape Spear.

=== Television and radio ===
For the last five years, Harrington has had a regular slot on The Pat Kenny Show on Newstalk; The features include "The Popular Irish Ballad – a brief history", also every Tuesday morning "The Lyric's The Thing". Paul Harrington's radio career also includes five years with Dublin's Q102 and two years with Sunshine 106.8, where his duties included presentation, scriptwriting, and voiceover work.

Throughout his career, Harrington has made many television appearances on TV shows and variety shows, including The Lyrics Board. In 2017 and 2018, Harrington wrote and presented the documentary Ireland’s Eurovision Winners, which was released on DVD and is also due to air on television.

In 2018, Harrington was a guest on the popular TV show The Restaurant. He took on the role as an executive chef, where he attained the highest accolade of 5 Star Chef awarded by three-star Michelin chef Marco Pierre White and celebrity chef Rachel Allen.

Awards and achievements
Preceded by (Republic of Ireland) Niamh Kavanagh with "In Your Eyes"	Winner of the Eurovision Song Contest (with Charlie McGettigan); 1994	Succeeded by (Norway) Secret Garden with "Nocturne"
Preceded by Niamh Kavanagh with "In Your Eyes"	Ireland in the Eurovision Song Contest (with Charlie McGettigan); 1994	Succeeded by Eddie Friel with "Dreamin'"
