= Fionnuala Sherry =

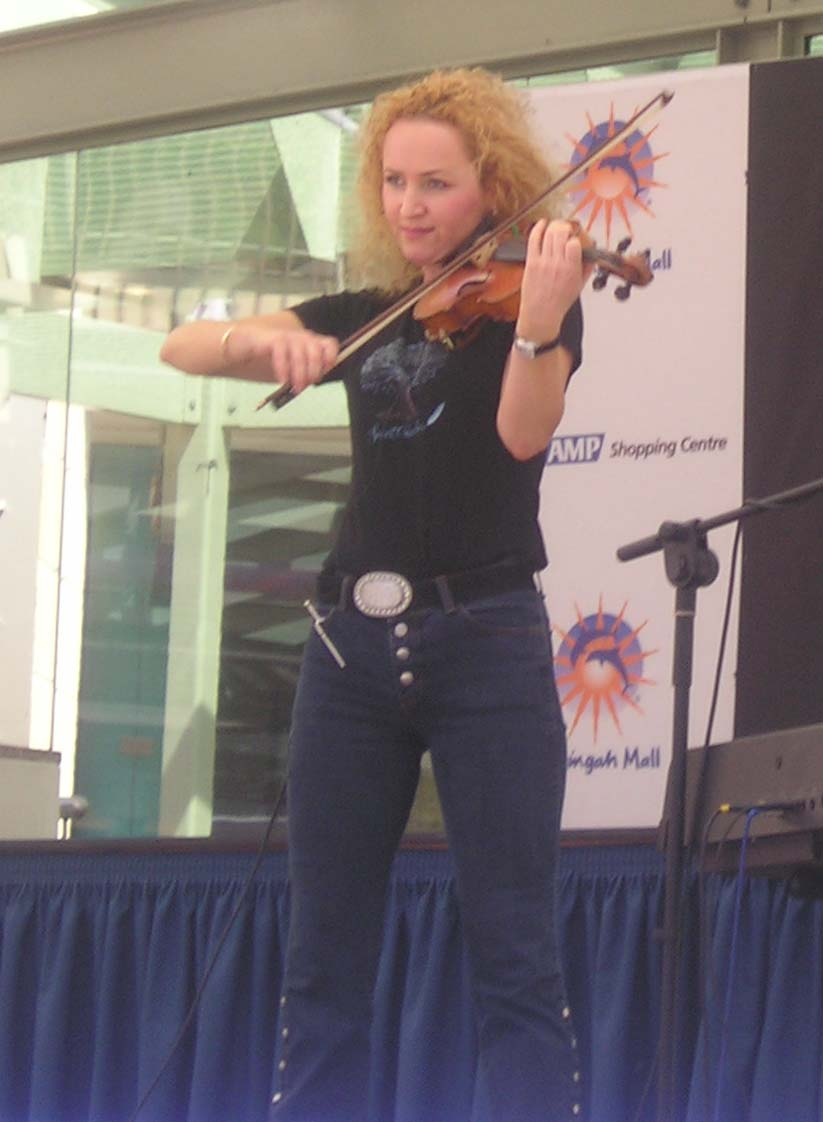

Background information
- Born: 20 September 1962 (age 63); Naas, County Kildare, Ireland
- Genres: New-age
- Occupation: Musician
- Instruments: Violin, vocals
- Years active: 1984–present
- Website: fionnualasherry.com

Fionnuala Sherry (born 20 September 1962) is an Irish violinist and vocalist.

Together with Norwegian musician Rolf Løvland, she makes up the Celtic-Nordic group Secret Garden, which won the Eurovision Song Contest 1995 with the predominantly instrumental piece "Nocturne". As part of Secret Garden, she has released several successful albums that have made the top 10 of Billboard's new-age charts. In 2010, she released her solo album Songs from Before.

== Background ==
Sherry's violin playing started at the age of eight. She graduated with honours from the College of Music of Trinity College, Dublin having moved to Dublin at the age of fifteen in order to continue her musical education. Her professional career started with a ten-year stint as a member of the RTÉ Concert Orchestra.

Sherry has collaborated with a wide range of musicians, including the Chieftains, Sinéad O'Connor, Van Morrison, Chris de Burgh, Bono, Wet Wet Wet, and Westlife. She has also recorded several Hollywood film scores with the Irish Film Orchestra, including A Room with a View, and The Mask.

Her instrument of choice, for both live and studio work, is an English John Edward Betts violin from 1790, with a Hill bow.

== Other media ==
Sherry has written and presented a musical children's television show on Irish national television, based on a concept she invented herself. In 2010, she released the solo album Songs from Before in Ireland. The album was released in 2011 in the United States and Canada by Hearts of Space Records.

== Personal life ==
She married Bernard Doyle, a businessman, in 2010.

== Health struggles ==
Sherry broke both her arms after tripping while walking in Dublin in February 2015. She said it may have serious implications for her musical career, but expressed confidence that she would return to full fitness.

After more than one operation, Sherry was able to begin scheduling concerts at the end of 2015, and commence touring again in 2016. Her experience with this serious injury has caused her to struggle subsequently with stage fright.

In early 2019, Sherry was diagnosed with breast cancer following a routine screening, leading to the cancellation of a worldwide tour. An aggressive tumour was removed in the course of two surgeries, followed by radiation treatment, and a year of the drug Herceptin.

Preceded by Paul Harrington with Charlie McGettigan	Winner of the Eurovision Song Contest; 1995	Succeeded by Eimear Quinn
