= Secret Garden (duo) =

Irish-Norwegian musical group

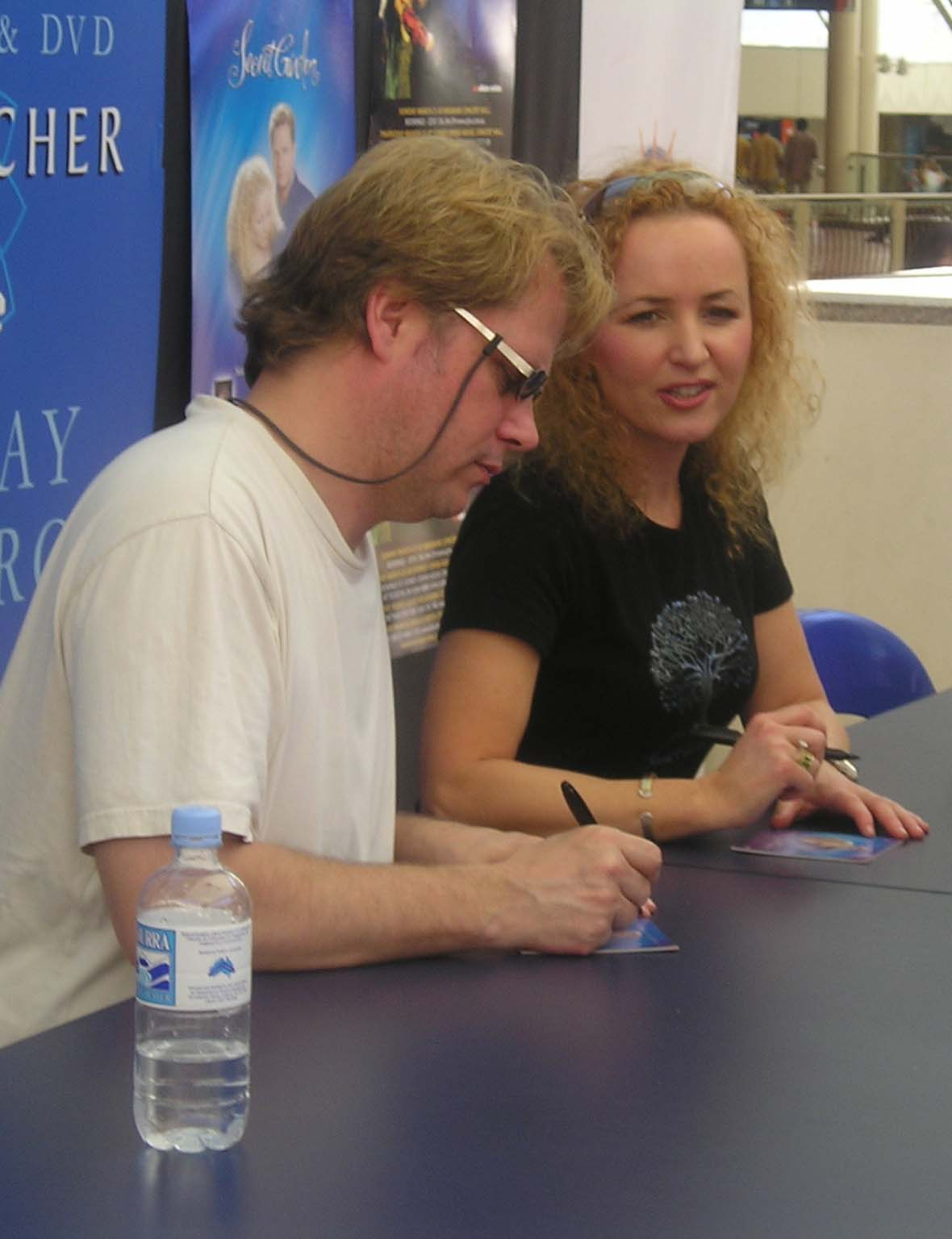
- Rolf Løvland & Fionnuala Sherry

Background information
- Origin: Norway and Ireland
- Genres: Classical, Celtic new age, Nordic folk,
- Years active: 1995–present
- Members: Fionnuala Sherry; Rolf Løvland
- Website: www.secretgarden.no

Secret Garden is an Irish-Norwegian band specialised in new-age music, led by the duo consisting of Irish violinist and singer Fionnuala Sherry and Norwegian composer, arranger and pianist Rolf Løvland.

The group came to fame when they won the Eurovision Song Contest 1995, representing Norway with the composition "Nocturne". In the course of a partnership lasting over 25 years, they have sold millions of albums worldwide, many of which went platinum in numerous countries.

== History ==
=== Eurovision Song Contest ===
The group won the Eurovision Song Contest for Norway's second time in 1995 with the composition "Nocturne". It was the only time that a predominantly instrumental piece has won the Eurovision Song Contest, although a few Norwegian lyrics, written by screenwriter Petter Skavlan, were included to ensure that the entry adhered to the contest's rules. Norwegian singer Gunnhild Tvinnereim sang the song in the Eurovision Song Contest, with Hans Fredrik Jacobsen on penny whistle and Swedish nyckelharpist Åsa Jinder guesting on the occasion, although none of them are regular members of the group. Ten years earlier, Rolf Løvland wrote the song "La det swinge" (Let it swing) that secured Norway its first Eurovision Song Contest victory in 1985.

=== Debut album ===
Their success at Eurovision spearheaded the success of their first album Songs from a Secret Garden. It sold a million copies around the world going platinum in Norway and Korea, gold in Ireland, Hong Kong and New Zealand and spending two years in the Billboard new-age charts in 1996 and 1997. Barbra Streisand adapted "Heartstrings" from this album as the song "I've Dreamed of You" on her A Love Like Ours album. She also used "Heartstrings" in her wedding to James Brolin.

A remastered version of the album was released in 2025 to mark the album's 30th anniversary.

=== Further albums ===
Their sophomore album White Stones followed in 1997, and also made the top ten on Billboard New Age charts. Dawn of a New Century was released in 1999 as their third studio album, and again featured lyrics by Norway's Petter Skavlan. Their 2001 studio album Once in a Red Moon also enjoyed success around the world, including reaching Billboard's new-age top ten.

A compilation album, Dreamcatcher, was released in 2000. Secret Garden released a Dreamcatcher: Best Of album for its tour through Australia and New Zealand in 2004, and this reached the top of the Australian New Age charts and the ARIA top 50 album charts.

After several other albums, they released their tenth album, Storyteller, in 2019.

=== Notable songs ===
Secret Garden's most famous song "You Raise Me Up", originally performed by Johnny Logan and Brian Kennedy, has been recorded by more than a hundred other artists including Josh Groban, Russell Watson, Westlife, Sissel Kyrkjebø, Becky Taylor, Celtic Woman, Lena Park, Robert Tremlett, Il Divo, Rhydian, and Sergio Dalma.

"Nocturne" won the Eurovision Song Contest 1995. Their piece "Adagio", with a cor anglais solo, was used in the Wong Kar-wai film 2046 which was released in 2004.

=== Autobiographical book ===
In 2015, Secret Garden published a book titled You Raise Me Up: The Story of Secret Garden co-written by Rolf Løvland with Fionnuala Sherry. The book tells their story of their triumphs as well as the trials and tribulations they endured along two decades.

== Discography ==
=== Studio albums ===
Year	Album	Peak Positions		
Year	Album	NOR	AUS	US New Age
1996	Songs from a Secret Garden	1	64	5
1997	White Stones	6	—	7
1999	Dawn of a New Century	10	—	4
2001	Once in a Red Moon	2	74	2
2004	Earthsongs	9	51	1
2007	Inside I'm Singing	1	92	
2011	Winter Poem	5	—	5
2013	Just the Two of Us	6	—	7
2019	Storyteller	6	—	7
2024	Songs in the Circle of Time	—	—	—
2025	Songs from a Secret Garden (Remastered 30th Anniversary Edition)	—	—	—

=== Collaboration albums ===
==== With Cathrine Iversen ====
Year	Album	Peak Positions		
Year	Album	NOR	AUS	US New Age
2020	Sacred Night: The Christmas Album	—	—	—

=== Live albums ===
Year	Album	Peak Positions
Year	Album	NOR
2016	Live at Kilden	18

=== Compilation albums ===
Year	Album	Peak Positions	
Year	Album	NOR	AUS
1998	Fairytales	18	—
1999	Highlights	30	—
2000	Dreamcatcher: Best of Secret Garden	—	40
2004	The Ultimate Secret Garden (Asia)	—	—
2018	You Raise Me Up – The Collection	—	—
2020	Nocturne: The 25th Anniversary Collection (Norway)	—	—
2025	Secret Spring	—	—

Awards and achievements
Preceded by (Republic of Ireland) Paul Harrington and Charlie McGettigan with "Rock 'n' Roll Kids"	Winner of the Eurovision Song Contest; 1995	Succeeded by (Republic of Ireland) Eimear Quinn with "The Voice"
Preceded by Elisabeth Andreasson and Jan Werner Danielsen with "Duett"	Norway in the Eurovision Song Contest; 1995	Succeeded by Elisabeth Andreassen with "I evighet"
