= Rolf Løvland =

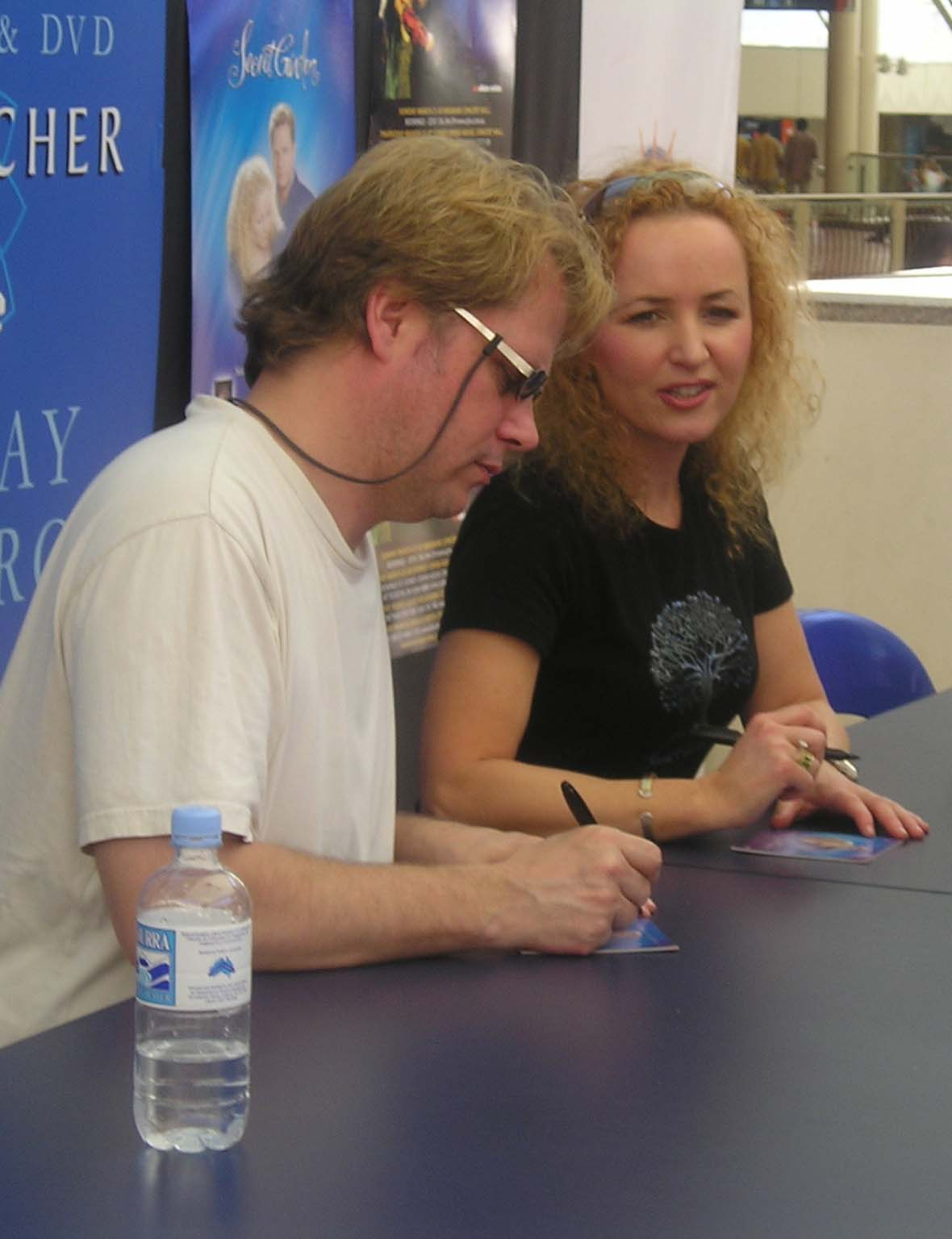
- Rolf Løvland & Fionnuala Sherry

Background information
- Born: Rolf Undsæt Løvland; 19 April 1955 (age 71); Kristiansand, Norway
- Genres: Classical, Celtic, Nordic folk, new-age, pop
- Instrument: Piano

Rolf Undsæt Løvland (born 19 April 1955) is a Norwegian composer, lyricist, arranger, and pianist. Together with Fionnuala Sherry, he formed the Celtic-Nordic group Secret Garden, in which he was the composer, producer, and keyboardist. He began composing at an early age (he formed a band at the age of nine) and grew up studying at the Kristiansand Music Conservatory, later receiving his master's degree from the Norwegian Institute of Music in Oslo.

== Notable songs ==
Løvland has won the Eurovision Song Contest twice, resulting in Norway's first two titles. He composed the song "La det swinge" in 1985. He also composed the song "Nocturne" in 1995, as part of the duo Secret Garden.

He also composed the song "You Raise Me Up". In an interview with Radio Norge in February 2010, Løvland stated that this song had been covered more than 500 times thus far.

Barbra Streisand asked Ann Hampton Callaway to write lyrics to a Rolf Løvland melody which she entitled "I've Dreamed of You", and sang to James Brolin at their wedding. The song was later recorded on her CD, "A Love Like Ours", released as a single and selected for the album, The Essential Barbra Streisand. Streisand performed this song on her live double CD, Timeless.

== Awards ==
- Spellemannsprisen (Norwegian Grammy equivalent)
- Winner of the National radio chart "Song of the year-award"
- Grand Prix winner of the Eurovision Song Contest twice (1985 with "La det swinge" and 1995 with "Nocturne")
- Four times winner of the Norwegian selection for the Eurovision Song Contest, the Melodi Grand Prix.
