= Smash the System: Singles and More =

Greatest hits album by Saint Etienne
- Released: September 2001 (2×CD); May 2005 (CD)
- Recorded: 1990–1999
- Genre: Indie pop
- Length: 146:06 (Singles and More); 63:08 (Singles 1990–99)
- Label: Heavenly
- Producer: Saint Etienne

Saint Etienne chronology
Interlude (2001)	Smash the System: Singles and More (2001)	Asleep at the Wheels of Steel (2002)

Alternative cover
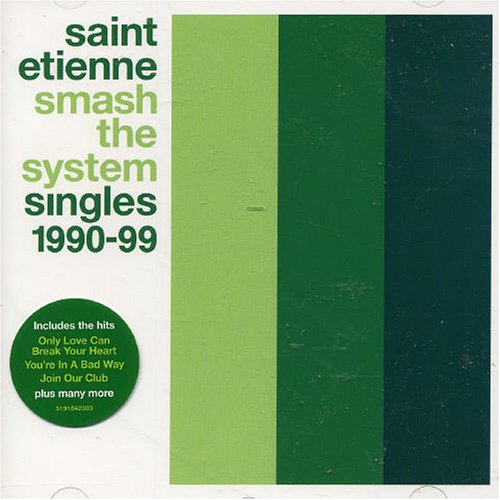
- Cover of Smash the System: Singles 1990–99.

Professional ratings
Review scores
Source	Rating
AllMusic	4.5/5 stars
AllMusic	(re-release)

Smash the System: Singles and More is a double-CD greatest hits album by Saint Etienne, released in 2001. The compilation samples music from most of their releases spanning the years from 1990 to 1999. Most tracks are featured in their single or edit versions, with the exception of "Join Our Club", which is a new mix as the original sounded too "muddy". Smash the System was also going to be the CD debut of "Lover Plays the Bass", but the band "forgot" to include it.

In 2005 the album was re-released as Smash the System: Singles 1990–99 containing only the singles. The newer version is only a single disc and uses a green version of the same artwork. This edition of the album replicates 13 of the 14 tracks that appear on the group's first singles album 1995's Too Young to Die: Singles 1990–1995. Notable differences include the first appearance of the radio edit of "Avenue" on a Saint Etienne album, the 2001 remix of "Join Our Club", the inclusion of the US version of "Kiss and Make Up", and the omission of "I Was Born on Christmas Day". The compilation also has different shorter edits of "Sylvie" and "The Bad Photographer" that do not appear on Smash the System: Singles and More. The version of "Kiss and Make Up" also differs on both compilations, as the version featured on the 2005 edition is slightly shorter than the one included on the 2001 edition.

== Track listing ==
=== 2CD: Heavenly / HVNLP32CD (UK) ===
All tracks are written by Stanley and Wiggs; except where indicated.

Disc one
No.	Title	Writer(s)	Taken from	Length
1.	"Only Love Can Break Your Heart" (Featuring Moira Lambert)	Young	Foxbase Alpha, 1990	4:29
2.	"Kiss and Make Up" (US Version)	Wratten, Hiscock	Foxbase Alpha (US edition), 1991	5:15
3.	"Nothing Can Stop Us"		Foxbase Alpha, 1991	4:20
4.	"Spring"		Foxbase Alpha, 1991	3:44
5.	"Carnt Sleep"		Foxbase Alpha, 1991	4:44
6.	"Filthy" (Featuring Q-Tee)	Stanley, Wiggs, Mais	You Need a Mess of Help to Stand Alone, 1991	5:33
7.	"Join Our Club" (2001 Remix)		You Need a Mess of Help to Stand Alone, 1992	3:16
8.	"People Get Real"		You Need a Mess of Help to Stand Alone, 1992	4:43
9.	"Paper"	Cracknell, Deebank	You Need a Mess of Help to Stand Alone, 1992	4:09
10.	"Avenue"	Catt, Cracknell, Stanley, Wiggs	So Tough, 1992	7:34
11.	"Mario's Cafe"		So Tough, 1993	4:38
12.	"You're in a Bad Way" (Single Version)	Cracknell, Stanley, Wiggs	So Tough, 1993	3:02
13.	"Archway People"		You Need a Mess of Help to Stand Alone, 1993	3:26
14.	"Who Do You Think You Are"	Dyer, Scott	You Need a Mess of Help to Stand Alone, 1993	3:27
15.	"Hobart Paving" (Single Version)		So Tough, 1993	4:51
16.	"Pale Movie"	Cracknell, Stanley, Wiggs	Tiger Bay, 1994	3:46
17.	"Hug My Soul" (Radio Edit)	Batson, Cracknell, Male	Tiger Bay, 1994	3:53
Total length:				75:05

Disc two
No.	Title	Writer(s)	Taken from	Length
1.	"Like a Motorway" (Radio Edit)		Tiger Bay, 1994	3:41
2.	"Cool Kids of Death"		Tiger Bay, 1994	5:39
3.	"The Process"		Continental, 1995	3:11
4.	"He's on the Phone" (Featuring Etienne Daho) (Radio Edit)	Cracknell, Daho, Stanley, Wiggs	Continental, 1995	4:07
5.	"Angel" (Way Out West radio edit)		"Angel / Burnt Out Car" promo release, 1996	4:09
6.	"Burnt Out Car" (Balearico mix)		Continental, 1996	4:19
7.	"Shad Thames"		Continental, 1997	3:33
8.	"Wood Cabin"	Cracknell, Stanley, Wiggs	Good Humor, 1998	4:07
9.	"Sylvie" (Radio Edit)	Cracknell, Stanley, Wiggs	Good Humor, 1998	4:01
10.	"Lose That Girl"	Cracknell, Stanley, Wiggs	Good Humor, 1998	4:03
11.	"The Bad Photographer" (Radio Mix)	Cracknell, Stanley, Wiggs	Good Humor, 1998	3:59
12.	"Goodnight Jack" (Edit)	Cracknell, Stanley, Wiggs	Good Humor, 1998	4:37
13.	"Madeleine"	Cracknell, Wiggs	"The Bad Photographer" single, 1998	3:59
14.	"4.35 in the Morning" (Kid Loco Mix)	Cracknell, Waterfield	"The Bad Photographer" single, 1998	4:37
15.	"Jack Lemmon"		The Misadventures of Saint Etienne, 1999	4:20
16.	"Saturday" (Fugu Mix)	Cracknell, Stanley, Wiggs	The Misadventures of Saint Etienne, 1999	3:21
17.	"52 Pilot"	Cracknell, Stanley, Wiggs	Places to Visit, 1999	5:38
Total length:				71:01

=== CD: Heavenly / HVNLP 52CD (UK) – Smash the System: Singles 1990–99 ===
All tracks are written by Stanley and Wiggs; except where indicated.

No.	Title	Writer(s)	Length
1.	"Only Love Can Break Your Heart" (Featuring Moira Lambert)	Young	4:29
2.	"Kiss and Make Up" (US Version Edit)	Wratten, Hiscock	4:47
3.	"Nothing Can Stop Us"		4:20
4.	"Join Our Club" (2001 Remix)		3:16
5.	"People Get Real"		4:43
6.	"Avenue" (Radio Edit)	Catt, Cracknell, Stanley, Wiggs	3:49
7.	"You're in a Bad Way" (Single Version)	Cracknell, Stanley, Wiggs	3:02
8.	"Who Do You Think You Are"	Dyer, Scott	3:27
9.	"Hobart Paving" (Single Version)		4:51
10.	"Pale Movie"	Cracknell, Stanley, Wiggs	3:46
11.	"Like a Motorway" (Radio Edit)		3:41
12.	"Hug My Soul" (Radio Edit)	Batson, Cracknell, Male	3:53
13.	"He's on the Phone" (Featuring Etienne Daho) (Radio Edit)	Cracknell, Daho, Stanley, Wiggs	4:07
14.	"Burnt Out Car" (Balearico mix)		4:19
15.	"Sylvie" (Radio Edit)	Cracknell, Stanley, Wiggs	3:32
16.	"The Bad Photographer" (Radio Edit)	Cracknell, Stanley, Wiggs	3:19
Total length:			63:08

== Personnel ==
Saint Etienne are:

- Sarah Cracknell (Aries, super, #9 iron)
- Bob Stanley (Capricorn, 36, usual stripped trousers)
- Pete Wiggs (Taurus, young one, like a hurricane)

== Charts ==
Chart performance for Smash the System: Singles and More
Chart (2001)	Peak position
Scottish Albums (OCC)	99
UK Albums (OCC)	84

Chart performance for Smash the System: Singles 1990–99
Chart (2007)	Peak position
UK Budget Albums (OCC)	41
