= List of songs recorded by Saint Etienne =

This is a list of songs released, recorded, performed or written by Saint Etienne.

Song	Release	Year	Notes
"3D Tiger"	B-side	1991	B-side of "Nothing Can Stop Us/Speedwell".
"4:35 in the Morning"	B-side	1998	B-side to "The Bad Photographer"
"52 Pilot"	Places to Visit	1999	Released as a single.
"7 Ways to Love"	Single	1991	Released under moniker Cola Boy
"Action"	Finisterre	2002	Released as a single.
"A Good Thing"	Tales from Turnpike House	2005	Released as a single. Appears in film Volver.
"Amateur"	Finisterre	2002	
"Angel"	Continental	1997	
"Another Cup of Coffee"	Tales from Turnpike House	2005	Released on 2010 Deluxe edition.
"Aqualad"	Tales from Turnpike House	2010	Released on 2010 Deluxe edition.
"Aspects of Lambert"	Sound of Water	2000	
"Avenue"	So Tough	1992	Released as single.
"B92"	Finisterre	2002	
"The Bad Photographer"	Good Humor	1998	Released as a single.
"Barnyard Brou Ha Ha"	Up the Wooden Hills	2005	Available on bonus CD released with "Tales from Turnpike House"
"Bedfordshire"	Up the Wooden Hills	2005	Available on bonus CD released with "Tales from Turnpike House"
"Been So Long"	Good Humor	1998	
"The Birdman of EC1"	Tales from Turnpike House	2005	
"Book Norton"	B-side	2005	B-side to "A Good Thing"
"Boy Is Crying"	Sound of Water	2000	
"The Boy Scouts of America"	Tiger Bay	1994	
"Carnt Sleep"	Foxbase Alpha	1991	
"Chicken Soup"	So Tough	1993	
"Calico"	So Tough	1993	
"Clock Milk"	So Tough	1993	
"Conchita Martinez"	So Tough	1993	
"Cool Kids of Death"	Tiger Bay	1994	
"Date With Spelman"	So Tough	1993	
"Dilworth's Theme"	Foxbase Alpha	1991	
"D.J."	Words and Music by Saint Etienne	2012	
"Don't Back Down"	Sound of Water	2000	
"Downey, CA"	Sound of Water	2000	
"Dutch TV"	Good Humor	1998	
"Driving Home for Christmas"	A Glimpse of Stocking	1995	Cover of Chris Rea song.
"Erica America"	Good Humor	1998	
"Etienne Gonna Die"	Foxbase Alpha	1991	
"Excitation"	Up the Wooden Hills	2005	Available on bonus CD released with "Tales from Turnpike House"
"Filthy"	Single	1991	
"Finisterre"	Finisterre	2002	
"Former Lover"	Tiger Bay	1994	
"Goodnight"	Tales from Turnpike House	2005	
"Goodnight Jack"	Good Humor	1998	
"Girl VII"	Foxbase Alpha	1991	
"Got a Job"	B-side	2005	B-side to "Side Streets"
"Hate Your Drug"	B-side	1994	B-side of "Hug My Soul"
"Haunted Jukebox"	Words and Music by Saint Etienne	2012	
"Heading for the Fair"	Words and Music by Saint Etienne	2012	
"Heart Failed (In the Back of a Taxi)"	Sound of Water	2000	Released as a single.
"He Is Cola"	Single	1991	Released under moniker Cola Boy
"He's on the Phone"	Single	1996	Features Etienne Daho on vocals.
"Here Comes Clown Feet"	So Tough	1993	
"Highgate Road Incident"	B-side	1993	B-side of "Pale Movie"
"Hobart Paving"	So Tough	1993	
"Holiday Song"	Tales from Turnpike House	2010	Released on 2010 Deluxe edition.
"How We Used to Live"	Sound of Water	2000	Released as a single.
"Hug My Soul"	Tiger Bay	1994	Released as a single.
"I Buy American Records"	B-side	1994	B-side of "Hug My Soul"
"I Threw It All Away"	Words and Music by Saint Etienne	2012	
"I'm Too Sexy"	The Fred E.P.	1992	Cover of Right Said Fred song in aid of Terrence Higgins Trust.
"Inside the Hive"	Tales from Turnpike House	2005	Released on 2010 Deluxe edition.
"I've Got Your Music"	Words and Music by Saint Etienne	2012	Released as a single.
"I Was Born on Christmas Day"	Xmas 93	1993	Duet with Tim Burgess of The Charlatans.
"Join Our Club"	Single	1992	
"Junk the Morgue"	So Tough	1993	
"Just a Little Overcome"	Sound of Water	2000	
"Kiss and Make Up"	Single	1991	Cover of The Field Mice song.
"Language Lab"	Finisterre	2002	
"La Poupee Qui Fait Non (No, No, No, No, No)"	B-side	1994	B-side of "Hug My Soul"
"Leyton Art Inferno, The"	Tales from Turnpike House	2005	B-side to "Side Streets"
"Like the Swallow"	Foxbase Alpha	1991	
"Last Days of Disco"	Words and Music by Saint Etienne	2012	
"Last Orders for Gary Stead"	Tales from Turnpike House	2005	
"Late Morning"	Sound of Water	2000	
"Leafhound"	So Tough	1993	
"Let's Build a Zoo"	Up the Wooden Hills	2005	Available on bonus CD released with "Tales from Turnpike House"
"Like a Motorway"	Tiger Bay	1994	Released as a single.
"London Belongs to Me"	Foxbase Alpha	1991	
"Lose That Girl"	Good Humor	1998	Released as a single.
"Lightning Strikes Twice"	Tales from Turnpike House	2005	
"Marble Lions"	Tiger Bay	1994	
"Mario's Cafe"	So Tough	1993	
"Memo to Pricey"	So Tough	1993	
"Method of Modern Love"	Single	2009	
"Milk Bottle Symphony"	Tales from Turnpike House	2005	
"Missing Persons Bureau"	Tales from Turnpike House	2005	B-side to "A Good Thing"
"More You Know, The"	Finisterre	2002	
"Mr Donut"	Good Humor	1998	
"Murder in E Minor"	Tales from Turnpike House	2005	Released on 2010 Deluxe edition.
"Must Be More"	Tales from Turnpike House	2005	Released on 2010 Deluxe edition.
"My Christmas Prayer"	Xmas 93	1993	
"New Thing"	Finisterre	2002	
"Night Owl"	Up the Wooden Hills	2005	Available on bonus CD released with "Tales from Turnpike House"
"No Rainbows for Me"	So Tough	1993	
"Nothing Can Stop Us"	Foxbase Alpha	1991	Released as a single.
"The Official Saint Etienne World Cup Theme"	B-side	1990	B-side of "Only Love Can Break Your Heart".
"Only Love Can Break Your Heart"	Foxbase Alpha	1990	Cover of Neil Young song. Their first release.
"On the Shore"	Tiger Bay	1994	
"Over the Border"	Words and Music by Saint Etienne	2012	
"Pale Movie"	Tiger Bay	1994	Released as a single.
"Popular"	Words and Music by Saint Etienne	2012	
"Postman"	Good Humor	1998	
"The Place at Dawn"	Sound of Water	2000	
"The Process"	He's on the Phone	1996	
"Quiet Essex"	B-side	2005	B-side to "A Good Thing"
"Record Doctor"	Words and Music by Saint Etienne	2012	
"Relocate"	Tales from Turnpike House	2005	Features David Essex on vocals.
"School Run"	Tales from Turnpike House	2005	Released on 2010 Deluxe edition.
"Side Streets"	Tales from Turnpike House	2005	
"Speedwell"	Single	1991	Double A-side with "Nothing Can Stop Us".
"Stars Above Us"	"Tales from Turnpike House"	2005	Single.
"Sun in My Morning"	Tales from Turnpike House	2005	
"Sylvie"	Good Humor	1998	Released as a single.
"Split Screen"	Good Humor	1998	
"Stoned to Say the Least"	Foxbase Alpha	1991	
"She's the One"	Foxbase Alpha	1991	
"Sky's Dead"	B-side	1991	B-side of "Kiss and Make Up".
"Spring"	Foxbase Alpha	1991	
"Stop and Think It Over"	Finisterre	2002	
"Soft Like Me"	Finisterre	2002	
"Summerisle"	Finisterre	2002	
"Sushi Rider"	B-side	1993	B-side of "Like a Motorway"
"Sycamore"	Sound of Water	2000	
"Take Me Home (On a Pushbike)"	Tales from Turnpike House	2005	Released on 2010 Deluxe edition.
"Tankerville"	Tiger Bay	1994	
"Teenage Winter"	Tales from Turnpike House	2005	
"Time and Tide"	B-side	2002	
"He Is Cola"	Single	1991	Released under moniker Cola Boy
"This Is Radio Etienne"	Foxbase Alpha	1991	
"Twenty Five Years"	Words and Music by Saint Etienne	2012	
"Tonight"	Words and Music by Saint Etienne	2012	Released as a single.
"Urban Clearway"	Tiger Bay	1994	
"The Way We Live Now"	Finisterre	2002	
"Western Wind"	Tiger Bay	1994	Based on the folk song "The Western Wynde".
"Who Pays the Rent"	Tales from Turnpike House	2005	Released on 2010 Deluxe edition.
"Wilson"	Foxbase Alpha	1991	
"When I Was Seventeen"	Words and Music by Saint Etienne	2012	
"Wood Cabin"	Good Humor	1998	
"Wood Henge"	Tales from Turnpike House	2005	Released on 2010 Deluxe edition.
"Wouldn't It Be Nice"	MOJO Presents Pet Sounds Revisited	2012	Cover of the Beach Boys song, available with June 2012 issue of Mojo.
"You Can Count on Me"	Up the Wooden Hills	2005	Available on bonus CD released with "Tales from Turnpike House"
"You Can Judge a Book by Its Cover"	B-side	2005	B-side to "Side Streets".
"You Know I'll Miss You When You're Gone"	B-side	1993	B-side of "Like a Motorway"
"You're in a Bad Way"	So Tough	1993	Released as a single.
