= Fairy Tales from Saint Etienne =

Fairy Tales From Saint Etienne

Compilation album by Saint Etienne
- Released: 10 May 1995
- Recorded: 1990–1994
- Genre: Indie pop
- Label: Warner Bros. - WPCR-231
- Producer: Saint Etienne

Saint Etienne chronology
| I Love To Paint (1995) | Fairy Tales From Saint Etienne (1995) | Reserection (1995) |

Professional ratings
Review scores
| Source | Rating |
|---|---|
| Allmusic | 4/5 stars |

Fairy Tales From Saint Etienne (1995) is a compilation album by the British band Saint Etienne which was released only in Japan. It is a mix of album tracks, singles and B-sides.

== Track listing ==
All tracks are written by Stanley and Wiggs; except where indicated

CD: Warner Japan / WPCR-231
| No. | Title | Writer(s) | Length |
|---|---|---|---|
| 1. | "Pale Movie" | Cracknell, Stanley, Wiggs | 3:53 |
| 2. | "This Is Radio Etienne" | | 0:42 |
| 3. | "Only Love Can Break Your Heart" (Featuring Moira Lambert) | Young | 4:29 |
| 4. | "Nothing Can Stop Us" | | 4:20 |
| 5. | "Mario's Cafe" | | 4:39 |
| 6. | "Avenue" | Catt, Cracknell, Stanley, Wiggs | 7:34 |
| 7. | "You're in a Bad Way" | Cracknell, Stanley, Wiggs | 3:08 |
| 8. | "Hug My Soul" | Batson, Cracknell, Male | 4:15 |
| 9. | "Like a Motorway" | | 5:42 |
| 10. | "California Snow Story" | | 4:19 |
| 11. | "Duke Duvet" | | 3:10 |
| 12. | "Join Our Club" | | 3:22 |
| 13. | "Some Place Else" | | 3:41 |
| 14. | "Who Do You Think You Are" | Dyer, Scott | 3:50 |
| 15. | "I Was Born on Christmas Day" (Featuring Tim Burgess) | Catt, Stanley, Wiggs | 3:12 |
