= Too Young to Die: Singles 1990–1995 =

Compilation album by Saint Etienne
- Released: 13 November 1995
- Recorded: 1990–1995
- Genre: Alternative rock, synthpop
- Length: 61:13 (CD/CS/LP); 77:11 (Bonus CD); 63:00 (VHS)
- Label: Heavenly, Wienerworld (VHS)
- Producer: Saint Etienne

Saint Etienne chronology
Tiger Bay (1994)	Too Young to Die: Singles 1990–1995 (1995)	Casino Classics (1996)

Singles from Too Young to Die: Singles 1990–1995
- 1. "He's on the Phone" Released: 6 November 1995

Professional ratings
Review scores
Source	Rating
AllMusic	4.5/5 stars
The Guardian	4/5 stars
Muzik	3.5/5 stars
NME	4/10
Select	5/5 medals

Too Young to Die: Singles 1990–1995 is a compilation album by English indie dance band Saint Etienne released on 13 November 1995, collecting the group's singles spanning the period of 1990 to 1995.

== Background ==
Five tracks were previously unreleased. The track "He's on the Phone" was released as a single just before the album's release. The album peaked at number 17 on the UK Albums Chart and was certified Silver by the BPI (60,000 copies sold).

== Release history ==
The album was released on standard CD, limited edition (10,000 copies) double-CD (with a bonus CD of remixes and an expanded booklet including extra photographs), Cassette, LP and VHS. Artwork was designed by Negativespace with photography by Angus Ashford, Aude Prieur, James Fry, Joe Dilworth, and Paul Kelly.

The initial bonus CD of remixes was re-released as disc-one of the non-limited Double-CD compilation Casino Classics in 1996.

== Reception ==
The album received excellent reviews with critical opinion particularly favourable to the first half of the compilation.

== Track listing ==
All tracks are written by Bob Stanley and Pete Wiggs, except where indicated.

Too Young to Die: Singles 1990–1995 track listing
No.	Title	Writer(s)	Length
1.	"Only Love Can Break Your Heart" (featuring Moira Lambert)	Neil Young	4:29
2.	"Kiss and Make Up" (featuring Donna Savage)	Robert Wratten; Michael Hiscock	4:08
3.	"Nothing Can Stop Us"		4:19
4.	"Join Our Club"		3:15
5.	"People Get Real"		4:43
6.	"Avenue"	Stanley; Wiggs; Sarah Cracknell; Ian Catt	7:33
7.	"You're in a Bad Way" (single version)	Stanley; Wiggs; Cracknell	3:02
8.	"Who Do You Think You Are"	Des Dyer; Clive Scott	3:49
9.	"Hobart Paving" (single version)		4:51
10.	"I Was Born on Christmas Day" (featuring Tim Burgess)	Stanley; Wiggs; Catt	3:08
11.	"Pale Movie"	Cracknell; Stanley; Wiggs	3:53
12.	"Like a Motorway" (radio edit)		3:38
13.	"Hug My Soul" (radio edit)	Cracknell; Guy Batson; Johnny Male	3:53
14.	"He's on the Phone" (featuring Étienne Daho)	Cracknell; Stanley; Wiggs; Daho	5:10

=== Mixes 1990–1995 ===
Too Young to Die: Mixes 1990–1995 track listing
No.	Title	Remixer(s)	Length
1.	"Like a Motorway" (Chekhov Warp Dub)	The Chemical Brothers	9:11
2.	"Join Our Club" (Chemically Friendly Zoom Mix)	Billy Nasty	6:42
3.	"Pale Movie" (Secret Knowledge Trouser Assassin Mix)	Secret Knowledge	10:12
4.	"Speedwell" (Flying Mix)	The Aloof	6:08
5.	"Only Love Can Break Your Heart" (A Mix of Two Halves)	Andrew Weatherall	8:48
6.	"Who Do You Think You Are" (Quex-RD)	Aphex Twin	8:04
7.	"Avenue" (Variety Club Mix)	Gordon King	6:20
8.	"Hug My Soul" (Sure Is Pure Kodacolor House Mix)	Sure Is Pure	8:41
9.	"Like a Motorway" (David Holmes Mix)	David Holmes	12:59

=== Videos 1990–1995 ===
Too Young to Die: Videos 1990–1995 track listing
No.	Title	Length
1.	"Nothing Can Stop Us"
2.	"Avenue"
3.	"Like a Motorway"
4.	"Hobart Paving"
5.	"You're in a Bad Way"
6.	"Who Do You Think You Are"
7.	"Kiss and Make Up" (featuring Donna Savage)
8.	"Hug My Soul"
9.	"I Was Born on Christmas Day" (featuring Tim Burgess)
10.	"Pale Movie"
11.	"Join Our Club"
12.	"Only Love Can Break Your Heart" (featuring Moira Lambert)
13.	"He's on the Phone" (featuring Étienne Daho)

== Personnel ==
The compilation liner notes do not list musician or production credits. The following are adapted from other releases.

- Sarah Cracknell – vocals (all tracks except "Only Love Can Break Your Heart" and "Kiss and Make Up")
- Bob Stanley – keyboards, tambourine
- Pete Wiggs – keyboards, sampler, bongos
- Ian Catt – guitars, keyboard programming
- Moira Lambert – vocals ("Only Love Can Break Your Heart")
- Harvey Williams – bass guitar ("Only Love Can Break Your Heart")
- Donna Savage – vocals ("Kiss and Make Up")
- Debsey – vocals ("Who Do You Think You Are"), backing vocals ("Pale Movie")
- Tim Burgess – vocals ("I Was Born on Christmas Day")
- Siobhan Brookes – backing vocals ("Hug My Soul", "Pale Movie")
- Ian Davies – flamenco guitar ("Pale Movie")
- Spencer Smith – drums ("Hug My Soul")
- Étienne Daho – vocals ("He's on the Phone")

== Charts ==
Chart performance for Too Young to Die: Singles 1990–1995
Chart (1995)	Peak position
Scottish Albums (OCC)	32
UK Albums (OCC)	17
UK Independent Albums (OCC)	2
