= Words and Music by Saint Etienne =

2012 studio album by Saint Etienne

Studio album by Saint Etienne
- Released: 18 May 2012
- Genre: Synth-pop; alternative dance; house; indie pop
- Length: 48:08
- Label: Heavenly; Universal UMC
- Producer: Ian Catt; Nick Coler; Rob Davis; Tim Larcombe; Tim Powell

Saint Etienne chronology
A Glimpse of Stocking (2010)	Words and Music by Saint Etienne (2012)	Home Counties (2017)

Singles from Words and Music by Saint Etienne
- 1. "Tonight" Released: 9 March 2012; 2. "I've Got Your Music" Released: 25 June 2012

Words and Music by Saint Etienne is the eighth studio album by English alternative dance band Saint Etienne, released on 18 May 2012 by Heavenly Recordings. The band announced the album in a Christmas message on their official website on 11 December 2011. The album features collaborations from longtime Saint Etienne associate Ian Catt, as well as Richard X and former Xenomania members Tim Powell and Nick Coler.

== Background ==
According to Saint Etienne's official website, the album is about "how music affects your life. How it defines the way you see the world as a child, how it can get you through bad times in unexpected ways, and how songs you've known all your life can suddenly develop a new attachment, and hurt every time you hear them. More than how it affects and reflects your life though, the album is about believing in music, living your life by its rules."

== Composition ==
The album opens with "Over the Border", a semi-spoken memoir that narrates a first-person coming-of-age tale that is defined by musical milestones. It was the last song recorded for the album, and includes references to the likes of Peter Gabriel, Genesis, Modern English, New Order, Marc Bolan, Top of the Pops, Smash Hits, NME, Factory Records and Postcard Records. The second track "I've Got Your Music" blends "pristine dance-pop keyboards" and "driving electro beats" with Cracknell's "smooth, cool coos", while referencing Donna Summer's 1977 song "I Feel Love". According to lead singer Sarah Cracknell, the song is about "that personal moment of having your own favourite song on your headphones and that feeling of being separate to everything that's going on around you."

"Heading for the Fair", the album's third track, was compared to "the kind of Balearic dance track Boys' Own Records put out in the early 90s", and its lyrics, according to Cracknell, revolve around "[a] girl [who] goes to the fair and meets a guy who spins her round and promises many things and says 'I'll come back next year and we'll run off together' and, of course, next year he just ignores her." Words and Music's fourth track is "Last Days of Disco", a downbeat R&B song featuring symphonic string sections and a "lovely mellifluous" chorus. "Tonight", the fifth track, describes the excitement of attending a gig from a favourite band, incorporating "atmospheric" strings, "butterflies-in-your-stomach" synths and "stuttering" beats.

The sixth track, "Answer Song", was referred to as "a waltzing ballad of epically soulful proportions", and is followed by "Record Doctor", an a cappella song that pays tribute to "a friend blessed with the uncanny ability to find the right song to fit your mood". "Popular", the eighth track, refers to the homonymous music blog run by Pitchfork contributor Tom Ewing, dedicated to reviewing all the UK number-one singles since 1952, with the lyrics namechecking several UK chart-topping titles, including Slade's "Skweeze Me, Pleeze Me", the KLF's "3 a.m. Eternal" and Pussycat's "Mississippi". The track combines "radio-friendly electronics" and Cracknell's "sweet pop-soul vocals". "Twenty Five Years" and "I Threw It All Away"—the album's ninth and twelfth tracks, respectively—are both about bad choices; the latter carries "a hint of baroque pop in its waltz-time and woodwind". Following "Twenty Five Years" is "DJ", which "starts out on the High Street but ends up in the underground club, mixing posh sounding effects and an adrenaline rush of techno synths to play out the song's conceit." It was described as a "nice callback" to the melody of the band's 1994 song "Like a Motorway".

The eleventh track "When I Was Seventeen" is a 1980s rock-inspired number, and its lyrics find Cracknell reminiscing about the time she was living on the King's Road in London at age 17, after having just left home: "I was just having a ball but had no money at all." "Haunted Jukebox" is the album's thirteenth track. Sporting a "mid-'60s soul groove" and "lushly lovely backing vocals", the song's melody and vocal arrangement were perceived by critics as a homage to the Carpenters. Lyrically, the song describes "a blossoming teenage romance built upon a mutual love of records", while noting "how the memories evoked by old music hit harder as you age". Regarding the inspiration behind "Haunted Jukebox", Cracknell said, "There was this bloke I went out with when I was 14, 15. In fact I started my first band with him. And he was really into Adam and the Ants. He once showed me a picture of himself that his sister had taken. And it was him in his bedroom and he'd put a white stripe across his nose. I look back and think, what on earth did I see in him."

== Release ==
A super deluxe edition box set, limited to 1,000 copies, was released in the United Kingdom on 11 June 2012, containing a bonus disc of remixes (also included on the regular deluxe edition) and an exclusive four-track EP, in addition to an enamel badge, four art prints, a giant foldout Ordnance Survey map-style print of the album artwork, and a book packed with photography by Paul Kelly not used in any other format.

In North America, a special edition of the album was released in a cardboard slipcase with a bonus disc titled More Words and Music, featuring ten exclusive tracks. This edition was limited to 3,000 copies, of which 2,700 were sold exclusively on the band's nine-date North American tour in October and November 2012.

The album's cover art is a stylised map of Croydon town centre, designed by Manchester art collective Dorothy. Band member Bob Stanley explained, "They had done this map of a fictional area with all these road names, which were songs. I just got in touch with them and I was like, 'I love this, would you want to do one that was tailor made for us with all of our favorite songs?' They said yes. The general theme of the album is marking a route in your life through music—the idea is that you can follow roads on the map and end up with a playlist of different journeys. There are 312 song titles on the map—it's our hometown."

After being offered as a free download on 24 January 2012, lead single "Tonight" was released as a digital EP on 9 March 2012, and as limited-edition seven-inch and 12-inch vinyl singles on 12 March 2012. "I've Got Your Music" was released as the album's second single on 25 June 2012.

== Critical reception ==
Professional ratings
Aggregate scores
Source	Rating
Metacritic	82/100
Review scores
Source	Rating
AllMusic	4/5 stars
Clash	6/10
DIY	8/10
The Guardian	4/5 stars
The Independent	5/5 stars
MSN Music (Expert Witness)	A−
NME	8/10
Pitchfork	7.8/10
PopMatters	8/10
Spin	7/10

Words and Music by Saint Etienne received widespread acclaim from music critics. At Metacritic, which assigns a normalised rating out of 100 to reviews from mainstream publications, the album received an average score of 82, based on 24 reviews. The Independent's Simon Price praised the album as "a masterclass of pop theory and practice in perfect harmony, often within the same song". AllMusic editor Tim Sendra wrote, "About half the record is drenched in nostalgia, vaguely melancholic and introspective [...] The other half of the album is built on bouncing beats, glittering synths, and Cracknell's feather-light vocals, and is designed to be played over radio waves and in sweaty nightclubs", adding that "[t]hese dual aspects of the record mesh perfectly, often on the same song, and Words and Music turns out to be one of the band's most enriching albums, both musically and emotionally." Kevin Ritchie of Now noted the album has "the vitality of today's top 40 dance-pop but is full of the kind of wisdom, wit and warmth that can only come with age. So many bands are content to ape the style of their predecessors, but Saint Etienne have a voice and sophisticated style all their own." In a review for NME, Dan Martin dubbed the album "the soundtrack to your life" and expressed that "while Saint Etienne will always sound like Saint Etienne, these songs are their sharpest in over a decade."

The Guardian journalist Alexis Petridis stated that the album "frequently sounds as dizzy with the joy of pop as Saint Etienne did 20 years ago". Arnold Pan of PopMatters opined, "What makes Words and Music stand out is that it's both polished and personal, a prime example of how a big pop sound can reach out and connect in the most intimate ways. Perhaps Saint Etienne's most fully realized effort and most engaging listen from beginning to end, Words and Music finds the sweet spot between proficient skill and intuitive feel that can be so elusive in pop music." Pitchfork's Marc Hogan viewed Words and Music as "Saint Etienne's best LP since 1994 masterpiece Tiger Bay", commenting that "[p]art of what's appealing about Words and Music is the way it maintains a contemporary Top 40 sheen without lowering itself to pandering". Ian Wade, writing for BBC Music, called the album "[w]onderful stuff" and described it as "a fantastic and warm collection of jubilant happy/sad pop moments, delivering all that Saint Etienne are known for". DIY's Martyn Young concluded, "There is perhaps no band with a greater appreciation of the sheer joy and thrill of pop music in its purest form than Saint Etienne. Words And Music By Saint Etienne is not only their own unique take on what pop means to them it is also an incredibly fine album in its own right to add to those records that they so revere." Barry Walters of Spin magazine summarised Words and Music as a "sustained, meticulous love letter to pop culture, the ultimate statement from consummate fans". TC of Clash, however, felt that "[t]here's nothing essentially bad about [the album], but the only maturity in their sound is towards a more ambient quarter. Elevator music not quite, but rising out of the background might be an issue."

== Commercial performance ==
Words and Music by Saint Etienne debuted at number 26 on the UK Albums Chart, selling 4,538 copies in its first week.

== Track listing ==
No.	Title	Writer(s)	Producer(s)	Length
1.	"Over the Border"	Sarah Cracknell; Bob Stanley; Pete Wiggs	Ian Catt	5:05
2.	"I've Got Your Music"	Cracknell; Tim Powell; Stanley; Wiggs	Powell; Richard X^{[a]}; Pete Hofmann^{[a]}	3:46
3.	"Heading for the Fair"	Cracknell; Tim Larcombe; Stanley; Wiggs	Larcombe; Catt	3:45
4.	"Last Days of Disco"	Nick Coler; Cracknell; Rob Davis; Stanley; Wiggs	Coler	3:35
5.	"Tonight"	Cracknell; Powell; Stanley; Wiggs	Powell; Richard X^{[a]}; Hofmann^{[a]}	4:37
6.	"Answer Song"	Cracknell; Stanley; Wiggs	Catt; Coler	3:26
7.	"Record Doctor"	Cracknell; Stanley; Wiggs	Catt	0:53
8.	"Popular"	Cracknell; Davis; Merissa Porter; Stanley; Wiggs	Davis	3:23
9.	"Twenty Five Years"	Coler; Cracknell; Stanley; Wiggs	Coler	3:40
10.	"DJ"	Cracknell; Powell; Stanley; Wiggs	Powell; Richard X^{[a]}; Hofmann^{[a]}	4:39
11.	"When I Was Seventeen"	Cracknell; Stanley; Wiggs	Catt	3:37
12.	"I Threw It All Away"	Cracknell; Lawrence Oakley; Stanley; Mark Waterfield; Wiggs	Catt	3:27
13.	"Haunted Jukebox"	Cracknell; Stanley; Wiggs; Debsey Wykes	Coler	4:15
Total length:				48:08

Deluxe edition and super deluxe edition disc two
No.	Title	Writer(s)	Producer(s)	Length
1.	"Tonight" (2 Bears Remix)	Cracknell; Powell; Stanley; Wiggs	Powell; Joe Goddard^{[b]}; Raf Rundell^{[b]}	7:19
2.	"Last Days of Disco" (Erol Alkan's Extended Rework)	Coler; Cracknell; Davis; Stanley; Wiggs	Coler	6:16
3.	"DJ" (Stay+ Remix)	Cracknell; Powell; Stanley; Wiggs	Powell; Stay+^{[a]}^{[b]}	3:45
4.	"I've Got Your Music" (Golden Filter Remix)	Cracknell; Powell; Stanley; Wiggs	Powell; The Golden Filter^{[a]}^{[b]}	7:08
5.	"Popular" (Tom Middleton Cosmos Remix)	Cracknell; Davis; Merissa Porter; Stanley; Wiggs	Davis; Middleton^{[a]}^{[b]}	8:17
6.	"Heading for the Fair" (The Time and Space Machine Waltzer Remix)	Cracknell; Larcombe; Stanley; Wiggs	Larcombe; Catt; Richard Norris^{[a]}^{[b]}	7:57
7.	"Tonight" (Club Clique Remix)	Cracknell; Powell; Stanley; Wiggs	Powell; Club Clique^{[a]}^{[b]}	4:43
8.	"Answer Song" (White Horses Remix)	Cracknell; Stanley; Wiggs	Catt; Dom Thomas^{[a]}; Jez Williams^{[a]}; White Horses^{[b]}	3:37
9.	"Haunted Jukebox" (Summer Camp Remix)	Cracknell; Stanley; Wiggs; Wykes	Coler; Summer Camp^{[a]}^{[b]}	3:26
10.	"I've Got Your Music" (Kisses Remix)	Cracknell; Powell; Stanley; Wiggs	Powell; Kisses^{[a]}^{[b]}	4:22
11.	"DJ" (Muddyloop Remix)	Cracknell; Powell; Stanley; Wiggs	Powell; Muddyloop^{[a]}^{[b]}	4:16
12.	"Last Days of Disco" (Beat Connection Remix)	Coler; Cracknell; Davis; Stanley; Wiggs	Coler; Jordan Koplowitz^{[a]}^{[b]}; Reed Juenger^{[a]}^{[b]}	4:41
Total length:				65:47

Super deluxe edition bonus EP
No.	Title	Writer(s)	Producer(s)	Length
1.	"Record Doctor Dub"	Cracknell; Stanley; Wiggs	Catt	4:40
2.	"Peter Pan"	Cracknell; Stanley; Wiggs	Catt	4:54
3.	"Lion Green"	Stanley; Wiggs	Catt	2:40
4.	"Wouldn't It Be Nice"	Brian Wilson; Tony Asher	Coler	3:12
Total length:				15:26

North American limited edition disc two: More Words and Music
No.	Title	Writer(s)	Producer(s)	Length
1.	"Solid Gold"	Cracknell; Davis; Stanley; Wiggs	Saint Etienne	3:58
2.	"Your Valentine"	Cracknell; Stanley; Wiggs; Wykes	Catt; Saint Etienne	4:54
3.	"Jan Leeming"	Cracknell; Stanley; Wiggs; Wykes	Catt; Saint Etienne	4:36
4.	"Racing Car"	Cracknell; Stanley; Wiggs	Saint Etienne	2:05
5.	"Landscape"	Cracknell; Stanley; Wiggs	Saint Etienne	3:23
6.	"Manhattan"	Scott Walker	Catt; Saint Etienne	4:15
7.	"You're Not Alone"	Catt; Cracknell; Stanley; Wiggs	Catt; Saint Etienne	3:18
8.	"Just Friends"	Amy Winehouse	Catt	3:09
9.	"Fairground Rock and Roll"	Catt; Cracknell; Stanley; Wiggs	Catt; Saint Etienne	2:31
10.	"Lullaby"	Bund; Cracknell	Catt; Saint Etienne	3:38
Total length:				35:41

2020 deluxe reissue bonus disc
No.	Title	Writer(s)	Producer(s)	Length
1.	"Solid Gold"	Cracknell; Davis; Stanley; Wiggs	Saint Etienne	3:58
2.	"Your Valentine"	Cracknell; Stanley; Wiggs; Wykes	Catt; Saint Etienne	4:54
3.	"Jan Leeming"	Cracknell; Stanley; Wiggs; Wykes	Catt; Saint Etienne	4:36
4.	"Racing Car"	Cracknell; Stanley; Wiggs	Saint Etienne	2:05
5.	"Landscape"	Cracknell; Stanley; Wiggs	Saint Etienne	3:23
6.	"Manhattan"	Walker	Catt; Saint Etienne	4:15
7.	"You're Not Alone"	Catt; Cracknell; Stanley; Wiggs	Catt; Saint Etienne	3:18
8.	"Just Friends"	Winehouse	Catt	3:09
9.	"Fairground Rock and Roll"	Catt; Cracknell; Stanley; Wiggs	Catt; Saint Etienne	2:31
10.	"Lullaby"	Bund; Cracknell	Catt; Saint Etienne	3:38
11.	"Pocket Call"	Catt; Cracknell; Stanley; Wiggs; Tobias Lungdren; Marcos Ubeda	Saint Etienne	3:40
12.	"Starlings"	Cracknell; Stanley; Wiggs	Saint Etienne	2:35
13.	"When I Was Seventeen" (single mix)	Cracknell; Stanley; Wiggs	Catt	3:47
Total length:				45:41

=== Notes ===
- ^{^[a]} signifies an additional producer
- ^{^[b]} signifies a remixer

== Personnel ==
Credits adapted from the liner notes of Words and Music by Saint Etienne.

Saint Etienne

- Sarah Cracknell – vocals
- Bob Stanley – keyboards
- Pete Wiggs – keyboards

Additional personnel

- Andrei Basirov – additional programming (tracks 2, 5, 10)
- Ian Catt – production (tracks 1, 3, 6, 7, 11, 12); acoustic guitar (tracks 1, 3, 12); bass (tracks 1, 3, 11, 12); programming (tracks 1, 3, 6, 11); arrangements (tracks 1, 7, 12); electric guitar, robot liaison (track 11); mixing (track 12)
- Leo Chadburn – recorder (track 12)
- Tina Charles – backing vocals (tracks 3, 6, 9)
- Nick Coler – bass, guitar, keyboards, mixing, production, programming (tracks 4, 6, 9, 13)
- Elaine Constantine – band photograph
- CTA Strings – strings (tracks 4, 9)
- Guy Davie – mastering
- Rob Davis – drum programming, guitar, keyboards, mixing, production (track 8)
- Stefan Defilet – strings (tracks 5, 10)
- Travis Elborough – liner notes
- Julian Fernandez – project co-ordination
- Bill Hawkes – strings (tracks 5, 10)
- Pete Hofmann – mixing (tracks 1–3, 5, 10, 11); additional production (tracks 2, 5, 10)
- Martin Kelly – management
- Paul Kelly – photography, sleeve design
- Piotr Kopek – strings (tracks 5, 10)
- Tim Larcombe – production (track 3)
- James McMaster – guitar (track 10)
- Merissa Porter – backing vocals (track 8)
- Tim Powell – keyboards, production, programming (tracks 2, 5, 10)
- Phil Skegg – Song Map
- Nick Squires – strings (tracks 5, 10)
- Rob Walbourne – drums (track 10)
- Andrew Walsh – management
- Richard X – additional production (tracks 2, 5, 10); mixing (tracks 2, 5, 10, 11)

Deluxe edition bonus disc

- Erol Alkan – additional synths, drums, rework (track 2)
- Ian Catt – production (track 6)
- Club Clique – additional production, remix (track 7)
- Nick Coler – mixing, production (tracks 2, 9, 12)
- Rob Davis – mixing, production (track 5)
- Joe Goddard – additional production, remix (track 1)
- The Golden Filter – additional production, remix (track 4)
- Reed Juenger – additional production, remix (track 12)
- Kisses – additional production, remix (track 10)
- Jordan Koplowitz – additional production, remix (track 12)
- Tim Larcombe – production (track 6)
- Tom Middleton – additional production, remix (track 5)
- Muddyloop – additional production, remix (track 11)
- Richard Norris – additional production, remix (track 6)
- Tim Powell – production (tracks 1, 3, 4, 7, 10, 11)
- Raf Rundell – additional production, remix (track 1)
- Stay+ – additional production, remix (track 3)
- Summer Camp – additional production, remix (track 9)
- Dom Thomas – additional production, drums, percussion, synths (track 8)
- White Horses – remix (track 8)
- Jez Williams – additional production, bass, guitar, synths (track 8)

Super deluxe edition box set bonus EP

- Saint Etienne – remix (track 1)
- Ian Catt – production (tracks 1–3); mixing (tracks 2, 3)
- Nick Coler – mixing, production (track 4)
- Debsey – guest vocals (track 4)

== Charts ==
Chart performance for Words and Music by Saint Etienne
Chart (2012)	Peak position
Irish Independent Albums (IRMA)	20
Scottish Albums (OCC)	29
Spanish Albums (PROMUSICAE)	87
Swedish Albums (Sverigetopplistan)	41
UK Albums (OCC)	26
US Heatseekers Albums (Billboard)	26
US Top Dance Albums (Billboard)	18

== Release history ==
Release dates and formats for Words and Music by Saint Etienne
Region	Date	Format	Edition	Label	Ref(s)
Ireland	18 May 2012	CD; digital download	Standard; deluxe	Heavenly; Universal UMC	
United Kingdom	21 May 2012	CD; LP; digital download	Standard	Heavenly; Universal UMC	
United Kingdom	21 May 2012	2-CD; digital download	Deluxe	Heavenly; Universal UMC	
France	21 May 2012	CD; digital download	Standard	Universal	
Italy	21 May 2012	Digital download	Deluxe	Universal	
Sweden	21 May 2012	CD; digital download; LP	Standard	Universal	
Sweden	21 May 2012	2-CD; digital download	Deluxe	Universal	
Germany	22 May 2012	CD	Standard	Universal	
Germany	22 May 2012	Digital download	Standard; deluxe	Universal	
Italy	22 May 2012	CD; digital download	Standard	Universal	
Poland	22 May 2012	CD; LP	Standard	Universal	
Australia	25 May 2012	CD; digital download	Standard	Universal	
Australia	25 May 2012	2-CD; digital download	Deluxe	Universal	
United States	29 May 2012	Digital download	Standard; deluxe	UMe	
Italy	5 June 2012	2-CD	Deluxe	Universal	
Germany	8 June 2012	2-CD + EP	Super deluxe box set	Universal	
United Kingdom	11 June 2012	2-CD + EP	Super deluxe box set	Heavenly; Universal UMC	
United States	24 October 2012	2-CD	Limited	Heavenly	
United Kingdom	7 August 2020	2-CD	Deluxe reissue	Heavenly	
