= Reserection =

EP by Saint Etienne and Étienne Daho
- Released: 29 September 1995
- Recorded: 1995
- Studio: Cat Music (Mitcham, London); Olympic Studios (Barnes, London)
- Genre: Electronica
- Length: 18:11
- Language: French; English
- Label: Virgin
- Producer: Saint Etienne; Étienne Daho

Saint Etienne chronology
Fairy Tales from Saint Etienne (1995)	Reserection (1995)	Too Young to Die: Singles 1990–1995 (1995)

Professional ratings
Review scores
Source	Rating
Smash Hits	2/5

Reserection is an extended play (EP) by English alternative dance band Saint Etienne and French singer Étienne Daho, under the collective name St. Etienne Daho. It was released on 29 September 1995 by Virgin Records.

The title is a portmanteau of the words resurrection and erection, with the former referring to rumours at the time that Daho was HIV-positive, or even that he had already died. The opening track, "Reserection", puts the matter to rest as Daho states that he will rise from his "cendres fiction" ("fictitious ashes") "encore et encore" ("again and again").

The only English song on the EP, "Accident", is a reworked version of Daho's 1984 French-language single "Week-end à Rome", with original English lyrics. Daho's speech from "Reserection" is also reprised within the song. "Jungle Pulse", "X Amours", and "Le Baiser français" are French-language reworkings of Saint Etienne's "Filthy", "Paper", and "Suburban Autumn Lieutenant", respectively.

Originally, the EP's sole single was "Jungle Pulse", but Eurodance producer Steve Rodway subsequently produced a remix of "Accident" that became "He's on the Phone", released as the single from Saint Etienne's first greatest hits compilation, Too Young to Die: Singles 1990–1995.

The band later worked with Daho on the single "Le Premier Jour", from his greatest hits compilation Singles.

== Track listing ==
No.	Title	Writer(s)	Length
1.	"Reserection"	Étienne Daho	0:55
2.	"Jungle Pulse" (performed by Etienne Daho)	Brigitte Fontaine; Daho; Bob Stanley; Pete Wiggs; Tatiana Mais	4:47
3.	"X Amours" (performed by Etienne Daho)	Daho; Sarah Cracknell; Maurice Deebank	3:39
4.	"Accident (Week-end à Rome)" (performed by Sarah Cracknell)	Cracknell; Stanley; Wiggs; Daho	4:34
5.	"Le Baiser Français" (performed by Etienne Daho)	Daho; Stanley; Wiggs	4:16
Total length:			18:11

Japanese and digital edition bonus track
No.	Title	Writer(s)	Length
6.	"Jungle Pulse" (Zdar version; performed by Etienne Daho)	Fontaine; Daho; Stanley; Wiggs; Mais	5:07
Total length:			23:18

== Charts ==
Chart (1995–96)	Peak position
Belgium (Ultratop 50 Wallonia)	22
France (SNEP)	12
UK Albums (OCC)	50

== Release history ==
Region	Date	Format	Label	Ref.
France	29 September 1995	CD	Virgin	
Japan	29 May 1996	CD	Virgin	
France	28 October 2005	Digital download	Parlophone	
France	2 December 2016	LP	Parlophone	
