= I've Been Trying to Tell You =

Studio album by Saint Etienne
- Released: 10 September 2021
- Genre: Pop; ambient pop; sound collage
- Length: 40:08
- Label: Heavenly
- Producer: Augustin Bousfield; Saint Etienne; Pete Wiggs

Saint Etienne chronology
Home Counties (2017)	I've Been Trying to Tell You (2021)	The Night (2024)

Professional ratings
Aggregate scores
Source	Rating
Metacritic	83/100
Review scores
Source	Rating
AllMusic	4.5/5 stars
The Arts Desk	4/5 stars
Clash	8/10
The Irish Times	4/5 stars
The Line of Best Fit	7/10
musicOMH	4/5 stars
Pitchfork	6.9/10
The Scotsman	3/5 stars

I've Been Trying to Tell You is the tenth studio album by English alternative dance band Saint Etienne, released on 10 September 2021 through Heavenly Recordings. The album is set between the "optimistic" years of 1997 and 2001, and contains samples of pop songs from this time along with related field recordings. It was accompanied by a short film directed by photographer Alasdair McLellan that premiered at a BFI Southbank event on 3 September.

== Background ==
The album marks the band's first sample-based record since So Tough (1993). Bob Stanley described it as "about optimism, and the late nineties, and how memory is an unreliable narrator".

== Critical reception ==
I've Been Trying to Tell You received a weighted average score of 83 out of 100 from eight reviews on Metacritic, indicating "universal acclaim". Tim Sendra of AllMusic called it "a concept album that looks to extract the optimistic sound of late '90s mainstream pop and twist it into a suite of songs that feel like the half-remembered afterimages of a dream". Reviewing the album for Pitchfork, Jesse Dorris wrote that the album "feels passive, lost in nostalgia for an age it hasn't fully reckoned with".

== Track listing ==
I've Been Trying to Tell You track listing
No.	Title	Length
1.	"Music Again"	5:45
2.	"Pond House"	4:02
3.	"Fonteyn"	4:50
4.	"Little K"	5:45
5.	"Blue Kite"	4:51
6.	"I Remember It Well"	3:50
7.	"Penlop"	5:30
8.	"Broad River"	5:35
Total length:		40:08

=== Sample credits ===
- "Music Again" samples "Love of a Lifetime" by Honeyz (1998).
- "Pond House" samples "Beauty on the Fire" by Natalie Imbruglia (2001).
- "Fonteyn" samples "Raincloud" by Lighthouse Family (1997).
- "Little K" samples "'Til the Night Becomes the Day" by Samantha Mumba (2000).
- "Penlop" samples "Joy" by the Lightning Seeds (1990).
- "Broad River" samples "Ripped Inside" by Tasmin Archer (1992).

=== Track titles ===
Saint Etienne have said that the track titles are all horses who won races on the day of the 1997 Labour election victory. For example, Broad River won the 4.00 race at Redcar.

== Personnel ==
Credits adapted from the album's liner notes.

=== Saint Etienne ===
- Sarah Cracknell – vocals, production on "Pond House" and "I Remember It Well"
- Bob Stanley – keyboards, production on "Pond House" and "I Remember It Well"
- Pete Wiggs – keyboards, production

=== Additional contributors ===
- Augustin Bousfield – additional keyboards, bass guitar, electric guitar, production on "Pond House" and "I Remember It Well"
- Sam Kelly – vocal engineering
- Guy Davie – mastering
- Alasdair McLellan – photography
- M/M Paris – sleeve

== Charts ==
Chart performance for I've Been Trying to Tell You
Chart (2021)	Peak position
Scottish Albums (OCC)	7
UK Albums (OCC)	14
UK Independent Albums (OCC)	4
