= The Misadventures of Saint Etienne =

Soundtrack album by Saint Etienne
- Released: 1999
- Recorded: Winter 1997
- Genre: Indie pop
- Length: 43:56
- Label: L'Appareil-Photo Bis
- Producer: Saint Etienne

Saint Etienne chronology
Places to Visit (1999)	The Misadventures of Saint Etienne (1999)	Built on Sand (1999)

Professional ratings
Review scores
Source	Rating
AllMusic	4/5 stars

The Misadventures of Saint Etienne is an album by Saint Etienne, released in 1999 only in Japan. It served as the soundtrack to a British indie film called The Misadventures of Margaret, starring Parker Posey.

The soundtrack was recorded during winter 1997 just before the period when the band were starting to promote the Good Humor album, Sarah Cracknell said in an interview with Melody Maker that "Saturday" was being remixed by Trouser Enthusiasts as a possible single release. The single and remix never appeared, and the film itself was only released in Spanish cinemas.

Other tracks recorded for the film (but left off the soundtrack) include "Secret Love", a duet between Cracknell and Posey, "Sadie's Anniversary" and "Half Timbered". The last two were later released on the Places to Visit EP.

== Track listing ==
No.	Title	Writer(s)	Length
1.	"Statues"	Bob Stanley, Pete Wiggs	0:45
2.	"Jack Lemmon"	Ged Adamson, Lee Wilson-Wolfe, Martin Kelly, Sarah Cracknell	4:20
3.	"Paris Bar '89"	Stanley, Wiggs, Cracknell	2:10
4.	"Saturday"	Stanley, Wiggs, Cracknell	2:52
5.	"Dream Dentist"	Stanley, Wiggs, Cracknell	1:40
6.	"Lost in the Library"	Guy Batson, Johnny Male, Cracknell	2:16
7.	"Find Me a Boy"	Françoise Hardy, Roger Samyn	3:49
8.	"Edward Undecided"	Gerard Johnson, Wiggs	1:34
9.	"Martin Court"	Johnson, Wiggs	1:19
10.	"Space Shuttle"	Stanley, Wiggs, Cracknell	0:34
11.	"It's All Gone Horribly Wrong"	Stanley, Wiggs, Cracknell	2:25
12.	"More Statues"	Stanley, Wiggs	0:45
13.	"French Detective"	Stanley, Wiggs, Cracknell	0:44
14.	"Do It All"	Stanley, Wiggs, Cracknell	3:34
15.	"New York Skyline"	Johnson, Wiggs	1:21
16.	"Seventeenth Century Sea"	Stanley, Wiggs	3:40
17.	"In Dreams"	Stanley, Wiggs, Cracknell	2:14
18.	"Lonely Margaret"	Batson, Male, Cracknell	1:18
19.	"The Way I Fell for You"	Ian Catt, Cracknell	4:08
20.	"I'm Here to Mix the Nuns"	Johnson, Wiggs	2:27
