= Tiger Bay (album) =

- Original album cover

Studio album by Saint Etienne
- Released: 28 February 1994
- Recorded: Summer – Autumn 1993
- Genre: Folktronica; techno; alternative dance
- Length: 46:16
- Label: Heavenly – HVNLP8
- Producer: Saint Etienne

Saint Etienne chronology
You Need a Mess of Help to Stand Alone (1993)	Tiger Bay (1994)	Too Young to Die – Singles 1990–1995 (1995)

Singles from Tiger Bay
- 1. "Pale Movie" Released: February 1994; 2. "Like a Motorway" Released: 16 May 1994; 3. "Hug My Soul" Released: 19 September 1994

Reissue album art (1996)
- featuring Giuditta del Vecchio (from the film Léolo)

Tiger Bay is the third studio album by English indie dance band Saint Etienne. It was released 28 February 1994 by Heavenly Recordings. In an interview with Record Collector, band member Bob Stanley stated that the title is a reference to the 1959 film Tiger Bay.

The album is described by Bob Stanley as "an album of modern folk songs done in twentieth century styles like techno and dub". "Like a Motorway", for example, blends Kraftwerk-style techno with the melody from the nineteenth century folk song "Silver Dagger". Some of the songs, such as "Marble Lions" and "Former Lover" forsake electronics for classical folk instrumentation and orchestral arrangements. One, "Western Wind", is a traditional English folk song.

== Background ==
The band wrote most of the songs in the Forest of Dean, in the hope that the countryside would inspire folk ideas. The original intention was for all the songs to be about death.

== Releases ==
Tiger Bay was released in the UK in February 1994. The original cover art is James Clarke Hook's "Welcome Bonny Boat", doctored to include the band members.

The American edition of the album replaced the UK cover art with a photograph of the band smartly dressed at a table. It does not include the "Western Wind"/"Tankerville" suite. In place of the cut songs is the single "I Was Born on Christmas Day" and remixes by Daniel Abraham of "Hug My Soul" and "Like a Motorway".

The Japanese edition of the album was retitled as 哀しみ色のムーヴィー (Pale Movie), and included the bonus tracks "Who Do You Think You Are" and "Pale Movie (Lemonentry Mix)".

Tiger Bay was reissued in 1996 by Creation Records, in part because of Saint Etienne's absence from the music scene, but also because of their formal move to Creation Records. The reissue featured another new cover, this time showing Giuditta del Vecchio (from the film Léolo); the back shows a picture of the group. The inner sleeve was updated, and includes a short commentary on the album by journalist and friend of the group Simon Price, as well as a new selection of photographs with a summery theme. The album itself features a slightly shuffled track listing. "Marble Lions" is moved to appear after "Pale Movie". The second occurrence of "Western Wind" is removed completely; instead "Tankerville" fades into "Boy Scouts of America". "Former Lover" is also edited, although less noticeably, with only the opening guitar chords being removed. The reissue also features four extra tracks – "I Buy American Records", "Grovely Road", "Hate Your Drug" and the single edit of "He's on the Phone".

In 2010 the album was re-released once more. The new deluxe version reinstates the original sleeve art and includes a booklet with an interview with Bob Stanley and additional bonus disc containing a number of demos and all of the B-sides.

== Response ==
Professional ratings
Review scores
Source	Rating
AllMusic	4.5/5 stars
Chicago Tribune	3/4 stars
Entertainment Weekly	B+
NME	4/10
Pitchfork	8.7/10
Q	4/5 stars
Record Collector	5/5 stars
The Rolling Stone Album Guide	3/5 stars
Select	4/5
Vox	8/10

In his review for Select, Stuart Maconie hailed Tiger Bay as Saint Etienne's "best album yet" and highlighted its "almost criminally opulent variety of musical backdrops", while in Vox, Mike Pattenden said that it showed the band "harnessing their encyclopaedic pop knowledge and striving to pull together its diverse strands." Writing for Q, Andrew Collins deemed Tiger Bay an improvement over Saint Etienne's previous albums, citing its "much-needed consistency of pace and style" and "engaging (rather than clever)" music. Trade papers Music Week and Music & Media reacted favourably, with the former appraising it as the band's "most commercial gambit to date" and the latter suggesting "Pale Movie" was "a hit in the waiting room." Chicago Tribune critic Brad Webber complimented the album's "soothing amalgamation of lush instrumentals and hypnotic, house-music beats", and Entertainment Weekly's Michele Romero quipped that with its "beautiful ballads", "perky, disco-ready tunes", and "TV-theme-like music", "Charlie's Angels could have done a lot of jogging to ... Tiger Bay".

NME journalist Paul Moody was less impressed, dismissing Tiger Bay as "kitsch" consisting "purely of half-singles and utterly anonymous ambient-chicanery." Tony Cross of Smash Hits felt it lacked "effort" and noted the presence of "some really bobbins B-sides with token instrumentals." In The Village Voice, Robert Christgau simply listed it as a "dud".

The British release of Tiger Bay was commercially successful and reached #8 on the UK Albums Chart. Three singles were released, but none matched the popularity of those from their previous album. The first, "Pale Movie", peaked at No. 28. "Like a Motorway" was more disappointing, missing the top forty completely and making only No. 47. "Hug My Soul" was released as a two-disc set and managed better, peaking at No. 32.

"Hug My Soul" was the only single that charted in the US and reached No. 40 on the Billboard Hot Dance Club Play chart.

In a 2009 interview, Bob Stanley said that in retrospect the band should have included some more obvious singles on Tiger Bay, to be commercial: "it definitely could have done with a couple more obvious songs". He also acknowledged that the original cover was a commercial mistake.

In a retrospective review for AllMusic, Dave Thompson lauded Tiger Bay as "the peak" of Saint Etienne's early work, and "everything that two generations of post-Beatles wannabes have labored to create, but have always been too in awe to complete: a melding of mood with momentum, emotion with eccentricity, and an endless succession of divine verses sliding into sad and sexy hooks." Pitchfork staff writer Marc Hogan regarded it as "the subtlest, most cinematic, and pretty much indisputably last of Saint Etienne's astounding initial burst of albums", whose "blend of pastoral folk and silvery electronics was worlds apart from Union Jack-waving contemporaries' phony Beatlemania."

== Track listing ==
All tracks are written by Bob Stanley and Pete Wiggs, except where noted.

Original UK release (Heavenly, HVNCD8)
No.	Title	Writer(s)	Length
1.	"Urban Clearway"		3:58
2.	"Former Lover"		3:49
3.	"Hug My Soul"	Guy Batson; Sarah Cracknell; Johnny Male	4:15
4.	"Like a Motorway"		5:42
5.	"On the Shore"		4:06
6.	"Marble Lions"	Mick Bund; Cracknell	4:35
7.	"Pale Movie"		3:52
8.	"Cool Kids of Death"		5:49
9.	"Western Wind"	Traditional	1:33
10.	"Tankerville"		4:01
11.	"Western Wind"	Traditional	1:37
12.	"The Boy Scouts of America"		2:57

US release (Warner Bros., 9 45634-2)
No.	Title	Writer(s)	Length
1.	"Urban Clearway"		3:58
2.	"Hug My Soul"	Batson; Cracknell; Male	4:15
3.	"Former Lover"		3:49
4.	"Like a Motorway"		5:42
5.	"On the Shore"		4:06
6.	"Marble Lions"	Bund; Cracknell	4:35
7.	"Pale Movie"		3:52
8.	"Cool Kids of Death"		5:49
9.	"I Was Born on Christmas Day"	Ian Catt; Stanley; Wiggs	3:11
10.	"The Boy Scouts of America"		2:57
11.	"Hug My Soul" (alternative version)	Batson; Cracknell; Male	4:23
12.	"Like a Motorway" (alternative version)		5:25

UK reissue (Heavenly/Creation, SCR 475962 9)
No.	Title	Writer(s)	Length
1.	"Urban Clearway"		3:59
2.	"He's on the Phone"	Cracknell; Étienne Daho; Stanley; Wiggs	4:06
3.	"Former Lover"		3:37
4.	"I Buy American Records"		2:48
5.	"Hug My Soul"	Batson; Cracknell; Male	4:15
6.	"Like a Motorway"		5:43
7.	"Grovely Road"	Catt; Cracknell	3:38
8.	"On the Shore"		4:06
9.	"Pale Movie"		3:53
10.	"Hate Your Drug"		3:45
11.	"Marble Lions"	Bund; Cracknell	4:35
12.	"Cool Kids of Death"		5:46
13.	"Western Wind"	Traditional	1:32
14.	"Tankerville"		3:52
15.	"The Boy Scouts of America"		3:10

=== 2010 deluxe edition ===
Disc 1 (Heavenly, HVNLP8CDDE / UMC, 2735896)
No.	Title	Writer(s)	Length
1.	"Urban Clearway"		3:58
2.	"Former Lover"		3:49
3.	"Hug My Soul"	Batson; Cracknell; Male	4:15
4.	"Like a Motorway"		5:42
5.	"On the Shore"		4:06
6.	"Marble Lions"	Bund; Cracknell	4:35
7.	"Pale Movie"		3:52
8.	"Cool Kids of Death"		5:49
9.	"Western Wind / Tankerville"		7:12
10.	"The Boy Scouts of America"		2:59

Disc 2
No.	Title	Writer(s)	Length
1.	"Urban Clearway" (demo)		5:32
2.	"Black Horse Latitude"	Cracknell; Stanley; Wiggs	4:23
3.	"I Buy American Records"		2:52
4.	"Hate Your Drug"		3:50
5.	"You Know I'll Miss You When I'm Gone"	Bund; Cracknell	2:59
6.	"Sushi Rider"	Bund; Cracknell	2:58
7.	"Hug My Soul" (demo)	Batson; Cracknell; Male	4:27
8.	"The Wedding of Stacy Dorning"	Cracknell; Stanley; Wiggs	2:49
9.	"Deborah's French Feast"		2:18
10.	"Western Wind" (demo)	Traditional	3:58
11.	"Pale Movie" (demo)		4:29
12.	"La Poupee Qui Fait Non (No No No)"	Michel Polnareff; Geoff Stephens	3:59
13.	"Highgate Road Incident"		2:10
14.	"My Christmas Prayer"	Billy Fury	3:27
15.	"I Was Born on Christmas Day"	Ian Catt; Stanley; Wiggs	3:12

== Personnel ==
=== Original credits (1994) ===
- Saint Etienne – producer
- Ian Catt – engineer
- Recorded at Cat Music, summer – autumn 1993

Saint Etienne

- Sarah Cracknell – vocals, snowboard, scaremonger
- Bob Stanley – keyboards, wulfren, Scouse wit
- Pete Wiggs – keyboards, space blue rinse, saucy git
- Ian Catt – keyboards, guitar, bass guitar, bodlondeb

Additional personnel

- Rick Smith – mixing, programming (at Lemon World) ("Urban Clearway", "Like a Motorway", "Cool Kids of Death")
- Mark 'Spike' Stent – mixing (for SSO Productions) ("Hug My Soul", "Pale Movie")
- 'Jim Bob' Wheatley – engineer ("Hug My Soul", "Pale Movie")
- Original Rockers – rhythms, bass and mixes ("On the Shore", "Western Wind", "Tankerville")
- David Whitaker – orchestral arrangements
- Shara Nelson – vocals ("On the Shore")
- Stephen Duffy – guest vocals ("Western Wind")
- Debsey – backing vocals ("Former Lover", "Pale Movie")
- Siobhan Brookes – backing vocals ("Hug My Soul", "Pale Movie")
- Mick Bund – guitar ("Marble Lions")
- Ian Davies – flamenco guitar ("Pale Movie")
- Mike Patton – guitar ("Former Lover"), mandolin ("On the Shore")
- Kate St John – oboe ("On the Shore")
- Spencer Smith – drums ("Hug My Soul")

Design

- Anthony Sweeney – design
- Peter Mennim – cover painting (after Welcome Bonny Boat by James Clarke Hook)
- Paul Kelly – photos
- Aude Prieur – photos
- Francesca Simon – archive research
- Mr Stripey – in memory of

=== Alternate credits for American release ===
- Tim Burgess – guest vocals ("I Was Born on Christmas Day")
- 'Jim Bob' Wheatley – engineer ("I Was Born on Christmas Day")
- Mark 'Spike' Stent – mixing ("I Was Born on Christmas Day")
- Daniel Abraham – additional production and mix (for White Falcon Productions), additional programming ("Hug My Soul (Alternate Version)", "Like a Motorway (Alternate Version)")
- Merve Depeyer – keyboards, programming ("Hug My Soul (Alternate Version)", "Like a Motorway (Alternate Version)")
- Juan Garcia – overdub engineering ("Hug My Soul (Alternate Version)", "Like a Motorway (Alternate Version)")
- Recorded at Scream Studios, NYC, mixed at Right Track Recording, NYC. ("Hug My Soul (Alternate Version)", "Like a Motorway (Alternate Version)")

=== Additional credits for 1996 British re-release ===
- Recorded summer 1995 ("Grovely Road")
- Recorded at Olympic, summer 1995 ("He's on the Phone")
- 'Jim Bob' Wheatley – engineer ("He's on the Phone")
- Motiv 8 – mix arranged by ("He's on the Phone")
- Etienne Daho appears courtesy of Virgin France ("He's on the Phone")

Design

- Stylorouge – designed at
- Cover photograph from the film Leolo, courtesy of Metro Tartan
- Paul Kelly – band photograph
- Rob O'Connor – inside photographs
- Mr John O'Connor Senior – inside photographs
- Simon Price – liner notes

== B-sides ==
From "Pale Movie"

- "Highgate Road Incident"
- "Pale Movie (Stentorian Dub)"
- "Pale Movie (Secret Knowledge Trouser Assassin Mix)"
- "Pale Movie (Lemonentry Mix)" (Remixed by Rick Smith from Underworld)

From "Like a Motorway"

- "You Know I'll Miss You When You're Gone"
- "Sushi Rider"
- "Like a Motorway (Chekhov Warp Dub)" (Remixed by The Chemical Brothers)
- "Like A Motorway (The David Holmes Mix)"
- "Like A Motorway (Skin Up You're Already Dead Mix)" (Remixed by Autechre)

From "Hug My Soul"

- "I Buy American Records"
- "Hate Your Drug"
- "La Poupee Qui Fait Non (No, No, No, No, No)"
- "Hug My Soul (Twelve Inch Mix)"
- "Hug My Soul (Motiv 8 Blackpool Mix)"
- "Hug My Soul (Sure Is Pure Kodacolour House Mix)"
- "Hug My Soul (Juan Kinky Hernandez Nu Bootz Groove)"
- "Hug My Soul (Secret Knowledge Limbo Mix)"

== Charts ==
Chart performance for Tiger Bay
Chart (1994)	Peak position
European Albums (Music & Media)	30
Scottish Albums (OCC)	17
Swedish Albums (Sverigetopplistan)	31
UK Albums (OCC)	8
UK Independent Albums (OCC)	1
