= He's on the Phone =

1995 single by Saint Etienne

Single by Saint Etienne

from the album Too Young to Die
- B-side: "Groveley Road"; "Is It True"; "The Process"; "How I Learned to Love the Bomb"
- Released: 30 October 1995
- Genre: Handbag house; hi-NRG; Eurodisco; Europop
- Length: 5:10
- Label: Heavenly; MCA
- Songwriters: Sarah Cracknell; Bob Stanley; Pete Wiggs; Étienne Daho
- Producers: Steve Rodway; Saint Etienne

Saint Etienne singles chronology
"Hug My Soul" (1994)	"He's on the Phone" (1995)	"Sylvie" (1997)

Music video
- "He's on the Phone" on YouTube

"He's on the Phone" is a song by British pop group Saint Etienne in collaboration with French singer-songwriter Étienne Daho, released in October 1995 by Heavenly and MCA Records as a single from their third compilation album, Too Young to Die (1995). A fast-paced dance track, it is one of Saint Etienne's biggest hits, reaching number 11 on the UK Singles Chart, number 31 in Iceland, number 41 in Sweden and number 33 on the US Billboard Dance Club Songs chart. The lyrics tell of an "academia girl" trying to escape from a relationship with a married man: He's on the phone / And she wants to go home, / Shoes in hand, / Don't make a sound, / It's time to go. At the centre of the track is a spoken-word section by Daho.

The song is a remix by Motiv8 of "Accident", which appeared on the Saint Etienne/Étienne Daho Reserection EP, released a few months previously in June 1995. "Accident" itself is a rewritten version of Daho's 1984 French-language hit single "Weekend à Rome", with original English lyrics. Daho's spoken-word vocals are from the Reserection opening track, "Reserection". Upon its release, "He's on the Phone" was acclaimed by music critics, many of whom praised its snappy disco beats and Cracknell's vocal performance. It also had the honour of being Pete Tong's essential tune on Radio One.

The single was credited to "Saint Etienne featuring Étienne Daho". Daho also appears in the song's music video, which was directed by Paul Kelly, and joined the band in their performance of the song on Top of the Pops. He would also go on to perform the original "Weekend à Rome" lyrics with the instrumentation from "He's on the Phone" in a performance on the French edition of Star Academy.

== Production ==
According to producer Steve Rodway, the band had never intended to use "Accident" as single material, but had given it to him for remixing as it was "the only new track they had" at the time of the release of Too Young to Die. Rodway retained an edited-down portion of Daho's vocals, and otherwise only kept the opening piano riff from the original instrumentation (both at the band's request).

Sound on Sound magazine describes "He's on the Phone" as characteristic of most of Rodway's "trademark" sounds:

...the bass is a sampled Minimoog, and the driving arpeggios are taken from Steve's Juno 106. The rhythm is again composed of TR909 samples, overlaid with a programmed conga pattern, and the snare only performs fill duties... The high string line is once again from the U220, and pads are supplied by the faithful Wavestation and JD800.

A hard disk recorder was used to create backing vocals echoing the original through time stretching and pitch shifting.

Bob Stanley told Select in 1995 about Daho's contribution to the track, "The stuff he's done on the single we've only heard rough translations of, but it's meant to be pretty obscene. He's massive in France — he's the French George Michael. He spends a lot of time in Britain, and he can't walk through Covent Garden without being mobbed by French tourists. We met him after he came to one of our shows. He's written a book about Françoise Hardy, so that interested us."

== Critical reception ==
Upon its release, Christopher Burns from Associated Press wrote that the song is "truly plastic, shameless Eurodisco with plenty of strings and horns. The hotel life, forget your wife, you're on your own, they sing in 'He's on the Phone'. It's a contrast from the more experimental stuff Saint Etienne has done in the past." Larry Flick from Billboard magazine described it as a "twirlin' U.K. club smash", that with "its deliciously sweet pop hook and adorable girl-group vocals" is "ripe for pop radio picking." He also stated that Motiv8 "kicks a snappy hi-NRG beat on its jiggly remix". James Masterton for Dotmusic named it a "fantastic single", noting that "this is the first time they have ever release an out-and-out pop stomper." He concluded, "One of Britain's most unique bands is finally a major chart force." Swedish Expressen highlighted it as "lovely". Ross Jones from The Guardian stated, "Saint Etienne's marriage to Europop is now official. 'He's on the Phone' has it all – schlurping cymbals, swooping strings, pumping piano, forlorn chords, heartbroken lyrics, ramblings in a foreign tongue..." Taylor Parkes from Melody Maker named it Single of the Week, writing, "This is winter disco, sweet, sad and strong. You don't have to buy it, just believe in it." Brad Beatnik from Music Week's RM Dance Update gave it a score of four out of five, noting that the single has "a very upbeat Euro feel that's both sassy and trashy."

In his Record Mirror dance column, James Hamilton named it a "sweetly enunciated tuneful gentle ditty". John Robinson from NME wrote, "In fact, 'He's on the Phone' is very much entirely standard Etienne — slightly wistful initial melancholia daubed with essence of Peter Purves — and poses the same question: why the Hi-NRG drumbeats of marauding arse?" Another NME editor, Jim Wirth, called it "stunning", adding that the single, with 'Sylvie', are "a stellar amalgamation of handbag house and Bacharachian pop aesthetics." Rob Sheffield from Rolling Stone named it the "perfect" U.K. hit. Gina Morris from Select considered it "a splendid life-affirmating disco tune". Mark Frith from Smash Hits gave it a full score of five out of five and named it Best New Single, writing, "In a strong fortnight for singles, Saint Etienne still manage to be head and shoulders above the rest; [...] 1) It is produced by Motiv 8 who have turned a usually wimpy sounding group into kings of the dancefloor. 2) It's got good "bits": silences, bits in French, ace build-ups. 3) St Etienne never release bad records, apart for their ballads which are uniformly awful. 4) It sounds best really loud." He concluded, "This single is a great big pounding pop classic. Bangin'."

== Chart performance ==
"He's on the Phone" was a notable hit in Europe, peaking at number nine in Scotland and number eleven in the UK. In the latter, it peaked in its first week at the UK Singles Chart, on 5 November 1995, becoming the group's most successful single there. Additionally, it entered the top 40 in Iceland (31), as well as the top 50 in Sweden (41), and on the Eurochart Hot 100, where it peaked at number 44 on November 25. Outside Europe, it was very successful in Israel, peaking at number three in January 1996. In the US, the song made it to a respectable number 33 on the Billboard Dance Club Songs chart.

== Music video ==
The accompanying music video for "He's on the Phone" was directed by English film director, musician, photographer and designer Paul Kelly. It features the group performing at a white set. In some scenes, Cracknell sits on a purple bed by a red telephone on the nightstand. Other scenes shows the singer wandering alone around town at night. Étienne Daho appears in some scenes throughout the video.

== Legacy ==
Retrospectively, Glenn Swan from AllMusic praised the song as "smart", noting that it "once again [are] showcasing the gorgeous voice of Sarah Cracknell and the plaintive Brit-pop songwriting skills of Bob Stanley, Pete Wiggs, and Ian Catt." Tom Ewing of Freaky Trigger featured 'He's on the Phone' in his list of "Top 100 Singles of the 90s" in 1999, saying, "Of course it would take this supremely thoughtful pop group to realise the naive potential of handbag house and then alchemise it into a single which is both their and handbag’s most ravishing five minutes.". John Hamilton from Idolator ranked it among "The 50 Best Pop Singles of 1995" in 2015, remarking that the remixer had "painstaking rearranged Sarah's vocals into a more melodic chorus and injected the track with what can only be described as a high dose of poppers: a galloping bass line, bright keyboards and a relentless nu-disco beat, with Daho's spoken-word passage figuring powerfully in the breakdown."

== Track listings ==
All tracks were written and composed by Cracknell, Stanley, Wiggs, Daho; except where indicated.

- 12-inch: Heavenly / HVN 50-12Pi (UK)
1. "He's on the Phone" (Motiv8 extended mix) — 6:25
2. "He's on the Phone" (Motiv8 dub)
- 12-inch: Heavenly / HVN 50-12Pii (UK)
1. "Cool Kids of Death" (Underworld mix) (Stanley, Wiggs) — 14:31
2. "Like a Motorway" (David Holmes mix) (Stanley, Wiggs) — 13:01
- 12-inch: Heavenly / HVN 50-12Piii (UK)
1. "He's on the Phone" (Bungee Vocal Mix)
2. "He's on the Phone" (Naked Bungee Dub)
- 12-inch: MCA / MCA12-55268 (US)
1. "He's on the Phone" (Motiv8 mix) — 6:26
2. "He's on the Phone" (Primax Bungee dub mix) — 6:03
3. "He's on the Phone" (Primax Bungee vocal mix) — 5:05
- CD: Heavenly / HVN 50CD (UK)
1. "He's on the Phone" — 4:09
2. "Groveley Road" (Stanley, Wiggs) — 3:39
3. "Is It True" (Marc Bolan) — 2:49
4. "The Process" (Stanley, Wiggs) — 3:11
- CD: Heavenly / HVN 50CDR (UK)
1. "He's on the Phone" (Motiv8 mix) — 6:25
2. "Cool Kids of Death" (Underworld remix) (Stanley, Wiggs) — 14:31
3. "How I Learned to Love the Bomb" (Treacy) — 3:05
- CD: MCA / MCADM-55268 (US)
1. "He's on the Phone" (radio edit) — 4:08
2. "He's on the Phone" (Motiv8 mix) — 6:26
3. "He's on the Phone" (Primax Bungee dub mix) — 6:03
4. "He's on the Phone" (Primax Bungee vocal mix) — 5:05
- MC: Heavenly / HVN 50CS (UK)
1. "He's on the Phone" — 4:09
2. "He's on the Phone" (Motiv8 mix) — 6:25

== Charts ==
Chart (1995–1997)	Peak position
Europe (Eurochart Hot 100)	44
Iceland (Íslenski Listinn Topp 40)	31
Israel (Israeli Singles Chart)	3
Scottish Singles Sales (Official Charts)	9
Sweden (Sverigetopplistan)	41
UK Singles (Official Charts)	11
US Dance Club Songs (Billboard)	33
