= Stay Positive =

Stay Positive may refer to:

- Stay Positive (album), an album by The Hold Steady
- "Stay Positive" (The Streets song)
- Stay+, a British band
