= 7 Ways to Love =

Single by Cola Boy
- Released: 24 June 1991
- Genre: Disco; house; Northern soul
- Length: 3:33
- Label: Arista
- Songwriter: Andrew Midgley
- Producer: Saint Etienne

Cola Boy singles chronology
"7 Ways to Love" (1991)	"He Is Cola" (1991)

Music video
- "7 Ways to Love" on YouTube

"7 Ways to Love" is a song by British band Saint Etienne under the name Cola Boy. It features vocals by Janey Lee Grace, is written by Andrew Midgley and was released on 24 June 1991 by Arista Records as a single only. It peaked at number eight on the UK Singles Chart and number one on both the UK Dance Singles chart and the UK Club Chart. Additionally, it was a top-10 hit in Ireland, a top-20 hit in Luxembourg and Switzerland and a top-40 hit in Belgium, Israel and the Netherlands.

== Background and release ==
The song was made by Bob Stanley and Pete Wiggs of Saint Etienne, with Sarah Cracknell singing on the original demo. After an initial pressing of 500 white label copies sold out, it was re-recorded with vocals by Cracknell's friend Janey Lee Grace, a former backing singer of Wham!, as Cracknell was under contract to another label and was not permitted to sing on non-Saint Etienne releases. Stanley and Wiggs were inspired by dance hits that were played in the clubs at the time. Stanley told The Guardian in 2025, "St Etienne did a club tour in early 1991 and we were hearing all these dance hits like DJ H featuring Stefy's 'I Like It' and '(I Wanna Give You) Devotion' by Nomad. We thought: 'Let's go home and write something that will work in a club'. We made the song as basic as possible, with a memorable hook."

The guys pressed the promo records themselves and drove around London dropping them off in various shops. The track was picked up by Arista Records, who wanted to sign them, but they were already on Heavenly Recordings and about to release their first album as Saint Etienne, Foxbase Alpha. Stanley and Wiggs came up with the alias Cola Boy and recruited Stanley's friend Andrew Midgley as Cola Boy, doing appearances in clubs and on TV with Lee Grace. She told in the same interview, "After Bob Stanley and Pete Wiggs of St Etienne called, it took me two hours to get to the session and two hours to get back – and I was only in there for 50 minutes! They just said, "Can you sing, '7 Ways to Love'?" then, "Can you ad-lib?" and then, "You’re done." I was saying: "What about the verse? And the chorus?" But that was it."

== Critical reception ==
Seamus Quinn from NME wrote, "And no, it's nothing to do with the old Hercules classic. This mysterious tune is a kind of modern, uplifting disco number on a one-side only white label. It's being played to death in the clubs, and is probably big because of a kitschy flute riff. Guess what the only sung line is? Yep, you guessed it and it sticks in the head nearly as much as La da dee, La da dum."

Another NME editor, Stuart Maconie, named it Single of the Week, commenting, "Part of me wanted to dislike this, given that it's happening in the clubs' and the style glossies will 'get really into it' and it will generally be loved by the sort og useless ponce who can talk about shoes all evening. Unfortunately it's brilliant. Quite brilliant. Four meaningless words of dialogue, some Balearic conventions as seen by Hanna Barbera and the slight yearning amongst the cheerfulness that all fab pop has. 'Seven Ways to Love' has exactly the same freshness and lightness of touch that make St Etienne's dance tracks the best available. Unsurprisingly, since St Etienne are heavily involved in the production of this little gem. Cybernetic Northern Soul, with precisely the same effect as eating a whole bag of those chewy Fruit Salad sweets in one go. When we eventually get round to having a summer, this will be the record of it." James Hamilton from Record Mirror described it as a "girl cooed title repeating, flute tones tootled and airy synth washed 121.8-122bpm ambient breezy skipper".

== Track listing ==
- 7-inch single, UK & Europe (1991)

A. "7 Ways to Love" — 3:33
B. "7 Ways to Love" (Original Mix) — 3:41

- 12-inch vinyl, UK & Europe (1991)

A. "7 Ways to Love" (Straight to the Cola Boy Head) — 5:08
B1. "7 Ways to Love" (I Pour the Cola) — 5:32
B2. "7 Ways to Love" (Original Mix) — 5:57

- CD single, UK (1991)
1. "7 Ways to Love" — 3:33
2. "7 Ways to Love" (Straight to the Cola Boy Head) — 5:08
3. "7 Ways to Love" (I Pour the Cola) — 5:32
- Cassette single, UK (1991)

A1. "7 Ways to Love
A2. "7 Ways to Love (Original Mix)
B1. "7 Ways to Love
B2. "7 Ways to Love (Original Mix)

== Charts ==
=== Weekly charts ===
Chart (1991)	Peak position
Australia (ARIA)	115
Belgium (Ultratop 50 Flanders)	31
Europe (Eurochart Hot 100)	12
Ireland (IRMA)	7
Israel (Israeli Singles Chart)	31
Luxembourg (Radio Luxembourg)	12
Netherlands (Dutch Top 40)	36
Netherlands (Single Top 100)	40
Switzerland (Schweizer Hitparade)	16
UK Singles (OCC)	8
UK Airplay (Music Week)	17
UK Dance (Music Week)	1
UK Club Chart (Record Mirror)	1
US Hot Dance Club Play (Billboard)	9

=== Year-end charts ===
Chart (1991)	Position
UK Club Chart (Record Mirror)	32
