= Places to Visit =

EP by Saint Etienne
- Released: May 1999
- Recorded: Needham Sound, Maida Vale; Protocol, North London; Cat Studios, Mitcham; Treecastle, Forest Hill
- Genre: Electronica
- Length: 21:28
- Label: Sub Pop; Bungalow
- Producer: Saint Etienne; Jim O'Rourke; Gerard Johnson

Saint Etienne chronology
Fairfax High (1999)	Places to Visit (1999)	The Misadventures of Saint Etienne (1999)

Singles from Places to Visit
- 1. "52 Pilot" b/w "Garage for Gunther" Released: 1999

Places to Visit is an extended play released by British group Saint Etienne in May 1999. It shows the band moving toward the experimental electronic sound that they explored further on their next official full-length release, 2000's Sound of Water.

Originally released in 1999 in the US only on Sub Pop, German label Bungalow released a vinyl version in 2000. The German release included as a bonus track "Garage for Gunther", the B-side to "52 Pilot".

The EP appeared in its entirety on the second disc of the 2009 deluxe edition reissue of Sound of Water, also marking the first UK release of the tracks.

"Sadie's Anniversary" and "Half Timbered" are tracks omitted from the Misadventures Of Margaret soundtrack. Sadie is incidentally the name of the band's longtime backing singer's daughter. Debsey, the backing singer, has been with the band since the early days of them performing live. She is also Sarah Cracknell's sister-in-law.

"We're in the City" is featured in the 1999 film But I'm a Cheerleader.

== Reception ==
Professional ratings
Review scores
Source	Rating
Allmusic	2.5/5 stars
NME	5/10
Pitchfork Media	6.4/10
Robert Christgau	(dud)

Places to Visit received mixed reviews from the majority of critics.

== Track listing ==
=== CD: Sub Pop / SPCD 466 ===
All tracks are written by Cracknell, Stanley, Wiggs.

Side one
No.	Title	Length
1.	"Ivyhouse"	2:07
2.	"52 Pilot"	5:38
3.	"We're in the City"	4:41
4.	"Artieripp"	4:46
5.	"Sadie's Anniversary"	3:01
6.	"Half Timbered"	1:19

=== LP: Bungalow / bung074 ===
All tracks are written by Cracknell, Stanley, Wiggs.

Side one
No.	Title	Length
1.	"Ivyhouse"	2:07
2.	"52 Pilot"	5:38
3.	"We're in the City"	4:41

Side two
No.	Title	Length
4.	"Artieripp"	4:46
5.	"Sadie's Anniversary"	3:01
6.	"Half Timbered"	1:19
7.	"Garage for Gunther"	3:49

== Personnel ==
Saint Etienne

- Sarah Cracknell - Vocals, Wurlitzer, Beetle Bailey
- Bob Stanley - Keyboards, Cymbaline, Four Bagger
- Pete Wiggs - Keyboards, Black Island, Turkey

Additional personnel

- Ian Catt - Keyboards, E-bow
- Charlotte Hodson, Mitch Stevenson - Backing Vocals
- Gerard Johnson - Keyboards, Piano
- Ian Masterson - Programming
- John Miller - Drums
- Dominic Murcott - Vibes, Marimba
- Sean O'Hagan - Bass, 12 String Guitar, Organ
- Jim O'Rourke - Electronic Wizardry
- The Trouser Enthusiast - Engineer ("We're in the City")
