= Too Young to Die =

Too Young to Die may refer to:

- Too Young to Die?, a 1990 film starring Brad Pitt
- Too Young to Die (2002 film), a 2002 South Korean film directed by Park Jin-pyo
- Too Young to Die or The Suspicious Death of a Minor, a 1975 Italian giallo mystery film
- "Too Young to Die" (song), a song by Jamiroquai
- Too Young to Die: Singles 1990–1995, a 1995 compilation album by Saint Etienne
- Too Young to Die (novel), a young adult novel by Lurlene McDaniel
- Too Young to Die! Wakakushite Shinu, a 2016 Japanese film directed by Kankurō Kudō
