= Xmas 93 =

Single by Saint Etienne
- A-side: "I Was Born on Christmas Day"
- B-side: "My Christmas Prayer"; "Snowplough"; "Peterloo"
- Released: 6 December 1993
- Studio: Cat Music (Mitcham, London)
- Genre: House
- Length: 14:52
- Label: Heavenly
- Songwriters: Bob Stanley; Pete Wiggs
- Producer: Saint Etienne

Saint Etienne singles chronology
"Hobart Paving" (1993)	"Xmas 93" (1993)	"Pale Movie" (1994)

Music video
- "I Was Born on Christmas Day" on YouTube

"Xmas 93" is a Christmas-themed single by English alternative dance band Saint Etienne. It was released in the United Kingdom on 6 December 1993 by Heavenly Recordings. The lead track "I Was Born on Christmas Day" features guest vocals from The Charlatans singer Tim Burgess, and peaked at number 37 on the UK Singles Chart. The song's title is a nod to band member Bob Stanley, who was born on 25 December 1964. The music video for the single was filmed in the vicinity of Kensington and Chelsea Register Office in London.

The main B-side, "My Christmas Prayer", is a cover of the 1959 Billy Fury original. The other two B-sides, "Snowplough" and "Peterloo", are both instrumentals. The B-sides "Snowplough" and "Peterloo" can be found in the So Tough reissue bonus disc, while "My Christmas Prayer" and "I Was Born on Christmas Day" on the Tiger Bay reissue bonus disc.

== Critical reception ==
Tim Sendra from AllMusic described "I Was Born on Christmas Day" as a duet between Sarah Cracknell and Tim Burgess "set to a house beat." He added, "The melody is very sweet and the vocals blend together nicely, Burgess displaying a healthy (and unusual) dose of restraint." In his weekly UK chart commentary, James Masterton stated, "It wouldn't be Christmas without at least one seasonal record in the charts. Saint Etienne have spent the entire year missing out on the success they so richly deserve." Everett True from Melody Maker named it Single of the Week.

Martin Aston from Music Week gave it four out of five and named it Pick of the Week in the category of Alternative, calling it a "seasonally-challenged" duet and "a catchy, if lightweight, slice of pop, with daytime radio appeal and press potential galore." Danny Frost from NME said "this is a bit of a swizz", noting "a breathier than ever" Burgess. Another NME editor, Jim Wirth, noted the "join-the-dots ABBA-isms" of the song. Leesa Daniels from Smash Hits wrote, "This starts off like a disco classic in the making. But then the weedy girl vocals of Sarah Cracknell come in followed by the weedy boy vocals of Tim Burgess from the Charlatans. And the whole disco classic is out the window." She concluded, "It's dead catchy and instantly singable".

== Music video ==
A music video was produced to promote the song. It was later made available on YouTube in May 2012. In 2020, Sarah Cracknell talked about making the video, saying "We had such a laugh making the video for ‘I Was Born On Christmas Day’ and Tim was a real star. We shot the whole thing in sequence on a Sunday which ended up in a massive party. I'm sure I accidentally broke the hearts of many Charlatans fans who thought the wedding was real." The video featured actor Richard O'Sullivan, of Man About The House fame, playing the father of the bride.

== Track listings ==
All tracks produced by Saint Etienne.

CD single and 12" single
No.	Title	Writer(s)	Length
1.	"I Was Born on Christmas Day" (featuring Tim Burgess)	Ian Catt; Bob Stanley; Pete Wiggs	3:14
2.	"My Christmas Prayer"	Billy Fury	3:28
3.	"Snowplough"	Stanley; Wiggs	3:43
4.	"Peterloo"	Stanley; Wiggs	4:27
Total length:			14:52

7" single and cassette single
No.	Title	Writer(s)	Length
1.	"I Was Born on Christmas Day" (featuring Tim Burgess)	Catt; Stanley; Wiggs	3:14
2.	"My Christmas Prayer"	Fury	3:28
Total length:			6:42

== Charts ==
Chart (1993–94)	Peak position
Europe (Eurochart Hot 100)	93
Israel (Israeli Singles Chart)	18
UK Singles (OCC)	37
UK Airplay (Music Week)	27
UK Indie (Music Week)	1
