= Hobart Paving =

1993 single by Saint Etienne

Single by Saint Etienne

from the album So Tough
- A-side: "Who Do You Think You Are"
- B-side: "Your Head My Voice (Voix Revirement)"
- Released: 11 May 1993
- Recorded: 1993
- Genre: Indie pop
- Length: 4:55
- Label: Heavenly – HVN 29; Warner – 9 40910
- Songwriter(s): Stanley/Wiggs

Saint Etienne singles chronology
"You're in a Bad Way" (1993)	"Hobart Paving" / "Who Do You Think You Are" (1993)	"Xmas 93" (1993)

Music video
- "Hobart Paving" on YouTube

"Hobart Paving" is a song by British pop group Saint Etienne from their second album, So Tough (1993). It was released by Heavenly Records on 11 May 1993 as a double A-side with the band's cover of "Who Do You Think You Are", originally released in 1974 by Jigsaw and a hit for Candlewick Green. It reached number 23 on the UK Singles Chart and number ten on the UK Dance Singles Chart by Music Week.

== Lyrics ==
The song describes an unhappy woman, using characteristically surreal images such as "Rain falls like Elvis tears" and "Just like a harpsichordist she moves". The apparently meaningless title appears in the song's chorus: "Hobart paving, don't you think that's it's time, / On this platform with the drizzle in my eyes?" The title may derive from a construction firm called Hobart Paving Company Limited in the town of Croydon, where two of the band members grew up.

== Critical reception ==
Stephen Thomas Erlewine from AllMusic named "Hobart Paving" a "stand out" from the So Tough album. In his weekly UK chart commentary, James Masterton viewed it as "being a fairly average track". Dave Simpson from Melody Maker praised it as "an absolute gem", remarking its "magnificently eerie melody and Sarah's almost unbearably poignant vocal." Ted Kessler from NME viewed it as "wishy-washy piffle (where's the SONG??)". Armond White from Rolling Stone noted that 'Hobart', one of Saint Etienne's "cast of characters", "inhabit a lovelorn ballad". Roy Wilkinson from Select felt the single "emphasise the way they can be soothingly pastoral and quietly urban in the same song". Another Select editor, Andrew Harrison, wrote that it "recasts Sarah as a divorcee Julie Christie with the beautifully gauche lines 'Rain falls/Just like Elvis did'". Jonathan Bernstein from Spin named it a "time-capsule classic".

== Music video ==
A black-and-white music video was produced to promote the single. It was later made available on YouTube in May 2012.

== Mixes ==
"Hobart Paving" was slightly remixed for single release, adding subtle overdubs and extra instrumentation.

"Your Head My Voice (Voix Revirement)" is a remix of "Who Do You Think You Are", though the source material is unrecognisable in the mix, hence the different title. However, if one reverses the audio, the lyrics "Every day sees another scar, tell me who do you..." are audible. Also of note is the writing credits for "Your Head My Voice (Voix Revirement)" which list Stanley/Wiggs/James as composers, none of whom composed "Who Do You Think You Are" and marking the only time Richard David James/Aphex Twin would be listed as a co-writer of a Saint Etienne track.

An alternative mix of "Hobart Paving", created for the single but ultimately not used, was eventually released on the Nice Price outtakes collection in 2006.

== Track listing ==
All tracks written and composed by Dyer and Scott, except where indicated.

=== European release ===
- 7" – Heavenly / HVN 29 (UK) (also available on MC (HVN 29C))
1. "Hobart Paving" (Stanley, Wiggs) – 4:54
2. "Who Do You Think You Are" – 3:53
- 12" – Heavenly / HVN 29-12 (UK)
1. "Hobart Paving" (Stanley, Wiggs) – 4:54
2. "Your Head My Voice (Voix Revirement)" (Stanley, Wiggs, James) – 4:12
3. "Who Do You Think You Are" – 3:53
4. "Who Do You Think You Are" (Quex-Rd) – 8:08
- 12" – Heavenly / HVN 29-12P (UK) (UK promo. Labelled "Aphex Twin Remixes")
1. "Who Do You Think You Are" (Quex-Rd) – 8:08
2. "Your Head My Voice" (Voix Revirement) (Stanley, Wiggs, James) – 4:12
- CD – Heavenly / HVN 29CD (UK)
1. "Hobart Paving" (Stanley, Wiggs) – 4:54
2. "Who Do You Think You Are" – 3:53
3. "Who Do You Think You Are" (Quex-Rd) – 8:08
4. "Your Head My Voice (Voix Revirement)" (Stanley, Wiggs, James) – 4:12

=== US release ===
- 12" – Warner / 0-40910 (US)
1. "Who Do You Think You Are" (Strobelights & Platform Shoes Mix) – 7:00
2. "Who Do You Think You Are" (Saturday Night Fever Dub) – 6:59
3. "Who Do You Think You Are" (Tilt Dub) – 6:00
4. "Who Do You Think You Are" (Quex-Rd) – 8:08
5. "Who Do You Think You Are" (Nu Solution Mix) – 7:46
6. "Hobart Paving" (UK single version) (Stanley, Wiggs) – 4:54
- 2x12" – Warner / PRO-A-6254 (US) (US 2x12" promo)
1. "Who Do You Think You Are" (Strobelights & Platform Shoes Mix) – 7:00
2. "Who Do You Think You Are" (Saturday Night Fever Dub) – 6:59
3. "Who Do You Think You Are" (Nu Solution Mix) – 7:46
4. "Who Do You Think You Are" (Tilt Dub) – 6:00
1. "Who Do You Think You Are" (Quex-Rd) – 8:08
2. "Your Head My Voice (Voix Revirement)" (Stanley, Wiggs, James) – 4:12
3. "Who Do You Think You Are" (Radio Remix) – 4:39
4. "Who Do You Think You Are" (Bonus Beats Down) – 4:55
- CD – Warner / 9 40910-2 (US)
1. "Who Do You Think You Are" (Album Version) – 3:52
2. "Who Do You Think You Are" (Strobelights & Platform Shoes Mix) – 7:00
3. "Who Do You Think You Are" (Quex-Rd) – 8:08
4. "Hobart Paving" (UK single version) (Stanley, Wiggs) – 4:54
5. "Who Do You Think You Are" (Nu Solution Mix) – 7:46
6. "Who Do You Think You Are" (Saturday Night Fever Dub) – 6:59
7. "Your Head My Voice (Voix Revirement)" (Stanley, Wiggs, James) – 4:12
8. "Who Do You Think You Are" (Radio Remix) (Stanley, Wiggs) – 4:39

=== Remixers ===
==== Aphex Twin ====
1. "Who Do You Think You Are" (Quex-Rd) – 8:08
2. "Your Head My Voice" (Voix Revirement) – 4:12

==== Roger Sanchez ====
1. "Who Do You Think You Are" (Strobelights & Platform Shoes Mix) – 7:00
2. "Who Do You Think You Are" (Nu Solution Mix) – 7:46
3. "Who Do You Think You Are" (Saturday Night Fever Dub) – 6:59
4. "Who Do You Think You Are" (Radio Remix) – 4:39
5. "Who Do You Think You Are" (Tilt Dub) – 6:00
6. "Who Do You Think You Are" (Bonus Beats Down) – 4:55

== Charts ==
Chart (1993)	Peak position
Europe (Eurochart Hot 100) with "Who Do You Think You Are"	74
UK Singles (OCC)	23
UK Dance (Music Week)	10
UK Indie (Music Week)	1

== Cover versions ==
The 1997 German movie Bandits featured a cover version of the song called "Catch Me" (possibly to better match the movie's prison break story), released under the band name "Bandits". The "Hobart Paving" in the chorus was replaced by "Hold on, princess". "Catch Me" peaked at #42 on the German Media Control Singles chart
