= Travis Elborough =

British writer

Travis Elborough (born 1971, Shoreham-by-Sea, Sussex, England) is the British author of The Bus We Loved: London's Affair With the Routemaster (Granta Books, 2005); The Long-Player Goodbye: The Album From vinyl To iPod And Back Again (Sceptre 2008); and Wish You Were Here - England on Sea (Sceptre 2010) and A Walk in the Park (Jonathan Cape, 2016).

He reviews for The Guardian, and has contributed to New Statesman, The Sunday Times, Zembla and The Oldie.
