= Pale Movie =

1994 single by Saint Etienne

Single by Saint Etienne

from the album Tiger Bay
- B-side: "Highgate Road Incident"
- Released: 7 February 1994
- Genre: Folk; Eurodance
- Length: 3:51
- Label: Heavenly
- Songwriters: Bob Stanley; Pete Wiggs
- Producer: Saint Etienne

Saint Etienne singles chronology
| "Xmas 93" (1993) | "Pale Movie" (1994) | "Like a Motorway" (1994) |

Music video
- "Pale Movie" on YouTube

"Pale Movie" is a song by British pop group Saint Etienne, released in February 1994, by Heavenly Records, as the first single from the group's third album, Tiger Bay (1994). The song reached number 28 on the UK Singles Charts and also became a hit in Iceland, peaking at number 24. In common with the folk music theme of the album, the song combines a Eurodance beat with Spanish folk-style guitars. The lyrics use surreal imagery to describe a man's love for a mysterious woman. Although the title is not sung, some of the words refer to cinema: "In the bed where they make love / She's in a film on the sheets. / He shows dreams like a movie, / She's the softness of cinema seats." Other lines are stranger: "her skin as white as the milk, / Just like a Sherpa Tenzing / under a Manila silk."

In an interview with Melody Maker magazine, keyboard player Pete Wiggs said that he considers the song "potentially brilliant" but "a bit of a failure"; he feels that the band "stuck too rigidly to our folk idea". He also adds that they only chose Spanish guitar so that they could go to Spain for the video

The cover art for the single features photographs of swimming tigers, presumably in reference to the album title.

== Critical reception ==
Tim Sendra from AllMusic praised "Pale Movie" as "one of their "strongest, most emotional songs", feeling that "the melancholy fairly oozes from the aching strings, the very sad chords, and Sarah Cracknell's unusually emotional vocals." In his weekly UK chart commentary, James Masterton wrote, "Something really has gone wrong when a band like Saint Etienne make a string of such beautiful records and yet have still to have a really big hit." He concluded, "I will happily dance naked around campus if this is a massive hit". Caitlin Moran from Melody Maker stated, "And finally Saint Etienne turn into The Pet Shop Boys. Bunting, please. This is so sleek you could enter it in the Grand National, so cool you could store perfume in it, and so perfectly crafted carpenters will be weeping into their glueless dovetails for weeks. It bleeps and bloops, and then castanets and Spanish guitars are left to snap and glissande over the top of it. Marvellous."

Pan-European magazine Music & Media commented, "Continentals should forget about their "too British" prejudice. With a bit of patience the same flower can flourish out of this synth pop band as happened last year to the Beloved." Brad Beatnik from Music Week's RM Dance Update deemed it "a typically light, if a little moodier, tune". Another RM editor, James Hamilton, described it as a "Kraftwerk-ishly pulsed lengthily pausing 134.3bpm ethereal swirler" in his weekly dance column. Stephen Dalton from NME named it Sherbed-Coated Single of the Week, writing that "it sounds less like the Hector's House theme at an under-fives rave — the standard Saints formula — than a sleek modern update of Abba's 'Fernando', all Spanish guitar flurries and ill-fated lovers mooching around exotic locations." Rob Sheffield from Rolling Stone declared it a "perfect" UK hit. Tony Cross from Smash Hits gave it a top score of five out of five, adding, "Ai Carumba! Go la-la with the Saints as their latest dip into the pop palette comes up with a Spanish sunset yellow that rattles your castanets and perks up your paella with a saucy salsa beat. Lose the winter blues and join them on the Costa Del Pop for an early vacation — NOW!"

== Music video ==
The accompanying music video for "Pale Movie" was shot in Spain and features the band riding around the countryside of Nerja on scooters.

== Track listings ==
All tracks were written and composed by Bob Stanley and Pete Wiggs.

- 7-inch and cassette, Heavenly / HVN 37, HVN 37 C (UK)
1. "Pale Movie" – 3:51
2. "Highgate Road Incident" – 2:06
- 12-inch and CD, Heavenly / HVN 37 12, HVN 37 CD (UK)
1. "Pale Movie" – 3:51
2. "Pale Movie" (stentorian dub) – 6:46
3. "Pale Movie" (secret knowledge trouser assassin mix) – 10:16
4. "Pale Movie" (lemonentry mix) – 4:05

== Charts ==
| Chart (1994) | Peak position |
|---|---|
| Europe (Eurochart Hot 100) | 83 |
| Iceland (Íslenski Listinn Topp 40) | 24 |
| Israel (Israeli Singles Chart) | 5 |
| UK Singles (Official Charts) | 28 |
| UK Airplay (Music Week) | 28 |
| UK Dance (Music Week) | 20 |
| UK Club Chart (Music Week) | 47 |
