= Stay+ =

Stay+ (Positive)
- Origin: Manchester, England
- Genres: Electronic, experimental
- Years active: 2011–2015
- Labels: Black Butter Records, RAMP Recordings, Double Denim Records, Nest HQ
- Members: Matt Farthing
- Past members: Moses Gold, DEERHEAD, Queenie

Stay+, also known as Stay Positive or Stay Plus (and formerly known as Christian AIDS) is an electronic music act originating from Manchester, England. Originally loosely termed a "collective", the act was later known to be the solo project of London-born music producer, Matt Farthing. Not much else is known about the reclusive Stay+, which chose to release only limited press shots, interviews and details about members/collaborators. One example saw a balloon artist take their place for a Radio 1 interview, another saw an interview answered entirely with YouTube found footage. Following a series of releases on the RAMP label (Flying Lotus, Falty DL), garnering critical acclaim from the likes of Pitchfork, "Crashed" was released on Black Butter Records in November 2012 and proved a commercial step up for the project; receiving heavy mainstream radio play from champions like Radio 1's Annie Mac who made it her Record of the Week.

After 2013 the act disappeared entirely; Farthing moved on apparently and began a new project, FAIK, in 2015.

== Discography ==
- "Stay+" (2011) 7" single (as Christian AIDS)
- "Fever" (2011) 12" single and digital
- "Dandelion" (2011) 10" single and digital
- Fuck Christian AIDS (2012) digital EP
- "Guardian" (2012) digital single
- Arem (2012) 12" vinyl, digital
- "Crashed" (feat. Queenie) (2012) digital single
- "Shill / Cerebral Bore" (2013) digital single

== Name controversy ==
Under the previous guise of "Christian AIDS", the act was forced to change its name after a cease and desist letter from the Christian Aid charity. "Stay Positive" was the name of their first release.
