= Hug My Soul =

1994 single by Saint Etienne

Single by Saint Etienne

from the album Tiger Bay
- B-side: "Hate Your Drug"; "I Buy American Records"; "La Poupee Qui Fait Non (No No No)"
- Released: 19 September 1994
- Genre: Ambient dub
- Length: 4:14
- Label: Heavenly; Warner Bros.
- Songwriters: Batson; Male; Cracknell
- Producer: Saint Etienne

Saint Etienne singles chronology
"Like a Motorway" (1994)	"Hug My Soul" (1994)	"He's on the Phone" (1995)

Music video
- "Hug My Soul" on YouTube

Alternative cover
- US cover

"Hug My Soul" is a song by British band Saint Etienne. It was the third single from their third album, Tiger Bay (1994), and was released in September 1994 by Heavenly Records and Warner Bros. Records. It was written by vocalist Sarah Cracknell along with songwriting partners Guy Batson and Johnny Male (Male and Batson would help co-write a number of tracks on Cracknell's solo debut Lipslide).

The single was released with three B-sides: two written by Saint Etienne's songwriting partnership of Bob Stanley and Pete Wiggs, "I Buy American Records" and "Hate Your Drug", and a cover version of La Poupée Qui Fait Non (No, No, No)", a live recording produced by the band's friend (and future Heavenly label mate) Edwyn Collins. A second CD featured remixes by Motiv8, Secret Knowledge, Juan "Kinky" Hernandez and Sure Is Pure. It reached number 32 on the UK Singles Chart and was their first single not to be released on 7-inch vinyl. The music video for the song was directed by Steven Wells.

This would be Saint Etienne's final release for Warner Bros. Follow up single "He's on the Phone" would be released on MCA Records, lifted from a dance compilation album called Life is a Dance. The US releases included a number of exclusive remixes - including an alternate album version (which was released as a bonus track on the US version of Tiger Bay), a Motiv-8 dub, and the On Tour In '94 dub.

The song bears a resemblance to the 70s disco hit More, More, More by Andrea True Connection. In particular, the phrasing of the "More More More" lyric "Ooh, how do you like your love?" is identical to the "Hug My Soul" lyric "Ooh, what are you dreaming of?", and both lyrics are the opening to each of their representative songs.

== Marketing ==
The UK release featured cover art involving a photograph of abandoned musical instruments. The US release features a photograph of the band.

== Critical reception ==
Professional ratings
Review scores
Source	Rating
Smash Hits	4/5 stars

Tim Sendra from AllMusic complimented the song as "lush and sophisticated dance-pop". Larry Flick from Billboard magazine wrote, "Songs like 'Hug My Soul' combine a familiar blend of airy modern pop with prominent dance beats and fairly aggressive execution." In his weekly UK chart commentary, James Masterton said that Sarah Cracknell and the lads "return with what is probably not the most straightforward single they have ever released, moving away from the pretty pop tunes they have produced of late and going back to their ambient dub roots and the sort of sound that dominates their albums. No major surprises then and no large hits - for now." Ian Gittins from Melody Maker named it Single of the Week and a "ravishing, saccharine-and-switchblade lament". He praised Cracknell's "come-on tones ooze like honey over a twee-yet-tenuous plastic pop beat". Simon Price from the same publication declared it as "an impertinent rewrite" of 'More, More, More' that "swoons in the right places".

Pan-European magazine Music & Media wrote, "Despite the six mixes to draw the attention of the dance-minded, it will always be a pop song. If you don't think you're ready, check out the lovely track 'I Buy American Records'." James Hamilton from Music Week's RM Dance Update named it a "strings sawed breathy sweet shuffler" in his weekly dance column. David Quantick from NME felt it's "a proper tune". Another NME editor, Paul Moody, said the song, "which, for all its Sub Sub disco nuances and '70s soul flute fills, is little but a shuffle through Andrea True Connection's 'More, More, More'." Neil Spencer from The Observer called it a "chart contender" and "disco slick". Tony Cross from Smash Hits praised it as a "piece of pop perfection", while female pop-punk music duo Shampoo reviewed it for the magazine, giving it four out of five.

== Music video ==
The single was marketed with a surreal music video inspired by the 1975 French film La Bête. It was directed by British journalist, author, comedian and punk poet Steven Wells. The video involved what was, according to Wells, a “frighteningly realistic bear suit”. Werner Herzog later ripped this idea off for Grizzly Man. In the video, Sarah Cracknell plays a young girl asleep with her stuffed toys; she dreams of being chased by a bear, but ultimately ends up having jelly and ice cream with him in his den, attired in a sultry black dress that had featured in the 1971 James Bond film Diamonds are Forever, on which her father Derek Cracknell had served as a second unit director. "We had a meeting to discuss locations and so on, and it was decided that I'd wear a dress of my mum's that had been worn by Jill St. John in Diamonds Are Forever," Cracknell recounted, "but that's another story." "Hug My Soul" was later made available on YouTube in 2012.

== Track listing ==
All tracks were written and composed by Batson, Cracknell, Male; except where indicated.

Cassette, Heavenly / HVN42 CS
No.	Title	Writer(s)	Length
1.	"Hug My Soul"		3:56
2.	"Hate Your Drug"	Stanley, Wiggs	3:47

12-inch, Heavenly / HVN42 12
No.	Title	Length
1.	"Hug My Soul (Album version)"	3:56
2.	"Hug My Soul (Sure Is Pure's Kodacolour House Mix)"	8:42
3.	"Hug My Soul (Motiv8's Blackpool Mix)"	6:45
4.	"Hug My Soul (Secret Knowledge's Limbo Mix)"	10:06

12-inch, Heavenly / HVN42 12P
No.	Title	Length
1.	"Hug My Soul (Motiv 8 Mix - Blackpool Mix)"	6:45
2.	"Hug My Soul (12-inch Mix)"	6:29
3.	"Hug My Soul (Sure Is Pure's Kodacolour House Mix)"	8:42
4.	"Hug My Soul (Sure Is Pure - Little Deuce Dub)"	8:40

12-inch, Warner Bros. / 9 41591-0
No.	Title	Length
1.	"Hug My Soul (Kodacolor House Mix)"	8:42
2.	"Hug My Soul (Little Deuce Dub)"	8:40
3.	"Hug My Soul (Nu Bootz Groove)"	4:49
4.	"Hug My Soul (Motive-8 Mix"	6:45
5.	"Hug My Soul (Motive-8 Dub)"	6:41
6.	"Hug My Soul (Secret Knowledge Limbo Mix)"	10:06

- Tracks 1,2 remixed by Sure Is Pure
- Tracks 3,4 remixed by Kris Needs

CD, Heavenly / HVN42CD
No.	Title	Writer(s)	Length
1.	"Hug My Soul"		3:56
2.	"I Buy American Records"	Stanley, Wiggs	2:50
3.	"Hate Your Drug"	Stanley, Wiggs	3:47
4.	"La Poupee Qui Fait Non (No No No) - Live In Reykyavik"	Polnareff, Stephens	3:55

CD, Heavenly / HVN42CDR
No.	Title	Length
1.	"Hug My Soul (12-inch Mix)" (remixed by Mark "Spike" Stent)	6:29
2.	"Hug My Soul (Motiv 8 - Blackpool Mix)"	6:45
3.	"Hug My Soul (Sure Is Pure - Kodacolour House Mix)"	8:45
4.	"Hug My Soul (Juan 'Kinky' Hernandez - Nu Bootz Groove)"	4:51
5.	"Hug My Soul (Secret Knowledge - Limbo Mix)"	10:06

CD, Warner Bros. / 9 41591-2
No.	Title	Length
1.	"Hug My Soul (Alternate Album Version)"	4:23
2.	"Hug My Soul (Kodacolor House Mix)"	8:45
3.	"No, No, No, No, No (La Poupee Qui Fait Non)"	3:55
4.	"Hug My Soul (Nu Bootz Groove)"	4:51
5.	"Hug My Soul (Motiv-8 Mix)"	6:45
6.	"I Buy American Records"	2:55
7.	"Hug My Soul (Secret Knowledge Limbo Mix)"	10:06

== Charts ==
Chart (1994)	Peak position
Europe (Eurochart Hot 100)	100
Scotland (OCC)	34
UK Singles (OCC)	32
UK Dance (OCC)	35
UK Airplay (Music Week)	38
UK Club Chart (Music Week)	54
US Maxi-Singles Sales (Billboard)	40
