= Saint Etienne (band) =

English alternative dance band

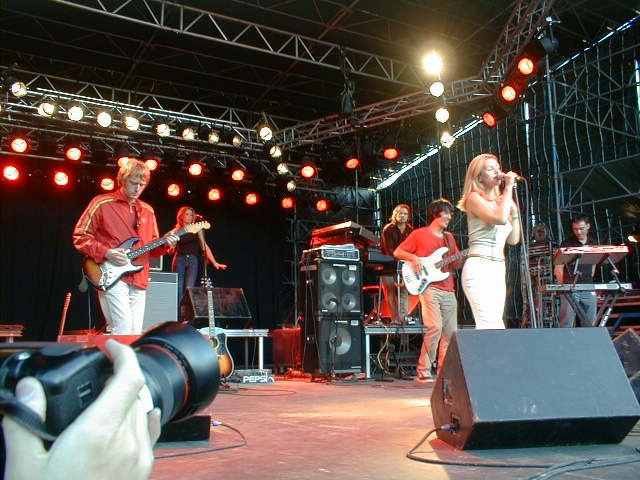
- Saint Etienne performing at Fanclub festival in Sweden, 1998

Background information
- Origin: Croydon, Greater London, England
- Genres: Alternative dance; indie pop; synthpop; dance-pop
- Years active: 1990–present
- Labels: Heavenly; Warner Bros.; Creation; Sub Pop; Mantra; Sanctuary
- Members: Sarah Cracknell; Bob Stanley; Pete Wiggs
- Website: saintetienne.com

Saint Etienne (/seɪn ɛtiˈɛn/) are an English band from Greater London, formed in 1990. The band consists of Sarah Cracknell, Bob Stanley and Pete Wiggs. Initially emerging from the indie dance scene of the 1990s, their music has blended club culture with 1960s pop and other disparate influences.

Their debut album, Foxbase Alpha, was released to critical acclaim in 1991, featuring their most enduring hits "Only Love Can Break Your Heart" and "Nothing Can Stop Us". It was followed by So Tough (1993), with the number twelve single "You're in a Bad Way", and the techno folk experiment of Tiger Bay (1994); both albums reached the top-ten. Their early period was rounded out by the gold-certified compilation Too Young to Die: Singles 1990–1995, producing the band's highest-charting single, "He's on the Phone" with Étienne Daho.

The band recorded Good Humor (1998) at Tambourine Studios in Sweden on entirely analogue equipment, and the album's lead single "Sylvie" reached number twelve in the UK charts. With Sound of Water (2000), recorded in Berlin with To Rococo Rot, the group pivoted towards ambient music, while Finisterre (2002) and Tales from Turnpike House (2005) distilled these stylistic diversions and saw a return to their early influences and subject matter, referencing London, British cinema and popular culture. Words and Music by Saint Etienne (2012) saw them work with former Xenomania's Tim Powell and Nick Coler as well as Rob Davis, while Home Counties (2017) was co-produced by Shawn Lee. The group used vaporwave-inspired samples on I've Been Trying to Tell You (2021), which became their highest-charting album since 1994 at number fourteen. The Night (2024) took their sound further into beatless atmospherics. International was released on 5 September 2025. The band has said it is their final studio album.

The band's name comes from the French football club AS Saint-Étienne.

== History ==
=== Background ===
Bob Stanley and Pete Wiggs were childhood friends and former music journalists, who once had a fanzine called Caff which had developed into a record label by 1989. They originally planned that Saint Etienne would use a variety of different lead singers, and their 1991 debut album, Foxbase Alpha – influenced by sources such as club culture, 1960s pop, and Orchestral Manoeuvres in the Dark's Dazzle Ships – features several vocalists, including Moira Lambert and Donna Savage. However, after working with Sarah Cracknell on "Nothing Can Stop Us", they decided to make her the permanent vocalist, and Cracknell has written or co-written many of the band's songs.

=== 1990s ===
Saint Etienne were associated with the "indie dance" genre in the early 1990s. Their typical approach was to combine sonic elements (such as samples and digitally synthesized sounds) of the dance-pop that emerged in the wake of the so-called Second Summer of Love with an emphasis on songwriting involving romantic and introspective themes more commonly associated with traditional British pop and rock music. Early work demonstrated the influence of 1960s soul, 1970s dub and rock as well as 1980s dance music, giving them a broad palette of sounds and a reputation for eclecticism. Years later, The Times wrote that they "deftly fused the grooviness of Swinging Sixties London with a post-acid house backbeat". Their first two albums, Foxbase Alpha and So Tough, feature sounds chiefly associated with house music, such as standard TR-909 drum patterns and Italo house piano riffs mixed with original sounds, notable by the use of found dialogue, sampled from 1960s British realist cinema.

In 1991, the band also released two singles, "7 Ways to Love" and "He Is Cola", under the name Cola Boy with different singers (one of them being future radio personality Janey Lee Grace, who recorded and appeared in the video for the former); their explanation for publishing under a pen name is that the tracks were "too cheesy for Saint Etienne. We'd have been finished overnight". The band would later produce an updated electro-house version of "7 Ways to Love" for Japanese singer Nokko for her 1993 album I Will Catch U (also known as Call Me Nightlife for the United States, Canada and Europe), in which she added lyrics to the song in both Japanese and English.

During the early 1990s the group enjoyed extensive coverage in UK music weekly papers NME and Melody Maker and gained a reputation as purveyors of "pure pop" in the period immediately prior to the Brit-Pop explosion. So Tough reached No. 7 on the UK Albums Chart. Their most popular singles of this period were "You're in a Bad Way" and "Join Our Club" (which reached No. 12 and No. 21 on the UK Singles Chart).

Tiger Bay (1994) represented a change of direction: the entire album was inspired by folk music, combined with modern electronica. Although the album reached No. 8 on the UK Albums Chart, the singles performed disappointingly, with "Pale Movie", "Like a Motorway" and "Hug My Soul" reaching No. 28, No. 47 and No. 32 on the UK Singles Chart. In a 2009 interview, Bob Stanley said that in retrospect the band "got ahead of ourselves a bit" by releasing such an uncommercial album, which "definitely could have done with a couple more obvious songs".

In 1995, they released their most successful single, "He's on the Phone", a reworking of Étienne Daho's "Week-end à Rome" that they had created for a collaborative EP with Daho entitled Reserection. It reached No. 11 on the UK chart.

Stanley has said that with hindsight it was "a bit stupid" that the band "didn't release another single for two and a half years". Instead, they released a compilation album, Too Young to Die (1996), contributed a song to the Gary Numan tribute album Random the following year, and then returned in 1998 with Good Humor, which de-emphasized the contemporary dance music influence on their previous work, replacing it with a more traditional sound. Also in 1998 they covered "La, la, la" on A Song for Eurotrash, a compilation of re-imagined past hits from the Eurovision Song Contest. (The song can be found on Fairfax High.)

=== 2000s ===
In 2000, they shifted toward a more atmospheric type of electronica with the release of Sound of Water.

Finisterre was released in 2002. A follow-up DVD by photographer and film maker Paul Kelly was released on 4 July 2005. In November 2004, they released their first US compilation of greatest hits, called Travel Edition 1990-2005. 13 June 2005 saw the release of the band's album Tales from Turnpike House. It was preceded by a single for the track "Side Streets". A second single, "A Good Thing", was released in the United Kingdom on 31 October 2005. Early editions of the album were accompanied by a six-track sampler CD for a planned album of children's songs titled Up the Wooden Hills.

After years floating around various record labels, the band returned to its original label Heavenly for their 2009 career retrospective, London Conversations: The Best of Saint Etienne. The album contained two singles, a reworked "Burnt Out Car" and a new track, the Richard X-produced "Method of Modern Love". The album also contained as a third "new" track, a remix by Richard X of the previously vinyl-only "This Is Tomorrow".

=== 2010s ===
In May 2012, following the January release of the single "Tonight", the band released their eighth studio album, Words and Music by Saint Etienne. A companion album of additional songs More Words and Music by Saint Etienne accompanied the album's US release.

Paul Kelly's film How We Used to Live was released in 2014, co-written by Bob Stanley and Travis Elborough. The soundtrack was composed by Pete Wiggs, and featured performances from both Sarah Cracknell and Debsey Wykes. To promote the film, Saint Etienne undertook a short tour, providing a live soundtrack to screenings of the film.

Saint Etienne's ninth studio album, Home Counties, was released on 2 June 2017.

=== 2020s and split ===
Their tenth album, I've Been Trying to Tell You, was released on 10 September 2021. According to Pete Wiggs, the album was a lockdown project for the trio during the COVID-19 pandemic, prior to which they were working on a different set of tracks. In September 2021, he confirmed the group planned to revisit the material for a possible 2022 release. Their eleventh album, The Night, was released on 13 December 2024.

Whilst promoting The Night, the group confirmed that a further album would soon follow, and in May 2025, International was announced for release in September, with "Glad" as the first single. The press release and subsequent interviews for the album also revealed that this would be the final Saint Etienne album following Bob Stanley's suggestion to Cracknell and Wiggs that they conclude their recording career on a positive note.

=== 2027 ===
Scheduled to perform at the Glastonbury Festival of Contemporary Performing Arts, which takes place from 23 to 27 June 2027.

=== Collaborations ===
1993's non-album single "Who Do You Think You Are" is a cover of a song originally written by members of the band Jigsaw in either late 1973 or early '74 and originally was a single for Candlewick Green though Jigsaw also recorded it. It was also done by Bo Donaldson and The Heywoods later in 1974. Saint Etienne recorded it as a duet with Debsey Wykes, former singer of Dolly Mixture. The song was also remixed by Aphex Twin.

In 1993, the band collaborated with Kylie Minogue for two songs: a cover of "Nothing Can Stop Us" (intended at the time to be her first single release for her new label) and "When Are You Coming Home" (unreleased).

The band also wrote and produced the 1993 single "One Goodbye in Ten" for Shara Nelson. The same year, the Xmas 93 EP featured Tim Burgess from The Charlatans on the lead track "I Was Born on Christmas Day".

In 1995, the band co-recorded the Reserection EP with French pop singer Étienne Daho; later, they also worked on his album Eden and single "Le Premier Jour".

For the band's first greatest hits compilation, Too Young to Die – The Singles (1995), Eurodance producer Steve Rodway reworked the track "Accident" from the Reserection EP, producing the renamed single "He's on the Phone." The single, co-credited to Daho, gained the singer additional exposure to English-speaking audiences.

In 2000, the band crossed genres by working with trance producer and DJ Paul van Dyk, resulting in the single "Tell Me Why (The Riddle)", with vocals by Cracknell.

The 2005 album Tales from Turnpike House features David Essex as a guest vocalist. Several tracks on the album were co-written and co-produced by Brian Higgins' songwriting production team, Xenomania.

Sarah Cracknell has collaborated with Marc Almond on his single "I Close My Eyes and Count to Ten" for his album Stardom Road.

In addition to the Richard X collaboration on the "This is Tomorrow"/"Method of Modern Love" single, 2009 also saw the limited release of Foxbase Beta, the producer's reworking of the band's debut album Foxbase Alpha.

Home Counties, released in June 2017, features collaborations with London band Kero Kero Bonito.

=== Film and television work ===
The 1998 album The Misadventures of Saint Etienne is the soundtrack to the independent film The Misadventures of Margaret, starring Parker Posey. After the soundtrack was completed, the film's producers opted to replace it with a more "conventional" soundtrack, but a number of tracks can still be heard in the background of the film's final version, and Saint Etienne received top "original music" credit on the film. The band also recorded a duet by Cracknell and Posey titled "Secret Love" for the soundtrack, but due to legal entanglements it has never been released.

The band recorded the theme song and incidental music for Maryoku Yummy, a 2010 children's television show that aired on Tiny Pop and The Hub.

The band has also been involved directly in film production, notably collaborating with filmmaker Paul Kelly on several short films documenting the landscape and history of London. The first of these was Finisterre (2002), set to songs from the album of the same name, inspired by the 1967 film The London Nobody Knows and Patrick Keiller's 1994 film London. A series of three-minute films entitled "Today's Special" (2004) documented "London's disappearing cafés", while What Have You Done Today, Mervyn Day? (2005) looked at the landscape of the Lower Lea Valley, which was about to be transformed by the 2012 London Olympics. The band then revisited the area in 2012 for a short entitled Seven Summers.

In 2007, the band produced This Is Tomorrow in their capacity as artists-in-residence at the newly refurbished Royal Festival Hall, telling the story of the Hall's first 50 years. This Is Tomorrow premiered on 29 June 2007 as part of the Hall's opening season with the band performing the film soundtrack live. In 2014, Saint Etienne and Kelly collaborated on How We Used To Live, a view of London from 1945 to 1980, making extensive use of archive film.

The band's most recent film is I've Been Trying to Tell You (2021), directed by Alasdair McLellan and set to the music of the album of the same name. Unlike their previous films, it was filmed all around England; its premise was memories of teenage years and the late 1990s.

==== Songs in other films and television ====
"Like a Motorway" appears on the soundtrack of the 1994 film Speed, although the single is never heard in the actual film itself.

Their song "Hobart Paving", with slightly altered lyrics (replacing the title lyric with the line "Hold on princess...") and an altered title ("Catch Me"), was covered for the soundtrack of the 1997 film Bandits, and was an integral part of the soundtrack album (one of two promotional videos released for the soundtrack was for the song), which became the best-selling soundtrack album to a European film soon after release. Actor/musician Jasmin Tabatabai still performs that version in concert.

"We're in the City" from the Places to Visit EP is featured in Jamie Babbit's 1999 film But I'm a Cheerleader. Also in 1999, "Wood Cabin" from the Good Humor album appeared in "I Dream of Jeannie Cusamano", the first season finale of The Sopranos, playing in the background during Jimmy Altieri's assassination.

"A Good Thing", co-written by Cracknell, Mark Waterfield and Lawrence Oakley, is featured in Pedro Almodóvar's 2006 film Volver and in the Grey's Anatomy season 2 episode "Tell Me Sweet Little Lies".

== Awards and nominations ==
Award	Year	Nominee(s)	Category	Result	Ref.
Mercury Prize	1992	Foxbase Alpha	Album of the Year	Nominated	
Popjustice £20 Music Prize	2009	"Method of Modern Love"	Best British Pop Single	Nominated	
Popjustice £20 Music Prize	2012	"Tonight"	Best British Pop Single	Nominated	

== Discography ==
- Foxbase Alpha (1991)
- So Tough (1993)
- Tiger Bay (1994)
- Continental (1997) (Note: Initially marketed as a compilation album, Continental was retroactively designated a canon entry into the group's official album discography following its reissue in 2009.)
- Good Humor (1998)
- Sound of Water (2000)
- Finisterre (2002)
- Tales from Turnpike House (2005)
- Words and Music by Saint Etienne (2012)
- Home Counties (2017)
- I've Been Trying to Tell You (2021)
- The Night (2024)
- International (2025)

== See also ==
- List of number-one dance hits (United States)
- List of artists who reached number one on the US Dance chart
