= Moira Lambert =

British singer

Moira Lambert is a British singer and recording artist. She collaborated with the electronica group Saint Etienne on the Neil Young cover "Only Love Can Break Your Heart" (which went Top 40 in the UK and to No 1 in the US Hot Dance charts).

Lambert began singing, playing acoustic guitar and song-writing as a child living in Africa, largely influenced by the Celtic folk songs her parents taught her. While at school in the UK she became a fan of the British indie scene, enjoying acts like The Smiths and The Cure, later exploring vintage records by artists like Sandy Denny, Neil Young and Joni Mitchell. She is also a fan of avant-garde cinema.

She formed the indie band Faith Over Reason in late 1988 with Bill Lloyd (bass & keyboards), Simon Roots (guitar) and Mark Wilsher (drums). They quickly gained a management deal with Bedlam Management, who secured a publishing deal with Polygram. Their first self-titled EP was released in 1990 on Big Cat Records, and UK tours with Lush, Slowdive and Heather Nova (whose first recording Lambert contributed backing vocals to) followed. In 1994 she toured Europe with label mate Jeff Buckley, after which the band (then featuring Te-bo Steele as replacement for Roots) split.

After co-writing the top 20 UK chart hit, "Skin on Skin", with Paul Oakenfold for his Grace project, Lambert formed Ova, releasing a 3 track single, Universal Audio on UK independent label Global Warming. Since Ova broke up in January 2000, Lambert has collaborated with Freeloader and Data, two obscure electronica collectives staying well in the vein of trip hop, and contributed backing vocals to Tram's album, A Kind of Closure, released on UK's Jet Set Records.

Lambert relocated to Victoria, British Columbia, Canada, in 2002. Lambert studied at the Conservatory of Music, played in coffee bars, and worked with Spanish cellist, pianist and composer Dan Anies, who co-wrote two of the songs on her first solo album 'Coming Up Roses' (released October 2006). Following the release of this album, Lambert wrote and performed the theme music for a Chum Television documentary 'Survival of the Fittest: Stories from the West Coast Trail' with Fox. She released the album 'Climbing Mountains In The Night' in 2008.

Lambert then collaborated on an album of club mixes with composer Luke Parkin, also produced by Fox. Her music is eclectic, ranging from folky to stylized pop.

== Discography ==
- Heather Nova, These Walls (12" EP) Big Cat ABB24T, 1990
- Faith Over Reason, Faith Over Reason (12" EP) Big Cat ABB17T, 1990
- Faith Over Reason, Billy Blue (12" EP) Big Cat SCD023, 1990
- Saint Etienne, Only Love Can Break Your Heart (single) Heavenly HVN12, 1990
- Faith Over Reason, Eyes Wide Smile (LP) Big Cat ABB27X, 1991
- Faith Over Reason, Blind (12" EP) Big Cat ABB58CD, 1994
- Faith Over Reason, Easy (LP) Big Cat ABB63CD, 1994
- Skin on Skin, Perfecto PERF116T, 1996
- Grace (Paul Oakenfold) (single),
- Ova, Universal Audio (single) Global Warming WARMCD1, 1998
- Tram, A Kind of Closure (LP), Jet Set 780045, 2002
- Moira, Coming Up Roses (LP), Blissful BLSS001, 2006
- Moira, Barefoot in the Snow (Limited Edition single) Blissful BLS0002, 2006
- Luke Parkin, Classitronica (EP), 2007
- Corwin Fox & Moira, Survival of the Fittest: Stories from the West Coast Trail soundtrack, Chiaro productions, 2007
- Moira, Climbing Mountains in the Night (EP), Blissful BLS0003, 2008
- Saint Etienne, Only Love Can Break Your Heart on FoxBase Beta 2009
