= Like a Motorway =

Single by Saint Etienne

from the album Tiger Bay
- B-side: "Sushi Rider"; "You Know I'll Miss You When You're Gone"
- Released: 16 May 1994
- Genre: Synth-pop; disco
- Length: 3:38
- Label: Heavenly (HVN 40)
- Songwriter(s): Bob Stanley; Pete Wiggs
- Producer(s): Saint Etienne

Saint Etienne singles chronology
"Pale Movie" (1994)	"Like a Motorway" (1994)	"Hug My Soul" (1994)

Music video
- "Like a Motorway" on YouTube

"Like a Motorway" is a song by British pop group Saint Etienne. It appears on their third album, Tiger Bay (1994) and was released as a single by Heavenly Records in May 1994, reaching number 47 on the UK Singles Chart and number 13 on the Music Week Dance Singles chart. The US release of Tiger Bay also features an "alternate version" with more complex percussion and electric guitar stings. It also appears on the original soundtrack for the 1994 film Speed, although the single is never heard in the actual film itself.

The song combines the melody from the nineteenth century folk song "Silver Dagger" with a driving techno beat influenced by German groups Kraftwerk and Snap!. It describes a friend whose lover has mysteriously vanished. The cover art for the single features an abandoned car overgrown with foliage. The accompanying music video consists of a long, slow zoom in Sarah Cracknell as she sings against a black background, intercut with occasional rapid shots of Pete Wiggs and Bob Stanley in a car.

== Critical reception ==
Dave Thompson from AllMusic described the song as "mysteriously Kraftwerk-ian". Another AllMusic editor, Tim Sendra, named it one of Saint Etienne's best songs. Larry Flick from Billboard magazine felt it has "a nice sing-along chorus", complimenting Sarah Cracknell that "uses her girlish, light voice well, and has grown into a polished front person..." He also noted its "gauzy softness", adding, "DJs will dig the rhythm foundation with its rapid, Giorgio Moroder-esque pattern, though single is also the act's best bet to date for a top 40 breakthrough." Simon Price from Melody Maker praised it as "divine", adding further, "When I hear that heartbreakingly perfect bassline, feel that sublime, liberating, walking-on-air release you only get from disco (and I mean disco, 1979, Sheila & B. Devotion's 'Spacer', DiscoDiscoDiscoDisco), I want to forever renounce nasty alternative noise as a bad idea."

Another Melody Maker editor, Holly Barringer, named "Like a Motorway" Single of the Week, admitting. "I'm a long-standing member of the Saint Etienne non-fanclub. [...] But I just resigned, because this sounds like early Yazoo or Erasure and has blown my contempt right out of the water." Stuart Bailie and Ben Willmott from NME both complimented the track. Bailie declared it as "Marvellous dreamy stuff — a Europop tune that's a near relative of Desireless' 'Voyage Voyage' with a tragic storyline straight off an old Shangri-Las love-'em-and-leave-'em weepie." Willmott stated, "Whether you believe the Etiennes to be perfect pop purveyors or kitsch glam chancers, you can't deny their love of good music from every genre." On the album release, the magazine's Jim Wirth called the track "teutonic". Neil Spencer from The Observer viewed it as a "chart contender" and "disco slick". Roy Wilkinson from Select felt it "emphasise the way they can be soothingly pastoral and quietly urban in the same song".

== Track listing ==
All tracks written and composed by Stanley and Wiggs; except where indicated.

7": Heavenly / HVN 40 and MC: Heavenly / HVN40C
No.	Title	Writer(s)	Length
1.	"Like a Motorway (Radio Edit)"		3:38
2.	"You Know I'll Miss You When You're Gone"	Cracknell, Bund	2:57
3.	"Sushi Rider"	Cracknell, Bund	2:57

12": Heavenly / HVN 40 12 and CD: Heavenly / HVN40CD
No.	Title	Length
1.	"Like a Motorway (Radio Edit)" (mixed by Rick Smith from Underworld)	3:38
2.	"Like a Motorway (Chekhov Warp Dub)" (mixed by Dust Brothers)	9:18
3.	"Like a Motorway (The David Holmes Mix)"	13:01
4.	"Like a Motorway (Skin Up, You're Already Dead)" (mixed by Autechre)	8:47

12": Heavenly / HVN 40 12 P II (UK Promo)
No.	Title	Length
1.	"Like a Motorway (Chekhov Warp Dub)" (mixed by Dust Brothers)	9:18
2.	"Like a Motorway (Chekhov Warp Mix)" (mixed by Dust Brothers)	9:03

CD: Warner Bros. / PRO-A-6962 (US Promo)
No.	Title	Length
1.	"Like a Motorway (Alternate Version)" (mixed by Daniel Abraham)	5:26
2.	"Like a Motorway (Alternate Version Edit)" (mixed by Daniel Abraham)	3:06
3.	"Like a Motorway"	5:43
4.	"Like a Motorway (Radio Edit)"	3:38

== Charts ==
Chart (1994)	Peak position
UK Singles (OCC)	47
UK Dance (Music Week)	13
UK Club Chart (Music Week)	31
