= Ian Catt =

British record producer and instrumentalist

Ian Catt is a British record producer and multi-instrumentalist associated with several popular indie groups, including Saint Etienne, with whom he has been a touring member. He has also collaborated with Saint Etienne's vocalist Sarah Cracknell on her solo album, Lipslide. Catt also produced several albums for Heavenly and is a long-standing collaborator of Bobby Wratten, working with his groups The Field Mice, Northern Picture Library, Trembling Blue Stars and Occasional Keepers. He was also an official member of the latter group for a short time. His solo project, Katmandu, released a single and album on the Vinyl Japan label in 1994.

He was the main producer on Saint Etienne's 2012 release Words and Music. His recent work also includes bands on Shelflife Records, such as Dylan Mondegreen, The School, The Proctors, and When Nalda Became Punk.
