= Pete Wiggs =

English musician

- Born: Peter Stewart Wiggs; 15 May 1966 (age 59)
- Genres: Dance
- Occupation: DJ
- Instrument: Keyboards
- Years active: 1990–present
- Member of: Saint Etienne

Peter Stewart Wiggs (born 15 May 1966) is an English musician and DJ from Reigate, Surrey.

== Saint Etienne ==
Pete Wiggs is a member of the pop/dance group Saint Etienne (alongside Bob Stanley and Sarah Cracknell) for which he co-writes songs, produces and plays keyboards on stage. With the advent of computer based digital recording in the early 2000s, Wiggs set up his home studio Needham Sound (named after Chris Needham from the BBC documentary In Bed With Chris Needham).

== Film and soundtracks ==
Wiggs has assisted in the production of several Saint Etienne film projects filmed and directed by Paul Kelly. Finisterre (2002) used the music from the band's album also titled Finisterre to create "a hymn to the dark corners and empty hallways of a great city that is subtle and artistic" – The Guardian.

For their second collaboration, What Have You Done Today Mervyn Day (2005) – "an extraordinarily resonant urban pastoral" filmed in London's Lower Lea Valley during the early preparations for the 2012 Olympic Games – Wiggs, Stanley and Ian Catt composed an original soundtrack which was performed live to the film at The Barbican (who had commissioned the event).

Wiggs, Stanley, Kelly and producer Andrew Hinton were 'artists in residence' at The Southbank Centre in 2006. The centrepiece of their year's residency was the film This Is Tomorrow (2007) about the history of the Southbank Centre. The film was premiered with a live performance of the score (composed by Wiggs, Stanley and Ian Catt – and conducted by Gerard Johnson) including a sixty piece orchestra at the Royal Festival Hall.

Wiggs and Stanley were commissioned to compose alternative scores for Designed in Britain (1959) and Design for Today (1965) the BFI's COI collection Volume 2 DVD and Blu-ray.

Wiggs, Stanley and Catt have provided the theme music and score for the first season of American Greetings' children's cartoon series Maryoku Yummy.

In 2013, Wiggs composed and performed the score to the Paul Kelly and Saint Etienne film How We Used To Live, which was first shown at the London Film Festival. The same year, Wiggs was commissioned by the British Film Institute to write a new score for 1904 silent ghost story, The Mistletoe Bough, directed by Percy Stow.

In 2014, Wiggs wrote and performed the score to Year 7, which was directed by Rob Leggatt and written by Rafe Spall. The film was shortlisted for the Best UK Short Award at the 2015 London Short Film Festival.

== DJ career ==
Wiggs was born in Reigate, Surrey, and has DJed since the early days of Saint Etienne, with occasional appearances at the Sunday Social and a residency at the Kahuna Burger. Wiggs and Stanley ran their own club "Don't Laugh" in the mid-1990s and hosted "Turntable Cafe" events at the Queen Elizabeth Hall in 2006/2007.

== Radio ==
Wiggs co-hosts a weekly radio show, "The Séance", with James Papademetrie on Brighton's Radio Reverb and Slack City Radio, and together they put on séance DJ events.

== Writing ==
Wiggs co-wrote four issues of fanzine CAFF in the mid-1980s with his childhood friend and fellow band member Bob Stanley and had a regular column ("Pete Wiggs' life and style") in the dance magazine Jockey Slut, from 1997 to 1998.

== Record labels ==
Wiggs was involved in the running of two record labels along with Bob Stanley: Icerink Records (1992–94) and EMIdisc (1996).
