= Bob Stanley (musician) =

British musician (born 1964)

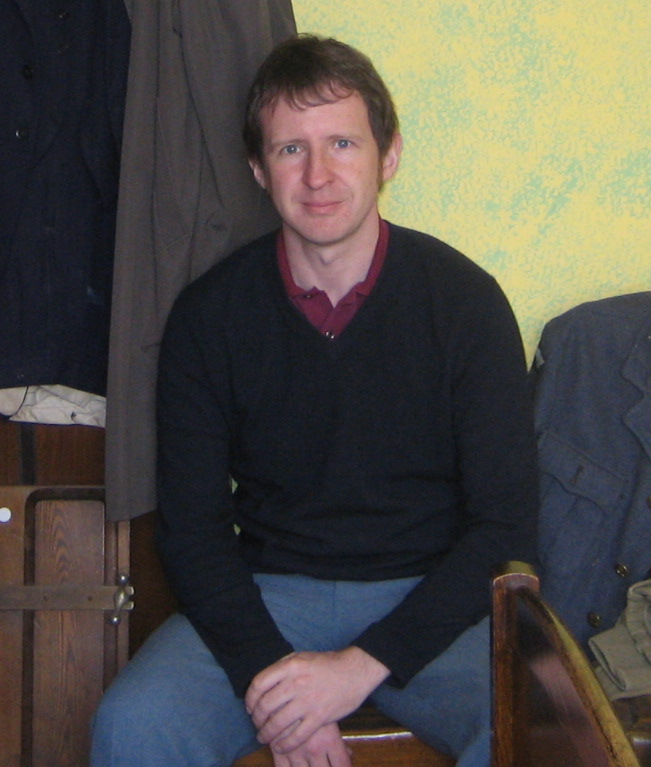
- Stanley in 2009

Background information
- Born: Robert Andrew Shukman; 25 December 1964 (age 61)
- Origin: Horsham, Sussex, England
- Genres: Synthpop; alternative dance; trip hop; indie pop
- Occupations: Musician; songwriter; journalist; DJ
- Instruments: Keyboards; programming; guitar
- Years active: 1990–present
- Labels: Heavenly; Icerink; EMI Disc
- Member of: Saint Etienne
- Website: Bob Stanley website

Bob Stanley (born Robert Andrew Shukman; 25 December 1964) is a British musician, journalist, author, and film producer. He is a member of the indie pop group Saint Etienne and has had a parallel career as a music journalist and author, writing for NME, Melody Maker, Mojo, The Guardian and The Times, as well as writing several books on music and football. His second book, Yeah! Yeah! Yeah!: The Story of Modern Pop, was published by Faber & Faber in 2013. His third book Let's Do It: The Birth of Pop Music: A History was published by Pegasus in 2022. He also has a career as a DJ and as a producer of record labels, and has collaborated on a series of films about London.

== Early life ==
Stanley is of Scottish and Ukrainian Jewish descent. He was educated at Whitgift School in Croydon, London.

== Saint Etienne ==
Stanley is a member of the group Saint Etienne, for whom he co-writes songs and produces. Live on stage, he normally plays keyboards.

== Writing ==
=== Journalism ===
After leaving school, Stanley worked in various record shops. While working at Virgin Records in Peterborough, he met Andrew Midgley (with whom he would later create the group Cola Boy). The two produced a fanzine called Pop Avalanche in 1986. Stanley also wrote four issues of Caff, a fanzine created with childhood friend Pete Wiggs (with whom he would later form Saint Etienne).

In 1987, Stanley sent an issue of Caff to James Brown, then live reviews editor for NME. This led to Stanley's first commissioned work, a review of a Johnny Cash show in Peterborough. After two years he moved to Melody Maker, where he wrote regularly until Saint Etienne became a full-time occupation in 1991.

Even as Saint Etienne dominated his career, Stanley continued to write occasionally for The Face and Mojo in the 1990s. In the 2000s he has returned to journalism, writing about art and architecture as well as music. He contributes regularly to various publications including The Times and The Guardian.

=== Books ===
Stanley has written two books that document the history of popular music. The 2013 book Yeah Yeah Yeah: The Story of Modern Pop examines the history of pop music from the publication of the first British pop chart in 1952 until the advent of iTunes. Reviewing the book in The American Conservative, Robert Dean Lurie wrote: “What a joy it is to find a music writer who didn’t get the rock-critic memo—the one that says you’re supposed to worship at the altar of punk rock, praise Radiohead, and hate the Eagles. Stanley has plenty of nice things to say about the Eagles, the Bee Gees, Hall and Oates, and Abba.” In 2022, Stanley published a follow-up book Let's Do It: The Birth of Pop Music: A History, which examines the history of popular music from the beginning of recorded sound until the advent of rock and roll in the 1950s. Reviewing the book in The Guardian, Alexis Petridis wrote: “Its 656 pages are a perfect guidebook, filled with smart thinking and the kind of communicable enthusiasm that sends you rushing to the nearest streaming service, eager to hear what all the fuss was about.”

In 2007, with Paul Kelly, Stanley edited Match Day, a book of football programme artwork.

In 2023, Stanley published Bee Gees: Children of the World, a biography of the Bee Gees, with Nine Eight Books, an imprint of Bonnier Books.

Stanley was the winner of the 2017 Eccles British Library Writers in Residence Award, which supported his research for Let's Do It using the Library's American collections.

== Film ==
While recording the album Finisterre in 2002, Stanley, Pete Wiggs and frequent collaborator Paul Kelly made a film to accompany the record, also titled Finisterre, which was described by The Observer as a "cinematic hymn to London". It premiered at the Institute of Contemporary Arts in London and was screened around the world by one dot zero.

In 2005, Saint Etienne and Kelly were invited by the Barbican Centre to create a film and music event, for which they made What Have You Done Today Mervyn Day, a drama-documentary set in the Lower Lea Valley, the site for the 2012 Olympic Games. In 2007, their third London film, This Is Tomorrow, a history of the Southbank Centre, premiered with a live performance, including a 60-piece orchestra, at the Royal Festival Hall.

Kelly and Saint Etienne collaborated again on How We Used to Live (2014), which has been described as "a cherishable, woozy-hazy trawl of London from postwar days to yuppiedom".

Stanley has curated several film seasons for arts institutions including the Barbican, including Gonna Make You A Star (a series of pop documentaries) and Britain Learns to Rock (early British Rock'n'Roll movies).

In 2016, he was commissioned by 14-18 Now as creative producer on a project to explore the impact of the First World War on the north-east of England. The resulting film and music commission, Asunder, featuring a film directed by artist-filmmaker Esther Johnson, co-produced and scripted by Stanley, and a soundtrack by Field Music and Warm Digits, premiered at the Sunderland Empire in July 2016 and later toured to the Barbican in London.

In 2017, as part of Hull 2017: UK City of Culture's Mind on the Run season exploring the influence and legacy of jazz composer Basil Kirchin, Stanley co-directed a short film, Abstractions of Holderness, filmed in the isolated area of the east coast of England where Kirchin settled in the 1970s. Pete Wiggs composed the soundtrack, which was performed at the Mind on the Run concert by the BBC Concert Orchestra and various musicians who had collaborated with Kirchin in the past.

== Record labels ==
In the late 1980s and early 1990s, Stanley briefly ran a record label called Caff Records, which released 17 7" singles, all limited to 500 copies, including early singles by the Manic Street Preachers and Pulp. Between 1992 and 1994, Stanley and Saint Etienne bandmate Pete Wiggs ran the indie label Icerink Records; the most notable act to emerge from this endeavour was the girl-group Shampoo. In 1996, Stanley ran EMIDisc, again alongside Wiggs, backed by EMI Director of A&R Tris Penna. The label was to be an EMI sub-label devoted to new talent. The label was short-lived, releasing albums by Kenickie and Denim. Stanley and Wiggs also previously ran a CD imprint called Eclipse through Universal. Stanley started his own imprint, Croydon Municipal, via Cherry Red in 2012, specialising in music from the mid-twentieth century.

== Record collecting ==
Stanley is known for his large collection of vinyl records. When Saint Etienne are between projects, he DJs, playing generally 1960s and 1970s pop music and soul. With Wiggs, he ran a club called Don't Laugh in the mid-1990s in Maida Vale. Cherrybomb, a girl group night in Bloomsbury, ran from 2006 to 2009.

He regularly works as a consultant for reissue record labels, notably Ace Records. English Weather, which he compiled with bandmate Pete Wiggs, was named The Guardian's Album of the Week in January 2017. He has written liner notes for many reissues, including box sets by Joe Meek, Sandie Shaw and the Searchers.

== Personal life ==
Stanley was previously married to Anneliese Midgley, but the couple later divorced, remaining close friends. She later became MP for Knowsley, Stanley having supported her election campaign by allowing her to use the band's track "Only Love Can Break Your Heart" in a campaign video.

Stanley lives with his girlfriend and their son, dividing his time between London and West Yorkshire.

== Bibliography ==
- Match Day: Official Football Programmes. London: Fuel, 2006., ISBN 978-0-95500-614-2
- Yeah! Yeah! Yeah!: The Story of Pop Music from Bill Haley to Beyoncé. New York: W. W. Norton & Company, 2014, ISBN 978-0-39324269-0
- Let's Do It: The Birth of Pop Music: A History. New York: Pegasus Books, 2022, ISBN 978-1-63936-463-3
