= You're in a Bad Way =

1993 single by Saint Etienne

Single by Saint Etienne

from the album So Tough
- B-side: "Archway People"; "California Snow Story"; "Duke Duvet"
- Released: 1 February 1993
- Genre: Pop
- Length: 3:20
- Label: Heavenly; Warner
- Songwriters: Bob Stanley; Pete Wiggs; Sarah Cracknell
- Producers: Saint Etienne (album version); Alan Tarney (single version)

Saint Etienne singles chronology
"Avenue" (1992)	"You're in a Bad Way" (1993)	"Hobart Paving" (1993)

Music video
- "You're in a Bad Way" on YouTube

"You're in a Bad Way" is a song by British pop group Saint Etienne, released in February 1993 by Heavenly and Warner Bros. Records as the second single from their second album, So Tough (1993). The song is a deliberately old-fashioned throwback to 1960s pop music. In an interview with Melody Maker magazine, Bob Stanley claims that it was written in ten minutes as a simple imitation of Herman's Hermits, and was only intended to be a B-side to "Everlasting", but the record company decided that it should be a single. "Everlasting" was dropped as a single and remained unreleased until it was eventually included on disc 2 on the deluxe edition of So Tough in 2009.

The album version of the song begins with a sample from the film Billy Liar (1963): "A man could lose himself in London. Lose himself. Lose himself. Lose himself in London!" The lyrics describe a man who is depressed and has ceased to care for himself - the singer tells him "jeans are old and your hair's all wrong / Don't you know that crewcuts and trainers are out again?" The singer invites him to "Just dial my number or call my name". It also makes reference to "watching Bruce on the old Generation Game", which led to the song being self-mockingly described as "the one about Bruce Forsyth" in the sleevenotes to the compilation Too Young to Die – Singles 1990–1995.

On the CD single (but not the other formats), pieces of dialogue follow each track to segue into the next. Between "You're In a Bad Way" and "Archway People", there is a sample of dialogue from the film Brighton Rock (1947) spoken by Richard Attenborough. The third b-side, "Duke Duvet" is based on a drum break from "Enjoy the Silence" by Depeche Mode, and concludes with a comic monologue called "Spong-Bake" written by Christopher Morris.

In 2019 the writer and theatre maker John Osborne used the song as the starting point for his theatre show You're in a Bad Way, a storytelling show about dementia, music and festivals.

== Release ==
"You're in a Bad Way" was one of the group's biggest hits, reaching #12 on the UK Singles Chart. In Iceland the song reached #26. The single, produced by Alan Tarney, is different from the version on the UK edition of So Tough, with a "brighter" arrangement featuring chimes and an alternate vocal for the last chorus. The US and Australian editions of "So Tough" use the single version of the track.

== Critical reception ==
Stephen Thomas Erlewine from AllMusic named the song a "stand out" of the album. Larry Flick from Billboard magazine wrote that the "sweet and perky British trio is gunning for pop radio with this sweet and perky synth number." He added that "feathery vocals and faint island percussion will make listeners want to go roller-skating, or at least bop happily along when they hear this one on the radio." Linda Ryan from the Gavin Report described the song as a "Dusty Springfield-does-Motown gem". Kingston Informer viewed it as "trite but memorable". In his weekly UK chart commentary, James Masterton wrote, "...I make no apologies whatsoever about saying to the world in general that it has been a long long time since a record of such genius has made the charts. Having made their name with a series of ambient, dreamy dance hits which include a cover of Neil Young's 'Only Love Can Break Your Heart' the band get their biggest hit ever with this masterpiece of classic pop. Sounding all at once like several old tracks at once". Simon Reynolds from Melody Maker said, "I'm not crazy about this new St Etienne record. While it's not as fluffy and frothy as 'Join Our Club', it's certainly no sequel to the sublime 'Avenue', either."

Simon Williams from NME commented, "'You're in a Bad Way' is a pop purist's wet dream, all saccharine-drenched vocals, post-modern ironic topspins and sly references to The Generation Game, all less overtly dancefloor friendly than 'Only Love Can Break Your Heart', but still kitsch and strange." The magazine's Ted Kessler complimented it as "a genuinely good song with bits you could hum and everything". Neil Spencer from The Observer felt the trio's "fey sensibilities" work well on the track, "which sets Sarah Cracknell's dreamy voice to an innocuous backing". Armond White from Rolling Stone noted its "girl-group pledge". Another Rolling Stone editor, Rob Sheffield, considered it a "perfect" UK hit. Andrew Harrison from Select wrote, "The wurlitzer Motown trappings of 'You're in a Bad Way' cloak a pearl of a tune." Mark Frith from Smash Hits gave it five out of five and named it Best New Single, adding that this is a "lively, warm, best friend of a record." In his review of the album, Smash Hits editor Peter Stanton stated that the singles 'Avenue' and 'You're in a Bad Way' "are classic pop beauties".

== Music video ==
There were made two different music videos for the song. One is a low-budget production featuring split-screen photography of the band performing in a blank space and wearing restrained 60s attire. The other is more spectacular: the band performs in a stylized, garishly-coloured version of a 1960s TV show, with scantily-clad dancers and a backdrop of retro home furnishing. This version was later made available on Saint Etienne's official YouTube channel in 2009.

== Track listing ==
All tracks written and composed by Stanley and Wiggs; except where indicated

- 7" - Heavenly / HVN 25 and Cassette (HVN 25 CS)
1. "You're in a Bad Way" (Cracknell, Stanley, Wiggs) - 3:20
2. "Archway People" - 3:26
- 7" - Warner / 9-18563-7
1. "You're in a Bad Way" (Cracknell, Stanley, Wiggs) - 3:02
2. "California Snow Story" - 4:20
- 12" - Heavenly / HVN 25-12 and CD (HVN 25CD)
1. "You're in a Bad Way" (Cracknell, Stanley, Wiggs) - 3:20
2. "Archway People" - 3:26
3. "California Snow Story" - 4:20
4. "Duke Duvet" - 3:09
- CD - Warner / PRO-CD-5948
1. "You're in a Bad Way" (Cracknell, Stanley, Wiggs) - 3:08
2. "You're in a Bad Way" (Alternative Mix) (Cracknell, Stanley, Wiggs) - 2:43
3. "St. Etienne Speaks..." - 9:17 ("St. Etienne Speaks... The truth and trauma in their own words behind England's dukes and duchess of pop!")

== Charts ==
Chart (1993)	Peak position
Europe (Eurochart Hot 100)	66
Iceland (Íslenski Listinn Topp 40)	26
Israel (Israeli Singles Chart)	11
UK Singles (Official Charts)	12
UK Airplay (Music Week)	17
UK Dance (Music Week)	9
UK Indie (Music Week)	1
