= You Need a Mess of Help to Stand Alone (album) =

1993 compilation album by Saint Etienne

Compilation album by Saint Etienne
- Released: 6 December 1993
- Recorded: 1990–1993
- Length: 49:02
- Label: Heavenly
- Producer: Saint Etienne

Saint Etienne chronology
So Tough (1993)	You Need a Mess of Help to Stand Alone (1993)	Tiger Bay (1994)

Professional ratings
Review scores
Source	Rating
AllMusic	3/5 stars
NME	6/10

You Need a Mess of Help to Stand Alone is the first compilation album by English band Saint Etienne, released on 6 December 1993 by Heavenly Recordings. It compiles singles and B-sides released by the group during the period between 1990 and 1993, most notably the non-album singles "Kiss and Make Up" (1990), "Speedwell" (1991), "Join Our Club/People Get Real" (1992) and "Who Do You Think You Are" (1993). The compilation's title is derived from the song of the same name by the Beach Boys.

Receiving good reviews, the compilation was released on CD, cassette and LP formats. Artwork was designed by Anthony Sweeney with photography by Aude Prieur and James Fry. Before its release as a standalone compilation album, the disc was originally packaged in a 2CD limited edition reissue of So Tough.

All tracks have since been released on other compilations and deluxe editions of the group's studio albums rendering the compilation technically obsolete.

== Track listing ==
All tracks are written by Bob Stanley and Pete Wiggs, except where noted.

No.	Title	Writer(s)	Length
1.	"Who Do You Think You Are"	Des Dyer, Clive Scott	3:55
2.	"Archway People"		3:21
3.	"California Snow Story"		4:20
4.	"Kiss and Make Up" (extended version) (featuring Donna Savage)	Robert Wratten, Michael Hiscock	6:19
5.	"Duke Duvet"		3:12
6.	"Filthy" (featuring Q-Tee)	Stanley, Wiggs, Tatiana Mais	5:31
7.	"Join Our Club"		3:17
8.	"Paper"	Sarah Cracknell, Maurice Deebank	4:09
9.	"People Get Real"		4:45
10.	"Some Place Else"		3:42
11.	"Speedwell"		6:31

- Tracks 2, 3 and 5 are B-sides to "You're in a Bad Way"
- Tracks 8 and 10 are B-sides to "Avenue"
- Track 6 is the B-side to "Only Love Can Break Your Heart"
- Track 11 is the B-side to "Nothing Can Stop Us"

== Personnel ==
Credits adapted from the liner notes of You Need a Mess of Help to Stand Alone.

- Debsey – additional vocal ("Who Do You Think You Are")
- Donna Savage – vocal ("Kiss and Make Up")
- Q-Tee – vocal ("Filthy")
- Aude Prieur – booklet photography
- James Fry – Saint Etienne picture
- Anthony Sweeney – design
- Author Unknown – liner notes (extract from Brian Clough, Folk Hero)

== Charts ==
Chart performance for You Need a Mess of Help to Stand Alone
Chart (1993)	Peak position
UK Independent Albums (OCC)	2
