= Love City Groove (song) =

1995 song by Love City Groove

Single by Love City Groove

from the album Hard Times
- Released: 27 March 1995
- Genre: Pop reggae; dance; hip hop
- Length: 3:55 (7-inch mix); 5:47 (12-inch mix)
- Label: China; Planet 3
- Songwriters: Stephen "Beanz" Rudden; Tatiana Mais; Paul Hardy; Jay Williams
- Producers: Beanz; George Stewart

Eurovision Song Contest 1995 entry
- Country: United Kingdom
- Artists: MC Reason; Paul Hardy; Beanz; Jay Williams
- As: Love City Groove
- Language: English
- Composers: Stephen Rudden; Tatiana Mais; Paul Hardy; Jay Williams
- Lyricists: Stephen Rudden; Tatiana Mais; Paul Hardy; Jay Williams
- Conductor: Mike Dixon

Finals performance
- Final result: 10th
- Final points: 76

Entry chronology
- ◄ "We Will Be Free (Lonely Symphony)" (1994)
- "Ooh Aah... Just a Little Bit" (1996) ►

Music video
- "Love City Groove" on YouTube

"Love City Groove" is a song by British rap group Love City Groove that represented the United Kingdom at the Eurovision Song Contest 1995.

== The song ==
The song was written by Stephen "Beanz" Rudden, Tatiana Mais, Paul Hardy, and Jay Williams. It was released by China Records and Planet 3 as a single from Love City Groove's album Hard Times on 27 March 1995. It was subsequently released in several versions in the same year, with three remixed versions released in Germany in 1996. Another version was released in Japan in 2003 for DJ use only.

== Chart success ==
"Love City Groove" reached number seven on the UK Singles Chart that May, selling over 200,000 copies. The vocals were performed in hip hop style by Williams and the only female band member, Yinka Charles, performing as Reason. The accompanying music video was a Box Top on British music television channel The Box in June 1995.

== Critical reception ==
John Bush from AllMusic deemed "Love City Groove" "an upbeat pop/reggae track". Larry Flick from Billboard magazine described it as a "fun" and "infectious hybrid of reggae, pop, and hip-hop styles". In his weekly UK chart commentary, James Masterton noted that the song, being in "a soul/dance vein", "certainly [is] one of the most credible records to be a British Eurovision entry for years".

Tim Jeffery from Music Week's RM Dance Update wrote, "A very pleasant mid-tempo groove with great vocals and a bit of rapping that swings along beautifully in quite old-fashioned jazz funk way and it really gets on your brain. Only trouble is it's a real summer tune — released at the right time this could be another Zhane." Iestyn George from NME praised it as an "impossibly sunny soulful hip-hop groove", noting that it features Saint Etienne collaborator QT, RPM's Jay Williams and Dina Carroll backing vocalist Paul Hardy.

== Eurovision Song Contest 1995 ==
Jonathan King, then working for BBC Television, tasked with finding and producing an entry for Eurovision, requested that the song be submitted for the "A Song for Europe" contest in 1995. The selectors were looking for something different from past British Eurovision entries, that better represented what was popular in the charts. The band members were all from different backgrounds, and multi-racial. Hardy's father was from Cyprus, Williams is of Hispanic background, and Reason (Yinka Charles) is Jamaican/Irish.

After "Love City Groove" won A Song for Europe with 70,000 votes, controversy arose when it was alleged that the song had broken contest rules for receiving extensive airplay before the selection process, as it had been previously available as a white label release. At the time, the rules stated that a song was not allowed to receive airplay before the contest, but seven British radio stations broadcast the song 27 times in early 1995, including BBC Radio 1. Following an investigation led by A Song for Europe producer Kevin Bishop, it was determined that the song had not violated contest rules since its airplay ultimately did not affect the contest's results. This decision upset several managers of the competing entrants, including Tom Watkins (representing Deuce) and Laurie Jay (representing Dear Jon). Jay called the decision a "scam," and Watkins refused to participate in the contest again, saying, "People might say I've got sour grapes, but I'm in third place anyway so I'm out of the running. I just think it's a bloody mockery."

On the night of the Eurovision Song Contest, "Love City Groove" was performed 15th in the running order, following Belgium's Frédéric Etherlinck with "La voix est libre" and preceding Portugal's Tó Cruz with "Baunilha e chocolate". It received 76 points, placing 10th in a field of 23. It was succeeded as UK representative at the 1996 contest by Gina G with "Ooh Aah... Just a Little Bit".

== Charts ==
=== Weekly charts ===
Chart (1995)	Peak position
Europe (Eurochart Hot 100)	28
Iceland (Íslenski Listinn Topp 40)	15
Ireland (IRMA)	28
Israel (Israeli Singles Chart)	11
Scottish Singles Sales (Official Charts)	20
UK Singles (Official Charts)	7
UK Dance (Official Charts)	35
UK Hip Hop/R&B (Official Charts)	3
UK Airplay (Music Week)	6
UK Club Chart (Music Week)	72
UK Indie (Music Week)	1

=== Year-end charts ===
Chart (1995)	Position
UK Singles (OCC)	83

== Release history ==
Region	Date	Format(s)	Label(s)	Ref.
United Kingdom	27 March 1995	12-inch vinyl; CD; cassette	China; Planet 3	
Australia	12 June 1995	CD; cassette	Festival	

Preceded by "Lonely Symphony (We Will Be Free)" by Frances Ruffelle	United Kingdom in the Eurovision Song Contest; 1995	Succeeded by "Ooh Aah... Just a Little Bit" by Gina G
