= United Kingdom in the Eurovision Song Contest 1995 =

- Eurovision Song Contest 1995
- Participating broadcaster: British Broadcasting Corporation (BBC)
- Country: United Kingdom
- Selection process: A Song for Europe 1995
- Selection date: 31 March 1995

Competing entry
- Song: "Love City Groove"
- Artist: Love City Groove
- Songwriters: Paul Hardy; Jay Williams; Tatiana Mais; Stephen Rudden

Placement
- Final result: 10th, 76 points

Participation chronology

The United Kingdom was represented at the Eurovision Song Contest 1995 with the song "Love City Groove", written by Paul Hardy, Jay Williams, Tatiana Mais and Stephen Rudden, and performed by Love City Groove. The British participating broadcaster, the British Broadcasting Corporation (BBC), selected its entry through a national final. It finished in 10th place with a total of 76 points.

== Before Eurovision ==
=== A Song for Europe 1995 ===
The British Broadcasting Corporation (BBC) developed A Song for Europe 1995 in order to select its entry for the Eurovision Song Contest 1995. Eight acts competed in a televised show on 31 March 1995 held at the BBC Television Centre in London and hosted by Terry Wogan. The winner was selected entirely through a public vote. The final was broadcast on BBC1 and BBC Radio 2 with commentary by Ken Bruce, while the results show was broadcast on BBC1.

After the UK only achieved a low top ten finish the previous year, the BBC returned to a format last seen in 1991 where different acts performed, each song was also introduced by a Eurovision style "postcard" style video showcasing the song writers introduced by Jonathan King. The panel was adapted into a famous celebrity "supporter", with the public televote remaining.

==== Competing entries ====
BBC collaborated with music producer Jonathan King to select eight finalists to compete in the national final. The eight competing songs were premiered during the Top of the Pops Song for Europe Special on BBC1 on 24 March 1995.

==== Final ====
Eight acts competed in the televised final on 31 March 1995. Each song was introduced by a supporter who championed the songs during the show. The supporters consisted of Tony Mortimer, Bruno Brookes, Ian Dury, Let Loose, Scarlet, Cheryl Baker, Mike Read, and Jonathan King. A public televote selected the winner, "Love City Groove" performed by Love City Groove.

A Song for Europe 1995 – 31 March 1995
R/O	Artist	Song	Songwriter(s)	Televote	Place
1	Deuce	"I Need You"	Ian Curnow, Phil Harding, Robert Kean	73,467	3
2	Paul Harris Band	"Spinning Away"	Paul Harris, Martin Smith	19,239	7
3	Londonbeat	"I'm Just Your Puppet on a... (String!)"	Jimmy Chambers, Liam Henshall, Jimmy Helms, George Chandler	35,434	6
4	Sox	"Go for the Heart"	Samantha Fox, Jonathan Durno	65,436	4
5	Fff	"Then There's a Knock at the Door"	Eric Stewart, Graham Gouldman	17,216	8
6	Dear Jon	"One Gift of Love"	Graeme Watson	81,359	2
7	Simon Spiro	"Rainbows and You"	John Wilson, Malcolm Maddock	43,299	5
8	Love City Groove	"Love City Groove"	Stephen Rudden, Tatiana Mais, Jay Williams, Paul Hardy	140,174	1

== At Eurovision ==
The United Kingdom performed 15th on the night, following Belgium and preceding Portugal. Love City Groove received 76 points and finished joint 10th with Malta. The UK jury awarded 12 points to Israel.

The contest was broadcast on BBC1 and on BBC Prime, both with commentary by Terry Wogan.

=== Voting ===
Points awarded to the United Kingdom
Score	Country
12 points	Austria; France
10 points	Portugal
8 points	
7 points	Belgium; Denmark; Hungary
6 points	
5 points	Israel; Poland; Sweden
4 points	Bosnia and Herzegovina
3 points	
2 points	
1 point	Ireland; Russia

Points awarded by the United Kingdom
Score	Country
12 points	Israel
10 points	Slovenia
8 points	Spain
7 points	Malta
6 points	Sweden
5 points	Austria
4 points	Norway
3 points	Cyprus
2 points	Turkey
1 point	France
