= Foxbase Alpha =

Studio album by Saint Etienne
- Released: 14 October 1991
- Recorded: 1990–1991
- Studio: Cat Music (London)
- Genres: Indie pop; ambient dance; sophisti-pop; synth-pop; techno
- Length: 48:27
- Label: Heavenly
- Producer: Saint Etienne

Saint Etienne chronology
Foxbase Alpha (1991)	So Tough (1993)

Singles from Foxbase Alpha
- 1. "Only Love Can Break Your Heart" Released: May 1990; 2. "Kiss and Make Up" Released: September 1990; 3. "Nothing Can Stop Us" Released: May 1991; 4. "Only Love Can Break Your Heart (reissue)" Released: August 1991

Foxbase Alpha is the debut studio album by English band Saint Etienne, released on 14 October 1991 by Heavenly Recordings.

The album was recorded in a style which drew on the club culture and house music of the time, but also incorporates the group's characteristic love of 1960s pop, with tracks also bridged by samples from films or by short songs. At the time of recording, Sarah Cracknell was not fully part of the group, and as a result she does not sing on "Only Love Can Break Your Heart", which is sung by Moira Lambert.

Foxbase Alpha was on the shortlist of nominees for the 1992 Mercury Prize. It was accompanied by several successful singles, including "Nothing Can Stop Us". The album was also included in the book 1001 Albums You Must Hear Before You Die.

== Songs ==
The album includes one of the group's best-known songs: a cover of Neil Young's "Only Love Can Break Your Heart". The cover quite differs from the original in that the original's mostly major chord progression is turned here into mostly minor, which emphasises a more melancholic feel. It is also arranged in 4/4 (as opposed to the original's waltz time), with a driving piano-bass-drum section. Andrew Weatherall later remixed the song to further emphasise the dub bassline; this remix was featured on both releases of the single and on the compilation Casino Classics (on American and European versions of the single, a Flowered Up remix is erroneously featured instead of the Andrew Weatherall mix). The follow-up single "Kiss and Make Up" was also a cover version, of a song written and originally recorded by The Field Mice. Ian Catt was the engineer/co-producer on both versions.

"Carnt Sleep" is based on the Youthman riddim, a backing track that reggae producer Glen Brown has used on dozens of records since the late 1970s. "Wilson" is based on a loop of the intro to Wilson Pickett's version of "Hey Jude" and spoken samples from a decimalisation training record. "Nothing Can Stop Us", one of the group's most famous singles, features a very prominent sample of Dusty Springfield's track, "I Can't Wait Until I See My Baby's Face" (from her 1967 album Where Am I Going?). Saint Etienne later recorded a version of "Nothing Can Stop Us" with vocals by Kylie Minogue.

The lyrics of "Like the Swallow" are from a Newfoundland folk song, "She's Like the Swallow".

The dialogue heard in the track "Etienne Gonna Die" is from the movie House of Games.

Saint Etienne members have named OMD's Dazzle Ships as a prominent influence on the album.

== Artwork ==
The young woman on the cover of Foxbase Alpha, Celina Nash, was a member of the group Golden alongside Lucy Gillie and Candida Richardson; they released two singles ("Anglo American"/"Don't Destroy Me" in 1992, and "Wishful Thinking", written by Jarvis Cocker, in 1993) on Bob Stanley and Pete Wiggs's Icerink Records label. Nash also appears in Saint Etienne's 1993 album So Tough; she is the waitress who can be heard on "Chicken Soup". She is also in the video for the Pulp song "Babies".

== Critical reception ==
Professional ratings
Review scores
Source	Rating
AllMusic	3.5/5 stars
Entertainment Weekly	B+
The Irish Times	5/5 stars
Mojo	4/5 stars
NME	8/10
The Observer	5/5 stars
Pitchfork	8.7/10
Record Collector	4/5 stars
The Rolling Stone Album Guide	3/5 stars
Select	4/5

Writing for Melody Maker, Simon Reynolds was impressed by how Saint Etienne's "learned eclecticism" and "pop-about-pop approach" had yielded a cohesive album instead of a "whimsical pick'n'mix", calling Foxbase Alpha "a record that charms you into a gooey stupor, rather than burns your eye with visionary vastness." In NME, Tim Southwell lauded the album as "touching, humorous and genuinely bloody interesting", crediting Saint Etienne for "pulling their influences together with a conviction all their own."

== Releases ==
=== US edition ===
The US version of the album, released in January 1992, adds two bonus tracks: a new version of "Kiss and Make Up", rerecorded with Cracknell, and a unique version of "People Get Real", which was released as a double 'A' side single with "Join Our Club" later the same year.

=== 2009 Deluxe Edition ===
The album was re-released in May 2009 as part of the Universal Music Deluxe Edition re-issue program. The album has been remastered, and is accompanied by a second disc featuring B-sides, mixes and five previously unreleased tracks. The CD booklet features new sleeve notes by Jon Savage, and Tom Ewing of Freaky Trigger, with images and memorabilia.

Also released was a boxed-set version, which was limited to 1000 copies. In addition to the two CDs this package also included a 6" Subbuteo figure and a replica Foxbase Alpha poster, as well as a set of four badges.

=== Foxbase Beta ===
In 2009, Foxbase Alpha was 're-produced' and remixed from the original multi-tracks by Richard X. This new version was called Foxbase Beta, and was packaged with an additional CD titled Foxbase Extra, featuring a commentary on the album by Bob Stanley, Pete Wiggs and Richard X, and additional out-takes. A single disc version was sold at their 2009 shows and through Rough Trade Records in London.

=== 25th Anniversary Edition ===
Available for pre-order in 2016, the 25th Anniversary Edition shipped in 2017. The set included the original album pressed on two 12" vinyl records, a second 12" vinyl record entitled Remains of the Day with additional tracks not previously available on vinyl, and a 7" single of Kiss and Make Up, featuring vocals by Moira Lambert. In addition to this, the special edition included a 12"x12" book, download code for the entire album in MP3 format, as well as reproductions of promotional material from the original release.

== Track listing ==
=== 1991 releases ===
All tracks are written by Bob Stanley and Pete Wiggs; except where noted.

CD, LP, Cassette: Heavenly HVNLP1CD (UK and Europe)
No.	Title	Writer(s)	Length
1.	"This Is Radio Etienne"		0:42
2.	"Only Love Can Break Your Heart"	Neil Young	4:29
3.	"Wilson"		1:59
4.	"Carnt Sleep"		4:43
5.	"Girl VII"		3:46
6.	"Spring"		3:43
7.	"She's the One"		3:09
8.	"Stoned to Say the Least"		7:42
9.	"Nothing Can Stop Us"		4:21
10.	"Etienne Gonna Die"		1:32
11.	"London Belongs to Me"		3:57
12.	"Like the Swallow"		7:41
13.	"Dilworth's Theme"		0:38

CD: Warner Bros. 26793 (US)
No.	Title	Writer(s)	Length
1.	"This Is Radio Etienne"		0:42
2.	"Only Love Can Break Your Heart"	Neil Young	4:29
3.	"Wilson"		1:59
4.	"Carnt Sleep"		4:43
5.	"Girl VII"		3:46
6.	"Spring"		3:43
7.	"She's the One"		3:09
8.	"People Get Real"		4:44
9.	"Stoned to Say the Least"		7:42
10.	"Nothing Can Stop Us"		4:21
11.	"Etienne Gonna Die"		1:32
12.	"London Belongs to Me"		3:57
13.	"Kiss and Make Up" (Sarah Cracknell version)	Robert Wratten, Michael Hiscock	5:14
14.	"Like the Swallow"		7:41
15.	"Dilworth's Theme"		0:38

=== 2009 release ===
CD: Heavenly HVNLP1CDDE – Disc two
No.	Title	Writer(s)	Length
1.	"Kiss and Make Up" (extended version)	Wratten, Hiscock	6:19
2.	"Filthy"	Stanley, Wiggs, Mais	5:33
3.	"Chase HQ"		3:30
4.	"Sally Space"		5:02
5.	"The Reckoning"		1:28
6.	"Speedwell"		6:31
7.	"Parliament Hill"		2:35
8.	"People Get Real"		4:43
9.	"Sweet Pea"		4:46
10.	"Winter in America"		5:53
11.	"Fake 88"		5:02
12.	"Studio Kinda Filthy"	Stanley, Wiggs, Mais	4:57
13.	"Kiss and Make Up" (Sarah Cracknell Version)	Wratten, Hiscock	5:13
14.	"Sky's Dead"		7:26

== Personnel ==
The liner notes list the album's personnel as follows:

- Saint Etienne – producer
- Ian Catt – engineer (at Catt Music, Mitcham)
- Sarah Cracknell – vocals
- Bob Stanley – Roland Jupiter 4, Korg M1, tambourine
- Pete Wiggs – SCI Prophet 5, Emax sampler, bongos
- Ian Catt – guitars, keyboard programming
- Moira Lambert – vocals on "Only Love Can Break Your Heart"
- Harvey Williams – bass guitar on "Only Love Can Break Your Heart"
- Pete Heller – additional programming on "Kiss and Make Up"
- Bo Savage, Gazareth Sweeney, Uncle Vibes, Billy Nasty – The Inspirational Choir
- Joe Dilworth – photography
- Anthony Sweeney – sleeve design
- Paul the Tailor – suits
- Andrew Wickham – spin bowler
- Jerry Jaffe – American psyche
- Kate Askey – long leg
- Martin Kelly – the cage
- Celina Nash – girl with sign
- Jon Savage – liner notes

== B-sides ==
from "Only Love Can Break Your Heart"

- "Only Love Can Break Your Heart (Version)"
- "Only Love Can Break Your Heart (A Mix of Two Halves)" (Remixed by Andrew Weatherall)
- "The Official Saint Etienne World Cup Theme"

from "Kiss and Make Up"

- "Sky's Dead" (7-inch version)
- "Kiss and Make Up (Extended Version)"
- "Sky's Dead"
- "Kiss and Make Up (Midsummer Madness Mix)" (Remixed by Pete Heller)
- "Kiss and Make (Midsummer Dubness Mix)" (Remixed by Pete Heller)

from "Nothing Can Stop Us" / "Speedwell"

- "Speedwell"
- "Speedwell (Flying Mix)" (Remixed by Dean Thatcher and Jagz)
- "Speedwell (Project Mix)" (Remixed by Dean Thatcher and Jagz)
- "Nothing Can Stop Us (Instrumental)"
- "3D Tiger"
- "Nothing Can Stop Us (Single Remix)" (Remixed by Masters at Work)
- "Nothing Can Stop Us (12" Remix)" (Remixed by Masters at Work)
- "Nothing Can Stop Us (House Mix)" (Remixed by Masters at Work)
- "Nothing Can Stop Us (Ken/Lou Dub)" (Remixed by Masters at Work)
- "Nothing Can Stop Us (Masters at Work Dub)"

from "Only Love Can Break Your Heart" (re-release)

- "Filthy"
- "Only Love Can Break Your Heart (Single Remix)"
- "Only Love Can Break Your Heart (KenLou B–Boy Mix)" (Remixed by Masters at Work)
- "Stoned to Say the Least (Album Version)"
- "Only Love Can Break Your Heart (Flowered Up Remix)"
- "Only Love Can Break Your Heart (Masters at Work Dub)"
- "Only Love Can Break Your Heart (Single-Album Version)"

== Charts ==
Chart performance for Foxbase Alpha
Chart (1991)	Peak position
UK Albums (Official Charts)	34
UK Independent Albums (OCC)	2
