= Caesar (song) =

Single by I Blame Coco featuring Robyn

from the album The Constant
- Released: 31 January 2010
- Recorded: 2009
- Genre: Electropop; new wave
- Length: 3:38
- Label: Island
- Songwriters: Coco Sumner, Klas Åhlund
- Producer: Klas Åhlund

I Blame Coco singles chronology
"Caesar" (2010)	"Splash" (2010)

Robyn singles chronology
"The Girl and the Robot" (2009)	"Caesar" (2010)	"Dancing on My Own" (2010)

Music video
- "Caesar" on YouTube

"Caesar" is a song by the English band I Blame Coco from their debut album, The Constant. Produced by Klas Åhlund, the track features Swedish singer Robyn and was released as the album's lead single on 31 January 2010. The accompanying music video, directed by directing duo Hope Audikana, was uploaded onto Island Records' official YouTube account on 17 December 2009.

== Critical reception ==
In a review for Digital Spy, Nick Levine called the song "quite a debut", stating that "Coco displays oodles of moody 'tude, referencing Lord Of The Flies and hissing lines like 'You're all f**king hopers', Ahlund keeps the production as lean and fuzzy as an undernourished duckling, and Robyn herself turns up to deliver the ear-snagging chorus." Joe O'Sullivan from This Is Fake DIY commented that "[t]he verse / chorus trade off between Coco and Robyn works very well, the contrast in their voices utilised to great effect as Robyn's impassioned singing is offset from Coco's by disinterested then snarling turns of 'We're going to knock down the walls, knock down the walls' as the end of the chorus approaches." Ian Gittins from Virgin Media described "Caesar" as "fantastic sub-Gaga electro-brat-pop and, most importantly, big fun." NME critic Alex Denney referred to the song as a "good-ass pop tune", whilst both Heather Phares of Allmusic and Louisa Emery of The Wharf noted it as a standout on The Constant.

== Track listings ==
UK iTunes EP

1. "Caesar" – 3:39
2. "Caesar" (Miike Snow Remix) – 3:50
3. "Ritalin" (Acoustic Demo) – 2:02

UK 10" single
A1. "Caesar" – 3:39
A2. "Ritalin" (Acoustic Demo) – 2:02
B1. "Caesar" (Miike Snow Remix) – 3:50

== Release history ==
Country	Date	Label	Format
United Kingdom	31 January 2010	Island Records	Digital EP
United Kingdom	1 February 2010	Island Records	10" single
