= Splash (Sub Focus song) =

Single by Sub Focus featuring Coco

from the album Sub Focus
- B-side: "Timewarp VIP"; "Coming Closer VIP"
- Released: 16 May 2010
- Recorded: 2009
- Genre: Drum and bass; electronic rock
- Length: 3:17
- Label: RAM
- Songwriters: Nick Douwma; Eliot Sumner; David Etherington; Karen Poole
- Producer: Sub Focus

Sub Focus singles chronology
| "Could This Be Real" (2010) | "Splash" (2010) | "Flashing Lights" (2011) |

Coco singles chronology
| "Caesar" (2010) | "Splash" (2010) | "Selfmachine" (2010) |

Music video
- "Splash" on YouTube

"Splash" is the fourth single from drum and bass artist Sub Focus to be released from his self-titled debut album Sub Focus. The single features vocals from British singer Coco and managed to reach number 41 on the UK Singles Chart upon release. The song is featured in the soundtrack to the video game F1 2010.

== Track listing ==
- Digital download (EP)

| No. | Title | Length |
|---|---|---|
| 1. | "Splash" (featuring Coco) | 3:17 |
| 2. | "Splash" (extended mix) | 4:45 |
| 3. | "Splash" (Rusko remix) (featuring Coco) | 4:08 |
| 4. | "Timewarp VIP" | 4:23 |

- Vinyl No. 1 (drum and bass)

| No. | Title | Length |
|---|---|---|
| 1. | "Splash" (extended mix) |
| 2. | "Timewarp VIP" |

- Vinyl No. 2 (dubstep)

| No. | Title | Length |
|---|---|---|
| 1. | "Splash" (Rusko remix) (featuring Coco) |
| 2. | "Coming Closer VIP" |

== Music video ==
A music video accompanying the single was released on 24 April 2010. The video features an actor posing as Sub Focus and Coco performing the song in an unknown location in East London, where Coco takes out her anger on a drum kit. At various stages throughout the music video, Coco is seen singing in front of the Continental Union Flag. To accompany the music, the lights flicker on and off throughout the music video, while Coco appears distorted for effect.

== Chart performance ==
"Splash" debuted on the UK Singles Chart at number 41 on 23 May 2010 as well as number seven on the UK Dance Chart. The following week, the single fell to number 73 and number eight, respectively. On 6 June 2010, "Splash" fell to number 91 before falling out of the top 100 the following week.

| Chart (2010) | Peak position |
|---|---|
| UK Singles (Official Charts) | 41 |
| UK Dance (Official Charts) | 7 |

== Release history ==
| Region | Date | Format |
|---|---|---|
| United Kingdom | 16 May 2010 | Digital download |
| United Kingdom | 17 May 2010 | CD |
| United Kingdom | 17 May 2010 | 12" |
