= The Look of Love (Dusty Springfield album) =

Studio album by Dusty Springfield
- Released: December 1967
- Recorded: London and New York, July – September 1967 (Tracks B3-4: November 1965)
- Genre: Pop
- Length: 28:50
- Labels: Philips (US); PHM 200–256 (mono); PHS 600-256 (stereo)
- Producers: Johnny Franz, Jerry Ragovoy

Dusty Springfield US albums 1964–1967 chronology
You Don't Have to Say You Love Me (1965)	The Look of Love (1967)	Dusty in Memphis (1969)

The Look of Love is the fifth album by singer Dusty Springfield to be released in the US, issued on the Philips Records label in late 1967. It gathered seven tracks from Springfield's British 1967 album Where Am I Going? with both the A- and B-sides of the singles "Give Me Time"/"The Look of Love" and "What's It Gonna Be"/"Small Town Girl" and became Springfield's final release on the Philips label in the US. In early 1968 she signed with Atlantic Records in America and as a consequence her 1968 album Dusty... Definitely, recorded for Philips in the UK, was not issued in the US at that time. Her next LP to be released in the North American market instead became her keynote work Dusty in Memphis. The tracks from the entire Dusty...Definitely album, the British recordings on the 1972 release See All Her Faces as well as a series of A- and B-side singles recorded in the UK between the years 1968 and 1972, were all first issued in the US in 1999 on the Rhino/Atlantic Records compilation Dusty in London.

The title track "The Look of Love", undoubtedly one of Springfield's best-known recordings, was first recorded with Burt Bacharach in January 1967 and included on the Casino Royale soundtrack album, issued on the Colgems label in the US and RCA in the UK. This Colgems issue became one of the most sought-after records of all time by US and European audiophiles (an excellent copy often selling for $300 to $500) after laudatory reviews by The Absolute Sound editor Harry Pearson and J. Gordon Holt of Stereophile. A second re-recorded version made with arranger Reg Guest in April that same year for Springfield's own record company Philips was surprisingly first relegated to the B-side of the single "Give Me Time" in both the UK and US. Despite this the song became a Top 30 hit (#22) in the US, the album was named after it, the track was later nominated for Best Film Song of the Year in the 1968 American Academy Awards, and the song is today considered one of Springfield's signature tunes.

The Look of Love album was first released on CD by Mercury Records/Universal Music in 1999, then with four bonus tracks.

Professional ratings
Review scores
Source	Rating
AllMusic	3/5 stars
Entertainment Weekly	(A)

== Track listing ==
All tracks from UK album Where Am I Going?, unless otherwise noted.

=== Side A ===
1. "The Look of Love" (UK version) (Burt Bacharach, Hal David) – 3:33
  - Recorded in London, 14 April 1967. First release: Philips UK single BF 1577, (B-side of "Give Me Time"), 19 May 1967.
2. "Give Me Time" (Pietro Melfa, Amadeo Tommasi, Alberto Marina, Peter Callander) – 3:05
  - Recorded in London, 14 April 1967. First release: Philips UK single BF 1577, (A-side).
3. "(They Long to Be) Close to You" (Bacharach, David) – 2:27
4. "If You Go Away (Ne Me Quitte Pas)" (Jacques Brel, Rod McKuen) – 3:50
5. "Sunny" (Bobby Hebb) – 1:52
6. "Come Back to Me" (Alan Jay Lerner, Burton Lane) – 2:04

=== Side B ===
1. "What's It Gonna Be?" (Jerry Ragovoy, Mort Shuman) – 2:11
  - Recorded in the US and at Philips Studios, London, July 1967. First release: Philips UK single BF 1608 (A-side), 22 September 1967.
2. "Welcome Home" (Chip Taylor) – 2:39
3. "Small Town Girl" (Arnold Goland, Aaron H. Schroeder) – 2:05
  - Recorded in London, 22 November 1965. First release: Philips UK single BF 1608 (B-side of "What's It Gonna Be"), 22 September 1967.
4. "Take Me for a Little While" (Trade Martin) – 2:22
5. "Chained to a Memory" (Kay Rogers, Richard Ahlert) – 2:36

=== Bonus tracks (1999 Reissue) ===
12. "I've Got a Good Thing" (Alternate take) (Ragovoy, Shuman) – 2:50
  - Outtake from the Where Am I Going? sessions. Previously unreleased.
13. "I Can't Wait Until I See My Baby's Face" (Ragovoy, Taylor) – 2:39
  - From Where Am I Going? First Release: Philips UK album BL 7820 (Mono) SBL 7820 (Stereo).
14. "I'll Try Anything" (Mark Barkan, Vic Millrose) – 2:24
  - Recorded at CBS Studios, New York and Philips Studios, London, January 1967. First release: Philips UK single BF 1553 (A-side), 17 February 1967.
15. "It's Over" (Jimmie Rodgers) – 2:34
  - Recorded in London, March 1968. Originally unissued. First release: The Look of Love (1999 reissue). First UK release: 4-CD box set Simply Dusty, 2000.

== Personnel and production ==
- Dusty Springfield – lead and backing vocals
- Lesley Duncan – backing vocals
- Madeline Bell – backing vocals
- The Echoes – accompaniment
- Alan Tew – accompaniment, orchestra director
- Arthur Greenslade – accompaniment, orchestra director
- Wally Stott – accompaniment, orchestra director
- Peter Knight – accompaniment, orchestra director
- Reg Guest – accompaniment, orchestra director
- Pat Williams – musical arranger
- Jim Tyler – musical arranger
- Johnnie Spence – musical arranger
- Johnny Franz – producer
- Jerry Ragovoy – producer ("What's It Gonna Be")
- Mort Shuman – arranger ("What's It Gonna Be")
- Garry Sherman – orchestra director ("What's It Gonna Be")
- Carole King – backing vocals ("What's It Gonna Be")
- Nicholas Ashford – backing vocals ("What's It Gonna Be")
- Valerie Simpson – backing vocals ("What It Gonna Be")
- Roger Wake – digital remastering (UK) (1999 reissue)
- Mike Gill – digital remastering (UK) (1999 reissue)
