= You Need a Mess of Help to Stand Alone =

You Need a Mess of Help to Stand Alone may refer to:

- "You Need a Mess of Help to Stand Alone" (song), a song by The Beach Boys
- You Need a Mess of Help to Stand Alone (album), an album by St. Etienne
