= Lisa del Bo =

Belgian singer (born 1961)

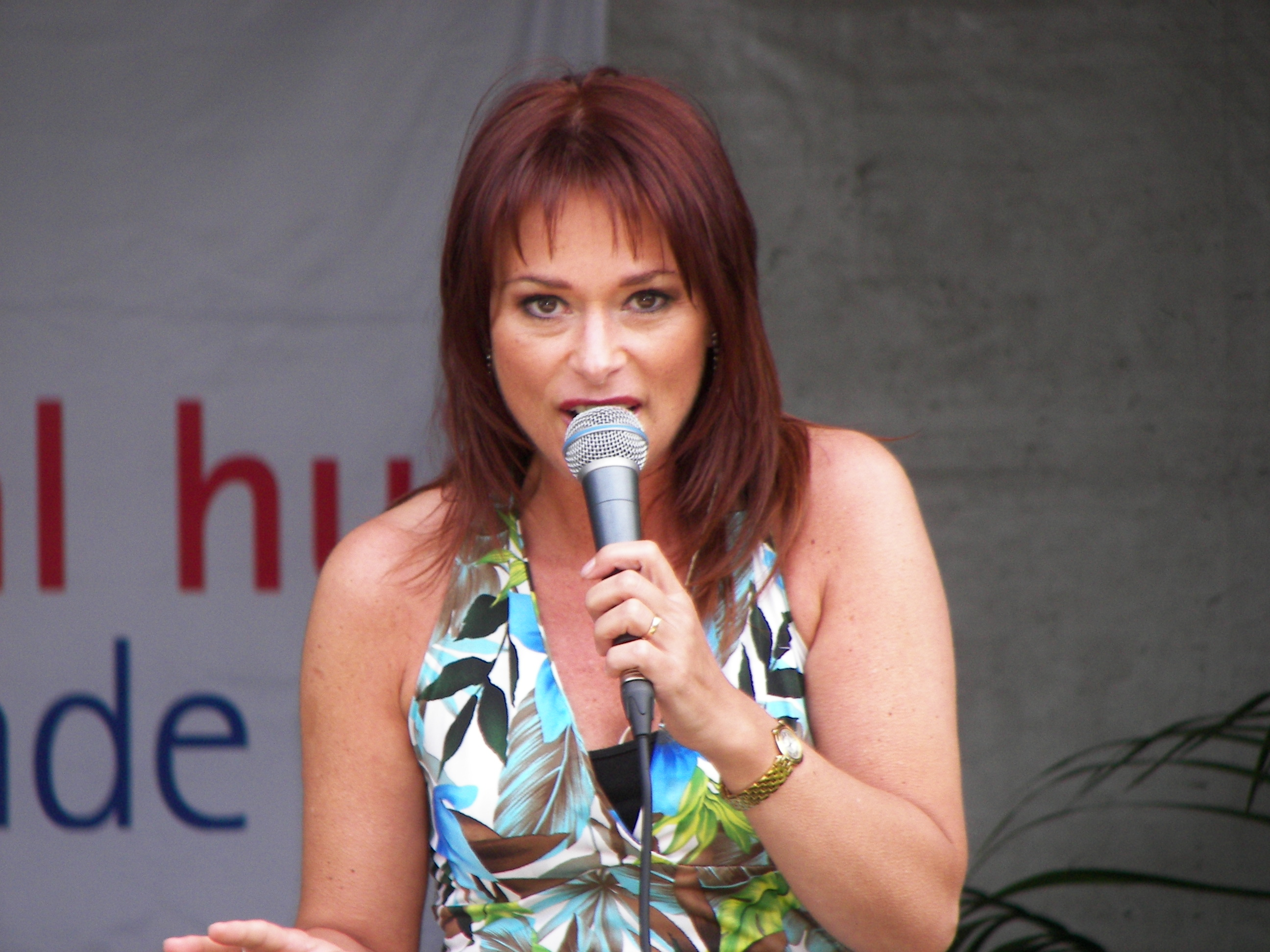
- del Bo in 2008
- Born: Reinhilde Goossens; 9 June 1961 (age 65); Mopertingen, Belgium
- Occupation: singer

Lisa del Bo (born Reinhilde Goossens on 9 June 1961 in Mopertingen, Belgium) is a Belgian singer who is popular in her own country and also in Germany. Lisa del Bo is a Flemish singer who often sings in the Dutch language but has been known to record songs in other languages as well.

She represented Belgium in the Eurovision Song Contest 1996 with the song "Liefde is een kaartspel", where she came 16th.

She recorded a duet with fellow Belgian Helmut Lotti.

== Singles ==
- 1991 "Maar nu, wat doe ik zonder jou" (Madame)
- 1992 "Liefde" (Lidia a Mosca)
- 1993 "Vlinder"
- 1993 "Ergens"
- 1994 "Leef nu met een lach"
- 1994 "Eindeloos"
- 1995 "Mijn hart is van slag"
- 1995 "Van alles"
- 1996 "Liefde is een kaartspel" (Love is a card game)
- 1996 "Morgen" (Tell him)
- 1996 "Roosje"
- 1997 "Alleen voor jou"
- 1998 "Eenzaam zonder jou" – with Bart Kaell
- 1998 "Met 16 kan je nog dromen" (At 16, one can still have dreams)
- 1998 "De drie klokken"
- 1999 "Zeldzaam gevoel"
- 2000 "Nooit op zondag"
- 2003 "Tussen Heist en de Ardennen" – with Willy Sommers and Luc Steeno
- 2004 "Jij" (Love will keep us together)

== See also ==
- Belgium in the Eurovision Song Contest 1996

Preceded by Frédéric Etherlinck with "La voix est libre"	Belgium in the Eurovision Song Contest; 1996	Succeeded by Melanie Cohl with "Dis oui"
