= Let's Kiss and Make Up =

Let's Kiss and Make Up may refer to:

- "Let's Kiss and Make Up", a song by George and Ira Gershwin introduced in Funny Face, 1927
- "Let's Kiss and Make Up", a 1962 song by Bobby Vinton
- "Let's Kiss and Make Up", a 1989 song by the Field Mice, better known as the 1990 cover "Kiss and Make Up" by Saint Etienne

== See also ==
- Kiss and Make Up (disambiguation)
