= Kiss and Make Up =

Kiss and Make Up or Kiss and Make-Up may refer to:

== Music ==
- "Kiss and Make Up" (Dua Lipa and Blackpink song), 2018
- "Kiss and Make Up" (Saint Etienne song), a 1990 cover of the 1989 Field Mice song "Let's Kiss and Make Up"
- "Kiss and Make Up", a song by LeVert from the album Bloodline, 1986
- "Kiss and Make Up", a 1974 song by William DeVaughn

== Other ==
- Kiss and Make-Up, a 1934 American romantic comedy film starring Cary Grant
- Kiss and Make-up, a book written by Gene Simmons

== See also ==
- Let's Kiss and Make Up (disambiguation)
