= The Constant (I Blame Coco album) =

Studio album by I Blame Coco
- Released: 1 October 2010
- Recorded: 2008–2010
- Genre: Synth-pop; new wave; indie rock
- Length: 45:30
- Label: Island
- Producer: Klas Åhlund; Nathan Boddy; Paddy Byrne; Dan Carey; Mike Crossey; Sam Dixon; Dan Foat; Andrew Frampton; Steve Kipner; Dave McCracken

I Blame Coco chronology
The Constant (2010)	Information (2016)

Singles from The Constant
- 1. "Caesar" Released: 31 January 2010; 2. "Selfmachine" Released: 11 July 2010; 3. "Quicker" Released: 13 September 2010; 4. "In Spirit Golden" Released: 31 October 2010

The Constant is the debut studio album by English band I Blame Coco, released on 1 October 2010 by Island Records. The album spawned four singles: "Caesar" (which features Swedish singer Robyn), "Selfmachine", "Quicker" and "In Spirit Golden"; the latter was released digitally on 31 October 2010, one week before the album's UK release date.

== Critical reception ==
Professional ratings
Aggregate scores
Source	Rating
Metacritic	63/100
Review scores
Source	Rating
AllMusic	3.5/5 stars
Clash	4/10
The Daily Telegraph	3/5 stars
Drowned in Sound	5/10
The Guardian	2/5 stars
MusicOMH	3/5 stars
NME	5/10
PopMatters	7/10
Virgin Media	3/5 stars
The Wharf	4/5

The Constant received generally positive reviews from music critics. At Metacritic, which assigns a normalised rating out of 100 to reviews from mainstream publications, the album received an average score of 63, based on 11 reviews. Joe Vogel of PopMatters praised the album as "a worthy and promising debut", dubbing it "a young album that avoids certain risks [...], but there is a vitality and ambition to it that is rare and refreshing for pop music." The Daily Telegraph's Lucy Jones referred to the album as "a well-crafted and impressive debut" and wrote, "Although the album doesn't quite ignite, Sumner's innate talent shines through." Heather Phares of AllMusic concluded that the album "has enough strong moments to make it a promising debut from a group with plenty of confidence, personality and potential." Ian Gittins of Virgin Media found that Sumner "has spectacularly inherited her father's idiosyncratic musicality, with her husky, masculine tones and mannered whoops and yowls illustrating that she has paid close attention to her dad's vocal repertoire."

Louisa Emery of The Wharf expressed that "Coco has created an album that shows she is more than a over privileged kid playing popstar, even if it will do little to shake off her Sumner stigma." Ben Weisz of MusicOMH noted that "The Constant isn't exceptional, but it does demonstrate a sophistication which sets her apart from the twee pop of some of her rivals." The Guardian's Caroline Sullivan viewed the album as "essentially a mildly promising debut by an artist who can write a tune but not yet with any great distinction." At NME, Alex Denney described "Caesar" as a "good-ass pop tune", but stated that "for the most part The Constant boils down to a thin chart gruel, too lumpenly pitched between the Carling Academies and the cattle-grid nightclubs to leave a mark." Neil Condron of Clash characterised the album as "[p]redictably pristine, ultimately inessential". The Observer's Killian Fox argued that "the album ends up feeling oddly flat. We are left with a sense of excitement unfulfilled."

== Track listing ==
No.	Title	Writer(s)	Producer(s)	Length
1.	"Selfmachine"	Coco Sumner; Klas Åhlund	Åhlund	3:49
2.	"In Spirit Golden"	Sumner; Steve Kipner; Andrew Frampton; Al Shuckburgh	Kipner; Frampton	3:28
3.	"Quicker"	Sumner	Dan Foat; Nathan Boddy	3:02
4.	"Turn Your Back on Love"	Sumner; Paddy Byrne; Sam Dixon	Dixon	3:23
5.	"Please Rewind"	Sumner; Åhlund	Åhlund	3:22
6.	"Summer Rain"	Sumner; Amanda Ghost; Ian Dench; Dave McCracken	McCracken	3:52
7.	"Playwrite Fate"	Sumner; Byrne	Byrne; Dixon	3:10
8.	"The Constant"	Sumner; Shuckburgh	Foat; Boddy	3:32
9.	"Party Bag"	Sumner; Kipner; Frampton; Shuckburgh	Kipner; Frampton	3:35
10.	"No Smile"	Sumner	Dan Carey; Mike Crossey	3:16
11.	"Caesar" (featuring Robyn)	Sumner; Åhlund	Åhlund	3:38
12.	"Only Love Can Break Your Heart"	Neil Young	Foat; Boddy	3:05
13.	"It's About to Get Worse"	Sumner; Åhlund	Åhlund	4:18

Austrian, French, German, Italian and Swiss iTunes Store bonus tracks
No.	Title	Writer(s)	Producer(s)	Length
14.	"Atlantis Found"	Sumner; Kipner; Frampton; Shuckburgh	Kipner; Frampton	3:51
15.	"Caesar" (music video)			3:45
16.	"Selfmachine" (music video)			3:39
17.	"Quicker" (music video)			3:19

International edition bonus track Dutch, Belgian, Swedish and UK iTunes Store bonus track
No.	Title	Length
14.	"Quicker" (Rack n Ruin Rework)	3:01

UK iTunes Store deluxe edition bonus tracks
No.	Title	Length
14.	"Quicker" (Rack n Ruin Rework)	3:01
15.	"Summer Rain" (acoustic)	4:21
16.	"Selfmachine" (acoustic)	3:16
17.	"The Chain" (acoustic)	3:43
18.	"Caesar" (music video)	3:45
19.	"Selfmachine" (music video)	3:39
20.	"Quicker" (Rack n Ruin Remix; music video)	4:00
21.	"In Spirit Golden" (music video)	3:28

HMV Digital bonus tracks
No.	Title	Length
14.	"Quicker" (Rack n Ruin Rework)	3:01
15.	"Kiddo" (HMV exclusive track)	3:58

== Charts ==
Chart (2010–2011)	Peak position
Austrian Albums (Ö3 Austria)	58
Belgian Albums (Ultratop Flanders)	82
Belgian Albums (Ultratop Wallonia)	88
French Albums (SNEP)	41
German Albums (Offizielle Top 100)	31
Polish Albums (ZPAV)	36
Scottish Albums (OCC)	97
Swiss Albums (Schweizer Hitparade)	72
UK Albums (OCC)	86

== Release history ==
Region	Date	Label	Ref.
Netherlands	1 October 2010	Universal	
Sweden	1 October 2010	Universal	
Switzerland	8 October 2010	Universal	
France	11 October 2010	Universal	
Poland	29 October 2010	Universal	
Germany	2 November 2010	Universal	
United Kingdom	8 November 2010	Island	
Italy	22 February 2011	Universal	
