= Selfmachine =

Single by I Blame Coco

from the album The Constant
- B-side: "Stunned"
- Released: 11 July 2010
- Recorded: 2009
- Genre: Synth-pop; indie rock; new wave
- Length: 3:49
- Label: Island
- Songwriters: Coco Sumner; Klas Åhlund
- Producer: Klas Åhlund

I Blame Coco singles chronology
"Splash" (2010)	"Selfmachine" (2010)	"Quicker" (2010)

"Selfmachine" is a song by the English band I Blame Coco from their first album, The Constant. Produced by Klas Åhlund, it was released as the album's second single in digital format on 11 July 2010, with a 12" vinyl released the following day. The single was remixed by La Roux and Sub Focus, and was added to BBC Radio 1's B List playlist on 9 June 2010. The track was used in the eighteenth episode of the fourth season of Gossip Girl, titled "The Kids Stay in the Picture", broadcast on 18 April 2011.

== Background ==
"Selfmachine" is a song about alienation. The lead singer, Coco Sumner, told The Independent that they relate to the loneliness of the robot described in the song, saying, "This little robot can't empathise with anything but himself, so he feels really sorry for himself. Then everyone leaves him because he is selfish, but he can't help it, because he is just a robot and programmed that way." In an interview with the Evening Standard, Sumner explained that the song is not about their own feelings so much as those of the title character in the 2008 Pixar movie WALL-E.

== Critical reception ==
Digital Spy's Nick Levine awarded the song four out of five stars, calling it "a percolating electropop ditty with intriguing lyrics about a 'lonely robot in a wasteland', a nice bit of SAW-style vocal trickery—yes, really!—and a chorus melody that flirts with brilliance." Ben Weisz of musicOMH referred to the song's "glorious synth-pop" as "ubiquitous", adding that "[t]he dystopian depth to the lyrics is rarely encountered in something so catchy and danceable." Alex Denney of the NME commented that the track "recreates The Killers' clubby output, right down to the twinkly smattering of keys".

== Commercial performance ==
Having been predicted to debut within the top forty by Digital Spy, "Selfmachine" entered on the UK Singles Chart at number 64 on 18 July 2010, spending a single week in the top 100. In Germany, the single peaked at number 56 and spent ten weeks on the chart.

== Music video ==
The music video for "Selfmachine", directed by Alex Smith, was premiered on YouTube on 7 June 2010. It shows Sumner and a group of teenagers performing, playing around in an empty, waterless swimming pool. Throughout the video, the teenagers are seen playing with a translucent sheet which is propelled into the air at various points. In the latter half of the video, Sumner is seen in slow motion releasing water from their hands.

== Track listing ==
- UK iTunes single
1. "Selfmachine" – 3:54
2. "Selfmachine" (Sub Focus remix) – 4:09
- UK iTunes remix EP
1. "Selfmachine" (La Roux remix) – 4:16
2. "Selfmachine" (Chew Fu remix) – 6:26
3. "Selfmachine" (Pangea remix) – 4:23
4. "Selfmachine" (Jakwob remix) – 5:03
- UK 12" single

A1. "Selfmachine" – 3:54
A2. "Selfmachine" (Sub Focus remix) – 4:09
B1. "Stunned" (Coco Sumner, Paddy Byrne, Sam Dixon) – 3:36
B2. "Selfmachine" (La Roux remix) – 4:16

== Charts ==
Chart (2010–11)	Peak position
Belgian Tip Chart (Flanders)	3
Belgian Tip Chart (Wallonia)	43
German Singles Chart	56
Italian Singles Chart	100
UK Singles Chart	64

== Release history ==
Region	Date	Label	Format
United Kingdom	11 July 2010	Island	Digital download
United Kingdom	12 July 2010	Island	12" single
