= Rock It / Follow the Light =

"Rock It"

Single by Sub Focus

from the album Sub Focus
- B-side: "Follow the Light"
- Released: 26 July 2009
- Genre: Drum and bass
- Length: 5:01 (single version); 2:52 (radio edit); 4:35 (album version)
- Label: RAM
- Songwriter: Nick Douwma
- Producer: Sub Focus

Sub Focus singles chronology
"Timewarp / Join the Dots" (2008)	"Rock It" (2009)	"Could This Be Real" (2010)

Music video
- "Rock It" on YouTube

"Rock It" is the second single from English drum and bass producer Sub Focus's self-titled debut album, released on 26 July 2009. It was Sub Focus' most successful solo single from the album, peaking at number 38 on the UK Singles Chart.

The B-side, "Follow the Light", was also included on Sub Focus's debut album. The song contains vocals from the drum and bass act TC, but the album version uses newer lyrics than the vocal single version. There are also additional vocals from Takura in the single version, but they are based on the same lyrics as the song "Coming Closer", the final track of Sub Focus's album (which actually features Takura).

Both songs on the EP were featured in the 2010 video game Gran Turismo 5.

== Track listing ==
Digital download – extended play
No.	Title	Length
1.	"Rock It"	5:01
2.	"Follow the Light"	6:23
3.	"Follow the Light" (vocal mix)	6:22
4.	"Rock It" (radio edit)	2:52
5.	"Follow the Light" (radio edit)	3:37

== Chart performance ==
Chart (2009)	Peak position
UK Singles (Official Charts)	38
UK Dance (Official Charts)	1

== Certifications ==
Certifications for "Rock It"
Region	Certification	Certified units/sales
New Zealand (RMNZ)	Gold	15,000^{‡}
^{‡} Sales+streaming figures based on certification alone.
