= Could This Be Real =

Single by Sub Focus

from the album Sub Focus
- B-side: "Triple X"
- Released: 18 January 2010
- Recorded: 2009
- Genre: Electro house; breakbeat; dubstep
- Length: 3:35
- Label: RAM
- Songwriters: Nick Douwma; Linden Reeves
- Producer: Sub Focus

Sub Focus singles chronology
| "Rock It / Follow the Light" (2009) | "Could This Be Real" (2010) | "Splash" (2010) |

Music video
- "Could This Be Real" on YouTube

"Could This Be Real" is the third single from drum and bass artist Sub Focus released from the self-titled debut album Sub Focus. The song features writing and uncredited vocals from Linden Reeves (also known as Stamina MC). It is an electro house and breakbeat song and one of the few non-drum and bass tracks from the album. The single managed to reach number 41 on the UK Singles Chart and number four on the UK Dance Chart.

== Music video ==
A music video to accompany the release of "Could This Be Real" was first released onto YouTube on 25 December 2009 at a total length of two minutes and forty-two seconds.

== Track listing ==
Digital download
| No. | Title | Length |
|---|---|---|
| 1. | "Could This Be Real" | 3:35 |
| 2. | "Could This Be Real" (radio edit) | 2:41 |
| 3. | "Could This Be Real" (extended mix) | 4:26 |
| 4. | "Triple X" (12" version) | 5:09 |
| 5. | "Could This Be Real" (Sub Focus drum and bass mix) | 4:26 |
| 6. | "Could This Be Real" (Joker remix) | 4:13 |

== Chart performance ==
| Chart (2010) | Peak position |
|---|---|
| UK Singles (Official Charts Company) | 41 |
| UK Dance (Official Charts) | 4 |

== Release history ==
| Region | Date | Format |
|---|---|---|
| United Kingdom | 18 January 2010 | Digital download |
