= Join Our Club =

Single by Saint Etienne

from the album So Tough
- A-side: "People Get Real"
- B-side: "Scene 93"
- Released: May 1992
- Genre: House; dance pop
- Length: 3:17
- Label: Heavenly Records - HVN15
- Songwriter(s): Stanley/Wiggs

Saint Etienne singles chronology
"Nothing Can Stop Us" (1991)	"Join Our Club" (1992)	"Avenue" (1992)

"Join Our Club" is a song by English musical group Saint Etienne, released by Heavenly Records in May 1992 as a double-A side with "People Get Real".

Saint Etienne wrote the song after the label refused to release "People Get Real" as a single. The band deliberately tried to write the most commercial song they could, and it ultimately reached number 21 in the UK Top 40. The lyric alludes to a number of other songs, some recent hits at the time it was written (e.g. "Smells Like Teen Spirit", “Justified and Ancient,” “We Got a Love Thang”), others older favourites of the group (including Stevie Wonder's "Don't You Worry 'bout a Thing" - coincidentally, a hit cover version for Incognito the following month - and The Lovin' Spoonful's "Do You Believe in Magic", which like "Join Our Club" itself is a celebration of the pleasure of listening to music, and whose title is used as a recurring hook).

In the UK, it was a between-album single, released between Foxbase Alpha and So Tough. "Join Our Club" appeared on the US version of So Tough (the announcer’s intro mention the “Chicken Soup Mix” with a chuckle), while "People Get Real" appeared on the US release of Foxbase Alpha. Both later were included on You Need a Mess of Help to Stand Alone, a b-side collection in the UK.

In 2001, "Join Our Club" was remixed for its inclusion on Smash The System: Singles and More as the original sounded too 'muddy'. This version also appears on the 2005 version of the same album and London Conversations.

== Critical reception ==
Tim Sendra from AllMusic described the original mix of "Join Our Club" as "a soaring, joyous disco track that is musically and lyrically wide open." He also said that the Chemically Friendly Zoom Mix "tethers the exuberance to a rock-hard beat and throws in some sped-up heavy metal guitar riffs, salacious talk-overs from Sarah Cracknell, and some chopped-up diva vocals." Jim Arundel from Melody Maker felt the song "is a damn sight swingier than their previous compositions." NME ranked "Join Our Club" number 45 in their list of "Singles of the Year" in December 1992. Mark Frith from Smash Hits gave it five out of five and named it Best New Single, commenting, "Hang on a sec. Check outside the window. Is it summer yet? If it is, grab your swimming cossie, crack open the Lucozade, organise a beach party, get some peanuts in, crack open another Lucozade, jig about a bit and listen to this 14 times. Cool, lush and a thing of great beauty. Readers, love these people."

== Track listing ==
All tracks are written by Stanley and Wiggs.

7": Heavenly / HVN 15 and MC (HVN15CS)
No.	Title	Length
1.	"Join Our Club"	3:20
2.	"People Get Real"	4:45

12": Heavenly / HVN 15 12 and CD (HVN15CD)
No.	Title	Length
1.	"Join Our Club"	3:20
2.	"Join Our Club (Chemically Friendly Zoom Mix)"	6:46
3.	"People Get Real"	4:45
4.	"Scene 93"	3:59

12": Heavenly / HVN 15 12P (12" Promo)
No.	Title	Length
1.	"Join Our Club"	3:20
2.	"Join Our Club (Chemically Friendly Zoom Mix)"	6:46
3.	"Join Our Club (Monty's Stripped Down Dub)"

== Charts ==
Chart (1992)	Peak position
Europe (Eurochart Hot 100)	84
UK Singles (OCC)	21
UK Dance (Music Week)	10
UK Club Chart (Music Week)	48
