= Where Am I Going? =

Studio album by Dusty Springfield
- Released: 27 October 1967
- Recorded: July–August 1967 (Track A4: November 1965)
- Studio: Philips (London)
- Genre: Pop
- Length: 31:20
- Labels: Philips; BL 7820 (mono); SBL 7820 (stereo)
- Producers: Johnny Franz; Dusty Springfield (Track A5)

Dusty Springfield chronology
Ev'rything's Coming Up Dusty (1965)	Where Am I Going? (1967)	Dusty... Definitely (1968)

Professional ratings
Review scores
Source	Rating
Allmusic	4/5 stars

Where Am I Going? is the third studio album by singer Dusty Springfield, released on Philips Records in the UK in 1967. By now, firmly established as one of the most popular singers in Britain, with several hits in America as well, Springfield ventured into more varied styles than before and recorded a wide variety of material for this album. Rather than the straightforward pop of A Girl Called Dusty or the mix of pop and soul of Ev'rything's Coming Up Dusty, Springfield recorded a variety of styles from jazz to soul, to pop and even show tunes (the standout title track, from the musical Sweet Charity). While not the success that her previous two albums were, Where Am I Going? was praised by fans and critics alike for showing a mature and sophisticated sensibility, despite the many different styles of music.

At the time of the release, Dusty was touring in Australia and making some cabaret appearances in the US. Therefore, the album didn't get much promotion in the UK. Consequently, it only peaked at No.40 on the UK albums chart and lasted 1 week on the chart.

In the United States, the album was released in a quite altered form as The Look of Love, titled after a successful Springfield recording originally only released as a single B-side in Britain. Also included were two other singles — "Give Me Time," a U.K. and United States hit, and "What's It Gonna Be," a United States hit — not included on Where Am I Going?. The Look of Love also contained the UK single B-side "Small Town Girl," not on Where Am I Going?.

Where Am I Going? was first released on CD in the early 1990s. A digitally remastered edition was released in 1998, and included the bonus tracks "I've Got a Good Thing," "Don't Forget About Me" (a later version appeared on Dusty in Memphis), and "Time After Time."

"Where Am I Going?" was sampled in the song "Zenophile," from the 2004 album Destroy Rock & Roll, by Scottish electronic music artist Mylo. "I Can't Wait Until I See My Baby's Face" was sampled in the song "Nothing Can Stop Us" from the 1991 album Foxbase Alpha by Saint Etienne.

== Track listing ==
Side A

1. "Bring Him Back" (Mort Shuman, Doc Pomus) - 2:16
2. "Don't Let Me Lose This Dream" (Aretha Franklin, Ted White) - 2:27
3. "I Can't Wait Until I See My Baby's Face" (Jerry Ragovoy, Chip Taylor) - 2:41
4. "Take Me for a Little While" (Trade Martin) - 2:24
5. "Chained to a Memory" (Kay Rogers, Richard Ahlert) - 2:38
6. "Sunny" (Bobby Hebb) - 1:55

Side B

1. "(They Long to Be) Close to You" (Burt Bacharach, Hal David) - 2:28
2. "Welcome Home" (Chip Taylor) - 2:41
3. "Come Back to Me" (Alan Jay Lerner, Burton Lane) - 2:06
4. "If You Go Away (Ne Me Quitte Pas)" (Jacques Brel, Rod McKuen) - 3:53
5. "Broken Blossoms" (Traditional, Tom Springfield, Robert Gray) - 2:43
6. "Where Am I Going?" (Dorothy Fields, Cy Coleman) - 3:42

Bonus tracks 1998 CD re-issue

13. "I've Got a Good Thing" (Jerry Ragovoy, Mort Shuman) - 2:53
  - Outtake from the Where Am I Going? sessions. First release: UK compilation Something Special, 1996.
14. "Don't Forget About Me" (London recording) (Gerry Goffin, Carole King) - 2:50
  - Outtake from the Where Am I Going? sessions. First release: UK compilation Something Special, 1996. Springfield would record a substantially rearranged version of this song for her 1969 album Dusty in Memphis.
15. "Time After Time" (Jule Styne, Sammy Cahn) - 2:32
  - Outtake from the Where Am I Going? sessions. First release: UK 4-CD box set The Legend of Dusty Springfield, 1994.
- Track 13: Originally recorded in New York in 1965, producer: Jerry Ragovoy. Additional overdubs / re-recording, London 1967, producer: Johnny Franz.
- Track 14: Re-recorded in 1968 for album Dusty in Memphis.
- Tracks 14–15: Producer: Johnny Franz.

== Personnel and production ==
- Dusty Springfield - lead vocals, backing vocals
- Lesley Duncan - backing vocals
- Madeline Bell - backing vocals
- The Echoes - accompaniment
- Alan Tew - accompaniment & orchestra director
- Arthur Greenslade - accompaniment & orchestra director
- Ivor Raymonde - accompaniment direction
- Wally Stott - accompaniment & orchestra director
- Peter Knight - accompaniment & orchestra director
- Reg Guest - accompaniment & orchestra director
- Pat Williams - musical arranger
- Jim Tyler - musical arranger
- Johnnie Spence - musical arranger
- Johnny Franz - record producer
- Roger Wake - digital remastering/remix (1998 re-issue)
- Mike Gill - digital remastering/remix (1998 re-issue)
