= Avenue (song) =

1992 single by Saint Etienne

Single by Saint Etienne

from the album So Tough
- B-side: "Paper"; "Some Place Else"; "Johnny in the Echo Café"
- Released: 5 October 1992
- Genre: Electronica
- Length: 7:37 (12-inch single)
- Label: Heavenly
- Songwriter(s): Bob Stanley; Pete Wiggs; Sarah Cracknell; Ian Catt
- Producer(s): Saint Etienne

Saint Etienne singles chronology
"Only Love Can Break Your Heart (reissue)" (1991)	"Avenue" (1992)	"You're in a Bad Way" (1993)

Music video
- "Avenue" on YouTube

"Avenue" is a song by British pop group Saint Etienne, released in October 1992 by Heavenly Records as the first single from their second album, So Tough (1992). It was originally titled "Lovely Heart" or "Young Heart". The album version is a 7-minute version with lengthy instrumental sequences; it was edited down to around 4 minutes for radio play, though the commercial single contained the full-length version, with the radio edit only released on promotional material. The edit wasn't released commercially until 2005's Travel Edition 1990-2005.

The song describes a woman nostalgically remembering a love affair from her youth, mostly through impressionistic and surreal imagery, with the refrain: "oh, how many years / is it now Maurice?". The chorus repeats the words "Young heart". The song is recorded with echo effects that make it sound as though it is being performed in a large hall.

The birdsong on the track is sampled from the Pink Floyd track "Cirrus Minor" from the 1969 album More. "Paper" features guitarist Maurice Deebank of the band Felt. "Johnny In The Echo Café" is based on a sample from Forest's song "Bluebell Dance", from their album Full Circle.

The accompanying music video for the single release depicts the band driving to Brighton.

A remix single was also released, with two remixes each by Gordon King (from World of Twist) and Rudy Tambala of A.R. Kane. King's "Variety Club Mix" was later included on the remix collection Casino Classics.

== Critical reception ==
Upon the release, David Stubbs from Melody Maker wrote, "'Avenue' is a return to their Kentish Town Avalon after the techno aberration that was 'Join Our Club'. Sarah Cracknell's flat, tupperware vowels are almost Cocteauesque — imagine hearing an old Dusty Springfield record in a dream, through the silvery haze of recollection, in slow motion, soft focus, idealised by the process of memory." He concluded, "If old pop records go to Heaven, this is what they sound like up there." Stephen Dalton from NME praised the song, saying, "Actually, the dream-pop trio have whisked up another corker, all gliding keyboards and swoooping vocals with a stately tempo and PROPER POP SONG written all the way through. Yummo."

Armond White from Rolling Stone named it one of the "high points" of the album, "an elegiac report on an English day that folds and unfolds in choruses of onomatopoeia. Cracknell's bah-da-da-da-da-da-das are split up by a thunder crack, then a harpsichord interlude. The eclectic sense of rhythm that has revitalized British pop through raves, techno and other aural experiments allows Wiggs and Stanley to make 'Avenue' one of the most breathtaking set pieces since Roxy Music's 'Amazona'." Peter Stanton from Smash Hits declared the song, along with "You're in a Bad Way", as "classic pop beauties". Jonathan Bernstein from Spin named it a "time-capsule classic".

== Retrospective response ==
Tim Sendra from AllMusic felt "Avenue" is "one of the best the group ever released", describing it as an "epic ballad built around a pastoral melody, a genius arrangement, and a lovely vocal by Sarah Cracknell." Melody Maker ranked "Avenue" number 11 in their list of "Singles of the Year" in December 1992, writing, "Symphonic, idyllic, nostalgic for a semi-imaginary golden age. Bob'n'Pete played Smile-era Beach Boys, Sarah "ba-da-ba-da-ba-da"-ed like some angelic Sixties startlet a la Francaise. In the real charts, 'Avenue' hit 30-something with an anchor, but it was the Number One Song in Heaven." NME ranked it number 13 in their list of "Singles of the Year". Jim Wirth from NME called it "lush", noting "the wide-eyed love" that goes into producing the song.

== Track listings ==
All tracks were written by Ian Catt, Sarah Cracknell, Bob Stanley and Pete Wiggs except where indicated.

- 12-inch – Heavenly / HVN 23-12 (UK), CD (HVN 23CD) and cassette (HVN 23CS)
1. "Avenue" - 7:35
2. "Some Place Else" (Stanley, Wiggs) – 3:46
3. "Paper" (Cracknell, Maurice Deebank) – 4:10
4. "Johnny in the Echo Café" (Stanley, Wiggs) – 3:59
- 12-inch – Heavenly / HVN 23-12R (UK) and CD (HVN 23CDR)
1. "Avenue" (Variety club mix) – 6:21
2. "Avenue" (Butlins mix) – 5:57
3. "Avenue" (Martial mix) – 6:27
4. "Avenue" (Venusian mix) – 5:19
- 7-inch – Heavenly/Universal / HVN 23 (Part of box set Saint Etienne on 45, Part One) (2011)
1. "Avenue" (radio edit) – 3:47
2. "Stranger in Paradise" (Alexander Borodin, Robert Wright, George Forrest) – 3:30

== Charts ==
Chart (1992)	Peak position
UK Singles (OCC)	40
UK Dance (Music Week)	27
UK Club Chart (Music Week)	91
