= Sub Focus (album) =

Studio album by Sub Focus
- Released: 12 October 2009
- Recorded: 2008–2009
- Genre: Drum and bass; electronic; dubstep; house
- Length: 55:46
- Label: RAM
- Producer: Sub Focus; Culture Shock

Sub Focus chronology
Sub Focus (2009)	Torus (2013)

Singles from Sub Focus
- 1. "Timewarp / Join the Dots" Released: 16 June 2008; 2. "Rock It / Follow the Light" Released: 27 July 2009; 3. "Could This Be Real" Released: 18 January 2010; 4. "Splash" Released: 10 May 2010

Sub Focus is the debut album by British drum and bass producer Sub Focus. It was released on 12 October 2009 through RAM Records. The album primarily features drum and bass tracks, however there are tracks showcasing dubstep, electro, house, breakbeat and trance music elements. "Rock It / Follow the Light" managed to break into the top 40 of the UK Singles Chart. Two later singles, "Could This Be Real" and "Splash", both fell just below, peaking at number 41. The album charted at number 51 on the UK Albums Chart.

== Critical reception ==
Chris Power of the BBC said that Sub Focus "has the ability to create dancefloor-consuming monsters....but while it's possible to admire his sound's power there are times when it's not matched by songcraft....What remains to be seen is whether he can convert his jackdaw versatility – house, breaks and dubstep all get a look-in here – into a coherent style of his own. Right now that's very much a work in progress."

== Track listing ==
All tracks are written by Nick Douwma

No.	Title	Length
1.	"Let the Story Begin"	4:52
2.	"World of Hurt"	4:25
3.	"Follow the Light"	5:34
4.	"Last Jungle"	3:39
5.	"Deep Space"	4:37
6.	"Rock It"	4:35
7.	"Move Higher" (featuring Culture Shock)	4:12
8.	"Vapourise"	4:05
9.	"Splash"	4:02
10.	"Could This Be Real"	3:35
11.	"Triple X"	3:58
12.	"Timewarp"	4:37
13.	"Coming Closer" (featuring Takura)	3:35

Notes

- "World of Hurt" features uncredited vocals by Takura
- "Follow the Light" features uncredited vocals by TC
- "Could This Be Real" features uncredited vocals by Stamina MC

Sample credits

- "Let the Story Begin" features an excerpt from the track "Spiral" by Vangelis
- "World of Hurt" contains elements of "Worla Hurt" by Bugz in the Attic
- "Last Jungle" contains elements of "Neither One of Us (Wants to Be the First to Say Goodbye)" by Gladys Knight & the Pips
- "Timewarp" contains a sample from Star Trek IV: The Voyage Home (1986)

Alternate versions

- An extended version of "Timewarp" is available on the Timewarp / Join the Dots single.
- Alternate versions of "Rock It" and "Follow the Light" are available on the Rock It / Follow the Light single.
- Two remixes of "Could This Be Real", one by dubstep musician Joker and a drum and bass remix by Sub Focus himself, can be found on the Could This Be Real (remixes) EP.
- The single version of "Splash" is different from the album version: it features vocals from Coco Sumner.
- An extended mix of the instrumental version of "Splash" and a VIP mix of "Timewarp" can be found alongside the Splash EP and on the 12" vinyl single Splash (extended mix) / Timewarp VIP.
- Dubstep musician Rusko produced a remix of "Splash", available on the Splash EP and the 12" vinyl single Splash (Rusko remix) / Coming Closer VIP on release in 2010. As the release title suggests, a VIP mix of "Coming Closer" also features.

== Charts ==
Chart (2009)	Peak position
UK Albums (OCC)	51
UK Dance Albums (OCC)	2

== In popular culture ==
"Follow the Light", "Deep Space" and "Rock It" were all featured on the video game Gran Turismo 5.
