= Love City Groove =

British band

- Origin: London, England
- Genres: Pop, R&B, hip hop
- Years active: 1994–96
- Labels: Sony Music; Planet 3
- Past members: Paul Hardy; Stephen "Beanz" Rudden; Jay Williams; Yinka Charles (aka MC Reason)

Love City Groove were a musical group who represented the United Kingdom in the Eurovision Song Contest 1995, with their self-titled song after being the winner in a public vote. The song finished tenth with 76 points; and peaked at No. 7 on the UK Singles Chart.

== The band ==
=== Beginnings ===
Love City Groove were formed by the producer and songwriter Stephen "Beanz" Rudden, who at the time was a staff writer at Warner Chappell Music. Rudden had worked with fellow Warner Chappell writer Tatiana Mais, also known as "Q-Tee", producing one of her songs, and requested that she rap over a song he had written, called "Sentence of Love". Q-Tee, believing that a male rapper was also needed, arrived at the studio with Jay Williams, a student at the BRIT School for Performing Arts & Technology. Record producer Dave Ambrose (who signed acts including Duran Duran and Pet Shop Boys) had asked Rudden to write a "summer anthem" for 1994. Rudden had put the rappers' two songs together with a third, and Paul Hardy came up with the chorus, "In the morning, when the sun shines". According to Hardy, regarding choosing a name for the song, "The song was about love, it was an urban track, so 'city', and I said 'groove'; this then gave us the name 'Love city groove'." In February 1994, Rudden took the rap parts and mixed them in with the new chorus track sung by Hardy. He presented the song to Ambrose at Planet 3 Records, and it was scheduled for release later that year.

=== Eurovision 1995 ===
However, Jonathan King, then working for BBC Television, tasked with finding and producing an entry for Eurovision, requested that the song be submitted for the "A Song for Europe" contest in 1995.

The final line-up of Love City Groove consisted of Stephen Rudden, rappers Jay Williams and Yinka Charles (a.k.a. "Reason"), and Paul Hardy. The selectors were looking for something a little different from past British Eurovision entries, that better represented what was popular in the charts. The band members were all from different backgrounds, and multi-racial. Hardy's father was from Cyprus, Williams is of Hispanic background, and Reason (Yinka Charles) is Trinidad/Irish.

Their Eurovision entry, chosen by public vote, was named "Love City Groove", and written by Rudden, Hardy, Williams, and Tatiana Mais (aka Q-Tee). (Note: Sometimes incorrectly attributed as "Tatsiana".) The song was a combination of laid-back soulful background instrumentals overlaid with rap vocals by Williams and the only female band member, Reason, and backed by a full orchestra. It was a contrast from the previous UK entries to the competition, which had all been ballads and pop tunes. Hardy felt that the orchestra ruined the song, not being the right kind of backing for it.

The song was enthusiastically embraced by the tabloids, although less so by papers such as The Independent, which criticised the lyrics and, according to Hardy brought them in for "an interview under the guise of a questionnaire and the questions were designed to make us look stupid".

At Eurovision, held in Ireland that year, the song received a mixed reception from the juries, finishing tenth with 76 points. However it was popular at home and peaked at No. 7 on the UK Singles Chart, selling over 200,000 copies.

=== After Eurovision ===
However the band failed to achieve further success. The follow-up "Soft Spot" missed out on the UK Singles Chart. This was followed by "J.u.m.p." which likewise did not enter the official UK listing. Their debut album Hard Times received a limited release, and sold in small quantities. The group then split from their record label, Planet 3.

The band returned a year later with a cover of the track "I Found Lovin'". With several line-up changes, but not much success, the group finally split up for good.

== Solo careers ==
=== Stephen Rudden ===
In the mid-1980s, Rudden worked with various local groups, such as Smell Funky Beast and behind the scenes programming work with British synth-pop dance band Kissing the Pink and then solo instrumental project Plutonic, releasing Mike Oldfield's "Tubular Bells" (CBS Records 1989). This landed him a contract at CBS Records in London and a publishing deal with Warner/Chappell Music. He then turned Plutonic into the first of many group projects he would helm with "Twilight Zone" (Sony – 1991) and, in 1992, an album for Arista Records, including the singles "One Life" (mixes by Frankie Knuckles and Mike "Hitman" Wilson) and "Sentence of Love" (with a remix by Eric Kuppa).

After Love City Groove, Rudden established a new band, The Collective, who were signed to Simon Cowell's record label. They entered a song for the 1998 Eurovision pre-selection in 1998, but did not get selected to proceed. He wrote a song for Shirley Kwan, called "About Me", which reached no. 1 in southeast Asia and held the position for six weeks. He also wrote music (the title theme, "Get Crafty") for the film The Real Howard Spitz, starring Kelsey Grammer, and for Disney's game Astro Knights.

In 2007, Rudden released his follow up instrumental album, Blog on iTunes.

In 2011, Rudden considered re-releasing "Love City Groove", and reconnected with Paul Hardy. They recorded the new single, but in this version, the rap verses were replaced and sung by Moxiie. It was released in August 2011 on the record label Strawberry Hill. A music video for the track was shot in Trafalgar Square in London.

=== Yinka Charles ===
Yinka Inniss Charles aka MC Reason (born 1970) is the daughter of one of the black activists known as the Mangrove Nine, Elton Anthony Carlisle Inniss, who moved from Trinidad to the UK as a teenager, and an Irish mother from Cork. Yinka aka Reason grew up in Notting Hill. Her first name is a Nigerian one, inspired by the African culture embraced by [Her Dad Elton Inniss aka Chad], Her parents eventually separated, her father returning to Trinidad, never to return. Her father was a musician, which inspired Yinka to become one too. She visited him a few times in Trinidad before his death in 2010.

She started rapping in old-school hip hop style when she was 15 and enjoyed great success, performing in concerts and on music channels and programmes around the world, including YO MTV and Top of the Pops. She has performed with many well-established artists, and had a top 10 hit in the UK Charts, and two albums in Japan with Love City Groove. was signed to Planet 3 and also Signed to JVC in Japan. Yinka aka Reason toured with the likes of Mark Morrison, Boys Zone, Peter Andre, All saints, Peter Andre, China Black and UK tours, Radio 1 and Pepsi, Capital Radio. She appeared on many popular TV shows. In 1988 Yinka was part of a duo Rhyme & Reason had a top 20 hit "Acid Rapping".

Yinka also took an interest in the theatre and acted in a play by Biyi Bandele "way past cool" and worked with Rigg O'Hara post office theatre in Nottinghill.

In 1988, she featured as MC Reason on a track called "Money" on a hip hop music hip hop compilation album called Various – Hard Core 1. Produced by Mc Dexter and Sparky, artists featured such as Mc Mello, DJ Q-Tip, Colt 45, D2K. In 1990, she released the hip-hop single A side "House quake" AA Symbolise, produced by Chapter n Verse on Positive Beat Label...credited as "The Voice of Reason a.k.a. MC Reason". In 1991 released single flight X produced by Paul Haig and remixed by Mantronix. In 93 she had two tracks "Come Correct" and Part time Lover" on an album Rhythm Within produced by Jazz Black toured with the likes of Mc Lyte, Poor Righteous Teachers, DA Youngsters and Roots. Serenade and montage, Zapp, Black Moon, South Central Cartel. Noel Mckoy. In 2013, she collaborated with hip hop artists Jonie D (a.k.a. Jonie Centro, Johny D) and Mista Stixx (a.k.a. DJ Stixx) as Awol Collaboration, releasing the track "Tings Affi Run" on CD. In 2015, Also in 2015, she released "I Get Up When I Fall" Yinka aka Reason featuring Joni D on YouTube.

She has also participated in an African version of the TV show Loose Women and was still involved in the music industry in 2020. In October 2021, she appeared as a panelist at the Manchester Hip Hop Archive Symposium.

She has done a degree in law, and has become somewhat of an activist, fighting against injustice. She was one of the first to be involved in the local campaign to help victims of the Grenfell fire, establishing a support group with and for Grenfell mothers, called We Can Cry. In 2020, she helped to organise a protest called Justice for El, in support of the family of a young black barman who was attacked in a pub in Portobello Road by a group of white men.

As of 2021, she has been living in south London with her children. She is still performing live as Yinka aka Reason.

=== Paul Hardy ===
Paul Hardy returned to his previous profession, illustrating comic books, and worked for companies such as Marvel Comics in a variety of styles for ten years. However he missed singing and performing, so moved to the coast and started producing, directing, and performing in theatre shows. He appeared as "Paul Phoenix" in series 5 of The Voice UK in 2016.

=== Jay Williams ===
Jay Williams started a new career, and, according to Hardy, never told his colleagues about Eurovision.

== Discography ==
=== Albums ===
List of albums, with selected details
Title	Details
Hard Times	Released: 1995; Label: Victor; Format: CD
Killing the Pressure	Released: 1997; Label: Victor; Format: CD

=== Singles ===
List of singles, with selected chart positions
Title	Year	Chart positions	Album
Title	Year	UK	Album
"Love City Groove"	1995	7	Hard Times
"Soft Spot"	1995	—	Hard Times
"J.U.M.P."	1995	—	Hard Times
"I Found Lovin'"	1996	—	Killing the Pressure

== Footnotes ==
Preceded by Frances Ruffelle with "Lonely Symphony (We Will Be Free)"	UK in the Eurovision Song Contest; 1995	Succeeded by Gina G with "Ooh Aah... Just a Little Bit"
