= So Tough =

Studio album by Saint Etienne
- Released: 22 February 1993
- Studios: RMS, London
- Genres: Indie pop; techno; synth-pop; alternative dance
- Length: 48:29 (UK version); 55:40 (US version)
- Labels: Heavenly (UK) – HVNLP 6 Warner Bros. (US) – 9 45166
- Producer: Saint Etienne

Saint Etienne chronology
Foxbase Alpha (1991)	So Tough (1993)	You Need a Mess of Help to Stand Alone (1993)

Singles from So Tough
- 1. "Avenue" Released: October 1992; 2. "You're in a Bad Way" Released: February 1993; 3. "Hobart Paving" Released: May 1993

Professional ratings
Review scores
Source	Rating
AllMusic	4.5/5 stars
Christgau's Consumer Guide	A−
NME	6/10
Pitchfork	8.9/10
Q	4/5 stars
Record Collector	4/5 stars
Rolling Stone	4/5 stars
The Rolling Stone Album Guide	4/5 stars
Select	4/5
Vox	8/10

So Tough is the second studio album by British band Saint Etienne, released in 1993. It is their highest-charting album to date, reaching No. 7 on the UK Albums Chart.

So Tough is the first Saint Etienne album to feature Sarah Cracknell as an official member of the band. It was originally intended as a concept album which starts at "Mario's Cafe" in London then travels around the world, but it ultimately came to be viewed as a solely London album.

== Samples and references ==
One of the distinctive features of the album is the use of samples between the songs. The band were keen to use linking dialogue, similar to that used on some of their favourite albums – particularly The Who Sell Out by the Who and Head by the Monkees – as well as contemporary hip-hop albums that featured recurring skits. They are taken from a variety of sources, including the films Peeping Tom, Billy Liar, The Picture of Dorian Gray, Lord of the Flies and That'll Be the Day, as well as the television series The Family and the 1958 stereo demonstration album A Journey into Stereophonic Sound. The band had intended to use a number of samples from American films, but the cost of clearing these samples led them to using primarily British samples.

So Tough takes its title from the Beach Boys album Carl and the Passions – "So Tough". "Conchita Martinez" is named after the Grand Slam-winning Spanish tennis player Conchita Martínez, who later went on to win the Wimbledon singles title. The song "Mario's Cafe" was inspired by a real Kentish Town restaurant of that name.

== Cover ==
The album cover features a picture of lead singer Sarah Cracknell aged six, taken by her father Derek Cracknell.

== Releases ==
The initial album release was a limited edition 2-CD set including You Need a Mess of Help to Stand Alone.

The US release added "Join Our Club" (3:22), which had been a UK single in 1992. "Who Do You Think You Are" (3:49) is included on some US versions between "Here Come Clown Feet" and "Junk the Morgue". "You're in a Bad Way" (3:08) and "Hobart Paving" (4:57) are presented in their single versions, including extra instrumentation. The former is longer, while the latter features a drum pattern not present on the original version.

The album was reissued on 31 August 2009, as part of the ongoing Deluxe Editions of the band's recordings. The new release features B-sides, rare and unreleased tracks.

== Track listing ==
=== 1993 release ===
All tracks are written by Bob Stanley and Pete Wiggs, except where indicated.

UK CD edition (Heavenly / HVNLP6CD)
No.	Title	Writer(s)	Length
1.	"Mario's Cafe"		4:38
2.	"Railway Jam"		4:14
3.	"Date with Spelman"		0:18
4.	"Calico"	Stanley; Wiggs; Tatiana Mais	5:12
5.	"Avenue"	Ian Catt; Sarah Cracknell; Stanley; Wiggs	7:40
6.	"You're in a Bad Way" (substituted for the single version (3:07) on US and Japanese editions)	Cracknell; Stanley; Wiggs	2:43
7.	"Memo to Pricey"		0:23
8.	"Hobart Paving" (substituted for the single version (4:57) on US and Japanese editions)		5:03
9.	"Leafhound"		4:05
10.	"Clock Milk"		0:14
11.	"Conchita Martinez"	Stanley, Wiggs, Geddy Lee, Alex Lifeson, Neil Peart	4:02
12.	"No Rainbows for Me"		3:56
13.	"Here Come Clown Feet"		0:22
14.	"Junk the Morgue"		5:12
15.	"Chicken Soup"		0:33

Bonus track on US edition (Warner Bros. / 9 45166-2)
No.	Title	Length
16.	"Join Our Club"	3:22

Bonus tracks on Japanese edition (Warner Bros. / WPCP-5209)
No.	Title	Length
16.	"Join Our Club"	3:22
17.	"Archway People"	3:17

=== 2009 reissue ===
UK CD edition (Heavenly / HVNLP6CDDE) – Disc two
No.	Title	Writer(s)	Length
1.	"Everything Flows"	Norman Blake	4:44
2.	"Railway Jam" (Vocal Version)		6:20
3.	"Who Do You Think You Are"	Des Dyer; Clive Scott	3:53
4.	"Some Place Else"		3:44
5.	"Duke Duvet"		3:12
6.	"Paper"	Cracknell; Maurice Deebank	4:11
7.	"Johnny in the Echo Cafe"		4:01
8.	"Archway People"		3:21
9.	"California Snow Story"		4:21
10.	"Join Our Club"		3:18
11.	"Everlasting"		4:33
12.	"Snowplough"		3:43
13.	"Rainy Day Women"	Bob Dylan	3:57
14.	"Peterloo"		4:29
15.	"I'm Too Sexy"	Fred Fairbrass; Richard Fairbrass; Rob Manzoli	5:10
16.	"Stranger in Paradise"	Robert Wright; George Forrest	3:29
17.	"Hobart Paving" (Van Dyke Parks Version)		4:50

Sample credits

- "Conchita Martinez" contains samples of "The Spirit of Radio" by Rush, sampled under licence from PolyGram Special.

== Personnel ==
The liner notes list the album's personnel as follows:

- Bob Stanley – Prophet 5, Roland Jupiter, handclaps, "Spriguns of Tolgus"
- Pete Wiggs – Rogue Moog, Emax sampler, basso profundo, "polk salad"
- Sarah Cracknell – vocals, "Sri Lanka", "Macca keyring"
- Ian Catt – guitar, keyboard programming, "whistling jack"
- Q-Tee – vocals (on "Calico")
- Cajun Queen – bass guitar (on "Calico")
- Ranald MacDonald – "fluted face"
- Gerald M. Jaffe – voice of man in café ("food on my table"), management
- Simon Price – voice of man at bar
- Paul Kelly – photography (beach photo)
- Celina Nash – voice of waitress
- Jeff Barrett – labelhead and press
- Alan McGee – management
- Martin Kelly – management
- James Hy – photography
- Mdesign – sleeve design
- Michael Gillette – painting ("painter man")
- Andrew Wickham – "the kissing kind"
- Kate Askey – "fifth tattoo"
- Kevin Pearce – liner notes
- Saint Etienne – production
- Ian Catt – engineering (at RMS, London)

== Charts ==
Chart performance for So Tough
Chart (1993)	Peak position
European Albums (Music & Media)	25
UK Albums (Official Charts)	7
UK Independent Albums (OCC)	1

== B-sides ==
from "Avenue"

- "Some Place Else"
- "Paper"
- "Johnny in the Echo Cafe"
- "Avenue (Variety club mix)" (Remixed by Gordon King and The "Natural" Pete Smith)
- "Avenue (Butlins mix)" (Remixed by Gordon King and The "Natural" Pete Smith)
- "Avenue (Martial mix)" (Remixed by Rudy Tambala/A.R. Kane)
- "Avenue (Venusian mix)" (Remixed by Rudy Tambala/A.R. Kane)

from "You're in a Bad Way"

- "Archway People"
- "California Snow Story"
- "Duke Duvet"
- "St. Etienne Speaks..."

from "Hobart Paving" / "Who Do You Think You Are"

- "Who Do You Think You Are"
- "Who Do You Think You Are (Quex-RD)" (Remixed by Aphex Twin)
- "Your Head My Voice (Voix Revirement)" (Remixed by Aphex Twin)
- "Who Do You Think You Are (Strobelights & Platform Shoes Mix) (Remixed by Roger Sanchez)
- "Who Do You Think You Are (Nu Solution Mix) (Remixed by Roger Sanchez)
- "Who Do You Think You Are (Saturday Night Fever Dub) (Remixed by Roger Sanchez)
- "Who Do You Think You Are (Radio Remix) (Remixed by Roger Sanchez)
