= She's Like the Swallow =

Folk song from Newfoundland

"She's Like the Swallow" (Roud 2306) is a folksong from Newfoundland. According to folklorist Neil V. Rosenberg, the song "appears never to have been widely known and sung in oral tradition" and the popularized version of the song differs significantly from the attested folk versions. The song was first collected by ethnomusicologist Maud Karpeles in 1930.

The English band Saint Etienne used the lyrics in their song "Like the Swallow" on the album Foxbase Alpha.
