= Spain in the Eurovision Song Contest 1995 =

- Eurovision Song Contest 1995
- Participating broadcaster: Televisión Española (TVE)
- Country: Spain
- Selection process: Internal selection
- Announcement date: 6 April 1995

Competing entry
- Song: "Vuelve conmigo"
- Artist: Anabel Conde
- Songwriter: José María Purón

Placement
- Final result: 2nd, 119 points

Participation chronology

Spain was represented at the Eurovision Song Contest 1995 with the song "Vuelve conmigo", written by José María Purón, and performed by Anabel Conde. The Spanish participating broadcaster, Televisión Española (TVE), internally selected its entry for the contest. The song, performed in position 9, placed second out of twenty-three competing entries with 119 points.

== Before Eurovision ==
Televisión Española (TVE) internally selected "Vuelve conmigo" performed by Anabel Conde as its entry for the Eurovision Song Contest 1995 among 32 demos. The song was written by José María Purón. The song, songwriter, and performer were presented on 6 April 1995. The preview music video that was distributed to the other participating broadcasters was filmed in Madrid, with the waterside scenes filmed on location at Juan Carlos I Park featuring the sculpture Dedos, the Spanish replica of La mano.

== At Eurovision ==
On 13 May 1995, the Eurovision Song Contest was held at the Point Theatre in Dublin hosted by Radio Telefís Éireann (RTÉ), and broadcast live throughout the continent. Conde performed "Vuelve conmigo" 9th on the evening, following Austria and preceding Turkey. She was accompanied on stage by Andrea Bronston, Doris Cales, and Sol Pilas as backing singers, and by Emilio Cuervo and José María Guzmán (Note: José María Guzmán had represented Spain in 1986 as a member of Cadillac and as the songwriter of their entry.) as backing percussionists and singers. She was dressed by Javier Larrainzar and the staging and choreography was in charge of Leonor Parrilli. Eduardo Leiva conducted the event's orchestra performance of the Spanish entry. At the close of the voting "Vuelve conmigo" had received 119 points, placing 2nd of 23 and giving Spain's best result since 1979.

The contest was broadcast live on La Primera, and on delay on TVE Internacional, both with commentary by José Luis Uribarri. Before the event, TVE aired a talk show hosted by Concha Galán introducing the Spanish jury, which continued after the contest commenting on the results.

=== Voting ===
TVE assembled a jury panel with sixteen members. The following members comprised the Spanish jury:

- Ángel Lacalle – journalist
- María Kosti – actress
- Roberto Antolín - bullfighter
- Sara Salazar – singer
- Valentín Paredes – actor
- Pilar Socorro – journalist
- Lucio Blázquez – restaurateur, owner of Casa Lucio
- Cuca García de Vinuesa – communication expert
- Alejandro Abad – singer and songwriter, represented Spain in 1994
- Marily Coll – designer
- Arturo Beltrán – bullfighting entrepreneur
- Silvia Abascal – actress
- Enrique Cosano – Eurovision fan
- Agustina López de los Mozos – bookseller
- Justo Molinero – music critic
- Verónica Magaz – student

The jury was chaired by José Visuña, Head of Musical Policy at TVE, with Javier González as secretary, and Belén Fernández de Henestrosa as spokesperson. José Manuel de la Cruz Lagunero was the notary public. These did not have the right to vote, but the president decided in the event of a tie. The jury awarded its maximum of 12 points to Croatia.

Points awarded to Spain
Score	Country
12 points	Belgium; Israel
10 points	Croatia; Cyprus
8 points	Bosnia and Herzegovina; Malta; Poland; Turkey; United Kingdom
7 points	France; Portugal
6 points	Germany; Greece
5 points	Iceland
4 points	
3 points	
2 points	Hungary; Ireland
1 point	

Points awarded by Spain
Score	Country
12 points	Croatia
10 points	Malta
8 points	Greece
7 points	Belgium
6 points	Austria
5 points	Cyprus
4 points	Norway
3 points	Ireland
2 points	Turkey
1 point	Hungary
