= Dusty... Definitely =

Studio album by Dusty Springfield
- Released: 22 November 1968
- Recorded: January–October 1968
- Studio: Philips (London)
- Genre: Pop
- Length: 34:44
- Labels: Philips; SBL 7864 (stereo)
- Producers: Johnny Franz, Dusty Springfield

Dusty Springfield chronology
Where Am I Going? (1967)	Dusty... Definitely (1968)	Dusty in Memphis (1969)

Dusty... Definitely is the fourth studio album by singer Dusty Springfield, recorded and released in the UK in 1968. Production credits go to both Johnny Franz, and for the first time, Springfield herself. The songs on this album were chosen because Springfield "liked them", as stated in the liner notes. Like the vast majority of her LPs, the album shows a diverse range of styles, ranging from soul ("Take Another Little Piece of my Heart"), pop ("This Girl's in Love With You"), folk ("Morning (Bom Dia)") to lounge ("Who (Will Take my Place?)").

The two sides of the album reflected very different moods: the first side was packed with fast-paced, louder numbers, while the second side was more mellow, which Springfield suggested would be suitable for listening to at night.

The album was a moderate success and eventually entered the UK album's charts in the week ending 21 December 1968, peaking at No.30 the following week. However it got to No.8 on the NME year end charts for best albums of 1968.

In 1968, Springfield entered into a contract with Atlantic Records for the United States, which meant that the singer had a different record label for each side of the Atlantic (previously she had been signed to Philips both in the UK and the USA). Springfield's new contract allowed Philips in the UK to release American recordings and Atlantic in the US to release British recordings. This was the first LP to be covered by this agreement. Atlantic was, however, reluctant to release any British recordings on their label; thus, the album was never released in the States.

Tracks from this album were finally released in the US in 1999 (the year of Springfield's death) on the Rhino Records compilation Dusty in London.

In the UK Dusty... Definitely was first released to CD by Philips Records/PolyGram in the early 1990s and in 2001 Mercury Records/Universal Music Group re-released a digitally remastered edition with four bonus tracks.

== Track listing ==
Side A

1. "Ain't No Sun Since You've Been Gone" (Sylvia Moy, Norman Whitfield, Cornelius Grant) – 2:46
2. "Take Another Little Piece of My Heart" (Bert Berns, Jerry Ragovoy) – 2:36
3. "Another Night" (Burt Bacharach, Hal David) – 2:13
4. "Mr Dream Merchant" (Jerry Ross, Larry Weiss) – 3:04
5. "I Can't Give Back the Love I Feel for You" (Nickolas Ashford, Valerie Simpson, Brian Holland) – 2:32
  - Note: 2001 CD-reissue erroneously includes the 1998 remix of the track
6. "Love Power" (Teddy Vann) – 2:09

Side B

1. "This Girl's in Love with You" (Burt Bacharach, Hal David) – 3:37
2. "I Only Wanna Laugh" (William Shannon, Shannon Shor) – 3:06
3. "Who (Will Take My Place)?" (Charles Aznavour, Herbert Kretzmer) – 3:04
4. "I Think It's Gonna Rain Today" (Randy Newman) – 3:14
5. "Morning (Bom Dia)" (Nana Caymmi, Gilberto Gil, Norma Tanega) – 2:46
6. "Second Time Around" (Sammy Cahn, Jimmy Van Heusen) – 3:41

Bonus tracks 2001 CD re-issue

13. "No Stranger Am I" (Norma Tanega) – 2:46
  - First UK release: Philips single BF 1682 (B-side of "I Close My Eyes and Count to Ten"). Release date: 28 June 1968.
14. "Meditation (Meditação)" (Antônio Carlos Jobim, Newton Mendonça, Norman Gimbel) – 1:58
  - Outtake from the Dusty... Definitely sessions. First release: UK 4-CD box set The Legend of Dusty Springfield, 1994.
15. "The Colour of Your Eyes" (Remix) (Molly McKernan, Norma Tanega) – 2:33
  - First UK release (Original mix): Philips single BF 1706 (B-side of "I Will Come to You"). Release date: 20 September 1968.
16. "Spooky" (Buddy Buie, James B. Cobb, Harry Middlebrooks Jr., Mike Shapiro) – 2:44
  - First UK release: Philips single 6006 045 (B-side of "How Can I Be Sure"). Release date: 4 September 1970. (Note: recording date: 24 January 1968).
- Producer tracks 13–16: Johnny Franz.

Other Tracks

"Sweet Lover No More" (David L. Frishberg) – 1:54

- Outtake from the Dusty... Definitely sessions. First release: UK 4-CD box set The Legend of Dusty Springfield, 13 June 1994. Producer: Johnny Franz.

== Personnel and production ==
- Dusty Springfield – lead vocals, backing vocals, production
- Lesley Duncan – backing vocals
- Madeline Bell – backing vocals
- Kay Garner – backing vocals
- John Paul Jones – musical arranger & orchestra conductor, bass
- Keith Mansfield – musical arranger & orchestra conductor
- Peter Knight – orchestra conductor
- Derek Wadsworth – musical arranger
- Jim Tyler – musical arranger
- Johnny Franz – record producer
- Roger Wake – digital remastering/remix (2001 re-issue)
- Mike Gill – digital remastering/remix (2001 re-issue)
