= Eliot Sumner =

English musician and actor (born 1990)

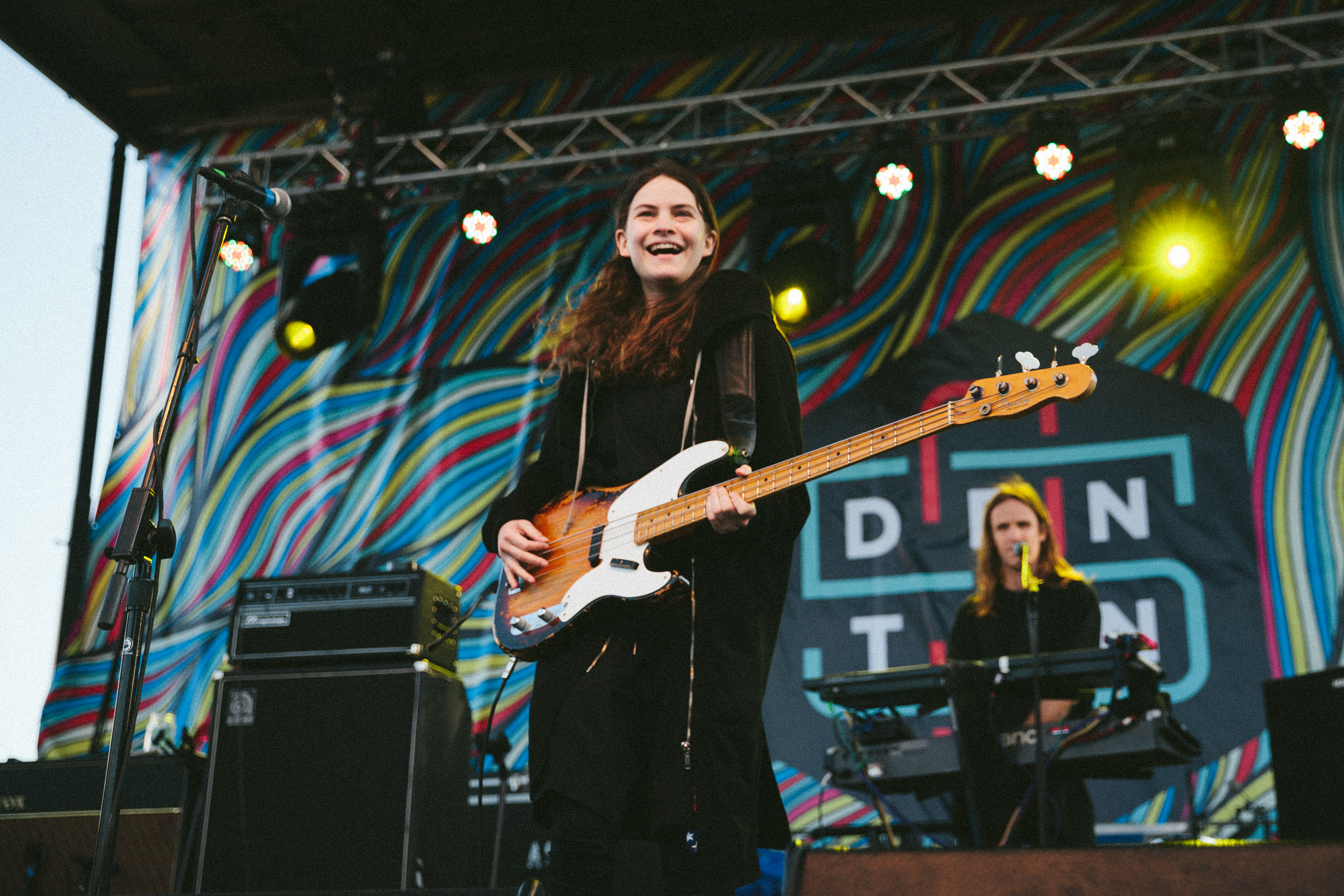
- Sumner performing in 2015

Background information
- Born: 30 July 1990 (age 36); Pisa, Tuscany, Italy
- Genres: Rock; pop; electronic; post-punk revival
- Occupations: Singer; songwriter; music producer; actor
- Years active: 2010–present
- Labels: Island; Cherrytree

Eliot Paulina Sumner (born 30 July 1990) is an English singer, songwriter and actor. They (Note: Sumner does not identify with a particular gender and uses gender-neutral pronouns. For consistency, this article uses they/them pronouns.) are the child of musician Sting and Trudie Styler.

They began their music career at a young age and signed a record deal with Island Records at 17. Sumner released their debut album The Constant in 2010 under the name I Blame Coco. They have acted in films and TV shows, including The Gentlemen and No Time to Die, and Ripley on Netflix in 2024. They were nominated for Best Newcomer at the Virgin Media Music Awards in 2010.

== Early life and education ==
Eliot Paulina Sumner was born on 30 July 1990 in Pisa, Italy to actress Trudie Styler and musician Sting (Gordon Sumner). They grew up in Wiltshire, England, and were educated at Bryanston School and then the Fine Arts College in London.

They grew up at Lake House, the family estate near Stonehenge. Eliot has two brothers (Jake and Giacomo), a sister (Mickey), an older half-brother (Joe), and a half-sister (Kate). Their family gave Sumner the nickname "Coco." Drawn to the outdoors, Sumner spent a lot of time alone in the woods. Their family gave Eliot their first guitar at age four or five.

== Music career ==
=== I Blame Coco ===
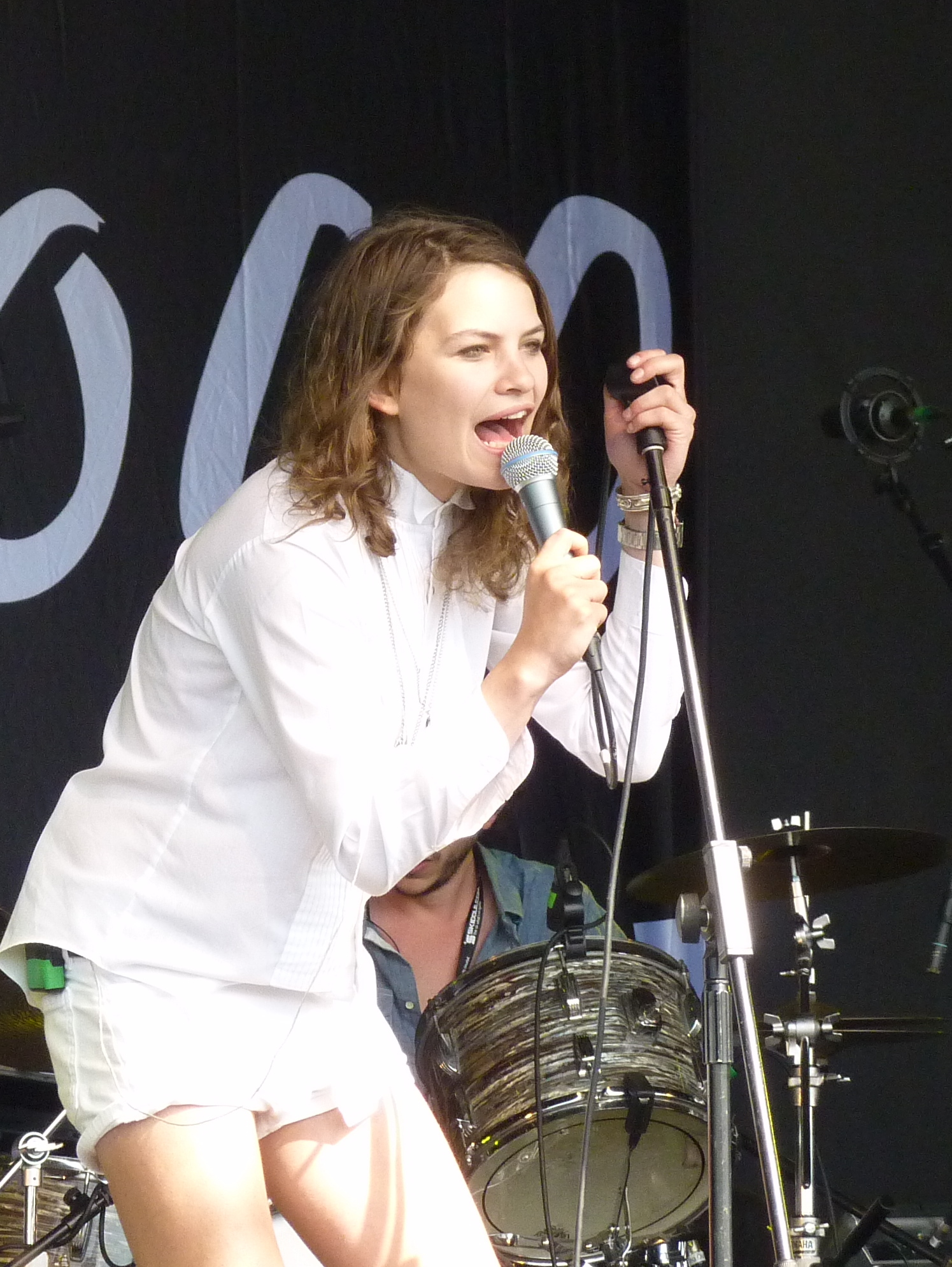
Sumner fronting I Blame Coco, Wickerman Festival, 2010.

Sumner began writing songs at the age of 15, and signed a multi-record deal with Island Records at age 17.

They spent six months writing and recording a debut album, The Constant (2010), in Sweden with producer Klas Åhlund, keyboardist Emlyn Maillard, and multi-instrumentalist and producer Al Shux under the band name I Blame Coco. The album included elements of pop music, electronic music, ska, and punk. The first single, "Caesar", featured Swedish pop singer Robyn. The next single, "Self Machine", was released in July 2010.

According to Christian Wåhlberg, Sumner's manager, Åhlund had been keen to work with Sumner because he saw the "punk rocker" in them. Wåhlberg said that the electropop sound of the album was influenced by Darcus Beese, president of Island Records, and that if Sumner had signed to a different record label, the music would have been different.

After recording and touring with I Blame Coco, they lived alone in a cottage in the Lake District of England and became interested in house music.

=== Solo career ===
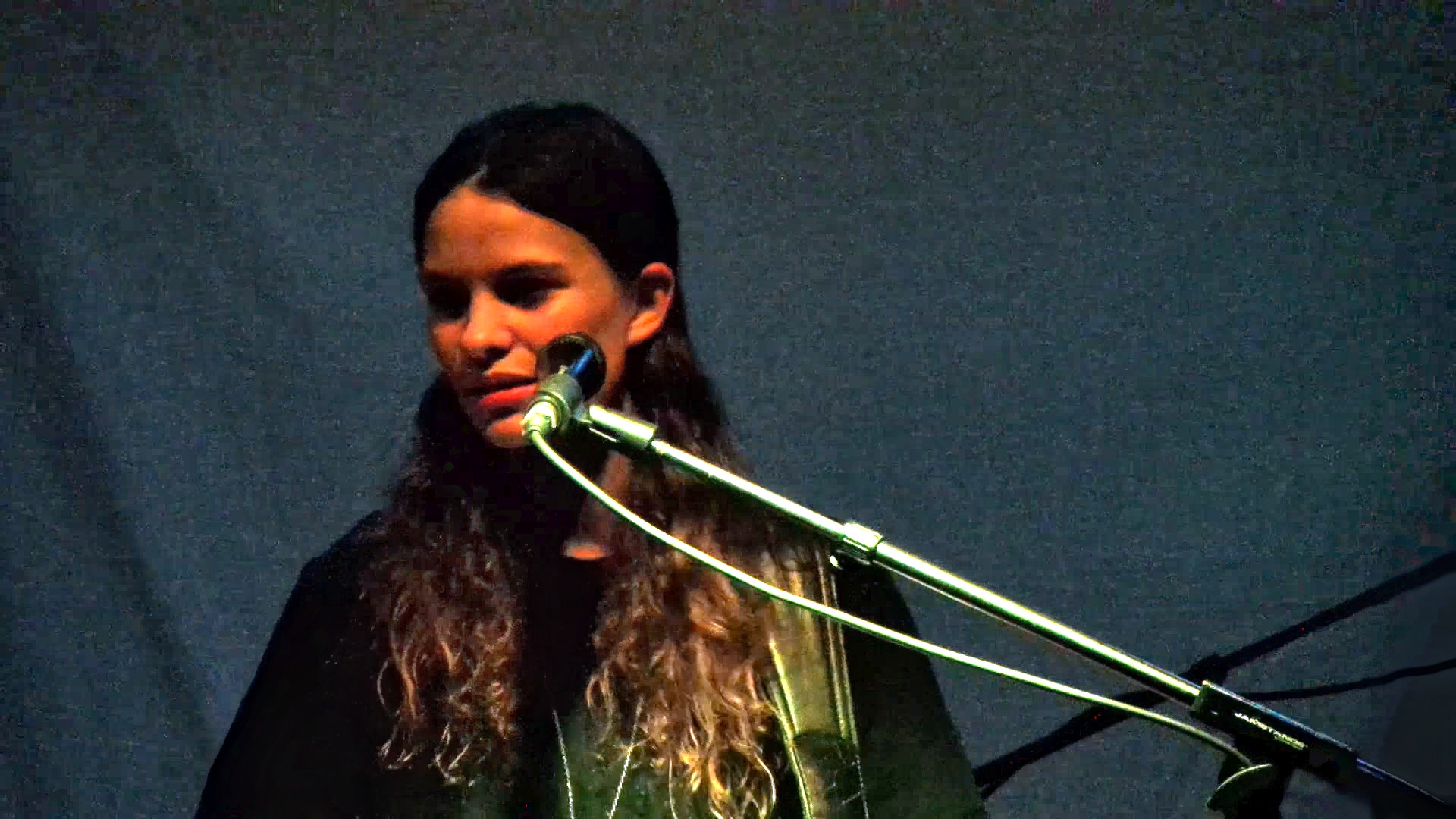
Sumner in 2015

Sumner sang a cover version of the Radiohead song "Creep" with Clint Mansell for the soundtrack to the movie Filth (2013).

In 2014, Sumner said their music would be released under their birth name, Eliot Sumner. Later that year, they released the EP Information, and in 2016 the full album Information appeared. Sumner's contributions to other musicians' albums include vocals for the song "End of the Road" by Sway and the single "Splash" by Sub Focus.

=== DJ ===
As of 2016, Sumner was also working as a DJ in European dance clubs under the moniker "Vaal".

== Acting career ==
Sumner appeared briefly in the films Me Without You (2001) and Stardust (2007). They made their adult acting debut in Guy Ritchie's The Gentlemen in 2020. They appeared in the James Bond film No Time to Die (2021).

They played a hiker in the thriller Infinite Storm, appearing before Naomi Watts' character began hiking to the summit of Mt. Washington.

In December 2021, Sumner was cast in Showtime's drama series Ripley in a recurring role. Sumner plays Freddie, a male character. Ripley was initially announced to be broadcast on Showtime, but in February 2023, it was reported that the series would be moving to Netflix. It was released on 4 April 2024.

Sumner plays the role of hitwoman Kat in the Swedish crime/thriller series Vargasommar (Cry Wolf). The series airs on the Swedish channel TV4 and premiered 25 December 2024.

== Personal life ==
Sumner fractured their skull in a freak accident in an LA restaurant in 2009, and spent four days in intensive care.

In December 2015, Sumner said that they did not believe in gender labels and did not identify with a particular gender. They use gender-neutral pronouns.

== Awards and honours ==
- I Blame Coco was nominated for Best Newcomer at the Virgin Media Music Awards in 2010.

== Discography ==
=== Studio albums ===
Title	Album details	Peak chart positions							
Title	Album details	UK	AUT	BEL (FL)	BEL (WA)	FRA	GER	POL	SWI
The Constant (as I Blame Coco)	Released: 8 November 2010; Label: Island; Formats: CD, digital download	86	58	82	88	41	31	36	72
Information	Released: 22 January 2016; Label: Island; Formats: CD, digital download	—	—	—	—	—	99	—	—
Nosferatu (as Vaal)	Released: 25 January 2019; Label: Pale Blue Dot; Formats: Vinyl	—	—	—	—	—	—	—	—

=== Singles ===
==== As lead artist ====
Title	Year	Peak chart positions				Album
Title	Year	UK	BEL (FL)	BEL (WA)	GER	Album
"Caesar" (featuring Robyn)	2010	—	—	—	—	The Constant
"Selfmachine"	2010	64	53	93	56	The Constant
"Quicker"	2010	—	91	—	—	The Constant
"In Spirit Golden"	2010	—	—	—	—	The Constant
"Turn Your Back on Love"	2011	—	—	—	—	The Constant
"Information"	2014	—	—	—	—	Information
"I Followed You Home"	2014	—	—	—	—	Information
"Dead Arms & Dead Legs"	2015	—	—	—	—	Information
"After Dark"	2015	—	—	—	—	Information
"Firewood"	2015	—	—	—	—	Information
"Species"	2015	—	—	—	—	Information

==== As featured artist ====
Title	Year	Peak chart positions		Album
Title	Year	UK	UK Dance	Album
"Animal" (with Miike Snow)	2009	98	—	Miike Snow
"Splash" (with Sub Focus)	2010	41	7	Sub Focus

==== Other: Remixes ====
- Eliot Sumner – After Dark (Mr Tophat's Alterned 303 Remix)
- Eliot Sumner – After Dark (Dixon Remix)
- Eliot Sumner – Firewood – Lakker Remix

== Music videos ==
Year	Title	Director
2010	"Caesar"	Hope Audikana
2010	"Only Love Can Break Your Heart"	Tom & Tabitha
2010	"Splash"	Nick Frew
2010	"Self Machine"	Alex Smith
2010	"Quicker"	China Moo-Young
2010	"In Spirit Golden"	Hope Audikana
2014	"Information"	Eliot Lee Hazel
2015	"Dead Arms & Dead Legs"	tech wizards, Flat-E
2015	"After Dark"	tech wizards, Flat-E
2015	"Firewood"	tech wizards, Flat-E
2015	"Species"	tech wizards, Flat-E
2015	"I Followed You Home"	
