= Only Love Can Break Your Heart =

1970 single by Neil Young

Single by Neil Young

from the album After the Gold Rush
- B-side: "Birds"
- Released: September 19, 1970
- Recorded: March 15, 1970
- Studio: Neil Young's home, Topanga, California
- Genre: Folk rock
- Length: 3:05
- Label: Reprise
- Songwriter: Neil Young
- Producers: David Briggs; Neil Young

Neil Young singles chronology
"Cinnamon Girl" (1970)	"Only Love Can Break Your Heart" (1970)	"When You Dance I Can Really Love" (1971)

"Only Love Can Break Your Heart" is a song written by Canadian-American singer-songwriter Neil Young. It has been covered by many other artists.

== Genesis and recording ==
The song is the third track on Neil Young's album After the Gold Rush. The song was supposedly written for Graham Nash after Nash's split from Joni Mitchell, though Young in interviews has been somewhat tentative in admitting or remembering this. Bob Giuliana, a filmmaker, claimed the song was about him: "Neil Young wrote a song called 'Only Love Can Break Your Heart.' Neil Young and I shared a best friend, and this friend, Larry Johnson, told me that Neil wrote the song about me. I had never heard it, because I wasn't a Neil Young fan. People think it's about a romance, but it's not. Larry told Neil about the whole story of me leaving the Paradigm film company, which was not fun for me - it was heartbreaking - and then he wrote the song about it."

Released as a single in October 1970, it became Young's first top 40 hit as a solo artist, peaking at number 33 in the US. The single was issued with a Crazy Horse version of "Birds" (rather than the solo piano version of the album) on the B-side, apparently accidentally. The song is praised as a "seemingly simple song which display[s] considerable attention to detail in the deployment of instruments."

Record World said that the song "has [Young's] magic touch."

== Personnel ==
- Neil Young – guitar, vocals
- Danny Whitten – vocals
- Nils Lofgren – piano, vocals
- Greg Reeves – bass
- Ralph Molina – drums, vocals

== Charts ==
Chart (1970–1971)	Peak position
Canada Top Singles (RPM)	16
Netherlands (Dutch Top 40)	18
Netherlands (Single Top 100)	19
US Billboard Hot 100	33

== Saint Etienne version ==
"Only Love Can Break Your Heart"

Single by Saint Etienne featuring Moira Lambert

from the album Foxbase Alpha
- B-side: "The Official Saint Etienne World Cup Theme" (UK); "Filthy" (UK reissue); "Stoned to Say the Least" (United States)
- Released: May 28, 1990
- Recorded: January 1990
- Genre: House; dub; indie pop; Europop; dance-pop
- Length: 4:29
- Label: Heavenly
- Songwriter: Neil Young

Saint Etienne singles chronology
"Only Love Can Break Your Heart" (1990)	"Kiss and Make Up" (1990)
Nothing Can Stop Us (1991)	Only Love Can Break Your Heart (1991)	Avenue (1992)

Music video
- "Only Love Can Break Your Heart" on YouTube

In 1990, English band Saint Etienne recorded a cover version of "Only Love Can Break Your Heart", which was included on their debut album, Foxbase Alpha (1991). The vocals are by Moira Lambert (Sarah Cracknell had not yet joined the band as a permanent member). The band recorded the song in producer Ian Catt's bedroom studio in Pollards Hill. The recording, made in under two hours, got them a record deal, their first single, and their first hit. Andrew Weatherall later remixed the song, further emphasising its dub bassline: this remix, subtitled "A Mix of Two Halves" (duration 9:02, often with the intro omitted to make it 8:49), was featured on both releases of the single and on the compilation Casino Classics. US and European releases erroneously claimed to contain this mix, but actually played a different extended mix by Flowered Up (duration 6:19). Weatherall had no involvement with this mix, which was originally issued in the UK in 1990 on a flexidisc.

=== Release ===
The song was re-released in the UK as a double A-side with the track "Filthy", peaking at number 39 in the UK Singles Chart. "Filthy", was later covered as "Jungle Pulse" by Etienne Daho. The song remains Saint Etienne's only entry in the US Billboard Hot 100, peaking at number 97 in 1992. It did, however, top the US Hot Dance Club Play chart. The US b-side to the single was the Foxbase Alpha album track "Stoned to Say the Least."

In December 1990, Melody Maker ranked Saint Etienne's version of "Only Love Can Break Your Heart" number 18 in their list of "Singles of the Year", writing, "A shimmering post-House triumph. Seduction had never sounded so sorrowful." In 2003, Vibe listed Masters at Work's remix of the song as one of the "Top 25 Remixes Ever Created", while in 2019, Spin Magazine ranked it among "The 40 Best Deep House Tracks of All Time".

=== Critical reception ===
In contemporary reviews, Larry Flick from Billboard wrote that the band reinterprets the tune "into a glowing swing/hip-hop jam." Ian Gittins from Melody Maker declared it as a "impossibly wistful wisp of coming-down pop", adding, "Second time around, St Etienne's delicate duffing-up of crinkle-chops Neil Young' tuff'n'tender lament still echoes poignantly, so transient and translucent, as if only synth and sighs prevent its heart cracking into a thousand lovely, lonely pieces." David Giles from Music Week stated that the song is "sung in beautifully husky tones, and set to a snails-pace dance rhythm, that is already proving immensely popular at club level." Roger Morton from NME felt that Saint Etienne's version "should nark a few old hippies because the original melody is thoroughly streamrollered by a crushing Soul II Soul type beat. Neo-lover's rock in feel, it scores points both for the idea and the execution." A reviewer from Smash Hits named it a "brilliant dance version".

In retrospective reviews, Justin Chadwick from Albumism described the cover version as "stirring", stating that it "manages to stay faithful to the original's melancholy weight while transforming Young's minimalist composition into a fresh and thrilling dancefloor-friendly affair." He added, "Propelled by multi-layered dub basslines, house rhythms, piano loops, and pounding drum breaks, the group's interpolation sounds little like Young's 1970 single, save for the equally plaintive power of Lambert's ruminations." Stephen Thomas Erlewine from AllMusic said it is "not only cleverly ironic, but also works".

=== Music video ===
Two music videos were released for the single. The original version was directed by Nicola Baldwin and partly shot by her in black and white Super 8. It depicts Lucy Gillie from early 90s pop trio Golden miming the vocals (Lambert refused to appear in the video). The second features Cracknell miming to Lambert's vocals and depicts the band entering a cinema in a small French town (that inspired the group's name) where they see themselves in a movie. The act includes this song in their live shows with Cracknell performing the song.

=== Charts ===
Chart (1991–1992)	Peak position
Australia (ARIA)	155
UK Singles (OCC)	39
UK Airplay (Music Week)	56
UK Dance (Music Week)	22
US Billboard Hot 100	97
US Hot Dance Club Play (Billboard)	1
US Alternative Airplay (Billboard)	11

=== Certifications ===
Region	Certification	Certified units/sales
United Kingdom (BPI)	Silver	200,000^{‡}
^{‡} Sales+streaming figures based on certification alone.

== Other cover versions ==
- Jackie DeShannon - Jackie (1972)
- David T Walker - David T Walker (1973)
- Anne Kirkpatrick - Let the Songs Keep Flowing Strong & Naturally (1976)
- Elkie Brooks - Shooting Star also single (#43 UK) (1978): "[This] noncaring dance-beat version of Neil Young's heartrending 'Only Love Can Break Your Heart' cheapens the singer more than the song" - Toby Goldstein in High Fidelity
- Stephen Stills - Right by You (1984: features additional lyrics by Stills)
- Crosby, Stills, Nash & Young performed the song during their Live Aid set in 1985.
- The Mint Juleps - single (1986: #62 UK)
- Psychic TV played the song on The Bridge: A Tribute to Neil Young in 1989.
- A sampled portion of the Saint Etienne version was used in a remix for Chez Damier's 1992 single "Can You Feel It".
- Everlast covered the song for the 1999 film Big Daddy.
- The Corrs - VH1 Presents: The Corrs, Live in Dublin (2002): The New Rolling Stone Album Guide called their version "pretty but lightweight."
- Juliana Hatfield - Gold Stars 1992-2002 (2002)
- Gwyneth Herbert - Bittersweet and Blue (2004: featured in the 2010 film release Leap Year)
- The New Standards - The New Standards (2005)
- Bradford Cox aka Atlas Sound covered the song for his blog in 2007.
- Damien Leith covered the song on his album Catch the Wind: Songs of a Generation in 2008.
- Long John Baldry - duet with Joyce Everson from 1972 sessions for Everything Stops for Tea featured as bonus track on that album's re-release (2007)
- Nils Lofgren - The Loner – Nils Sings Neil (2008)
- Kathleen Edwards recorded the song live for her iTunes exclusive Live Session in 2008.
- Butch Walker released a live version on his iTunes release Live from Lollapalooza in 2008.
- Angie Hart - Eat My Shadow (2009)
- The S.I.G.I.T. - Hertz Dyslexia (2009, split EP)
- Jenn Grant - Echoes (2009)
- I Blame Coco has recorded covers of both the Neil Young and Saint Etienne versions of the song. A cover of Young's version was released with Fyfe Dangerfield in 2010. A cover of the Saint Etienne version appears on the album The Constant.
- Beccy Cole - Preloved (2010)
- Rickie Lee Jones - The Devil You Know (2012): "One of the [album's] more fleshed-out tunes...and ...also [its] loveliest, a heartbreaker that will make you forget...Neil's version. Guitar, some organ, piano, and the barest of backing vocals give Jones the space she needs to slowly destroy you, if you're hurting or have ever been hurt by a lover." - Michael H. Smith @The Vinyl District
- Ida Sand - Young at Heart (2015)
- Natalie Imbruglia - Male (2015)
- Asami Zdrenka of Neon Jungle covered the Saint Etienne version as part of her A Cover Trilogy series in 2015.
- Florence and the Machine - B-Side of "Delilah" (2016)
- AJ Croce - By Request (2021)
- Jill Andrews - Ellen (2021)
