= Timewarp / Join the Dots =

Single by Sub Focus

from the album Sub Focus
- Released: 16 June 2008
- Recorded: 2007–08
- Genre: Drum and bass
- Length: 5:19 ("Timewarp"); 4:46 ("Join the Dots")
- Label: RAM
- Songwriter: Nick Douwma
- Producer: Sub Focus

Sub Focus singles chronology
"Special Place / Druggy" (2007)	"Timewarp / Join the Dots" (2008)	"Rock It / Follow the Light" (2009)

"Timewarp / Join the Dots" is the first single from drum and bass artist Sub Focus to be released from the self-titled debut album Sub Focus. The single managed to reach number 92 on the UK Singles Chart and number seven on the UK Dance Chart.

== Track listing ==
Digital download
No.	Title	Length
1.	"Timewarp"	5:19
2.	"Join the Dots"	4:46

== Chart performance ==
Chart (2008)	Peak position
UK Singles (Official Charts Company)	92

== Release history ==
Region	Date	Format
United Kingdom	16 June 2008	Digital download
