= Nothing Can Stop Us (song) =

Single by Saint Etienne

from the album Foxbase Alpha
- A-side: "Speedwell"
- B-side: "3D Tiger"
- Released: May 1991; 14 October 1991 (reissue)
- Genre: Northern soul; indie pop; alternative dance
- Label: Heavenly Records - HVN9
- Songwriters: Bob Stanley; Pete Wiggs

Saint Etienne singles chronology
"Kiss and Make Up" (1990)	"Nothing Can Stop Us" (1991)	"Only Love Can Break Your Heart (reissue)" (1991)

Music video
- "Nothing Can Stop Us" on YouTube

"Nothing Can Stop Us" is a song by English band Saint Etienne, released in May 1991 by Heavenly Records as the third single from their debut album, Foxbase Alpha (1991). It is the first release to feature Sarah Cracknell, who would continue to front the band from this release on. The single reached the number one spot on the American dance charts for one week. The song is based on a looped sample from Dusty Springfield's recording of "I Can't Wait Until I See My Baby's Face".

"Nothing Can Stop Us" was released as a double A side with "Speedwell". As such, "Speedwell" takes lead track duty on the remix 12" single with the Flying Mix and Project Mix. The American remixes were done by the Masters At Work team of Kenny "Dope" Gonzales and Little Louie Vega. The lyric was partly re-written for these mixes, and the changes were retained in subsequent live performances. In 1994, Saint Etienne produced a new version of the song for Kylie Minogue, which was released as a b-side on her single "Confide in Me". Rose Gray has also released a version of the song.

== Critical reception ==
Larry Flick from Billboard magazine felt the band returns with a similar-sounding jam to "Only Love Can Break Your Heart". He wrote, "In its original form, the tune is an endearing modern-pop gem. With a little (make that a lot) of help from remixers Louie Vega and Kenny Gonzalez, the track is now a hip deep-houser that should thrill club jocks upon impact." Everett True from Melody Maker praised it as "magnificent!" Davydd Chong from Music Week's RM Dance Update said it "sounds so familiar, so classic, that you first thought is that it's another cover version. The breathy vocals of Sarah Cracknell, the joyous strings, the impish guitar licks and the loving kiss of romantic optimism belong to the Northern Soul era, but, no, it's a St Etienne original." Another RM editor, James Hamilton, added, "Whispered and crooned by new girl Sarah, this applause intro/outroed haunting strangely 1965-like 0-115.2-0bpm clanking swayer has a slinky Fontella Bass-type bassline with real woodwinds and brass".

Mandi James from NME wrote, "Music to swoon to. Pure sexy vibes, breathless vocals and brilliant drum rolls. Haunted by the spectre of Northern Soul, wrapped in perfect pop melodies and probably the best record this year." Another NME editor, Jim Wirth, noted that "it's funky, it's got flutes, and it's a totally awesome pop song. There's nothing even remotely ironic about that." Mark Frith from Smash Hits commented, "Their music is light and ambient but dancey with it. Vocals are breathy and euphoric." In a 2016 retrospective review, Justin Chadwick from Albumism remarked the "buoyant throwback soul" of the song, naming it an "indisputable highlight" from the Foxbase Alpha album.

== Music video ==
There were produced two different music videos for "Nothing Can Stop Us". The original features the band driving and walking around central London with a late 60s movie style. The second version only featured the group utilizing the remixes done in a sixties-esque background setting.

== Track listing ==
All tracks are written by Bob Stanley and Pete Wiggs.

7": Heavenly / HVN9 and 12" (HVN9 12)
No.	Title	Length
1.	"Nothing Can Stop Us"	3:58
2.	"Speedwell"	6:31

12": Heavenly / HVN9 12R
No.	Title	Length
1.	"Speedwell (Flying Mix)"	3:58
2.	"Speedwell (Project Mix)"	6:31
3.	"Nothing Can Stop Us (Instrumental)"	4:14
4.	"3D Tiger"	4:01

12": Warner Bros. / 9 40395-0
No.	Title	Length
1.	"Nothing Can Stop Us (twelve inch remix)"	4:55
2.	"Nothing Can Stop Us (kenlou dub)"	5:52
3.	"Nothing Can Stop Us (bonus beats)"	4:11
4.	"Nothing Can Stop Us (house mix)"	4:50
5.	"Nothing Can Stop Us (masters at work dub)"	5:15
6.	"Speedwell"	6:32

CD: Heavenly / HVN9CD
No.	Title	Length
1.	"Nothing Can Stop Us"	3:58
2.	"Speedwell"	6:31
3.	"Nothing Can Stop Us (Instrumental)"	4:16

CD: Warner Bros. / 9 40395-2
No.	Title	Length
1.	"Nothing Can Stop Us (single remix)"	3:58
2.	"Nothing Can Stop Us (twelve inch remix)"	4:55
3.	"Nothing Can Stop Us (house mix)"	4:50
4.	"Speedwell"	6:32
5.	"Nothing Can Stop Us (kenlou dub)"	5:52
6.	"Nothing Can Stop Us (masters at work dub)"	5:15

== Charts ==
Chart (1991)	Peak position
UK Singles (OCC)	54
UK Dance (Music Week)	16
UK Club Chart (Record Mirror)	20
US Dance/Electronic Singles Sales (Billboard)	15
US Hot Dance Club Play (Billboard)	1
