= The Wharf (newspaper) =

Free newspaper in London, England

The Wharf was a free local newspaper produced at Canary Wharf, England.

It was set up in 1998, as such covering the transformation of the Isle of Dogs as it became an important financial centre. The Wharf was based in One Canada Square, a sister paper to the Daily Mirror, the Sunday Mirror and The People, all part of the Mirror Group Newspapers, itself part of Trinity Mirror now Reach PLC.

A free publication, The Wharf was published weekly and aimed to provide news and entertainment to the tens of thousands of people who work on the Canary Wharf estate. The title ceased publication in December 2018. In February 2019, former staff members set up Wharf Life, a fortnightly publication as a spiritual successor.

== See also ==
- List of newspapers in the United Kingdom
