= Belgium in the Eurovision Song Contest 1995 =

- Eurovision Song Contest 1995
- Participating broadcaster: Radio-télévision belge de la Communauté française (RTBF)
- Country: Belgium
- Selection process: Finale Nationale du Concours Eurovision de la Chanson 1995
- Selection date: 12 March 1995

Competing entry
- Song: "La voix est libre"
- Artist: Frédéric Etherlinck
- Songwriter: Pierre Theunis

Placement
- Final result: 20th, 8 points

Participation chronology

Belgium was represented at the Eurovision Song Contest 1995 with the song "La voix est libre", written by Pierre Theunis, and performed by Frédéric Etherlinck. The Belgian participating broadcaster, Walloon Radio-télévision belge de la Communauté française (RTBF), selected its entry through a national final.

== Before Eurovision ==
=== Finale Nationale du Concours Eurovision de la Chanson 1995 ===
Walloon broadcaster Radio-télévision belge de la Communauté française (RTBF) had the turn to participate in the Eurovision Song Contest 1995 representing Belgium. The national selection was broadcast live at 20:10 CET on RTBF 1 on 12 March 1995 from studio 6 in the RTBF studios and was hosted by Thierry Luthers. Ten songs competed, chosen from 192 submitted entries. The winner was chosen by six regional juries (Brabant, Hainaut, Liège, Luxembourg, Namur, and Brussels), plus a jury consisting of music professionals. All the juries awarded points to the songs in the same way as is done in the Eurovision Song Contest: 12 points to the top song, 10 points to the second top song, then 8 down to 1 point for the rest of the top ten songs.

Final – 12 March 1995
R/O	Artist	Song	Composer	Lyricist	Points	Place
1	Frédéric Etherlinck	"La voix est libre"	Pierre Theunis		58	1
2	Belinda	"Plus jamais"	Dothée; Defourny; Jakic; Murgia		52	2
3	Teddy Laventure	"Soleil et Lune"	Pierre Gillet	Thérésa Lagerval	37	8
4	Power People	"Sileila"	Power People	Jean-Louis Fayt	49	3
5	Dominique Malerat	"Rien que pour lui"	Yves Disclez		27	9
6	Bea Luna	"L'Univers"	Tony Baron	Bea Luna	46	4
7	Elani	"Pour l'éternité"	Richard Jacques	Marie-Ange Herman	7	10
8	Largo	"Lola"	Marc Van Eyck; Philippe Van Heer; Mustafa Largo		45	5
9	Nathalie Lavigne	"Si je m'envole"	Gianni Marzano; Antonio Crisci; Fred Derytd		40	7
10	Valerie Buggea	"Si un jour"	Daniel Willems; Jean-Luc Brasseur	Philippe Warlomont	45	5

Detailed jury votes
R/O	Song	Regional Juries						Professional Jury	Total
R/O	Song	Brussels	Brabant	Hainaut	Liège	Luxembourg	Namur	Professional Jury	Total
1	"La voix est libre"	6	12	8	7	12	6	7	58
2	"Plus jamais"	4	10	10	12	7	5	4	52
3	"Soleil et Lune"	2	5	2	3	8	7	10	37
4	"Sileila"	12	2	3	4	4	12	12	49
5	"Rien que pour lui"	3	3	5	5	5	4	2	27
6	"L'Univers"	8	7	6	6	6	8	5	46
7	"Pour l'éternité"	1	1	1	1	1	1	1	7
8	"Lola"	7	4	4	2	10	10	8	45
9	"Si je m'envole"	10	8	7	8	2	2	3	40
10	"Si un jour"	5	6	12	10	3	3	6	45

== At Eurovision ==
Frédéric Etherlinck performed 14th in the running order of the contest, following Hungary and preceding the United Kingdom. "La voix est libre" received 8 points, 7 from Spain and 1 from Austria, placing 20th of 23 countries competing.

The contest was broadcast on RTBF1 (with commentary by Jean-Pierre Hautier) and on TV1 (with commentary by André Vermeulen).

=== Voting ===
Points awarded to Belgium
Score	Country
12 points	
10 points	
8 points	
7 points	Spain
6 points	
5 points	
4 points	
3 points	
2 points	
1 point	Austria

Points awarded by Belgium
Score	Country
12 points	Spain
10 points	Austria
8 points	Cyprus
7 points	United Kingdom
6 points	France
5 points	Norway
4 points	Israel
3 points	Denmark
2 points	Greece
1 point	Turkey
