= Q-Tee =

British rapper

- Born: Tatiana Mais; Kidbrooke, London, England
- Genres: Dance, hip hop, R&B
- Occupations: Rapper, songwriter
- Instrument: Vocals
- Years active: 1990–1996
- Labels: Heavenly Records

Tatiana Mais (also incorrectly credited as Tatsiana Mais) is the birth name of 1990s British songwriter and rapper Q-Tee. She is also known as Tatiana Oriana and Tatiana Ellis.

== Early life and education ==
Mais was born in Kidbrooke, in south-east London.

She is a graduate of the performing and creative arts college, BRIT School.

== Music career ==
Mais provided rapping vocals on two songs by Saint Etienne; the first of these being "Filthy" (B-side to "Only Love Can Break Your Heart" and also released on Smash The System: Singles and More) and the second being "Calico" (on So Tough). At the time she recorded these songs she was 15 years old. In 1990, she was the featured vocalist on History's UK No. 42 hit, "Afrika".

In 1993, Q-Tee provided rapping vocals on "Beautiful" by Babble, who were essentially the last two remaining members of Thompson Twins. It was released on their album The Stone (Warner Bros./Reprise Records), and remixes were also released on the double A-side single, "Beautiful"/"Tribe".

In 1995, Q-Tee co-wrote the song "Love City Groove", which the band Love City Groove took to Eurovision 1995. She was incorrectly credited as "Tatsiana Mais" for the event.

She was signed to a recording contract to Saint Etienne's label, Heavenly Records in her own right four years later, and released one song, "Gimme That Body" in January 1996. The single reached No. 40 on the UK Singles Chart. She also provided rapping vocals on Mark Morrison's 1996 single "Horny".

== Other activities ==
In 2008, Mais published Melodies of a Ghetto Princess, which "deals with failed relationships and life changing decisions".

As Tatiana Oriana, she founded the R.O.M.E.L. ("Realising Our Meaning Emancipates Life") Foundation, which seeks to bring about change through the arts, after her son died of a heart condition in 2005. She was later known as Tatiana Ellis.
