= Kiss and Make Up (Saint Etienne song) =

Single by Saint Etienne

from the album Foxbase Alpha
- B-side: "Sky's Dead"
- Released: 1 October 1990
- Genre: House; reggae; dream pop
- Label: Heavenly
- Songwriters: A side: Wratten/Hiscock; B side: Stanley/Wiggs

Saint Etienne singles chronology
"Only Love Can Break Your Heart" (1990)	"Kiss and Make Up" (1990)	"Nothing Can Stop Us" (1991)

Music video
- "Kiss And Make Up" on YouTube

"Kiss and Make Up" is a song by English band Saint Etienne, released as a single in 1990. It features Donna Savage of New Zealand indie pop band Dead Famous People and is a cover version of "Let's Kiss and Make Up", a song by The Field Mice from their 1989 album, Snowball. The single peaked at number 80 on the UK Singles Chart.

== Background ==
Saint Etienne were "drinking buddies" with Michael Hiscock from The Field Mice. The group recorded two demos of this song in their first studio session in January 1990, with Moira Lambert on lead vocals. Notably, they would go on to record with her what would become their first hit single, "Only Love Can Break Your Heart," in that same session. The first demo of "Kiss And Make Up" was released as a bonus track on the group's 2009 release, Foxbase Beta, a remix of their 1991 debut album, Foxbase Alpha, the second demo was released on the 25th anniversary vinyl boxset of same album.

A re-recorded version of "Kiss And Make Up," with New Zealand singer Donna Savage of Dead Famous People on vocals, was released in 1990 by Heavenly Records as the band's follow-up single to "Only Love Can Break Your Heart." This version can be found on several compilation albums.

"Kiss and Make Up" does not feature on the original UK version of Foxbase Alpha, but does feature on the US release. The US release contains a fourth version of the song, re-recorded with Sarah Cracknell on vocals. Cracknell had recently joined Saint Etienne as the group's full-time vocalist.

== Reception ==
In a 2016 retrospective review, Justin Chadwick from Albumism described "Kiss and Make Up" as a "piano-driven house number". Stephen Thomas Erlewine from AllMusic noted its "irresistible girl group pop". Upon the release, Everett True from Melody Maker wrote, "After repeated listening, time spent happily lost inside the dreamy, slightly ambient tone of this dance track, I have come to a conclusion: this is fab. It has a slightly androgynous female vocal, a piano which cascaded like a rivulet of water from pillar to post, drum machines which take on human characteristics all of their own, words of hope and wistfulness, more piano which, mirroring the percussion, keeps pounding away, a bass line that makes my head swoon." Selina Webb from Music Week found that Donna Savage "lends her husky tones to this moody swayer", adding that "this, despite its only footshuffling dance appeal, should take them closer to crossover success."

Jack Barron from NME felt that Saint Etienne's new single is "totally addictive", "setting a very white indie female voice against a chugging bassline." Another NME editor noted, "This is mellow. A product of house-tuned bodies slowing down even further than the Soul II Soul shuffle and spliffing up to a soft skanking rhythm." A reviewer from Smash Hits commented, "These are the people who brought us the brilliant dance version of old hippy Neil Young's "Only Love Can Break Your Heart" tune. This, their second single, is a house reggae cover of a tune written by some weedy indie group called The Field Mice (!). Incredibly girlie and irritating, but there's something quite "appealing" about it."

== Track listing ==
All tracks written and composed by Robert Wratten and Michael Hiscock; except where indicated.

- 7" - Heavenly / HVN4
1. "Kiss and Make Up" – 4:09
2. "Sky's Dead" (Stanley, Wiggs) – 3:02
- 12" - Heavenly / HVN4 12
1. "Kiss and Make Up (Extended Version)" – 6:19
2. "Sky's Dead" (Stanley, Wiggs) – 7:32
- 12" - Heavenly / HVN4 12R
1. "Kiss and Make Up (Midsummer Madness Mix)" – 8:19
2. "Kiss and Make (Midsummer Dubness Mix)" – 7:10

Note: Pete Heller - Producer, Additional Keyboards, Additional Programming

- CD - Heavenly / HVN4CD
1. "Kiss and Make Up" – 4:09
2. "Kiss and Make (Extended Version)" – 6:19
3. "Sky's Dead" (Stanley, Wiggs) – 7:32

== Charts ==
Chart (1990)	Peak position
UK Singles (OCC)	80
