= Saint Etienne discography =

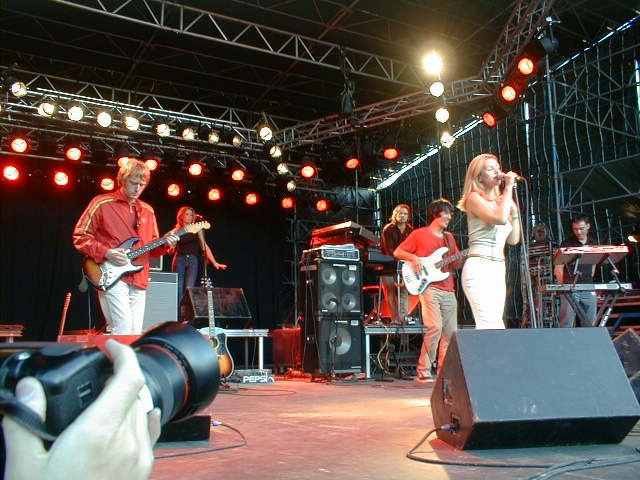
- Saint Etienne performing at Fanclub festival in Sweden, July 1998
- Studio albums: 12
- Extended plays: 4
- Soundtrack albums: 2
- Compilation albums: 9
- Singles: 38
- Video albums: 2
- Remix albums: 2
- Mix albums: 7
- Box sets: 1
- Promotional singles: 5

English alternative dance band Saint Etienne have released thirteen studio albums, two soundtrack albums, nine compilation albums, two remix albums, seven mix albums, two video albums, one box set, four extended plays, 38 singles (including one as a featured artist), and five promotional singles.

== Albums ==
=== Studio albums ===
List of studio albums, with selected chart positions
Title	Details	Peak chart positions										
Title	Details	UK	AUS	BEL (WA)	FRA	GER	JPN	NOR	SPA	SCO	SWE	US Dance
Foxbase Alpha	Released: 16 September 1991; Label: Heavenly; Formats: CD, LP, cassette, digital download	34	—	—	—	—	—	—	—	—	—	—
So Tough	Released: 22 February 1993; Label: Heavenly; Formats: CD, LP, MiniDisc, cassette, digital download	7	175	—	—	—	—	—	—	—	—	—
Tiger Bay	Released: 28 February 1994; Label: Heavenly; Formats: CD, LP, cassette, digital download	8	178	—	—	—	—	—	—	17	31	—
Good Humor	Released: 3 May 1998; Label: Creation; Formats: CD, LP, digital download	18	186	—	—	—	75	11	—	28	51	—
Sound of Water	Released: 22 June 2000; Label: Mantra; Formats: CD, LP, cassette, digital download	33	96	—	—	—	—	23	—	31	47	—
Finisterre	Released: 30 September 2002; Label: Mantra; Formats: CD, LP, cassette, digital download	55	149	—	—	92	—	—	—	68	—	11
Tales from Turnpike House	Released: 13 June 2005; Label: Sanctuary; Formats: CD, LP, digital download	72	—	—	174	—	—	—	—	—	—	10
Words and Music by Saint Etienne	Released: 18 May 2012; Label: Heavenly, Universal UMC; Formats: CD, LP, digital download	26	—	—	—	—	—	—	87	29	41	18
Home Counties	Released: 2 June 2017; Label: Heavenly; Formats: CD, LP, cassette, digital download	31	—	97	—	—	—	—	86	22	—	—
I've Been Trying to Tell You	Released: 10 September 2021; Label: Heavenly; Formats: CD, LP, digital download	14	—	—	—	—	—	—	—	7	—	—
The Night	Released: 13 December 2024; Label: Heavenly; Formats: CD, LP, digital download	—	—	—	—	—	—	—	—	65	—	—
International	Released: 5 September 2025; Label: Heavenly; Formats: CD, LP, digital download	8	77	—	—	—	—	—	—	2	—	—
"—" denotes a recording that did not chart or was not released in that territory.

=== Soundtrack albums ===
Title	Details
The Misadventures of Saint Etienne	Released: 14 September 1999; Label: L'Appareil-Photo Bis; Formats: CD, LP
What Have You Done Today Mervyn Day?	Released: 27 November 2006; Label: Foreign Office; Format: CD

=== Compilation albums ===
List of compilation albums, with selected chart positions
Title	Details	Peak chart positions			Certifications
Title	Details	UK	SCO	US Dance	Certifications
You Need a Mess of Help to Stand Alone	Released: November 1993; Label: Heavenly; Formats: CD, LP	—	—	—	
Fairy Tales from Saint Etienne	Released: 10 May 1995; Label: Warner Bros.; Format: CD	—	—	—	
Too Young to Die: Singles 1990–1995	Released: 13 November 1995; Label: Heavenly; Formats: CD, LP, cassette	17	32	—	BPI: Gold
Continental	Released: 21 June 1997; Label: L'Appareil-Photo, Readymade; Formats: CD, LP, digital download	—	—	—	
Fairfax High (Note: Fairfax High was released as a bonus disc on the US limited edition of Good Humor.)	Released: 8 September 1998; Label: Sub Pop; Format: CD	—	—	—	
Interlude	Released: 20 February 2001; Label: Sub Pop; Format: CD, LP	—	—	—	
Smash the System: Singles and More	Released: 17 September 2001; Label: Heavenly, Columbia; Format: CD	84	99	—	
Travel Edition 1990–2005	Released: 22 November 2004; Label: Sub Pop; Formats: CD, LP	—	—	20	
London Conversations: The Best of Saint Etienne	Released: 16 February 2009; Label: Heavenly; Formats: CD, LP, digital download	79	96	—	
"—" denotes a recording that did not chart or was not released in that territory.

=== Remix albums ===
List of remix albums, with selected chart positions
Title	Details	Peak chart positions	
Title	Details	UK	SCO
Casino Classics	Released: 7 October 1996; Label: Heavenly; Formats: CD, LP, cassette, digital download	34	45
Foxbase Beta	Released: 12 October 2009; Label: Heavenly; Formats: CD, digital download	—	—
Mondo Casino	Released: 13 October 2018; Label: Heavenly; Formats: Limited edition CD	—	—
"—" denotes a recording that did not chart or was not released in that territory.

=== Mix albums ===
List of mix albums, with selected chart positions
Title	Details	Peaks
Title	Details	UK Comp
Songs for Mario's Cafe	Released: 28 June 2004; Label: Discotheque, Sanctuary; Formats: CD	—
The Trip Created by Saint Etienne	Released: 27 September 2004; Label: Family; Formats: CD, LP, digital download	93
Songs for the Dog & Duck	Released: 2 November 2009; Label: Ace; Formats: CD	—
Songs for the Lyons Cornerhouse	Released: 9 July 2012; Label: Cherry Red; Format: CD	—
Songs for a Central Park Picnic	Released: 29 July 2013; Label: Croydon Municipal; Formats: CD, digital download	—
Songs for a London Winter	Released: 24 November 2014; Label: Croydon Municipal; Formats: CD, digital download	—
Songs for the Carnegie Deli	Released: 29 January 2016; Label: Ace; Format: CD	—
"—" denotes a recording that did not chart or was not released in that territory.

=== Video albums ===
Title	Details
Too Young to Die: Videos 1990–1995	Released: 1995; Label: Wienerworld Presentation; Format: VHS
Smash the System: Videos and More	Released: 16 September 2002; Label: Heavenly, SMV Enterprises; Format: DVD

=== Box sets ===
Title	Details	Notes
Saint Etienne on 45: Part One	Released: 16 April 2011; Label: Heavenly, Universal UMC; Format: 7" vinyl	Box set of six seven-inch singles—each one a Saint Etienne single not previously released on seven-inch vinyl—released exclusively for Record Store Day and limited to 1,500 copies.

== Extended plays ==
List of extended plays, with selected chart positions
Title	Details	Peak chart positions		
Title	Details	UK	BEL (WA)	FRA
The Fred EP (with Flowered Up and The Rockingbirds)	Released: 26 October 1992; Label: Heavenly, Columbia; Formats: CD, 7" vinyl, 12" vinyl	26	—	—
Reserection (with Étienne Daho; as St. Etienne Daho)	Released: 29 September 1995; Label: Virgin; Formats: CD, LP, digital download	50	22	12
Places to Visit	Released: 4 May 1999; Label: Sub Pop; Formats: CD, 12" vinyl, digital download	—	—	—
Up the Wooden Hills (Note: Up the Wooden Hills was released as a bonus EP on the UK limited edition of Tales from Turnpike House.)	Released: 13 June 2005; Label: Sanctuary; Format: CD	—	—	—
Surrey EP	Released: 28 October 2018; Label: Heavenly; Formats: Limited edition CD	—	—	—
"—" denotes a recording that did not chart or was not released in that territory.

== Singles ==
=== As lead artist ===
List of singles as lead artist, with selected chart positions, showing year released and album name
Title	Year	Peak chart positions									Album
Title	Year	UK	AUS	CAN	SCO	SWE	US	US Dance	US Dance Sales	US Alt.	Album
"Only Love Can Break Your Heart"	1990	39 (Note: "Only Love Can Break Your Heart" originally reached number 95 on the UK Singles Chart. It was re-released in August 1991 with "Filthy" as its B-side, reaching a new peak of number 39.)	155	—	—	—	97	1	4	11	Foxbase Alpha
"Kiss and Make Up"	1990	80	—	—	—	—	—	—	—	—	Foxbase Alpha
"Nothing Can Stop Us" / "Speedwell"	1991	54	—	—	—	—	—	1	15	—	Foxbase Alpha
"7 Ways to Love" (as Cola Boy)	1991	8	—	—	—	—	—	9	—	—	Non-album singles
"He Is Cola" (as Cola Boy)	1991	—	—	—	—	—	—	—	—	—	Non-album singles
"Join Our Club" / "People Get Real"	1992	21	—	—	—	—	—	—	—	—	Non-album singles
"Avenue"	1992	40	—	—	—	—	—	—	—	—	So Tough
"You're in a Bad Way"	1993	12	—	—	—	—	—	—	—	—	So Tough
"Hobart Paving" / "Who Do You Think You Are"	1993	23	—	—	—	—	—	5	36	—	So Tough
"I Was Born On Christmas Day"	1993	37	—	—	—	—	—	—	—	—	Non-album single
"Pale Movie"	1994	28	—	—	—	—	—	—	—	—	Tiger Bay
"Like a Motorway"	1994	47	—	—	43	—	—	—	—	—	Tiger Bay
"Hug My Soul"	1994	32	—	—	34	—	—	40	—	—	Tiger Bay
"Jungle Pulse" (with Étienne Daho; as St. Etienne Daho)	1995	—	—	—	—	—	—	—	—	—	Reserection
"He's on the Phone" (featuring Étienne Daho)	1995	11	—	—	9	41	—	33	—	—	Too Young to Die: Singles 1990–1995
"Sylvie"	1998	12	143	—	7	—	—	—	—	—	Good Humor
"The Bad Photographer"	1998	27	—	—	24	—	—	—	—	—	Good Humor
"Lover Plays the Bass"	1999	—	—	—	—	—	—	—	—	—	Non-album single
"52 Pilot"	1999	—	—	—	—	—	—	—	—	—	Places to Visit
"Saturday"	1999	—	—	—	—	—	—	—	—	—	The Misadventures of Saint Etienne
"How We Used to Live"	2000	155 (Note: "How We Used to Live" was released as a five-track CD single, which was ineligible to chart in the UK. The peak position of number 155 refers to the eligible three-track 12-inch single.)	—	—	—	—	—	—	—	—	Sound of Water
"Heart Failed (In the Back of a Taxi)"	2000	50	138	—	57	—	—	—	—	—	Sound of Water
"Boy Is Crying"	2001	34	—	—	42	—	—	—	—	—	Sound of Water
"Action"	2002	41	68	28	53	—	—	—	—	—	Finisterre
"Shower Scene"	2002	—	—	—	—	—	—	—	—	—	Finisterre
"Soft Like Me"	2003	40	—	—	53	—	—	—	—	—	Finisterre
"Side Streets"	2005	36	—	—	—	—	—	—	—	—	Tales from Turnpike House
"A Good Thing"	2005	70	—	—	61	—	—	—	—	—	Tales from Turnpike House
"Stars Above Us"	2006	—	—	—	—	—	—	6	—	—	Tales from Turnpike House
"Burnt Out Car"	2008	167	—	—	19	—	—	—	—	—	London Conversations: The Best of Saint Etienne
"Method of Modern Love"	2009	56	—	—	3	—	—	—	—	—	London Conversations: The Best of Saint Etienne
"Tonight"	2012	—	—	—	—	—	—	—	—	—	Words and Music by Saint Etienne
"I've Got Your Music"	2012	—	—	—	—	—	—	—	—	—	Words and Music by Saint Etienne
"Magpie Eyes"	2017	—	—	—	—	—	—	—	—	—	Home Counties
"Dive"	2017	— (Note: "Dive" did not enter the top 100 UK Singles Chart, but peaked at number one on the UK Vinyl Singles Chart.)	—	—	—	—	—	—	—	—	Home Counties
"Half Light"	2024	—	—	—	—	—	—	—	—	—	The Night
"Glad"	2025	—	—	—	—	—	—	—	—	—	International
"Take Me to the Pilot"	2025	—	—	—	—	—	—	—	—	—	International
"Brand New Me" (with Confidence Man)	2025	— (Note: "Brand New Me" did not enter the top 100 UK Singles Chart, but peaked at number four on the UK Vinyl Singles Chart.)	—	—	—	—	—	—	—	—	International
"—" denotes a recording that did not chart or was not released in that territory.

=== As featured artist ===
List of singles as featured artist, with selected chart positions, showing year released and album name
Title	Year	Peak chart positions								Album
Title	Year	UK	AUS	GER	FIN	IRE	SCO	SWI	US Dance Sales	Album
"Tell Me Why (The Riddle)" (Paul van Dyk featuring Saint Etienne)	2000	7	57	45	15	19	5	82	11	Out There and Back

=== Promotional singles ===
List of promotional singles, showing year released and album name
Title	Year	Album
"Filthy" (featuring Q-Tee)	1991	Non-album single
"Cool Kids of Death"	1995	Tiger Bay
"Angel" / "Burnt Out Car"	1996	Casino Classics
"Lose That Girl"	1998	Good Humor
"This Is Tomorrow"	2007	Non-album singles
"Pocket Call"	2014	Non-album singles
"Heather"	2017	Home Counties
"Camel Coat (Browning Version)" / "Little Chef"	2018	Non-album singles
"Saturday Boy"	2019	Non-album singles

== Other charted songs ==
List of other charted songs, with selected chart positions, showing year released and album name
Title	Year	Peaks	Album
Title	Year	UK	Album
"I Was Born on Christmas Day" (featuring Tim Burgess)	1993	37	"Xmas 93" (single)

== Fan club releases ==
=== Albums ===
Title	Details	Notes
I Love to Paint	Released: February 1995; Label: Heavenly; Format: CD	Contains material from 1990 to 1995.
Built on Sand	Released: December 1999; Label: Mantra; Format: CD	Contains material from 1994 to 1999.
Asleep at the Wheels of Steel: Music for Lost and Other Films by Saint Etienne	Released: February 2002; Label: Mantra; Format: CD	Tracks 1–3 are from the soundtrack to a low-budget, never-released feature film titled Lost. Tracks 5–7 are from the specially composed "Hawkline Suite", a musical representation of The Hawkline Monster: A Gothic Western.
Nice Price!	Released: 28 March 2006; Label: Foreign Office; Format: CD	Contains demos and alternative versions of previously released tracks.
What Have You Done Today Mervyn Day?	Released: 27 November 2006; Label: Foreign Office; Format: CD	Soundtrack, later given a very limited, full-scale release.
Boxette	Released: January 2008; Label: Foreign Office; Format: 4xCD	Four-disc box set containing previous fan club-only releases: I Love to Paint, Built on Sand and Asleep at the Wheels of Steel. The fourth disc, Eric Random, contains songs released on various fan club EPs as well as five previously unreleased tracks.
A Glimpse of Stocking	Released: November 2010; Label: Foreign Office; Formats: CD, LP, digital download	Christmas compilation, including songs from all previous fan club-only Christmas releases, as well as seven new songs. The CD was only available from the band's online shop and was sent to purchasers by the end of November 2010. There is a special edition including a bonus disc containing an exclusive personalised track featuring the purchaser's name and location in the lyrics.
The Character of Saint Etienne	Released: December 2022; Label: Foreign Office; Formats: LP, digital download	A collection of 12 hot dishes and cold cuts from late period Saint Etienne. Some were one-off projects, others are gems that were ruthlessly tossed aside for reasons no one can quite remember.

=== Extended plays ===
Title	Year	Notes
Now 4	2009	Homemade and hand-numbered CD-R. Only 72 copies were produced by Bob Stanley to thank the fans who helped him complete his Now That's What I Call Music! record collection. Includes "Gotta Jump", "Back to '95", "Like a Motorway" (Japanese version) and "Soft Like Me" (Li Dixon Red Corner Mix).
Trumpton Comes Alive	2009	Distributed as MP3 files via the band's email newsletter. Contains "Lose That Girl" (Wintercase Festival, Barcelona, 2002), "How We Used to Live" (La Route du Rock, Brittany, 2000) and "Like a Motorway" (Royal Festival Hall, Acoustic Test Concert, London, 2007).
Xmas '11 EP	2011	Limited-edition seven-inch vinyl, including "Santa's False Teeth" and three songs from A Glimpse of Stocking ("No Cure for the Common Christmas", "Unwrap Me" and "Welcome Home"). A CD version of the EP was given away to attendees of the band's Christmas party at Bethnal Green Working Men's Club in London on 10 December 2011.
Barbican 13 Sep 14	2016	Limited-edition CD, recorded live at the Barbican Centre in London on 13 September 2014 and given away at the band's 2016 Christmas parties (15 December in Saltaire, 19 December in London). Includes "Gently" (Spandau Ballet cover), "Slightly Drunk" (Squeeze cover), "Carrie Anne" and "Terribly Sorry".
Surrey North EP	2018	Limited-edition CD. Packaged in a cardboard slipcase. Limited to approx. 200 copies. Given away free to attendees of either Saint Etienne Christmas Party 2018. Includes "Pump Pail North", "Tab House", "All Nite Turtles" and "Pump Pail South".

=== Singles ===
Title	Year	Notes
"Xmas 95"	1995	CD single, including "A Christmas Gift to You", "Driving Home for Christmas" (Chris Rea cover) and "Message in a Bottle".
"Valentines Day '97"	1997	CD single, including "Southern Train", "A Slavic Beauty with a Rose Between Her Teeth", "Departure Lounge" and "Puppy Love" (Paul Anka cover).
"Xmas 98"	1998	CD single, including "I Don't Intend to Spend Christmas Without You" (Claudine Longet cover) and "Kofi Annan".
"Xmas 2003"	2003	CD single, initially given away at Xmas '03 gigs, then given away to fan club members in 2004. Includes "Come On Christmas", "Snow" (Randy Newman cover) and "Marcie Dreams of Deptford".
"Merry Xmas 2006 from Saint Etienne"	2006	CD single, given away at the Saint Etienne Xmas Party Turntable Cafe on 21 December 2006. Includes "21st Century Christmas" (Cliff Richard cover) and "Through the Winter".
"Re-issue Roustabout"	2010	Limited-edition CD single, given away for free at the band's Re-issue Roustabout event at St Aloysius Church Hall on 8 October 2010. Includes "Milk Bottle Symphony" (early version) and "Crying All the Way to the Terminal".
"After the Rain"	2021	CD single, sent out as a compensation to buyers who had received their copies of More Words And Music By Saint Etienne without printed inner sleeve and download code due to an error at the pressing plant.

== Guest appearances ==
List of non-single guest appearances, showing year released and album name
Title	Year	Album
"Stranger in Paradise"	1992	Ruby Trax
"Fake '88"	1993	Volume Six
"Stormtrooper in Drag"	1997	Random
"Please"	1997	Mojo: Original Soundtrack
"Constantly"	1997	Mojo: Original Soundtrack
"La La La"	1998	A Song for Eurotrash
"Chaos in the Gym"	1998	Warp Back to Earth 66/99
"La Poupée qui fait non"	1999	A Tribute to Polnareff
"Stevie"	2000	Caroline Now!: The Songs of Brian Wilson and the Beach Boys
"Got It Together Again" (featuring Nathan Bennett)	2002	Total Lee! The Songs of Lee Hazlewood
"There There My Brigadier"	2003	Resistance Is Futile: Doctor Who Remixed
"Manhattan"	2009	Music Inspired by the Film Scott Walker: 30 Century Man
"Steeplechase"	2012	It's the Taking Part That Counts: A Global Pop Sportsday
"Just Friends"	2012	Back to Back to Black

== Remixes ==
List of remixes by Saint Etienne for other artists, showing year released
Title	Year	Artist
"It's On" (The Posh Facker Mix by Saint Etienne)	1990	Flowered Up
"Pretty Face" (Remix)	1992	Sensuround
"Fantastique" (Remix)	1993	Oval
"Babacool"	1993	Golden
"Rodney King" (St Etienne Remix)	1993	The Boo Radleys
"Peace Music" (Pease Pottage Mix)	1993	Pizzicato Five
"Lazarus" (St. Etienne Remix)	1994	The Boo Radleys
"Out of This World (I Hear a New World)" (Remixed by St. Etienne)	1994	Edwyn Collins
"Welcome to California" (Saint Etienne Snax Dub)	1994	Katmandu
"Great Blondino" (Coco Walsh Mix)	1995	Stakka Bo
"Life's Too Long" (Flash vs Tarkus)	1996	Earl Brutus
"Bluebeard" (Buddy Mikro Mix)	1996	Combustible Edison
"Catwalk" (St. Etienne Remix)	1996	Pizzicato Five
"Love's Theme" (Saint Etienne Mix)	1997	Pizzicato Five
"David Hamilton" (St. Etienne Remix)	1998	Kahimi Karie
"Love Me Sweet" (Saint Etienne Remix)	1999	Kid Loco
"Cry Baby" (Trail of Tears Mix)	1999	Cocott
"F32" (Saint Etienne Mix)	1999	Fugu
"Borough of Kings" (Four Bagger Mix – Saint Etienne)	2000	Bridge & Tunnel
"Bakerloo" (Skindo Nagasaki Mix)	2001	King of Woolworths
"Loneliness Is a Warm Gum" (Saint Etienne's Romantic and Telescopic Mix)	2001	Helena Noguerra
"There by the Grace of God" (Saint Etienne Mix)	2002	Manic Street Preachers
"Yardbird Suite" (Over, Under, Sideways, Down Treatment by Saint Etienne)	2006	Herbie Mann
"3 Little Words" (St Etienne Remix)	2009	Frankmusik
"Jackie Collins Existential Question Time" (Saint Etienne Remix)	2009	Manic Street Preachers
"Higher Than the Stars" (Saint Etienne Visits Lord Spank Remix)	2009	The Pains of Being Pure at Heart
"Forever and Ever Amen" (Saint Etienne Remix)	2010	The Drums
"An Old Photo of Your New Lover" (Saint Etienne Remix)	2011	The One AM Radio
"Do You Like My New Hair" (Saint Etienne Pre-Mix)	2011	The Pre New
"Work" (St Etienne Remix)	2012	The 2 Bears
"Good Morning" (St. Etienne Mix)	2012	The Time & Space Machine
"Summersend" (Saint Etienne Mix)	2012	Graingerboy
"Walk On By" (St Etienne Remix)	2012	El Perro del Mar
"Think/Feel" (St. Etienne Remix)	2012	Beat Connection
"Memories" (Saint Etienne Remix)	2013	Boat Club
"Trampoline" (Saint Etienne Remix)	2017	Kero Kero Bonito
