= London Conversations: The Best of Saint Etienne =

Greatest hits album by Saint Etienne
- Released: 16 February 2009
- Recorded: 1990–2009
- Genre: Indie pop; house; synth-pop; electronic; trip hop
- Length: 151:21
- Label: Heavenly
- Producer: Saint Etienne; various

Saint Etienne chronology
Boxette (2008)	London Conversations: The Best of Saint Etienne (2009)	A Glimpse of Stocking (2010)

Singles from London Conversations: The Best of Saint Etienne
- 1. "Burnt Out Car" Released: 22 September 2008; 2. "Method of Modern Love" Released: 9 February 2009

Professional ratings
Review scores
Source	Rating
AllMusic	4/5 stars
BBC	Favourable
Drowned in Sound	8/10
The Guardian	4/5 stars
Pitchfork	8.8/10

London Conversations: The Best of Saint Etienne is a compilation album by the English electronic music group Saint Etienne. It was released as a single CD, a 2-CD set, a deluxe 2CD/DVD set (packaged in a hardback book), and a 2LP vinyl set. It features the 2008 Xenomania Mix of "Burnt Out Car", the Richard X mix of "This Is Tomorrow" and "Method of Modern Love". The compilation features a selection of their regular A-sides on the first disc, while disc two includes various further A-sides, B-sides, non-singles and album tracks.

Originally due for release in November 2008 following the re-release of "Burnt Out Car", the set was delayed several times as a result of manufacturing issues as well as the introductory single's low chart position. In addition, a planned single-disc edition (featuring only the first disc of the set) was cancelled. The set ultimately came out in February 2009 following the release of the newly recorded Richard X collaboration "Method of Modern Love". Some early-run copies of the 2CD edition are available, though, omitting "Method of Modern Love". The single-disc edition was eventually issued alongside remastered single-disc editions the rest of the band's catalogue in 2011, following the release of deluxe editions of most of their albums.

In its week of release the compilation charted at number 79 in the UK, missing out on the top 75 in part due to a surge in older albums following that year's Brit Awards.

== Track listing ==
=== CD ===
Standard edition (HVNLP69CD) / Deluxe edition CD1 (HVNLP69CDDE / HVNLP69CDSE)
No.	Title	Writer(s)	Original album	Length
1.	"Only Love Can Break Your Heart" (feat. Moira Lambert)	Neil Young	Foxbase Alpha, 1991	4:32
2.	"Nothing Can Stop Us"	Bob Stanley; Pete Wiggs	Foxbase Alpha	4:22
3.	"Join Our Club" (2001 remix)	Stanley; Wiggs	So Tough (US edition), 1993 (Note: 2001 remix first appeared on Smash the System: Singles and More, 2001.)	3:18
4.	"Avenue" (radio edit)	Ian Catt; Sarah Cracknell; Stanley; Wiggs	So Tough (Note: First album appearance of the radio edit was Smash the System: Singles 1990–99, 2005.)	3:50
5.	"You're in a Bad Way" (single version)	Cracknell; Stanley; Wiggs	So Tough (Note: First album appearance of the single version was Too Young to Die.)	3:03
6.	"Hobart Paving" (single version)	Stanley; Wiggs	So Tough	4:50
7.	"Who Do You Think You Are"	Des Dyer; Clive Scott	You Need a Mess of Help to Stand Alone, 1993 (Note: First released as a non-album single, 1993.)	3:50
8.	"Pale Movie"	Cracknell; Stanley; Wiggs	Tiger Bay, 1994	3:46
9.	"Like a Motorway" (radio edit)	Stanley; Wiggs	Tiger Bay	3:43
10.	"Hug My Soul" (radio edit)	Guy Batson; Cracknell; Johnny Male	Tiger Bay	3:55
11.	"He's on the Phone" (radio edit – feat. Étienne Daho)	Cracknell; Daho; Stanley; Wiggs	Too Young to Die, 1995 (Note: First album appearance of the radio edit was Smash the System: Singles and More.)	4:09
12.	"Sylvie" (single version)	Cracknell; Stanley; Wiggs	Good Humor, 1998	4:02
13.	"Heart Failed (In the Back of a Taxi)"	Cracknell; Stanley; Wiggs	Sound of Water, 2000	3:39
14.	"Action" (radio edit)	Cracknell; Stanley; Wiggs; Brian Higgins; Tim Powell; Nick Coler	Finisterre, 2002 (Note: First album appearance of the radio edit.)	3:51
15.	"A Good Thing"	Cracknell; Lawrence Oakley; Mark Waterfield	Tales from Turnpike House, 2005	4:02
16.	"Side Streets"	Cracknell; Stanley; Wiggs	Tales from Turnpike House	2:57
17.	"Burnt Out Car" (Xenomania mix)	Stanley; Wiggs	Continental, 1997 (Note: First album appearance of the Xenomania remix.)	3:41
18.	"Method of Modern Love (Note: Omitted from some 2CD editions.)"	Hannah Robinson; Richard X; Matt Prime	New recording	4:20
19.	"This Is Tomorrow" (Richard X version)	Annie; Cracknell; Stanley; Wiggs	New recording	3:28

Deluxe edition CD2
No.	Title	Writer(s)	Original album	Length
1.	"Kiss and Make Up" (US version)	Bobby Wratten; Michael Hiscock	Foxbase Alpha (US edition, 1992)	5:14
2.	"Filthy" (feat. Q-Tee)	Stanley; Wiggs; Tatiana Mais	You Need a Mess of Help to Stand Alone (Note: First released as the B-side of "Only Love Can Break Your Heart", 1990.)	5:35
3.	"Spring"	Stanley; Wiggs	Foxbase Alpha	3:44
4.	"People Get Real"	Stanley; Wiggs	Foxbase Alpha (US edition) (Note: First released as a non-album single; first UK album appearance was You Need a Mess of Help to Stand Alone.)	4:45
5.	"Mario's Cafe"	Stanley; Wiggs	So Tough	4:31
6.	"Goodnight Jack"	Cracknell; Stanley; Wiggs	Good Humor	4:22
7.	"The Bad Photographer"	Cracknell; Stanley; Wiggs	Good Humor	4:00
8.	"Lose That Girl"	Cracknell; Stanley; Wiggs	Good Humor	4:05
9.	"Lover Plays the Bass"	Stanley; Wiggs	Non-album single, 1999 (Note: Later included on reissues of Continental.)	4:16
10.	"How We Used to Live"	Cracknell; Stanley; Wiggs	Sound of Water	8:51
11.	"Boy Is Crying" (single mix)	Cracknell; Stanley; Wiggs	Sound of Water	3:39
12.	"Finisterre" (edit)	Cracknell; Stanley; Wiggs	Finisterre	3:45
13.	"Soft Like Me" (feat. Wildflower)	Cracknell; Stanley; Wiggs; Vanessa George	Finisterre	4:26
14.	"Shower Scene"	Cracknell; Stanley; Wiggs; Higgins; Powell; Coler	Finisterre	4:22
15.	"Stars Above Us"	Cracknell; Stanley; Wiggs; Xenomania	Tales from Turnpike House	3:26
16.	"Teenage Winter"	Cracknell; Stanley; Wiggs	Tales from Turnpike House	5:53
17.	"I Was Born on Christmas Day" (feat. Tim Burgess)	Catt; Stanley; Wiggs	Xmas 93 EP, 1993 (Note: First album appearance was Too Young to Die; later included on A Glimpse of Stocking.)	3:11

=== DVD ===
DVD (HVNLP69CDSE)
No.	Title	Director(s)	Length
1.	"Only Love Can Break Your Heart" (feat. Moira Lambert – original b&w version)	David Lodge; Nick Bray
2.	"Kiss and Make Up" (feat. Donna Savage)	Marquis Films
3.	"Nothing Can Stop Us"	Hiro Nakano
4.	"Avenue"	Paul Kelly
5.	"You're in a Bad Way"	Paul Kelly
6.	"Hobart Paving"	Kelly
7.	"Who Do You Think You Are"	Kelly
8.	"I Was Born on Christmas Day" (feat. Tim Burgess)	James Fry
9.	"Pale Movie"	Fry
10.	"Like a Motorway"	Kelly
11.	"Hug My Soul"	Paul Wells
12.	"He's on the Phone" (feat. Étienne Daho)	Kelly
13.	"Sylvie"	Bjorn Lindgren
14.	"The Bad Photographer"	Lindgren
15.	"How We Used to Live"	Mikey Tomkins
16.	"Heart Failed (In the Back of a Taxi)"	Tomkins
17.	"Action"	Kieran Evans; Kelly
18.	"Side Streets"	Kelly

=== LP ===
Side one (HVNLP69)
No.	Title	Length
1.	"Only Love Can Break Your Heart" (feat. Moira Lambert)	4:32
2.	"Nothing Can Stop Us"	4:22
3.	"Join Our Club" (2001 remix)	3:18
4.	"Avenue" (radio edit)	3:50

Side two
No.	Title	Length
5.	"You're in a Bad Way" (single version)	3:03
6.	"Hobart Paving" (single version)	4:50
7.	"Who Do You Think You Are"	3:50
8.	"Pale Movie"	3:46
9.	"Like a Motorway" (radio edit)	3:43
10.	"Hug My Soul" (radio edit)	3:55

Side three
No.	Title	Length
11.	"He's on the Phone" (radio edit – feat. Étienne Daho)	4:09
12.	"Sylvie" (single version)	4:02
13.	"Heart Failed (In The Back of a Taxi)"	3:39
14.	"Action" (radio edit)	3:51

Side four
No.	Title	Length
15.	"A Good Thing"	4:02
16.	"Side Streets"	2:57
17.	"Burnt Out Car" (Xenomania mix)	3:41
18.	"This Is Tomorrow" (Richard X version)	3:28

== B-sides ==
from "Burnt Out Car"

- "River"
- "Night Vision"
- "Destroy The Building"
- "Burnt Out Car" (Mark Brown remix edit)
- "Burnt Out Car" (Mark Brown remix)
- "Burnt Out Car" (demo)

from "Method of Modern Love"

- "Method of Modern Love" (radio edit)
- "This Is Tomorrow" (original version)
- "Method of Modern Love" (Cola Boy remix)
- "Method of Modern Love" (Richard X Join Our Clique mix)
- "Method of Modern Love" (a cappella version)
- "Method of Modern Love" (Heartbreaks remix)

== Charts ==
Chart performance for London Conversations: The Best of Saint Etienne
Chart (2009)	Peak position
Scottish Albums (OCC)	96
UK Albums (OCC)	79
