= Casino Classics =

Remix album by Saint Etienne
- Released: 1996
- Recorded: 1990–1996
- Genre: House; indie pop; electronica
- Length: 125:47
- Label: Heavenly
- Producer: Saint Etienne

Saint Etienne chronology
Too Young to Die – Singles 1990–1995 (1995)	Casino Classics (1996)	Continental (1997)

Professional ratings
Review scores
Source	Rating
AllMusic	link
Muzik	3/5 stars

Casino Classics is a multi-disc remix compilation album by Saint Etienne. The first CD collects many of the remixes featured as B-sides on the band's singles from 1990 to 1995. The second contains rarer remixes (such as Underworld's remix of "Cool Kids of Death") and newly commissioned remixes. Disc one was originally a bonus CD released with limited copies of Too Young to Die – The Singles. Disc two features three previously unavailable songs. Early copies came in a card slipcase with a round sticker. An expanded, four-disc version of the compilation was released in 2012 with a revised running order. The band also released a fifth disc as a download-only extra.

The release is notable for collecting remixes in a variety of styles by many major artists, some of whom were then at early stages in their careers, including The Chemical Brothers, Aphex Twin, Andrew Weatherall, David Holmes (with Jagz Kooner) and Death in Vegas.

Some of the tracks on Casino Classics are remixes of songs that had not actually been released in their original form. "The Sea" (here called "Down by the Sea") and "Sometimes in Winter" would later be released in their original forms on the Japan-only album Continental the following year. "Angel" and "Burnt Out Car" did not appear in their original versions until the fan club compilation Nice Price, released in 2006.

Promotional CDs preceded the album's release. "Angel" (Way Out West mix) and "Burnt Out Car" (Balearico mix), were released as a double A-side. "Burnt Out Car" was later included on greatest hits releases, including Smash the System: Singles 1990–99.

== Track listings ==
=== CD: Heavenly / HVN LP 16 CD ===
CD One
No.	Title	Writer(s)	Remixer	Length
1.	"Like a Motorway" (Chekhov Warp Dub)	Stanley, Wiggs	The Chemical Brothers	9:11
2.	"Join Our Club" (Chemically Friendly Zoom Mix)	Stanley, Wiggs	Billy Nasty	6:42
3.	"Pale Movie" (Secret Knowledge Trouser Assassin Mix)	Cracknell, Stanley, Wiggs	Secret Knowledge	10:12
4.	"Speedwell" (Flying Mix)	Stanley, Wiggs	The Aloof	6:08
5.	"Only Love Can Break Your Heart" (A Mix of Two Halves) (Featuring Moira Lambert)	Young	Andrew Weatherall	8:48
6.	"Who Do You Think You Are" (Quex-Rd)	Dyer, Scott	Aphex Twin	8:04
7.	"Avenue" (Variety Club Mix)	Catt, Cracknell, Stanley, Wiggs	Gordon King	6:20
8.	"Hug My Soul" (Sure Is Pure Kodacolor House Mix)	Batson, Cracknell, Male	Sure Is Pure	8:41
9.	"Like a Motorway" (David Holmes Mix)	Stanley, Wiggs	David Holmes	12:59

CD Two
No.	Title	Writer(s)	Remixer	Length
1.	"Angel" (Way Out West Mix)	Stanley, Wiggs	Way Out West	6:35
2.	"Filthy" (Monkey Mafia Mix) (Featuring Q-Tee)	Mais, Stanley, Wiggs	Monkey Mafia	5:54
3.	"People Get Real" (Death in Vegas Mix)	Stanley, Wiggs	Death in Vegas	7:20
4.	"Nothing Can Stop Us" (Lionrock Mix)	Stanley, Wiggs	Lionrock	5:45
5.	"Sometimes in Winter" (Psychonauts Mix)	Stanley, Wiggs	Psychonauts	4:17
6.	"The Sea" (PFM Mix)	Stanley, Wiggs	PFM	9:35
7.	"Burnt Out Car" (Balearico Mix)	Stanley, Wiggs	Balearico	4:18
8.	"He's on the Phone" (Naked Bungee Dub) (Featuring Etienne Daho)	Cracknell, Daho, Stanley, Wiggs	Primax	6:01
9.	"Cool Kids of Death" (Underworld Mix)	Stanley, Wiggs	Underworld	14:30
10.	"Angel" (Broadcast Mix)	Stanley, Wiggs	Broadcast	4:17

- The CD sleeve does not list the titles of the mixes as given on their original release but instead simply credits each to the remixer. The original titles are listed here.

=== LP: Heavenly / HVN LP 16 ===
Disc one
No.	Title	Writer(s)	Remixer	Length
1.	"Angel" (Way Out West Mix)	Stanley, Wiggs	Way Out West	6:35
2.	"Nothing Can Stop Us" (Lionrock Mix)	Stanley, Wiggs	Lionrock	5:45
3.	"The Sea" (PFM Mix)	Stanley, Wiggs	PFM	9:35
4.	"Filthy" (Monkey Mafia Mix) (Featuring Q-Tee)	Mais, Stanley, Wiggs	Monkey Mafia	5:54
5.	"Like a Motorway" (Chekhov Warp Dub)	Stanley, Wiggs	The Chemical Brothers	9:11
6.	"Only Love Can Break Your Heart" (A Mix of Two Halves) (Featuring Moira Lambert)	Young	Andrew Weatherall	8:48

Disc two
No.	Title	Writer(s)	Remixer	Length
1.	"Hug My Soul" (Sure Is Pure Kodacolor House Mix)	Batson, Cracknell, Male	Sure Is Pure	8:41
2.	"Burnt Out Car" (Balearico Mix)	Stanley, Wiggs	Balearico	4:18
3.	"He's on the Phone" (Bungee Vocal Mix) (Featuring Etienne Daho)	Cracknell, Daho, Stanley, Wiggs	Primax	6:01
4.	"Sometimes in Winter" (Psychonauts Mix)	Stanley, Wiggs	Psychonauts	4:17
5.	"Pale Movie" (Secret Knowledge Trouser Assassin Mix)	Cracknell, Stanley, Wiggs	Secret Knowledge	10:12
6.	"Like a Motorway" (David Holmes Mix)	Stanley, Wiggs	David Holmes	12:59

Disc three
No.	Title	Writer(s)	Remixer	Length
1.	"Speedwell" (Flying Mix)	Stanley, Wiggs	The Aloof	6:08
2.	"Cool Kids of Death" (Underworld Mix)	Stanley, Wiggs	Underworld	14:30
3.	"People Get Real" (Death in Vegas Mix)	Stanley, Wiggs	Death in Vegas	7:20
4.	"Angel" (Broadcast Mix)	Stanley, Wiggs	Broadcast	4:17
5.	"Who Do You Think You Are" (Quex-Rd)	Dyer, Scott	Aphex Twin	8:04

=== CD: Heavenly / HVNLP 16CDRP1 ===
No.	Title	Writer(s)	Remixer	Length
1.	"Angel" (Way Out West Radio Edit)	Stanley, Wiggs	Way Out West	4:11
2.	"Burnt Out Car" (Balearico Mix)	Stanley, Wiggs	Balearico	4:18

- UK promo to promote Casino Classics. The disc was only available from the band's fan club.

=== CD: Heavenly / HVNLP16CDDEX ===
- Released in 2012 in 2xCD and 4xCD versions.
- On both versions, "Cool Kids of Death (Underworld Mix)" and "Hug My Soul (Sure Is Pure Mix)" were edited in order to fit on a regular CD.

CD one: 1990-1994
No.	Title	Remixer	Length
1.	"Only Love Can Break Your Heart" (A Mix of Two Halves)	Andrew Weatherall	9:01
2.	"Like A Motorway" (Chekhov Warp Dub)	The Chemical Brothers	9:11
3.	"Kiss And Make Up" (Midsummer Madness Mix)	Pete Heller	7:47
4.	"Speedwell" (Flying Mix)	The Aloof	5:55
5.	"Filthy" (Monkey Mafia Vocal Mix)	Monkey Mafia	5:54
6.	"Only Love Can Break Your Heart" (Masters at Work Dub)	Masters at Work	7:39
7.	"Avenue" (Variety Club Mix)	Gordon King, The "Natural" Pete Smith	6:21
8.	"Who Do You Think You Are" (Quex-Rd)	Aphex Twin	8:05
9.	"Cool Kids of Death" (Underworld Mix Edit)	Underworld	10:27
10.	"Hug My Soul" (Sure Is Pure – Kodacolour House Mix Edit)	Sure is Pure	8:01
Total length:			78:38

CD two: 1994-2009
No.	Title	Remixer	Length
1.	"Like A Motorway" (The David Holmes Mix)	David Holmes	12:58
2.	"He's on the Phone" (Motiv 8 Mix)	Motiv 8	6:26
3.	"The Sea" (PFM Mix)	PFM	4:50
4.	"Angel" (Broadcast Mix)	Broadcast	4:18
5.	"Sylvie" (Faze Action Friday Night Boiler Mix)	Faze Action	10:06
6.	"How We Used To Live" (Paul Van Dyk Mix)	Paul Van Dyk	8:44
7.	"Boy Is Crying" (Hybrid Vocal Mix)	Hybrid	6:29
8.	"Action" (DJ Tiësto Mix)	DJ Tiësto	6:50
9.	"Heart Failed (In The Back of a Taxi)" (Two Lone Swordsmen Mix)	Two Lone Swordsmen	3:39
10.	"Burnt Out Car" (Mark Brown Remix Extended Mix)	Mark Brown	7:27
11.	"Method of Modern Love" (Richard X Join Our Clique Remix)	Richard X	6:00
Total length:			77:58

CD three: 1991-1996
No.	Title	Remixer	Length
1.	"Nothing Can Stop Us" (Masters at Work Dub)	Masters at Work	5:14
2.	"People Get Real" (Death in Vegas Mix)	Death in Vegas	7:20
3.	"Nothing Can Stop Us" (Lionrock Mix)	Lionrock	5:45
4.	"Join Our Club" (Chemically Friendly Zoom Mix)	Billy Nasty	6:42
5.	"Who Do You Think You Are" (Strobelights & Platform Shoes Mix)	Roger Sanchez	6:59
6.	"Your Head My Voice" (Voix Revirement)	Aphex Twin	4:11
7.	"Like A Motorway" (Skin Up, You're Already Dead)	Autechre	8:22
8.	"Pale Movie" (Secret Knowledge Trouser Assassin Mix)	Secret Knowledge	10:12
9.	"Sometimes in Winter" (Psychonauts Mix)	The Psychonauts	9:00
10.	"He's on the Phone" (Bungee Dub Mix)	Primax	6:01
11.	"Angel" (Way Out West Mix)	Way Out West	6:37
Total length:			76:43

CD four: 1996-2009
No.	Title	Remixer	Length
1.	"Burnt Out Car" (Balearico Mix)	Balearico	4:18
2.	"Sylvie" (Trouser Enthusiasts' Tintinnabulation Mix)	Trouser Enthusiasts	8:04
3.	"4.35 in the Morning" (Talkin' Blues Mix)	Kid Loco	4:37
4.	"Foto Stat" (Bronx Dogs Mix)	Bronx Dogs	7:19
5.	"Uri Geller Bent My Boyfriend" (Add N To X Mix)	Add N to (X)	6:08
6.	"Lose That Girl" (Trouser Enthusiasts' Brides in the Bath Mix)	Trouser Enthusiasts	8:14
7.	"How We Used To Live" (Aim Mix)	Aim	4:27
8.	"Heart Failed (In The Back of a Taxi)" (Bridge And Tunnel Mix (All Is Not Well For Otto And Ulli))	Bridge And Tunnel	5:44
9.	"Northwestern" (Si Cut DB Mix)	Douglas Benford	5:40
10.	"Action" (Laub Mix)	Laub	4:27
11.	"Soft Like Me" (K.O.W. Radiophonic Rework)	King of Woolworths	5:40
12.	"Method of Modern Love" (Cola Boy Mix)	Cola Boy	6:38
Total length:			71:31

Bonus Downloads
No.	Title	Remixer	Length
1.	"Only Love Can Break Your Heart" (Kenlou B-Boy Mix)	Masters at Work	6:55
2.	"Join Our Club" (Le Hammond Inferno Remix)	Le Hammond Inferno	5:30
3.	"Avenue" (Martial Mix)	A.R. Kane	6:30
4.	"Hug My Soul" (Motiv-8 Blackpool Mix)	Motiv-8	6:42
5.	"Sylvie" (Stretch 'n' Vern Mix)	Stretch 'n' Vern	9:12
6.	"Mr Donut" (Melody Belleville Mix)	Kid Loco	4:52
7.	"Saturday" (Fugu Mix)	Fugu	3:22
8.	"How We Used To Live" (Dot Allison Remix)	Dot Allison	5:57
9.	"Heart Failed (In The Back of a Taxi)" (Cardiac Vocal Mix)	Futureshock	8:54
10.	"Action" (DJ Tiesto Instrumental Mix)	DJ Tiësto	6:53
11.	"Soft Like Me" (Mr Joshua Mix)	Mr. Joshua	4:03
12.	"Stars Above Us" (Eric Kupper Radio Mix)	Eric Kupper	3:43
13.	"Burnt Out Car" (Xenomania Mix)	Xenomania	3:39
Total length:			76:14

== Charts ==
Chart performance for Casino Classics
Chart (1996)	Peak position
Scottish Albums (OCC)	45
UK Albums (OCC)	34
UK Independent Albums (OCC)	5
