= Finisterre (album) =

Studio album by Saint Etienne
- Released: 7 October 2002
- Recorded: 2002
- Genres: Electronic, ambient house, techno, alternative rock
- Length: 47:48
- Label: Mantra
- Producers: Saint Etienne, Mr Joshua, Ian Catt

Saint Etienne chronology
Asleep at the Wheels of Steel (2002)	Finisterre (2002)	Travel Edition 1990–2005 (2005)

Singles from Finisterre
- 1. "Action" Released: 26 August 2002; 2. "Shower Scene" Released: 2002; 3. "Soft Like Me" Released: 17 March 2003

Professional ratings
Aggregate scores
Source	Rating
Metacritic	73/100
Review scores
Source	Rating
AllMusic	3/5 stars
Robert Christgau	(2-star Honorable Mention)
Drowned in Sound	10/10
The Guardian	4/5 stars
Mojo	3.5/5 stars
Pitchfork	7.6/10; 7.7/10 (deluxe edition)
Q	4/5 stars
Rolling Stone	3/5 stars
Stylus Magazine	B
Uncut	4/5 stars

Finisterre is the sixth studio album by English alternative dance band Saint Etienne, released on 7 October 2002 by Mantra Records. A double-disc deluxe edition was released on 3 May 2010 by Heavenly Records.

== Background ==
Following two relatively uniform albums, Good Humor and Sound of Water, Finisterre contains a wide mixture of sounds and styles (as would its successor Tales from Turnpike House). The album returned to the inclusion of vocal interludes between songs as last heard on their album So Tough and a more angular, electronic sound, particularly on tracks such as "Action", "Shower Scene" and "New Thing". "Language Lab" and "Summerisle" recall the ambient style of Sound of Water, while "Stop and Think It Over" would not have been out of place on Good Humor or its predecessor, Tiger Bay.

The vocal interludes were supplied by Michael Jayston's narration as featured in the film released to accompany the album, also called Finisterre. The film was directed by Paul Kelly and Kieran Evans and was born out of visuals used to accompany certain tracks from the album shown during their live shows. The film debuted at a sold-out show in October 2002 at the Royal Festival Hall on London's Southbank, and was re-released to select screens in 2005. It is currently available on DVD. The album sleeve features a photograph of the East London tower block Ronan Point shortly after it collapsed in 1968 with the loss of four lives.

== Reception ==
Finisterre was met with "generally favorable" reviews from critics. At Metacritic, which assigns a weighted average rating out of 100 to reviews from mainstream publications, the release received an average score of 73, based on 13 reviews.

Nitsuh Abebe of Pitchfork scored the album 7.6 out of ten and wrote that "[t]he big comeback on Finisterre's part is that they're tugging those strings again, confidently", citing "B92" as a highlight. However, Abebe criticised "Action" and "New Thing" as "just begging for the bigger kick drums that would turn them into flat-out stompers."

== Track listing ==
All tracks are written by Sarah Cracknell, Bob Stanley and Pete Wiggs, except where noted.

No.	Title	Writer(s)	Length
1.	"Action"	Nick Coler, Cracknell, Higgins, Powell, Stanley, Wiggs	4:45
2.	"Amateur"		3:39
3.	"Language Lab"	Stanley, Wiggs	3:13
4.	"Soft Like Me"	Cracknell, George, Stanley, Wiggs	4:24
5.	"Summerisle"		3:08
6.	"Stop and Think It Over"		3:57
7.	"Shower Scene"	Coler, Cracknell, Higgins, Powell, Stanley, Wiggs	4:26
8.	"The Way We Live Now"	Stanley, Wiggs	4:29
9.	"New Thing"		4:11
10.	"B92"		3:23
11.	"The More You Know"		3:32
12.	"Finisterre"		4:33

2010 deluxe edition bonus disc
No.	Title	Writer(s)	Length
1.	"Primrose Hill"	Ian Catt, Stanley, Wiggs	2:14
2.	"Anderson Unbound"		3:45
3.	"Seven Summers"		5:05
4.	"Gimp Crisis"	Stanley, Wiggs	3:27
5.	"Abby I Hardly Knew You"		3:22
6.	"So Mystified"		3:00
7.	"White Dress"		2:16
8.	"Time and Tide"		4:01
9.	"Shock Corridor"		3:24
10.	"Stop and Think It Over" (Kid Loco Mix)		3:33
11.	"Mountain Rain"		3:50
12.	"Queen of Polythene"		3:09
13.	"Ballade de Saint Etienne"		3:55
14.	"Stevie"	Brian Wilson	3:03
15.	"Got It Together Again"	Lee Hazlewood	2:30
16.	"Fascination"	Cracknell, Oakley, Waterfield	3:51
17.	"There There My Brigadier"	Stanley, Wiggs	3:30

Previously unreleased tracks are "So Mystified", "White Dress", "Stop and Think It Over" (Kid Loco Mix). "There There My Brigadier" was never released commercially, but given away on a promotional single at a Doctor Who convention in 2003 for a later-abandoned album of Dr Who-related remixes.

== B-sides ==
from "Action"

- "Anderson Unbound"
- "7 Summers"
- "Action" (Mr Joshua Edit)
- "Action" (DJ Tiësto Remix)
- "Action" (Laub Remix)

from "Soft Like Me" / "Shower Scene"

- "Gimp Crisis"
- "Time and Tide"
- "Shock Corridor"
- "Soft Like Me" (Mr Joshua Mix)
- "Abby I Hardly Knew You"
- "Soft Like Me" (K.O.W. Radiophonic Rework)
- "New Thing"

== Charts ==
Chart performance for Finisterre
Chart (2002)	Peak position
German Albums (Offizielle Top 100)	92
Scottish Albums (Official Charts)	68
UK Albums (Official Charts)	55
UK Independent Albums (Official Charts)	4
US Independent Albums (Billboard)	44
US Top Dance Albums (Billboard)	11
