= East Village (band) =

English indie pop band (1986–1991)

- Origin: Princes Risborough, England
- Genres: Indie rock
- Years active: 1986–1991
- Labels: Sub Aqua, Heavenly Recordings
- Past members: Paul Kelly – guitar/vocals Johnny Wood – guitar/vocals Martin Kelly – bass/vocals Spencer Smith – drums

Formed in the mid-1980s by two brothers, Martin and Paul Kelly, East Village were an indie pop band from Princes Risborough, England.

Their music drew heavily on the influence of 1960s guitar bands such as the Byrds, the Beatles, and Buffalo Springfield and like those groups East Village also featured three songwriters / lead vocalists. Though the bands output troubled only the lower reaches of the UK indie charts they have gone on to earn cult status since their break up in the early 1990s.

== History ==
After a year or so as a garage band named Episode Four, the Kelly brothers were joined by Johnny Wood (guitar/vocals) in 1984 and Spencer Smith (drums) in 1985. During 1986 they recorded the Strike Up Matches EP released as a 500 only pressing on the Lenin and McCarthy imprint that year. The EP has gone on to become one of the most sought after releases of the C86 era.

By 1987, the band had renamed themselves East Village and relocated to London where they recorded two EPs for Jeff Barrett's Sub Aqua label, before it folded in 1989. They toured extensively including a support tour with The House of Love in autumn 1988 and two tours with McCarthy.

The collapse of Sub Aqua left the band without a deal, and they recorded their debut album using money donated by Bob Stanley, a friend of the band and an admirer of their work. The record was label-less for some time until Jeff Barrett (who was setting up the fledgling Heavenly Recordings) picked up on it and paid for its completion. A series of Heavenly label based gigs with Manic Street Preachers, Saint Etienne and Flowered Up ensued, followed by a new single, Circles, in 1991. The band played a sold-out show at the New Cross Venue in South London but ended the set by splitting up on stage.

The album, Drop Out (1993), was mixed and released posthumously on Heavenly. A collection of all the band's early singles (along with unreleased demos), Hot Rod Hotel, was released on the Australian label Summershine in 1994, giving the band a radio hit with Silver Train.

In 2006, Tokyo label Excellent released the first comprehensive collection of the band's recordings and the track 'Vibrato' appeared on the Sanctuary CD86 compilation. Prices of original East Village releases continued to rise and in 2013 Heavenly Recordings repressed Drop Out on vinyl. The re-issue received a rare 10/10 review in Uncut magazine who described the album as "Pop perfection...Drop Out is a true lost classic of its era".

== Current activity ==
Martin Kelly is MD of music publishing company Heavenly Songs and its sister company Heavenly Films.

Paul Kelly and Spencer Smith played in the Saint Etienne touring band during the 1990s before Paul Kelly split to form Birdie with ex-Dolly Mixture member Debsey Wykes.

Paul Kelly is a graphic designer, photographer and film maker (director of Finisterre, What Have You Done Today Mervyn Day, This Is Tomorrow, How We Used To Live, Lawrence Of Belgravia and Dexys: Nowhere Is Home). Spencer Smith worked alongside Jeff Barrett and Martin Kelly at Heavenly Recordings between 1994–2010. Johnny Wood released a solo album Quiet Storm on Excellent in 2006.

Martin and Paul published a book in June 2010 with friend Terry Foster entitled Fender: The Golden Age 1946–1970. A detailed study in pictures and text of the early history of Fender musical instruments. Published in London, New York, Paris (French language edition), Rome (Italian language edition) and Tokyo (Japanese language edition): Cassell ISBN 1-84403-666-9. In 2021 the Kelly brothers published a history of Rickenbacker musical instruments entitled Rickenbacker Guitars – Out of the Fryingpan Into the Firego via Phantom Books. The book was subsequently republished and retitled Rickenbacker – Pioneers of the Electric Guitar by Cassell in 2023 ISBN 978-1-78840-433-4.

== Discography ==
=== Singles ===
- "Cubans In The Bluefields" – 7" and 12" EP (Sub Aqua 1987)
- "Back Between Places" – 12" EP (Sub Aqua 1988)
- "Freeze Out" – 7" Flexidisc (Caff 1989)
- "Circles" – 12" (Heavenly 1991)
- "Vibrato" – 7" (Summershine 1991)
- "Silvertrain" – 7" and CD (Summershine 1993)
- "Black Autumn" – 7" (Excellent 2003)
- "Circles" – 7" (Heavenly 2013)
- "Cubans In The Bluefields" – 7" (Optic Nerve 2018)
- "Back Between Places" – 7" (Optic Nerve 2022)

=== Albums ===
- Drop Out – vinyl and CD (Heavenly, 1993)
- Drop Out – vinyl reissue (Excellent 2003)
- Drop Out – vinyl reissue (Heavenly 2013)
- Drop Out – vinyl and double CD reissue (Heavenly 2023)

=== Compilation albums ===
- Hot Rod Hotel – CD only (Summershine 1994)
- Drop Out – Deluxe Edition – 2 x CD (Excellent 2006)
- Hot Rod Hotel – vinyl (Slumberland 2020)
