= Martin Kelly (musician) =

British musician (born 1965)

Martin Kelly (born 17 July 1965) is a musician, music manager, record label boss, music publisher and author. Best known as Jeff Barrett's partner at Heavenly Recordings, a British independent record label run by the pair between 1993 and 2009.

== Early years ==
Kelly was born in RAF Akrotiri, Akrotiri and Dhekelia, Cyprus, the son of an RAF Squadron leader Michael "Manx" Kelly, who would later go on to form the Rothmans aerobatic display team.

The family relocated to the UK when his father was posted to Bomber Command in 1968, Kelly grew up near Princes Risborough in Buckinghamshire.

In 1983, aged 17, Kelly formed a new group Episode Four with his brother Paul Kelly, Johnny Wood and Spencer Smith. Episode Four managed only one EP release, the 1986 12" 'Strike Up Matches'.

== East Village ==
In late 1986 Episode Four crossed paths with Head Records boss and Creation Records PR man Jeff Barrett. Barrett wanted to sign the band to Head but suggested they came up with a new name first. The debut East Village single was recorded just as the Head label folded in 1987. Barrett then launched the new label imprint Sub Aqua and East Village released two EPs in 1987 and 1988. In 1989 the band began work on their debut album "Drop Out".

== Heavenly ==
During the later part of his time with East Village Kelly began working for Jeff Barrett at his independent press company Capersville, assisting with PR duties for a wide range of artists including the Happy Mondays, Primal Scream, New Order and My Bloody Valentine. During this time Barrett and Kelly became close friends and in 1990 Barrett hatched the idea for a new label Heavenly. Over the next 20 years Heavenly would launch the careers of Saint Etienne, Manic Street Preachers, Beth Orton, Ed Harcourt, Doves and The Magic Numbers. After a brief stint in 1992 when Kelly worked for Alan McGee at Creation Records, in 1993 Barrett asked him to become his partner at the label. At that time Kelly had begun managing one of the labels key acts, Saint Etienne, something he does to this day. In 1994 Kelly was involved in starting up The Heavenly Social club with Jeff Barrett, Robin Turner and Nick Dewey. Kelly is still a partner in The Social, a 7 days a week, nightclub and bar in central London. In 2009 Kelly switched his focus from recorded music to song publishing and set up Heavenly Songs Limited via Bucks Music in early 2010.

== Author ==
June 2010 saw the publication of Kelly's first book Fender: The Golden Age 1946–1970. Written by Kelly and Terry Foster, designed and photographed by his brother Paul, the book is a detailed account of the early years of Fender musical instruments, when the company still had connections with its creator Leo Fender. It has been published in several languages around the world. November 2021 saw the publication of Kelly's second book: Rickenbacker Guitars: From the Frying Pan into the Fireglo, written by Kelly and designed and photographed by his brother Paul, with a foreword by Ron O'Keefe. Kelly is currently researching a new book on the subject of Vox guitars manufactured during the 1960s.

== Heavenly Films ==
As manager of Saint Etienne, Kelly was involved in the production of three feature-length films made by the band and Paul Kelly between 2004 and 2008. The first Finisterre, a documentary about London (directed by Paul Kelly and Kieran Evans), was released to coincide with Saint Etienne's album of the same name and met with huge critical acclaim. What Have You Done Today, Mervyn Day? (2005) and This Is Tomorrow (2007) both directed by Paul Kelly further cemented the team's reputation for producing high quality documentaries. In autumn 2010 brothers Paul and Martin set up Heavenly Films Limited with Bob Stanley from Saint Etienne and Kieran Evans with the intention of producing a series of new documentary films.

== Personal life ==
Kelly married Sarah Cracknell of Saint Etienne in 2004.

== Selected discography ==
- East Village - Hot Rod Hotel 1994 LP
- East Village - Drop Out 1993 LP

== Selected filmography ==
- Finisterre 2002
- What Have You Done Today Mervyn Day? 2005
- Lawrence of Belgravia 2011
- How We Used To Live 2014
- "Dexys: Nowhere Is Home" 2014
