= Culture, Alienation, Boredom and Despair =

- Directed by: Kieran Evans; Robin Turner
- Release date: 21 October 2012 (Sŵn)

Culture, Alienation, Boredom and Despair is a 2012 documentary film about Welsh alternative rock band Manic Street Preachers's 1992 debut studio album, Generation Terrorists. It is co-directed by Kieran Evans and Robin Turner.
