= Music Again =

Music Again may refer to:

- "Music Again", a 2009 song by Adam Lambert from For Your Entertainment
- "Music Again", a 2021 song by Saint Etienne from I've Been Trying to Tell You
