= Tales from Turnpike House =

2005 studio album by Saint Etienne

Studio album by Saint Etienne
- Released: 13 June 2005
- Recorded: 2005
- Genre: Alternative dance; dream pop; synth-pop
- Length: 44:11
- Label: Sanctuary
- Producer: Ian Catt; Saint Etienne; Xenomania

Saint Etienne chronology
Travel Edition 1990–2005 (2004)	Tales from Turnpike House (2005)	Nice Price (2006)

Singles from Tales from Turnpike House
- 1. "Side Streets" Released: 6 June 2005; 2. "A Good Thing" Released: 31 October 2005; 3. "Stars Above Us" Released: 28 February 2006

Tales from Turnpike House is the seventh studio album by English alternative dance band Saint Etienne, released on 13 June 2005 by Sanctuary Records. It is a concept album in which the songs depict characters who all live in the eponymous block of flats in London.

== Setting ==
The exact setting of the stories told by the album's setting is somewhat amorphous. The real Turnpike House is a high-rise block of flats in Goswell Road, EC1, an area of ex-council blocks between Clerkenwell and Upper Street. The band had spent a lot of time in Turnpike House, as filmmaker Paul Kelly lived there during the period in which they were collaborating on What Have You Done Today, Mervyn Day?. However, Sarah Cracknell has said that the building imagined in the album is "not nearly as smart" as the real Turnpike House. Bob Stanley has said that he imagined the album's setting to be more suburban, "probably somewhere like Croydon or possibly Ponders End". Pete Wiggs has said that his experience of living in Croydon was the inspiration for "Side Streets" and "Slow Down at the Castle" (the Castle is a water tower in Park Hill Recreation Ground). However, the title of "The Birdman of EC1" refers to the postal district in which the real Turnpike House is located.

== Collaborations ==
The album features two tracks co-written and produced by Xenomania ("Lightning Strikes Twice" and "Stars Above Us") as well as a guest vocal from 1970s pop star David Essex on "Relocate" (Essex had earlier appeared on the Saint Etienne album So Tough via sampled dialogue from the 1973 film That'll Be the Day).

== Releases ==
Tales from Turnpike House was released on 13 June 2005 by Sanctuary Records and preceded by a single for "Side Streets" on 6 June 2005. In the United States, the album was released 24 January 2006 by Savoy Jazz. Initial pressings of the UK version included a bonus EP of children's music titled Up the Wooden Hills. The band felt that music for young children under seven was fed into unexceptional pop music, and wanted to make music that children and parents could enjoy together. Double-disc editions of the US release included instead the Savoy Nu Groove Sampler, containing six tracks from various Savoy Jazz releases, including "Side Streets" from the album itself.

As part of the reissue programme of all Saint Etienne's albums, Tales from Turnpike House was re-released in a deluxe double CD edition featuring unreleased material and sleeve notes by Jeremy Deller in October 2010.

== Critical reception ==
Professional ratings
Aggregate scores
Source	Rating
Metacritic	79/100
Review scores
Source	Rating
AllMusic	4.5/5 stars
The A.V. Club	A−
Entertainment Weekly	B+
The Guardian	5/5 stars
Los Angeles Times	3.5/4 stars
Pitchfork	7.8/10
Q	1.5/5 stars
Rolling Stone	3.5/5 stars
Slant Magazine	3.5/5 stars
Spin	B

Tales from Turnpike House was very well-received from critics, holding an aggregate 79 out of 100 from Metacritic based on 22 reviews. The album's most favourable reviews, including a five-star review from Dorian Lynskey of The Guardian, called it the group's best album yet, with praise going towards the album's songwriting, production, arrangements, sound, vocal harmonies and Sarah Cracknell's vocals. Ernesto Lechner wrote in his review for the Los Angeles Times that "If it's pop craftsmanship you are after, few can equal this melancholy concept album and the sheer virtuosity of its hooks", while Stylus Magazine's Edward Oculicz called it an "overwhelmingly forward, ambitious album for a group fifteen years into their career and long past their commercial prime who could have quite happily introduced no new ideas—musical or thematical—and not challenged their dwindling but loyal fan-base."

Allmusic journalist Andy Kellman called it the band's most organic release since their fourth album Good Humor, highlighting Turnpike's concept as allowing "for a range of material that's as broad as what can be heard on any other Saint Etienne album." Peter Relic of Rolling Stone, who also noted the variety of musical styles, called the record "an unabashedly joyful celebration of being British" that "could make an Anglophile out of anyone."

In a less positive review, Thomas Blatchford of Drowned in Sound called Tales from Turnpike House "A good enough record, but we know they can do better." He felt the harmonies were "over-egged" and not complementary to Cracknell's lead vocals, and described the concept as difficult to grasp it due to it being "too downbeat to be uplifting and too uplifting to be downbeat". However, a reviewer from Q was the most negative towards the album. He found Saint Etienne's brand of indie disco "dated" and bashed the lyrical content as "a concept album of kitchen-sink dramas about Tony The Milkman and Doris The Housewife".

== Track listing ==
All tracks are written by Sarah Cracknell, Bob Stanley and Pete Wiggs, except where noted.

UK edition
No.	Title	Writer(s)	Length
1.	"Sun in My Morning"		2:41
2.	"Milk Bottle Symphony"		4:03
3.	"Lightning Strikes Twice"	Cracknell, Stanley, Wiggs, Xenomania	3:45
4.	"Slow Down at the Castle"	Stanley, Wiggs	4:42
5.	"A Good Thing"	Cracknell, Lawrence Oakley, Mark Waterfield	4:00
6.	"Side Streets"		2:56
7.	"Last Orders for Gary Stead"	Stanley, Wiggs	4:28
8.	"Stars Above Us"	Cracknell, Stanley, Wiggs, Xenomania	3:24
9.	"Relocate"	David Essex, Stanley, Wiggs	3:09
10.	"The Birdman of EC1"	Stanley, Wiggs	2:47
11.	"Teenage Winter"		5:45
12.	"Goodnight"		2:31

UK limited edition bonus EP: Up the Wooden Hills
No.	Title	Length
1.	"You Can Count on Me"	3:58
2.	"Barnyard Brouhaha"	0:59
3.	"Let's Build a Zoo"	2:34
4.	"Excitation"	2:12
5.	"Bedfordshire"	3:58
6.	"Night Owl"	2:05

Japanese edition
No.	Title	Writer(s)	Length
1.	"Sun in My Morning"		2:41
2.	"Milk Bottle Symphony"		4:03
3.	"Lightning Strikes Twice"	Cracknell, Stanley, Wiggs, Xenomania	3:45
4.	"Slow Down at the Castle"	Stanley, Wiggs	4:42
5.	"A Good Thing"	Cracknell, Oakley, Waterfield	4:00
6.	"The Leyton Art Inferno"		2:22
7.	"Got a Job"		2:21
8.	"Side Streets"		2:56
9.	"Last Orders for Gary Stead"	Stanley, Wiggs	4:28
10.	"Stars Above Us"	Cracknell, Stanley, Wiggs, Xenomania	3:24
11.	"Relocate"	Essex, Stanley, Wiggs	3:09
12.	"The Birdman of EC1"	Stanley, Wiggs	2:47
13.	"Teenage Winter"		5:45
14.	"Goodnight"		2:31

- The Japanese edition includes two B-sides from the "Side Streets" single in the middle of the track listing.

US edition
No.	Title	Writer(s)	Length
1.	"Side Streets"		2:56
2.	"A Good Thing"	Cracknell, Oakley, Waterfield	4:00
3.	"Sun in My Morning"		2:41
4.	"Milk Bottle Symphony"		4:03
5.	"Dream Lover"		3:32
6.	"Lightning Strikes Twice"	Cracknell, Stanley, Wiggs, Xenomania	3:45
7.	"Slow Down at the Castle"	Stanley, Wiggs	4:42
8.	"Oh My"		4:02
9.	"Last Orders for Gary Stead"	Stanley, Wiggs	4:28
10.	"I'm Falling"	Cracknell, Essex, Stanley, Wiggs	4:22
11.	"Stars Above Us"	Cracknell, Stanley, Wiggs, Xenomania	3:24
12.	"Teenage Winter"		5:45
13.	"Goodnight"		2:31

- The US edition contains a considerably rearranged track listing, adding some songs while removing others. "I'm Falling" is a B-side from the second single, "A Good Thing".

Deluxe edition bonus disc
No.	Title	Writer(s)	Length
1.	"Murder in E Minor"		2:34
2.	"Take Me Home (On a Pushbike)" (previously unreleased)	Ian Catt, Cracknell	1:51
3.	"Another Cup of Coffee" (previously unreleased)	Christopher Neil, Mike Rutherford	5:31
4.	"School Run" (previously unreleased)	Stanley, Wiggs	3:00
5.	"You Can Judge a Book by Its Cover"		2:03
6.	"Who Pays the Rent" (previously unreleased)	Stanley, Wiggs	2:13
7.	"Woodhenge" (previously unreleased)	Stanley, Wiggs	2:22
8.	"Got a Job"		2:23
9.	"Must Be More" (previously unreleased)	Cracknell, Waterfield, Simon Wilkinson	4:01
10.	"Holiday Song" (previously unreleased)		3:01
11.	"The Leyton Art Inferno"		2:19
12.	"Missing Persons Bureau"		4:20
13.	"Inside the Hive" (previously unreleased)	Stanley, Wiggs	5:25
14.	"Aqualad" (previously unreleased)	Stanley, Wiggs	3:52
15.	"Book Norton"	Debsey Wykes	2:01
16.	"Quiet Essex"	Stanley, Wiggs	3:57

- The 2010 deluxe edition included the original UK release of the album and a second disc consisting of rare and unreleased material. The three exclusive tracks from the US release were "mistakenly" left off the 2010 deluxe edition, but appeared on the 2011 single-disc reissue.

2011 single-disc reissue
No.	Title	Writer(s)	Length
1.	"Sun in My Morning"		2:41
2.	"Milk Bottle Symphony"		4:03
3.	"Dream Lover"		3:31
4.	"Lightning Strikes Twice"	Cracknell, Stanley, Wiggs, Xenomania	3:45
5.	"Slow Down at the Castle"	Stanley, Wiggs	4:42
6.	"A Good Thing"	Cracknell, Oakley, Waterfield	4:00
7.	"Side Streets"		2:56
8.	"Oh My"		4:28
9.	"Last Orders for Gary Stead"	Stanley, Wiggs	3:24
10.	"I'm Falling"	Cracknell, Essex, Stanley, Wiggs	4:23
11.	"Stars Above Us"	Cracknell, Stanley, Wiggs, Xenomania	3:25
12.	"Relocate"	Essex, Stanley, Wiggs	3:09
13.	"The Birdman of EC1"	Stanley, Wiggs	2:48
14.	"Teenage Winter"		5:45
15.	"Goodnight"		2:31

== Personnel ==
=== Saint Etienne ===
- Pete Wiggs
- Bob Stanley
- Sarah Cracknell

=== Additional personnel ===
- David Essex – additional vocals
- Shawn Lee – help
- Hugh McDowell – help
- Tony Rivers and Anthony Rivers – vocal arrangements and all male harmony vocals

== Charts ==
Chart performance for Tales from Turnpike House
Chart (2005–2006)	Peak position
French Albums (SNEP)	174
Scottish Albums (OCC)	84
UK Albums (OCC)	72
UK Independent Albums (OCC)	4
US Top Dance Albums (Billboard)	10
