= A Grand Love Story =

Studio album by Kid Loco
- Released: 25 November 1997
- Studio: Lafayette Velvet Basement
- Genre: Trip hop
- Length: 55:13
- Label: Yellow Productions
- Producer: Kid Loco

Kid Loco chronology
Blues Project (1996)	A Grand Love Story (1997)	Jesus Life for Children Under 12 Inches (1999)

Singles from A Grand Love Story
- 1. "She's My Lover" Released: 1997; 2. "Love Me Sweet" Released: 1998; 3. "Relaxin' with Cherry" Released: 1998

Professional ratings
Review scores
Source	Rating
AllMusic	4.5/5 stars
Uncut	5/5 stars

A Grand Love Story is a 1997 studio album by Kid Loco, originally released through Yellow Productions.

== Reception ==
M. Tye Comer of CMJ New Music Report said, "When Kid Loco's A Grande Love Story was released in his homeland of France, the excitement caused by the producer's cinematic, downtempo trip-pop caused swells even on U.S. shores." John Bush of AllMusic gave the album 4.5 stars out of 5, describing it as "an irresistible romp through the lighthearted, pastoral side of trip-hop by way of orchestral pop paragons like Bacharach, Gainsbourg, and Love."

NME listed it as the 35th best album of 1998.

"She's My Lover" peaked at number 85 on the UK Singles Chart, while "Love Me Sweet" peaked at number 98.

== Track listing ==
No.	Title	Length
1.	"A Grand Love Theme"	4:30
2.	"Relaxin' with Cherry"	5:38
3.	"Love Me Sweet"	4:50
4.	"The Bootleggers"	7:12
5.	"Calling Aventura King"	6:38
6.	"Sister Curare"	5:30
7.	"She's My Lover (A Song for R.)"	4:38
8.	"She Woolf Daydreaming"	4:55
9.	"Alone Again So"	7:04
10.	"Cosmic Supernatural"	4:48
Total length:		55:13

1998 Japanese edition bonus tracks
No.	Title	Length
11.	"Cum'on"	3:07
12.	"The Wrong Number"	6:34
Total length:		64:54

1998 French edition bonus disc
No.	Title	Length
1.	"La Seduzione"	5:20
2.	"Pearly Girly Man"	4:18
3.	"Cum'on"	3:07
4.	"The Wrong Number"	6:34
5.	"She's My Lover (A Revolution Sitting Stoned in a Field Remix Edit)"	4:39
Total length:		23:55

== Personnel ==
Credits adapted from liner notes.

- Kid Loco – production, mixing
- Jendah Manga – bass guitar
- Nacer Arab – guitar (on "Relaxin' with Cherry")
- Katrina Mitchell – vocals (on "Love Me Sweet")
- R. Pépin – graphic design
- Benoit Gibert – sleeve
- 120 – photography
