= Heart Failed (In the Back of a Taxi) =

2000 single by the pop band Saint Etienne

Single by Saint Etienne

from the album Sound of Water
- B-side: "Thank You", "Bar Conscience"
- Released: June 2000
- Genre: Electronic; synthpop
- Length: 3:41
- Label: Mantra
- Songwriters: Sarah Cracknell; Bob Stanley; Pete Wiggs
- Producer: Saint Etienne

Saint Etienne singles chronology
"How We Used to Live" (2000)	"Heart Failed (In the Back of a Taxi)" (2000)	"Boy Is Crying" (2001)

"Heart Failed (In the Back of a Taxi)" (also referred to simply as "Heart Failed") is a single by the pop band Saint Etienne. It was released as the second single from the album Sound of Water. It was on the UK Singles Chart for two weeks, peaking at No. 50 on 24 June 2000. The single included two new B-sides, "Thank You" and the instrumental "Bar Conscience", and remixes by Two Lone Swordsmen and Futureshock.

The song has been included on many compilations since its release, including Travel Edition 1990-2005 and London Conversations.

The single's music video was directed by Mikey Torkins and featured singer Sarah Cracknell driving at night and some pictures of an airport.

== Track listing ==
All songs written by Sarah Cracknell, Bob Stanley and Pete Wiggs.

CD: Mantra / MNT54CD
No.	Title	Length
1.	"Heart Failed (In the Back of a Taxi)"	3:41
2.	"Thank You"	4:30
3.	"Bar Conscience"	5:14

CD: Mantra / MNT54CD2 (Mixes)
No.	Title	Length
1.	"Heart Failed (In the Back of a Taxi) [Two Lone Swordsmen Mix]"	3:42
2.	"Heart Failed (In the Back of a Taxi) [Futureshock Mix]"	8:52
3.	"Heart Failed (In the Back of a Taxi) [Bridge and Tunnel Mix (All Is Not Well for Otto and Ulli)]"	5:45

12": Mantra / MNT54T
No.	Title	Length
1.	"Heart Failed (In the Back of a Taxi) [Futureshock Mix]"	8:52
2.	"Heart Failed (In the Back of a Taxi) [Two Lone Swordsmen Mix]"	3:42
3.	"Heart Failed (In the Back of a Taxi) [Bridge and Tunnel Mix (All Is Not Well for Otto and Ulli)]"	5:45

== Charts ==
=== Weekly charts ===
Chart (2000)	Peak position
Australia (ARIA)	132
