= Travel Edition 1990–2005 =

Greatest hits album by Saint Etienne
- Released: 22 November 2004
- Recorded: 1990–2004
- Genre: Indie pop
- Length: 76:41
- Label: Sub Pop
- Producer: Saint Etienne

Saint Etienne chronology
Finisterre (2002)	Travel Edition 1990–2005 (2004)	Tales from Turnpike House (2005)

Professional ratings
Review scores
Source	Rating
AllMusic	link
MSN Music (Consumer Guide)	A−
Pitchfork	9.0/10 link
Stylus Magazine	B link

Travel Edition 1990–2005 is a compilation album by the British pop band Saint Etienne. It was released 22 November 2004 in the United States only on the Sub Pop label.

Travel Edition is the band's first compilation released in the US, as previous collections Too Young to Die: Singles 1990–1995 and Smash the System: Singles and More were released in Europe only.

As a sweetener to fans, the compilation features two new tracks: "Primrose Hill" and "Fascination". "Primrose Hill" is essentially a stripped-down instrumental version of the single "Soft Like Me". The collection also features the rarely heard edit of "Avenue".

== Track listing ==
No.	Title	Writer(s)	Length
1.	"Primrose Hill"	Ian Catt; Bob Stanley; Pete Wiggs	2:09
2.	"Only Love Can Break Your Heart" (featuring Moira Lambert)	Neil Young	4:30
3.	"Nothing Can Stop Us"	Stanley; Wiggs	4:22
4.	"Avenue" (radio edit)	Stanley; Wiggs; Sarah Cracknell; Catt	3:50
5.	"Mario's Cafe"	Stanley; Wiggs	4:32
6.	"Hobart Paving"	Stanley; Wiggs	4:50
7.	"Hug My Soul" (radio edit)	Cracknell; Johnny Male; Guy Batson	3:54
8.	"Like a Motorway" (radio edit)	Stanley; Wiggs	3:42
9.	"He's on the Phone" (radio edit) (featuring Étienne Daho)	Cracknell; Stanley; Wiggs; Daho	4:08
10.	"Burnt Out Car" (Balearico mix)	Stanley; Wiggs	4:19
11.	"Sylvie" (single version)	Cracknell; Stanley; Wiggs	4:02
12.	"Lose That Girl"	Cracknell; Stanley; Wiggs	4:04
13.	"Goodnight Jack"	Cracknell; Stanley; Wiggs	4:22
14.	"How We Used to Live"	Cracknell; Stanley; Wiggs	8:49
15.	"Heart Failed (In the Back of a Taxi)"	Cracknell; Stanley; Wiggs	3:39
16.	"Action" (radio edit)	Cracknell; Stanley; Wiggs; Brian Higgins; Tim Powell; Nick Coler	3:51
17.	"Fascination"	Lawrence Oakley; Cracknell; Mark Waterfield	3:53
18.	"Finisterre"	Cracknell; Stanley; Wiggs	3:45

== Personnel ==
Saint Etienne are:

- Pete Wiggs
- Bob Stanley
- Sarah Cracknell

Additional Contributions:

- Moira Lambert - Vocals on "Only Love Can Break Your Heart"
- Etienne Daho - Vocals on "He's On The Phone"
