= A Band Called Quinn =

Scottish electronic indie rock band

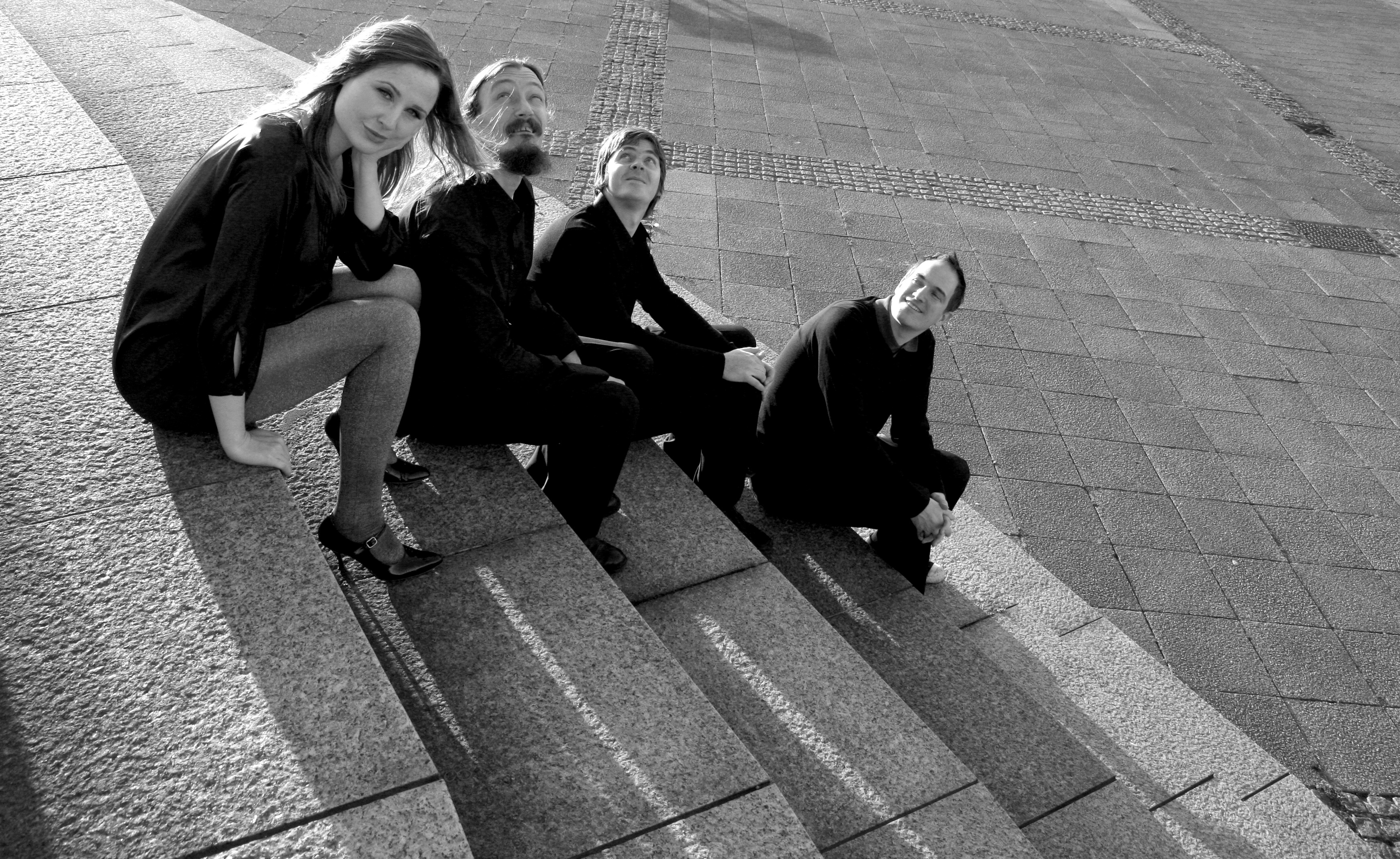
A Band Called Quinn from left to right: Louise Quinn (Singer/ songwriter) Robert Henderson (trumpet/ keys) Steven Westwater (bass) Bal Cooke (drums/ production) Photo by Jane Potter.

A Band Called Quinn are an electronic indie rock band from Glasgow, Scotland. Founding members Bal Cooke (drummer/producer) and Louise Quinn (singer/ songwriter) met whilst working for a performance art company in Glasgow. Other long-term members are Robert Henderson (keyboards/ trumpet) and Steven Westwater (bass). Previous line ups included Alex Kapranos (Franz Ferdinand).

A Band Called Quinn's track DIY opened the sixth episode of Season 1 of The Royals (TV series) on E!. The series was created by Mark Schwahn and stars Elizabeth Hurley and Joan Collins.

In 2012, with investment from Creative Scotland, A Band Called Quinn devised the critically acclaimed multimedia show Biding Time (remix) with theatre director Ben Harrison, Co-Artistic Director of Scottish theatre company Grid Iron. The show was a response to Pippa Bailey's global theatre project Biding Time which explores the experience of women in the entertainment industry. The band toured in the production around the UK in 2014 and to Brazil in 2015 with performances at the Cultura Inglesa Festival.

In 2012, also with investment from Creative Scotland, singer of A Band Called Quinn, Louise Quinn, released a duet Oh Jackie with French DJ & producer Kid Loco appearing on vocals. This track was then developed into a short film with Scottish Film Director Uisdean Murray which was nominated for Best Music Based Short Film at Cannes in a Van 2012, Best Film & Script at Renderyard Film Festival (Spain) & nominated for a Scottish Short Film Award at The Glasgow Short Film Festival 2012. Oh Jackie screened at the Cannes Film Festival in 2013

In 2009 A Band Called Quinn toured in award-winning Scottish based Vanishing Point (Theatre Company)'s revision of John Gay's 18th Century classic The Beggars Opera. It was a co-production by The Lyceum in Edinburgh and Belgrade Theatre in Coventry. It played at The Lyceum, The Belgrade and The Tramway in Glasgow. In 2010 the band released an album of the songs written for The Beggar's Opera with sleevenotes written by Scottish crime writer Ian Rankin.

Parisian producer/ DJ Kid Loco produced A Band Called Quinn's second album Luss. Singer Louise Quinn appears on several of Kid Loco's albums.

A Band Called Quinn's drummer & producer Bal Cooke has produced records for Glasgow artists Bill Wells, The Pastels and International Airport.

A Band Called Quinn appear on the soundtrack to films by Penny Woolcock, David MacKenzie and Ricardo de Montreuil. Three tracks were on the soundtrack for the Kudos produced series Lip Service which was broadcast on BBC Three in the Autumn of 2010.

Another three A Band Called Quinn tracks were used on Lip Service Series 2 broadcast on BBC Three in 2012 . A Band Called Quinn's track "DIY" was used in the remake of the classic The Borrowers starring Stephen Fry & Christopher Eccleston broadcast on BBC One on Boxing Day 2011. Three songs by A Band Called Quinn are featured in Scottish Indie Film "Fast Romance".

A Band Called Quinn have collaborated with Scottish Film Maker Uisdean Murray on several music videos including "Wolf Cries Boy" which received its premier on NBC LA show Action on Film & screened at three international film festivals including Born Shorts in Denmark.

A Band Called Quinn played The Refract Festival in Serbia in 2005 after their song The World Is Upside Down was played on Serbian radio station B92 by Slobodan Konjovic and went to number eight in the Serbian Diskomer Chart. The band recorded an audio diary of the trip for BBC Radio 4's Home Truths programme.

"The Glimmer Song" by A Band Called Quinn is currently featured on STV's online advert which features 360-degree views of Glasgow, Edinburgh & Aberdeen.
