= Good Humor (album) =

Studio album by Saint Etienne
- Released: 4 May 1998
- Recorded: Spring 1997
- Studio: Tambourine Studios (Malmö, Sweden)
- Genre: Pop; dream pop; easy listening
- Length: 43:35
- Label: Creation
- Producer: Tore Johansson

Saint Etienne chronology
Continental (1997)	Good Humor (1998)	Places to Visit (1999)

Singles from Good Humor
- 1. "Sylvie" Released: January 1998; 2. "The Bad Photographer" Released: April 1998

Professional ratings
Review scores
Source	Rating
AllMusic	4/5 stars
Robert Christgau	(2-star Honorable Mention)
Entertainment Weekly	B
NME	4/10
Pitchfork	8.0/10 (7.4/10 deluxe)
Rolling Stone	3.5/5 stars

Good Humor is the fourth studio album by English alternative dance band Saint Etienne. It was released on 4 May 1998 by Creation Records. The American spelling of humor is used in the title as the band were, according to Sarah Cracknell, "fed up with the 'quintessentially English' tag, so there was a bit of a backlash against that."

The album was a departure for the group, who had been associated with the indie dance genre. Tiger Bay, their previous album, had added many acoustic and orchestral elements but still belonged to the synth-pop and dance genres, while Good Humor is more acoustic, having more in common musically with their 1993 hit single "You're in a Bad Way". Good Humor was demoed in the UK using synths and drum machines, but was recorded in Sweden under the guidance of Tore Johansson, who augmented their sound with a full band and a horn section.

== Production ==
Good Humor was recorded in two weeks at Tambourine Studios, Malmö, Sweden. The album was produced by Tore Johansson, who had produced all of The Cardigans' previous studio albums. Most of the B-sides were also recorded and produced during the two-week sessions. Sarah Cracknell cut short the promotion of her solo album Lipslide and single "Goldie" to record the album.

The album's opening track, "Wood Cabin", contains the lyrics "Never write a love song/Never write a trip out/Never write a ballad". These lines are paraphrased from an interview that the Manic Street Preachers did for BBC2's Snub TV in 1991 ("We'll never write a love song, ever. Full stop. Or a ballad, or a trip-out..."), when the Manics and Saint Etienne were both signed to Heavenly Records.

== Release ==
Saint Etienne had always been affiliated with Creation Records through Heavenly Records, but Good Humor was their first release for the label proper. Its original release date was planned for summer 1997 but was delayed by Creation because they were committed to promoting Oasis's album Be Here Now.

In the United States, the group was signed to the Sub Pop label. A limited edition of the US release contained a bonus disc titled Fairfax High, consisting mostly of B-sides from UK singles. Each of the tracks on the bonus disc is available as part of the 2010 deluxe edition of Good Humor. Fairfax High was the first of a series of US-only singles, albums and EPs.

The first single was "Sylvie", which reached number twelve on the UK singles chart. The band wanted "Lose That Girl" to be the second single from the album, but Creation decided on "The Bad Photographer", which reached number twenty-seven. "Lose That Girl" was scheduled for release by Creation in late 1998 but was scrapped at close to the last minute. Remixes by the Trouser Enthusiasts were produced, but were not pressed to even a promo 12". The Trouser Enthusiasts' remix was later featured as a bonus track on the North American-only B-sides compilation Interlude.

An instrumental demo of "Lose That Girl" and a single mix of "Sylvie" by album keyboardist Gerard Johnson are included on the fan club CD Nice Price. The band-written sleeve notes describe the influence of soft rock on the former. The song also had the working title of "Jazz Odyssey" (a nod to This is Spinal Tap).

A double-disc deluxe edition of the album was released on 4 October 2010. The bonus disc contained Fairfax High in its entirety, as well as several other tracks. In September 2018, St Etienne toured a performance of the entire album across nine cities in the USA and Canada.

== Track listing ==
=== Original releases ===
All tracks are written by Sarah Cracknell, Bob Stanley and Pete Wiggs; except where indicated.

Original 1998 edition
No.	Title	Length
1.	"Wood Cabin"	4:07
2.	"Sylvie"	4:48
3.	"Split Screen"	3:24
4.	"Mr. Donut"	3:34
5.	"Goodnight Jack"	4:37
6.	"Lose That Girl"	4:03
7.	"The Bad Photographer"	4:14
8.	"Been So Long"	3:33
9.	"Postman"	3:46
10.	"Erica America"	4:02
11.	"Dutch TV"	3:27

Initial copies of the UK vinyl LP were issued with a bonus 10" CRE 290X, which contained the "Friday Night Boiler Mix" of "Sylvie" and the "Kid Loco Talkin' Blues Mix" of "4:35 in the Morning".

Bonus 10" vinyl (CRE 290X)
No.	Title	Writer(s)	Length
12.	"Sylvie" (Friday Night Boiler Mix)
13.	"4:35 in the Morning" (Kid Loco Talkin' Blues Mix)	Cracknell, Mark Waterfield

US limited edition bonus disc: Fairfax High
No.	Title	Writer(s)	Length
1.	"Hill Street Connection"		3:54
2.	"Hit the Brakes"		3:46
3.	"Madeleine"	Cracknell, Wiggs	3:57
4.	"Swim Swan Swim"		3:03
5.	"4:35 in the Morning" (Kid Loco Mix)	Cracknell, Mark Waterfield	4:34
6.	"Clark Co. Record Fair"		3:15
7.	"Zipcode"		3:02
8.	"My Name is Vlaovic"	Cracknell, Wiggs	2:32
9.	"Afraid to Go Home"		3:27
10.	"La La La"	Manuel de la Calva, Ramón Arcusa, Julien	3:13
11.	"Cat Nap"		2:45

=== 2010 release ===
2010 deluxe edition bonus disc
No.	Title	Writer(s)	Length
1.	"Hill Street Connection"		3:55
2.	"Hit the Brakes"		3:46
3.	"Madeleine"	Cracknell, Wiggs	3:57
4.	"Swim Swan Swim"		3:03
5.	"4.35 in the Morning"	Cracknell, Mark Waterfield	4:34
6.	"Clark Co. Record Fair"		3:15
7.	"Zipcode"		3:02
8.	"My Name Is Vlaovic"	Cracknell, Wiggs	2:32
9.	"Afraid to Go Home"		3:27
10.	"La La La" (Originally recorded by Massiel)	Manuel de la Calva, Ramón Arcusa, Julien	3:13
11.	"Do You Love Me?" (previously unreleased)	Cracknell, Wiggs	2:57
12.	"Cat Nap"		2:47
13.	"Jack Lemmon"		4:22
14.	"Constantly"		2:47
15.	"The Emidisc Theme"		2:21
16.	"4.35 in the Morning" (original version)	Cracknell, Mark Waterfield	3:59

== Personnel ==
Saint Etienne

- Sarah Cracknell – vocals, cowbells, Flying A
- Bob Stanley – synthesisers, Rapmaster 2000, Esquilax
- Pete Wiggs – synthesisers, Tube Rotosphere

Additional personnel

- Sven Andersson – saxophone
- Ian Catt – pre-production
- Debsey – backing vocals
- Tore Johansson – producer, bass guitar, string arrangements, harmonica, klangspiel
- Gerard Johnson – pre-production, piano, vibraphone, keyboards
- Rasmus Kihlberg – drums
- Mats Larsson – piano embellishments on "Woodcabin"
- Jens Lindgård – trombone
- Petter Lindgård – trumpet
- Jez Williams – guitar

== B-sides ==
from Sylvie

- "Afraid to Go Home"
- "Zipcode"
- "Hill Street Connection"
- "Sylvie" (Trouser Enthusiasts Tintinnabulation Edit)
- "Sylvie" (Trouser Enthusiasts Tintinnabulation Mix)
- "Sylvie" (Stretch & Vern Mix)
- "Sylvie" (Faze Action Friday Night Boiler Mix)

from The Bad Photographer

- "Hit the Brakes"
- "Swim Swan Swim"
- "Madeleine"
- "The Bad Photographer" (Radio Mix)
- "4.35 in the Morning" (Kid Loco Mix)
- "Foto Stat" (Bronx Dogs Mix)
- "Uri Geller Bent My Boyfriend" (Add N to (X) Mix)

== Charts ==
Chart performance for Good Humor
Chart (1998)	Peak position
European Albums (Music & Media)	73
Japanese Albums (Oricon)	75
Norwegian Albums (VG-lista)	11
Scottish Albums (OCC)	28
Swedish Albums (Sverigetopplistan)	51
UK Albums (OCC)	18
UK Independent Albums (OCC)	2
