= Continental (album) =

Compilation album by Saint Etienne
- Released: 21 June 1997
- Recorded: 1995–1997
- Genre: Synthpop, house, trip hop
- Length: 52:43
- Label: L'appareil-Photo (Japan); Heavenly / UMC (UK)
- Producer: Saint Etienne, Ian Catt

Saint Etienne chronology
Casino Classics (1996)	Continental (1997)	Good Humor (1998)

Professional ratings
Review scores
Source	Rating
Allmusic	4/5 stars
Pitchfork Media	(7.6/10) link
Jam Showbiz	4.5/5 stars

Continental is an album by the British band Saint Etienne, originally released only in Japan.

Described by band member Bob Stanley as "a patchwork more than a compilation", it includes previously released material such as the UK hit "He's on the Phone" as well as curios like their cover of the Paul Gardiner song "Stormtrooper in Drag". Many of the tracks were recorded in 1995–97, when the band was taking a break to work on other projects. The remixes on the album had all appeared on Casino Classics.

In 2009, the album was released in the UK for the first time as part of the band's back catalogue reissue series. The deluxe edition includes six previously unreleased tracks.

== Track listing ==
All tracks are written by Bob Stanley and Pete Wiggs, except where indicated.

Standard edition
No.	Title	Writer(s)	Length
1.	"Shad Thames"		3:33
2.	"Burnt Out Car" (Balearico Mix)		4:18
3.	"Sometimes in Winter"		4:11
4.	"Winter Melody (Note: "Winter Melody" is a longer version of "Sometimes in Winter (Psychonauts Mix)" from Casino Classics.)"	Stanley; Wiggs; Cracknell	4:44
5.	"Public Information Film"		1:02
6.	"The Process"		3:09
7.	"He's on the Phone" (radio edit) (featuring Étienne Daho)	Sarah Cracknell; Stanley; Wiggs; Daho	4:07
8.	"Stormtrooper in Drag" (edited version)	Gary Numan	5:27
9.	"Star"	Cracknell; Ian Catt	4:02
10.	"Down by the Sea"		3:13
11.	"The Sea (Note: "The Sea" is an edited version of "The Sea (PFM Mix)", a remix of "Down by the Sea", from Casino Classics.)"		7:16
12.	"Lonesome"	Cracknell; Catt	3:25
13.	"Angel" (Broadcast mix)		4:16

Deluxe edition CD2
No.	Title	Writer(s)	Length
1.	"Accident"	Cracknell; Stanley; Wiggs; Daho	4:30
2.	"Is It True"	Marc Bolan	2:52
3.	"Where Did Our Love Go" (demo)	Cracknell; Stanley; Wiggs	2:49
4.	"Groveley Road"	Cracknell; Catt	3:40
5.	"How I Learned to Love the Bomb"	Dan Treacy	3:04
6.	"Postal Interlude"		1:25
7.	"Can't Stop Now (Note: "Can't Stop Now", "Under Her Spell", and "Home" are demos recorded by Sarah Cracknell as a solo artist.)"	Cracknell; Mark Waterfield	4:34
8.	"Under Her Spell"	Cracknell; Waterfield	4:20
9.	"Saturday"		3:20
10.	"Suburban Autumn Lieutenant"	Stanley; Wiggs; Daho	4:04
11.	"We Could Have It All" (demo)	Cracknell; Stanley; Wiggs	2:48
12.	"Lover Plays the Bass"		4:16
13.	"Home" (demo)	Cracknell; Johnny Male; Guy Batson	4:47
14.	"Burnt Out Car" (X Files version (Note: "Burnt Out Car" was originally intended, but not accepted, for The X-Files: The Album.))		2:52
Total length:			49:19

== Personnel ==
The liner notes list the album's personnel as follows:

- Saint Etienne - producer (1, 2, 3, 5, 6, 9, 10, 11, 13)
- Gerald Johnson - engineer (1, 5)
- Brian Higgins - additional production and remix (2), special production assistant (7), production and mix (8)
- Mat Gray - additional production and remix (2)
- Ian Catt - engineer (3, 6, 7), producer (9, 12)
- Funk II - engineer (at Trouble on Vinyl) (4)
- Steve Pattan - engineer (at Fourth Wave) (4)
- Psychonauts - additional production and remix (4)
- Steve Rodway - producer (for Nuff Respect Productions) (7)
- Motiv 8 - mix arrangement (7)
- David Whitaker - string arrangement (7)
- Etienne Daho appears courtesy of Virgin France (7)
- PFM (Mike Bolton) - additional production and remix (11)
- Broadcast - additional production and remix (13)
- Yasuharu Konishi, Peter Paphides - sleeve notes
- Martin Magntorn - photograph
- Groovisions - sleeve design
- Tadashi Watanane, Koji Matsuo - translation
- Ryota Fujimura, Kinuno Hiratomi - coordination
