= Burnt Out Car =

Single by Saint Etienne

from the album London Conversations: The Best of Saint Etienne
- A-side: "Angel" (1996)
- B-side: "River", "Night Vision", "Destroy the Building"
- Released: 22 September 2008
- Genre: Eurodance; indie pop
- Length: 3:41
- Label: Heavenly
- Songwriters: Bob Stanley; Pete Wiggs
- Producer: Xenomania

Saint Etienne singles chronology
"Stars Above Us" (2005)	"Burnt Out Car" (2008)	"Method of Modern Love" (2009)

"Burnt Out Car" is a single by Saint Etienne. It was released by Heavenly Records on 22 September 2008 to promote the November 2008 release of the band's best-of album, London Conversations: The Best of Saint Etienne. The release of London Conversations was eventually delayed to February 2009.

"Burnt Out Car" was originally slated to be a single in 1996 and remixes were commissioned. The release was eventually dropped but the Balearico Mix surfaced on the Casino Classics remix collection and the Continental album. The original mix was not released until 2006, when it appeared on the outtakes collection Nice Price.

The track was re-recorded and produced by the Xenomania team for the 2008 release. The single was backed by three B-sides spanning the 7" and CD single as well as a remix by Mark Brown.

== Track listing ==
All tracks written and composed by Stanley and Wiggs; except where indicated.

=== 1996 release ===
Promotional CD: Heavenly / HVNLP 16CDRP1
No.	Title	Length
1.	"Angel (Way Out West Radio Edit)"	4:11
2.	"Burnt Out Car (Balearico Mix)"	4:18

=== 2008 release ===
7": Heavenly / HVN 183
No.	Title	Writer(s)	Length
1.	"Burnt Out Car"		3:41
2.	"River"	Cracknell, Stanley, Wiggs	3:53

CD: Heavenly / HVN183CD
No.	Title	Writer(s)	Length
1.	"Burnt Out Car"		3:41
2.	"Night Vision"	Cocker, Cracknell	3:48
3.	"Destroy The Building"		3:02

CD: Heavenly / HVN183CDR
No.	Title	Length
1.	"Burnt Out Car (Xenomania Mix)"	3:41
2.	"Burnt Out Car (Mark Brown CR2 Edit)"	3:25
3.	"Burnt Out Car (Mark Brown CR2 Mix)"	7:25

CD: Heavenly / CD-R promo
No.	Title	Length
1.	"Burnt Out Car (Original Mix - Tony Byrne Radio Edit)"	3:09
2.	"Burnt Out Car (Mark Brown Remix - Tony Byrne Radio Edit)"	2:56
3.	"Burnt Out Car (Xenomania Mix)"	3:43
4.	"Burnt Out Car (Mark Brown Remix Extended Mix)"	7:24
