= Brand New Me (Saint Etienne and Confidence Man song) =

Single by Saint Etienne and Confidence Man

from the album International
- B-side: "A Chance to Breathe"; "Carbon Fibre"; "She Needs Love"; "7 Ways to Love" (remix)
- Released: 3 September 2025
- Genre: Pop
- Label: Heavenly, PIAS
- Songwriters: Sarah Cracknell; Aiden Moore; Grace Stephenson; Lewis Stephenson
- Producers: Saint Etienne; Reggie Goodchild; Tim Powell

Saint Etienne singles chronology
| "Take Me to the Pilot" (2025) | "Brand New Me" (2025) |

Confidence Man singles chronology
| "Gossip" (2025) | "Brand New Me" (2025) |

Music video
- "Brand New Me" on YouTube

"Brand New Me" is a song by English alternative dance band Saint Etienne and Australian electro pop group, Confidence Man, released digitally on 3 September 2025 as the third single from Saint Etienne's thirteenth studio album, International. The single was released on limited edition CD and 12" LP on 19 September 2025, which saw it enter UK physical, sales and vinyl charts the following week.

Upon announcenment, Saint Etienne said "Our forthcoming single is a collaboration with one of our favourite bands, Confidence Man. Plans were hatched last year when Sarah was invited to co-write with Janet Planet, Reggie Goodchild and Sugar Bones and the result was ‘Brand New Me’ - a match made in heaven."

== Music video ==
An animated video was released on 3 September 2025. It alludes to Scooby Doo cartoons and portrays Confidence Man and Saint Etienne as rival bands in a pop music competition. The cartoon characters were created by Chris Taylor, whilst the video was directed by Kyle Platts and Matt Lloyd.

== Reception ==
Tom Breihan from Stereogum called it "a playful, shimmering pop song with a distinctly early-’90s groove."

== Track listings ==
CD (HVN848CD)

1. "Brand New Me" - 3:03
2. "A Chance To Breathe" (Saint Etienne) - 3:42
3. "Carbon Fibre" (Saint Etienne)- 3:16
4. "She Needs Love" (Saint Etienne) - 3:20
5. "7 Ways to Love" (Saint Etienne) (David Penn Remix) - 4:13 (Bonus Track)

12" LP (HVN84812)

1. "Brand New Me" - 3:03
2. "7 Ways to Love" (Saint Etienne) (David Penn Remix) - 4:13

== Charts ==
Chart performance for "Brand New Me"
| Chart (2025) | Peak position |
|---|---|
| UK Physical Sales (OCC) | 4 |
| UK Sales (OCC) | 5 |
| UK Vinyl Singles (OCC) | 4 |
