= The Night (Saint Etienne album) =

Studio album by Saint Etienne
- Released: 13 December 2024
- Recorded: January–August 2024
- Studio: Saltaire; Hove
- Length: 41:54
- Label: Heavenly
- Producer: Augustin Bousfield; Saint Etienne

Saint Etienne chronology
I've Been Trying to Tell You (2021)	The Night (2024)	International (2025)

The Night is the eleventh studio album by English pop-rock trio Saint Etienne. It was released on 13 December 2024, via Heavenly Recordings. Recording sessions took place across two locations in Saltaire and Hove from January to August 2024. Production was handled by the band itself in collaboration with composer and producer Gus Bousfield.

== Critical reception ==
Professional ratings
Aggregate scores
Source	Rating
AnyDecentMusic?	7.7/10
Metacritic	83/100
Review scores
Source	Rating
AllMusic	4.5/5 stars
Clash	8/10
Financial Times	3/5 stars
musicOMH	3.5/5 stars
Pitchfork	7.2/10
Spectrum Culture	77/100%
Spill	5/5 stars
XS Noize	4/5 stars

The Night was met with acclaim from music critics. At Metacritic, which assigns a normalized rating out of 100 to reviews from mainstream publications, the album received an average score of 83 based on seven reviews. The aggregator AnyDecentMusic? has the critical consensus of the album at a 7.7 out of 10, based on thirteen reviews.

Ljubinko Zivkovic of the Spill magazine praised the album, resuming: "it is thematic and specific and at the same time one of the most coherent efforts the trio has come up with so far". AllMusic's Tim Sendra stated: "truly beautiful and moving ambient pop mini-triumph that's sad, nostalgic, and elegiac - with lovely vocals by Sarah Cracknell and brilliant production throughout". John Williamson of Clash wrote: "introverted and understated but not underwhelming, The Night rewards repeated listens and while it is unlikely to provide the viral moment that returns Saint Etienne to their rightful place in the charts or troubles new audiences, it will more than satisfy the committed and may, with the benefit of an even longer lens, be among their greatest achievements". Sandra Blemster of XS Noize called it "a lullaby for the modern age—best savoured before sleep, one delicate note at a time". John Murphy of musicOMH concluded: "it may not be what you expect if you're a casual fan, but it's another intriguing little audio experiment from Wiggs, Stanley and Cracknell". Ludovic Hunter-Tilney of Financial Times summed up with: "lyrics convey impressions and fragmentary thoughts to evoke a state between waking and sleeping".

== Track listing ==
The Night track listing
No.	Title	Writer(s)	Length
1.	"Settle In"	Robert Shukman; Augustin Bousfield	3:04
2.	"Half Light"	Peter Wiggs	1:54
3.	"Through the Glass"	Shukman; Bousfield	2:42
4.	"Nightingale"	Sarah Cracknell; Mark Waterfield; Charles Casey	4:09
5.	"Northern Counties East"	Shukman; Bousfield	2:44
6.	"Ellar Carr"	Cracknell; Shukman; Bousfield	0:54
7.	"When You Were Young"	Cracknell; Bousfield	4:27
8.	"No Rush"	Shukman; Bousfield	3:09
9.	"Gold"	Wiggs	2:06
10.	"Celestial"	Wiggs	1:39
11.	"Preflyte"	Wiggs	3:22
12.	"Wonderlight"	Shukman; Wiggs	1:14
13.	"Hear My Heart"	Cracknell; Shukman; Wiggs; Bousfield	6:04
14.	"Alone Together"	Cracknell; Shukman; Bousfield	4:21

== Personnel ==
Credits adapted from the album's liner notes.

=== Saint Etienne ===
- Sarah Cracknell – vocals, tambourine, production
- Bob Stanley – synthesizers, field recordings, production, other photography, sleeve design
- Pete Wiggs – synthesizers, robotics, production (all tracks); recording, engineering (tracks 2, 9–12); mixing (2, 9, 11)

=== Additional contributors ===
- Augustin Bousfield – keyboards, guitars, drums, backing vocals, production (all tracks); mixing (1, 3–8, 10, 12–14); recording, engineering (1, 3–8, 13, 14)
- Guy Davie – mastering
- John Bousfield – flute, clarinet
- Mark Waterfield – backing vocals (4)
- Johnny Wade – crooner (1)
- Darren Holden – cover photograph
- Paul Kelly – sleeve design

== Charts ==
Chart (2024)	Peak position
Scottish Albums (OCC)	65
UK Album Downloads (OCC)	27
UK Albums Sales (OCC)	47
UK Independent Albums (OCC)	15
UK Record Stores (OCC)	4
