= Interlude (Saint Etienne album) =

Compilation album (B-sides) by Saint Etienne
- Released: 20 February 2001
- Recorded: 1998–2000
- Genre: Indie pop
- Length: 39:51; 51:44 (CD version)
- Labels: Sub Pop; Mantra STET-CA-001
- Producer: Saint Etienne

Saint Etienne chronology
Sound of Water (2000)	Interlude (2001)	Smash the System: Singles and More (2001)

Professional ratings
Aggregate scores
Source	Rating
Metacritic	76/100
Review scores
Source	Rating
Allmusic	3/5 stars
Alternative Press	4/5 stars
Neumu	6/10 stars
Pitchfork Media	(7.8/10)

Interlude is an album by Saint Etienne. Released by Sub Pop in the US and Mantra (under licence from Sub Pop) in Canada, this 2001 collection featured UK b-sides and extra songs left over from the recording sessions for their 2000 album, Sound of Water.

The album was released on CD and vinyl formats. The vinyl version includes 10 tracks, and a limited edition orange vinyl version was released.

The CD release featured two "bonus beats". The first is the single mix of "Boy Is Crying" done by Welsh dance act Hybrid; the second is the Trouser Enthusiast remix of "Lose That Girl", which was prepared for the track's (eventually shelved) single release.

The b-side tracks are also available on the Sound of Water 2009 reissue bonus disc, while the other tracks are also available on the Finisterre 2010 reissue bonus disc.

== Track listing ==
All tracks are written by Cracknell, Stanley and Wiggs; except where indicated.

Original release
No.	Title	Length
1.	"Roseneck"	3:25
2.	"Northwestern"	5:29
3.	"Queen of Polythene"	3:13
4.	"Stevie" (Brian Wilson)	3:04
5.	"Red Setter"	3:45
6.	"Shoot Out the Lights"	4:08
7.	"Mountain Rain"	3:42
8.	"Bar Conscience"	4:36
9.	"Le Ballade de Saint Etienne"	3:55
10.	"Thank You"	4:34

CD bonus beats
No.	Title	Length
11.	"Boy Is Crying" (single mix)	3:39
12.	"Lose That Girl" (Trouser Enthusiast mix)	8:15

The U.S. release of the CD also includes the short and long edits of the "How We Used to Live" music video; the Canadian release does not.

- Tracks 1 and 5 are B-sides to "How We Used to Live"
- Tracks 2 and 6 are B-sides to "Boy Is Crying"
- Tracks 8 and 10 are B-sides to "Heart Failed (In the Back of a Taxi)"
- Track 4 is taken from Caroline Now!, a tribute album of songs by the Beach Boys and Brian Wilson.
