= International (Saint Etienne album) =

Studio album by Saint Etienne
- Released: 5 September 2025
- Genres: Indie pop, Dance pop
- Length: 42:49
- Label: Heavenly

Saint Etienne chronology
The Night (2024)	International (2025)

Singles from Saint Etienne
- 1. "Glad" Released: 23 May 2025; 2. "Take Me To the Pilot" Released: 5 August 2025; 3. "Brand New Me" Released: 3 September 2025

International is the twelfth and final studio album by English alternative dance band Saint Etienne, released on 5 September 2025 by Heavenly Recordings. The band has said it is their final studio album.

The album was recorded with collaborators including Vince Clarke, Paul Hartnoll (Orbital), Tom Rowlands (the Chemical Brothers), Erol Alkan, Nick Heyward plus members of Confidence Man.

== Critical reception ==
International was met with positive reviews from music critics. According to review aggregator Metacritic, the album received "universal acclaim" with an average score of 82 out of 100, as per the ratings from 11 critic scores. The aggregator AnyDecentMusic? has the critical consensus of the album at a 7.4 out of 10, based on 14 reviews. More specifically, Pitchfork rated the album with a score of 6.7.

== Track listing ==
International track listing
No.	Title	Writer(s)	Length
1.	"Glad"	Cracknell, Rowlands, Wiggs	3:11
2.	"Dancing Heart"	Powell, Wiggs	3:33
3.	"The Go Betweens"	Bousfield, Heyward, Stanley	4:25
4.	"Sweet Melodies"	Alkan, Cracknell, Stanley, Wiggs	3:38
5.	"Save It for a Rainy Day"	Hunte, Stanley	3:09
6.	"Fade"	Cracknell, Waterfield	3:51
7.	"Brand New Me"	Cracknell, Moore, Stephenson, Stephenson	3:03
8.	"Take Me to the Pilot"	Hartnoll, Powell, Stanley, Wiggs	4:37
9.	"Two Lovers"	Clarke, Wiggs	3:37
10.	"Why Are You Calling"	Casey, Cracknell, Waterfield	3:08
11.	"He's Gone"	Cracknell, Powell	3:10
12.	"The Last Time"	Stanley, Wiggs	3:20

== Personnel ==
=== Saint Etienne ===
- Sarah Cracknell – vocals
- Bob Stanley – keyboards
- Pete Wiggs – keyboards

== Charts ==
Chart performance for International
Chart (2025)	Peak position
Australian Albums (ARIA)	77
Scottish Albums (Official Charts)	2
UK Albums (Official Charts)	8
UK Independent Albums (Official Charts)	3
