= Psychonauts (band) =

- Also known as: The Psychonauts
- Origin: United Kingdom
- Genres: Trip hop
- Years active: 1996–present
- Labels: Mo' Wax; International DeeJay Gigolo Records
- Members: Pablo Clement; Paul Mogg

Psychonauts, also known as The Psychonauts, are a British music duo. They consist of Pablo Clement and Paul Mogg. The two met in Somerset, UK, while "digging through crates at the local record store". Clement is also a member of James Lavelle's Unkle project.

== Career ==
In 1998, Psychonauts released a mix album, Time Machine, on Mo' Wax. In 2015, Fact placed it at number 35 on the "50 Best Trip-Hop Albums of All Time" list.

In 2003, the duo released their first studio album, Songs for Creatures, on International DeeJay Gigolo Records. John Bush of AllMusic gave the album 4 out of 5 stars, calling it "one of the best records to appear from a former Mo' Wax act in several years." Neesh Asghar of The Guardian described it as "a gorgeous record showcasing cinematic soundscapes and seductive ethereal ambience alongside pastoral folk-pop songs and electro disco." The album was re-released in 2010. In a review of the album's reissue, Matthew Bennett of Clash called it "a complete dance album that's rarely been surpassed in the last six years."

== Discography ==
=== Studio albums ===
- Songs for Creatures (2003, International DeeJay Gigolo Records)

=== Mix albums ===
- Time Machine (1998, Mo' Wax)

=== Singles ===
- "Hot Blood / Invading Space (Outer Descent)" (1999, Mo' Wax)
- "Fear Is Real / Hips for Scotland" (2003, International DeeJay Gigolo Records)
- "World Keeps Turning" (2004, International DeeJay Gigolo Records)
- "Take Control" (2010, International DeeJay Gigolo Records)
