= Sound of Water =

Studio album by Saint Etienne
- Released: 22 June 2000
- Length: 42:45
- Label: Sub Pop; Mantra; Heavenly
- Producer: Saint Etienne, Gerard Johnson

Saint Etienne chronology
Built on Sand (1999)	Sound of Water (2000)	Interlude (2001)

Singles from Sound of Water
- 1. "How We Used to Live" Released: 2000; 2. "Heart Failed (In the Back of a Taxi)" Released: 2000; 3. "Boy Is Crying" Released: 2001

Professional ratings
Aggregate scores
Source	Rating
Metacritic	80/100
Review scores
Source	Rating
AllMusic	4/5 stars
Entertainment Weekly	A−
The Guardian	3/5 stars
Los Angeles Times	3.5/4 stars
NME	7/10
Pitchfork	7.7/10 (2000); 7.0/10 (2009)
Q	4/5 stars
The Rolling Stone Album Guide	4/5 stars
Select	4/5
Spin	8/10

Sound of Water is the fifth studio album by Saint Etienne, released in 2000.

== Background ==
It was developed as Saint Etienne's ambient and trip hop statement.

The album's lead single was "How We Used to Live", which was not edited down from its 9-minute running length for single release.

Their previous US release Places to Visit was clearly the beginning of this new direction. Many of the artists with whom they collaborated on that EP are present on Sound of Water.

During the group's tenure with Sub Pop (1998–2005), Saint Etienne released many albums. Places to Visit preceded Sound of Water. In turn, the label released Interlude a year afterwards. Interlude is an album of mostly B-sides from the Sound of Water singles, as well as a couple from the Good Humor era.

The album is one of the few releases on which the band did not collaborate with Ian Catt in some way. The album was co-produced by Gerard Johnson and had arrangements by To Rococo Rot and Sean O'Hagan. It was recorded at To Rococo Rot's studio, Amber Sound, in Berlin, Germany. The band have described the recording sessions as "working in an airless, windowless oven".

"The Place at Dawn" contains a sample of Magna Carta's "Medley", from the 1970 album Seasons.

== Reissue ==
Sound of Water was remastered and reissued as part of Heavenly Recordings/Universal's deluxe editions of the band's recordings on 31 August 2009. The same deluxe edition was released in the United States on 30 June 2017 by PIAS Recordings. The new release features b-sides, unreleased tracks and the entire Places to Visit EP, which was previously only released in the United States and Germany.

== Artwork ==
The album and singles artwork were all designed by Julian Opie.

== Track listing ==
All tracks are written by Cracknell, Stanley and Wiggs except where indicated.

CD: Mantra / MNTCD1018 (2000)
No.	Title	Length
1.	"Late Morning"	4:13
2.	"Heart Failed (in the Back of a Taxi)"	3:41
3.	"Sycamore"	3:46
4.	"Don't Back Down"	4:49
5.	"Just a Little Overcome"	3:41
6.	"Boy Is Crying"	3:52
7.	"Aspects of Lambert"	3:30
8.	"Downey, CA"	4:24
9.	"How We Used to Live"	9:02
10.	"The Place at Dawn"	1:47

Sound of Water deluxe edition disc 2 – CD: Heavenly / HVNLP72CDDE (2009)
No.	Title	Writer(s)	Length
1.	"Roseneck"		3:29
2.	"Northwestern"		5:44
3.	"Red Setter"		3:30
4.	"Blofeld Buildings"	Cracknell, Lippok, Lippock, Schneider, Stanley, Wiggs	6:11
5.	"Bar Conscience"		5:14
6.	"Shoot Out the Lights"		4:08
7.	"Thank You"		4:30
8.	"Chaos at the Gym"	Stanley, Thomas, Wiggs	2:53
9.	"Tony Jacket"		3:54
10.	"Garage for Gunther"		3:51
11.	"Ivyhouse"		2:07
12.	"52 Pilot"		5:37
13.	"We're in the City"		4:41
14.	"Artieripp"		4:46
15.	"Sadie's Anniversary"		3:01
16.	"Half Timbered"		1:20
17.	"Empty Shop"		3:24

Notes

Due to a mastering error on the 2009 deluxe edition of the album, the song "Blofeld Buildings" is longer than the original version featured on the fan-club compilation Built on Sand. The same song starts playing again at the 1:32 mark, which makes the whole track end at 6:11. The 2017 reissue of the release corrected this flaw.

== Credits ==
Saint Etienne is:

- Sarah Cracknell
- Bob Stanley
- Pete Wiggs

Augmented by:

- Gerard Johnson
- Robert Lippok
- Ronald Lippok
- Sean O'Hagan
- Stefan Schneider

== B-sides ==
From "How We Used to Live"

- "Roseneck"
- "Red Setter" (An alternative version of the 12" exists with a 4:25 instrumental version of "Red Setter").
- "How We Used to Live" (Although it is not described as such, the 8:56 version on this single appears to have been remixed slightly)
- "How We Used to Live (Dot Allison Mix)"
- "How We Used to Live (Aim Mix)"

From "Heart Failed (In the Back of a Taxi)"

- "Thank You"
- "Bar Conscience"
- "Heart Failed (In the Back of a Taxi) (Two Lone Swordsmen Mix)"
- "Heart Failed (In the Back of a Taxi) (Futureshock Vocal Mix)"
- "Heart Failed (In the Back of a Taxi) (Bridge & Tunnel Mix)"

From "Boy Is Crying"

- "Boy Is Crying (Single Mix)" (Remixed by Lee Mullin and Mike Truman)
- "Northwestern"
- "Shoot Out the Lights"
- "Boy Is Crying (Hybrid Mix)"
- "Northwestern (SI-Cut, DB Mix)"
- "How We Used to Live (Paul van Dyk Mix)"

== Charts ==
Chart performance for Sound of Water
Chart (2000)	Peak position
Australian Albums (ARIA)	96
European Albums (Music & Media)	86
Norwegian Albums (VG-lista)	23
Scottish Albums (OCC)	31
Swedish Albums (Sverigetopplistan)	47
UK Albums (OCC)	33
UK Independent Albums (OCC)	4
US Independent Albums (Billboard)	27
