= Method of Modern Love (Saint Etienne song) =

Single by Saint Etienne

from the album London Conversations: The Best of Saint Etienne
- B-side: "This Is Tomorrow"
- Released: 9 February 2009
- Genre: Synth-pop
- Length: 3:36
- Label: Heavenly
- Songwriter(s): Hannah Robinson; Matt Prime; Richard X
- Producer(s): Richard X

Saint Etienne singles chronology
"Burnt Out Car" (2008)	"Method of Modern Love" (2009)	"Tonight" (2012)

"Method of Modern Love" is a song by English band Saint Etienne. from their greatest hits album London Conversations: The Best of Saint Etienne (2009). It was released by Heavenly Records on 9 February 2009 on limited edition 7" and two limited edition CDs. Strictly speaking, the release is a double A-side with "This Is Tomorrow", though it does not appear on the second CD.

"Method of Modern Love" was the only new composition (of three new tracks) included on London Conversations: The Best of Saint Etienne; the other two ("This Is Tomorrow" and "Burnt Out Car") were reworkings of previous songs. The track was written by Hannah Robinson, Matt Prime and Richard X. It was produced by Richard X, while Hannah Robinson featured on background vocals.

When asked about how he got involved with the song in an interview with HitQuarters, producer and co-writer Richard X said,

"I've been a long time fan of the band and I think it was a few years ago that they asked me to work on a track but I was tied up. Originally I was asked to remix the ‘This Is Tomorrow’ track ... That was in line to be a single but I think they decided they'd go for ‘Method’ after I played them a rough demo. It was originally done by myself, Hannah Robinson and Matt Prime, but was found to be a good fit for Saint Etienne."

The double A-side, "This Is Tomorrow", originally featured in Saint Etienne's film of the same name about the Royal Festival Hall, on London's Southbank. The 7" single features a Richard X reworking of the track, while the CD single features the original soundtrack version.

== Track listing ==
All tracks written and composed by Robinson, X and Prime; except where indicated.

7-inch: Heavenly / HVN185 (limited edition of 1500 copies)
No.	Title	Writer(s)	Length
1.	"Method of Modern Love"		3:36
2.	"This Is Tomorrow"	Annie, Cracknell, Stanley, Wiggs	3:28

CD: Heavenly / HVN185CD
No.	Title	Writer(s)	Length
1.	"Method of Modern Love (Radio Edit)"		3:36
2.	"This Is Tomorrow (Original Version)"	Annie, Cracknell, Stanley, Wiggs	3:36

CD: Heavenly / HVN185CDR
No.	Title	Length
1.	"Method of Modern Love"	4:20
2.	"Method of Modern Love (Cola Boy Remix)"	6:39
3.	"Method of Modern Love (Richard X Join Our Clique Remix)"	6:00
4.	"Method of Modern Love (A cappella version)"	4:00

CD: Heavenly / CDR (UK Promo)
No.	Title	Length
1.	"Method of Modern Love"	4:20
2.	"Method of Modern Love (Cola Boy Remix)"	6:39
3.	"Method of Modern Love (Richard X Join Our Clique Remix)"	6:00
4.	"Method of Modern Love (Heartbreaks Mix)"	5:14
5.	"Method of Modern Love (A cappella version)"	4:00

Download: Heavenly / HVN 185DIG
No.	Title	Length
1.	"Method of Modern Love (Heartbreaks Mix)"	5:14

- The Heartbreaks Remix was sold as a bundle, together with the 7"/CD1/CD2 set at Recordstore.co.uk.

== Charts ==
Chart (2009)	Peak position
Scotland (OCC)	3
UK Singles (OCC)	56
