= Kieran Evans =

Welsh film director and screenwriter

- Born: Kieran John Evans; 8 February 1969 (age 57); St Davids, Pembrokeshire, Wales
- Occupations: Film director, screenwriter
- Years active: 1995–present
- Children: 2

Kieran John Evans (born 8 February 1969) is a Welsh film director and screenwriter whose work includes music videos, film and documentaries. His 2012 film Kelly + Victor, produced by Janine Marmot, saw Evans awarded the BAFTA Award for Outstanding Debut by a British Writer, Director or Producer at the 2014 BAFTAs.

== Early life ==
Evans was born in St Davids, Pembrokeshire and attended Ysgol Dewi Sant. He later studied art in Carmarthen and Newport before moving to London. While in London he found work as a runner for Steven Spielberg's animation company before progressing through the industry until he found work making promotional music videos.

== Career ==
In 1998 he directed the video for the single Breathe by Kylie Minogue. He continued to work within the music industry and became a regular collaborator for Heavenly Films, a sister project of British record label Heavenly Recordings. This led Evans to work with many of the label's artists. In 2002, while working for Heavenly Films, Evans collaborated with Paul Kelly on the film Finisterre, a documentary based on modern London that accompanied the album by the same name by the British indie band Saint Etienne.

In 2008 Evans released From Here to Before, a portrait of British folk singer Vashti Bunyan, which was nominated for the 2008 Grierson Award. Evans' connections within the music industry led him to chronicle the first of three documentaries based on the alternative music festival scene when he directed a television film of the 2008 Isle of Wight Festival. He followed this the following year when he, along with Matt Askem, filmed Bestival 2009. In 2010 he returned to the Isle of Wight, where he documented the 2010 Festival, co-directed with Askem and Chris Whiterod.

A producer who had seen Finisterre recommended that Evans direct a drama, possibly connected to Wales. This resulted in him approaching Aberystwyth-based writer Niall Griffiths whose literature he was familiar with. Griffiths sent him a copy of his novel Kelly + Victor and Evans was inspired to turn it into a feature. Griffiths allowed Evans free rein to adapt the script, which he changed from a dual story told separately from the perspective of the two protagonists to a more traditional merged narrative. The film received a limited release, but opened to mainly positive reviews. This, his first directorial feature, led to a nomination for a BAFTA Award for Outstanding Debut by a British Writer, Director or Producer. He won the award in this category at the 2014 BAFTAs.

Evans continued working with the music industry, and the year after releasing Kelly + Victor he directed a documentary for Welsh alternative rock band the Manic Street Preachers entitled Culture, Alienation, Boredom and Despair. This was followed by a trilogy of music videos for the band from their 2013 album Rewind the Film. His video for the single Show Me the Wonder won the band the 2013 Q Awards for Best Video.

In 2014, Evans reunited with Paul Kelly for Heavenly Films, co-directing the Dexys documentary Nowhere Is Home, shot during the final nights of Dexys' residency at the Duke of York's Theatre in London.

In 2016, Evans directed 'Be Pure Be Vigilant Behave', documenting the Manic Street Preachers' The Holy Bible anniversary tour. It premiered in Cardiff in October 2016.

In 2017, Evans directed 'Escape From History', which centred around the Manic Street Preachers 1996 album Everything Must Go.
