= The Bad Photographer =

Single by Saint Etienne

from the album Good Humor
- B-side: "Hit the Brakes"; "Swin Swan Swim"; "Madeleine"
- Released: 20 April 1998
- Genre: Pop; synth-pop
- Length: 4:15
- Label: Creation
- Songwriters: Cracknell; Stanley; Wiggs
- Producer: Tore Johansson

Saint Etienne singles chronology
"Sylvie" (1998)	"The Bad Photographer" (1998)	"Lover Plays the Bass" (1999)

Music video
- "The Bad Photographer" on YouTube

"The Bad Photographer" is a song written and performed by British pop group Saint Etienne, and released in April 1998 by Creation Records as the second single from the group's fourth album, Good Humor (1998). The song is produced by Swedish record producer, composer and musician Tore Johansson, and peaked at number 27 on the UK Singles Chart. It also reached number 24 in Scotland and number four on the UK Indie Singles Chart. The accompanying music video for the song was directed by Björn Lindgren, who had previously directed the video for the group's previous single "Sylvie".

== Critical reception ==
A reviewer from Herald Sun complimented "The Bad Photographer" as "another outstanding track. This time, acoustic guitar and inventive bass lines drive a cheery and fun tune." The Mirror viewed it as "quirky". Music Week highlighted it as 'Recommended', writing, "This track marks St Etienne stepping up a gear, and sounding all the better for it. The single is an intelligent mixture of well-crafted pop, boasting a hum-along chorus with a Sixties feel, occasionally remlniscent of The Chiffons' 'Sweet Talkin' Guy'." In his album review, the magazine's Mike Pattenden found that the song, with "Sylvie" and "Mr Donut", "all share a groove underpinned by warm, almost jazzy tones."

Claudia Connell from News of the World noted, "The catchy track mixes classic pop with a sing-along chorus to produce a swinging Sixties feel and one of the most commercial numbers in the band's eight-year career." Joshua Klein from Pitchfork remarked that the band is "embracing the 1960s as fervently as ever" on tracks like "The Bad Photographer". Fiona Shepherd from The Scotsman said it's "about a seedy snapper." A reviewer from Sunday Mirror gave it a score of nine out of ten, adding, "I'd make this the best summer song of the year even if I wasn't madly in lust with Sarah Cracknell. It's just so humdingeringly hummable." Charlie Porter from The Times constated, "Happily, 'The Bad Photographer' offers intelligence and verve in throwaway pop; the simple chorus nags, the lite guitars sound cool and Ms Cracknell sounds angelic as she tells the tale of a fashion photographer with a dirty mind."

== Track listing ==
- CD single, CD1, Europe (1998)
1. "The Bad Photographer" – 4:15
2. "Hit the Brakes" – 3:49
3. "Swim Swan Swim" – 3:07
4. "Madeleine" – 3:59
- CD single, CD2, Europe (1998)
1. "The Bad Photographer" (Radio Mix) – 4:02
2. "4:35 in the Morning" (Kid Loco Mix) – 4:39
3. "Foto Stat" (Bronx Dogs Mix) – 7:21
4. "Uri Geller Bent My Boyfriend" (Add N To X Mix) – 6:08

== Charts ==
Chart (1998)	Peak position
Estonia (Eesti Top 20)	18
Scotland (OCC)	24
UK Singles (OCC)	27
UK Indie (OCC)	4
