= Paul Kelly (film maker) =

English artist (born 1962)

Paul Kelly (born 23 July 1962 Farnborough, Hampshire) is an English film director, musician, photographer and designer.

== Music ==
The son of an RAF fighter pilot, he took up flying aged fourteen and made his first solo flight on his seventeenth birthday. However, a passion for music and electric guitars eventually led him to follow a musical path. In the early 1980s he formed the band Episode Four with his brother Martin. Changing their name to East Village the band went on to join Heavenly Records with whom they recorded the album Drop Out in 1990. The band split up in 1991 after releasing three singles. The album was eventually released in 1993.

Following a brief spell as guitarist with the Saint Etienne live band, Kelly began to concentrate on film and design work, although he continued to produce music, forming the band Birdie with his partner and former Dolly Mixture member Debsey Wykes. They signed with Tris Penna's It Records, releasing several singles and two studio albums, Some Dusty (1999) and Triple Echo (2001).

== Film Work ==
A keen photographer since childhood, Kelly began to photograph some of the other bands he came into contact with as a musician. He took up film making as an extension to this photography work initially directing music promo videos for bands including Saint Etienne, Hal, Cherry Ghost and The Magic Numbers. In 2002 he was asked by Saint Etienne to collaborate on a film project they were planning to accompany their album Finisterre. Described in The Observer as a “cinematic hymn to London”, it premiered at the ICA in London and was screened around the world by onedotzero.

In 2005 he and Saint Etienne were invited by The Barbican to create a film and music event to be premiered in the main auditorium. The result was What Have You Done Today Mervyn Day?, a drama-documentary set in the Lower Lea Valley, the proposed site for the 2012 Olympic Games.

Following the premiere, Kelly, along with producer Andrew Hinton and Saint Etienne were invited by Jude Kelly to become artists-in-residence at London's South Bank Centre. This one year appointment culminated with the premiere of their 2007 film This Is Tomorrow which included a live performance of the soundtrack by the band, accompanied by a 60-piece orchestra in front of a sell out crowd in the newly refurbished Royal Festival Hall. Kelly has completed a six-year documentary about Felt, Denim and Go-Kart Mozart front man Lawrence entitled Lawrence Of Belgravia which premiered at the 2011 London Film Festival.

Kelly and Saint Etienne collaborated again on How We Used to Live (2014), which has been described as "a cherishable, woozy-hazy trawl of London from postwar days to yuppiedom".

== Selected discography ==
- Birdie - Reverb Deluxe 2002 LP
- Birdie - Triple Echo 2001 LP
- Birdie - Some Dusty 1999 LP
- East Village - Hot Rod Hotel 1994 LP
- East Village - Drop Out 1993 LP

== Selected filmography ==
- Finisterre 2002 (co-directed with Kieran Evans)
- What Have You Done Today Mervyn Day? 2005
- This Is Tomorrow 2007
- Take Three Girls (The Dolly Mixture Story) 2008
- Lawrence Of Belgravia 2011
- Hungry Beat (In production)
- How We Used To Live 2014
- "Dexys: Nowhere Is Home" 2014 (co-directed with Kieran Evans)

== Selected design work ==
- Rickenbacker Guitars - Out of the Frying Pan into the Fireglo (2021 book)
- Orange Juice - Coals To Newcastle (2010 box set)
- Fender, The Golden Age 1946-1970 (2010 book)
- Dolly Mixture - Everything And More (2010 box set)
- Pete Molinari - A Train Bound For Glory (2010 LP)
- Caught By The River (2009 book)
- Saint Etienne - Foxbase Beta (2009 LP)
- The Magic Numbers- The Magic Numbers (2005 LP)
- Saint Etienne - Travel Edition (2005 LP)
- 22-20s - 22-20s (2004 LP)
- Saint Etienne - Finisterre (2002 LP)
- Saint Etienne - Good Humor (1997 LP)
