= Stars Above Us =

Single by Saint Etienne

from the album Tales from Turnpike House
- A-side: "Stars Above Us"
- Released: March 2006
- Genre: Disco
- Length: 3:24 (album version)
- Label: Savoy Jazz - SVY 17602
- Songwriter(s): Sarah Cracknell, Bob Stanley, Pete Wiggs, Shawn Lee, Tim Powell
- Producer(s): Xenomania

Saint Etienne singles chronology
"A Good Thing" (2005)	"Stars Above Us" (2006)	"Burnt Out Car" (2008)

"Stars Above Us" is a single from the band Saint Etienne. Taken from the album Tales from Turnpike House, It was released in the US only by record label Savoy Jazz. The single was released under the mis-leading title Dance Remixes Volume 1.

The remixes for the single were done by Eric Kupper and Jeff Barringer. The single also featured the album version, produced by the Xenomania production team, who also co-wrote the track with the band.

== Track listing ==
All tracks are written by Cracknell, Stanley, Wiggs, Xenomania.

CD: Savoy Jazz / SVY 17602
No.	Title	Length
1.	"Stars Above Us (Eric Kupper Radio Mix)"	3:39
2.	"Stars Above Us (DJ Jeff Barringer Radio Mix)"	3:32
3.	"Stars Above Us (Album Version)"	3:26
4.	"Stars Above Us (Eric Kupper Club Mix)"	8:15
5.	"Stars Above Us (Eric Kupper Dub Mix)"	8:15
6.	"Stars Above Us (DJ Jeff Barringer Club Mix)"	7:57
7.	"Stars Above Us (DJ Jeff Barringer Lite Mix)"	3:16
