= Sylvie (song) =

Single by Saint Etienne

from the album Good Humor
- B-side: "Afraid to Go Home"; "Zipcode"; "Hill Street Connection"
- Released: January 1998
- Studio: Tambourine Studios, Malmö, Sweden
- Genre: Alternative dance; dance-pop; synth-pop
- Length: 4:44
- Label: Creation
- Songwriters: Cracknell; Stanley; Wiggs
- Producer: Tore Johansson

Saint Etienne singles chronology
| "He's on the Phone" (1995) | "Sylvie" (1998) | "The Bad Photographer" (1998) |

Music video
- "Sylvie" on YouTube

"Sylvie" is a song written and performed by British pop group Saint Etienne and released in January 1998 by Creation Records as the first single from their fourth album, Good Humor (1998). Produced by Swedish record producer, composer and musician Tore Johansson, the song became one of the group's most successful singles on the UK Singles Chart, peaking at number 12. It also peaked at number seven in Scotland, number two on the UK Indie Singles Chart and number 62 on the Eurochart Hot 100. The accompanying music video was directed by Björn Lindgren and filmed on location in Havana, Cuba.

== Critical reception ==
Larry Flick from Billboard magazine noted that the song "contrasts vibrant music with heartbreaking lyrics". Dino Scatena from The Daily Telegraph named it a "pop gem", describing it as "melancholic" and "simply euphoric". Marc Weingarten from Entertainment Weekly called it a "frothy pop-dance" treat. A reviewer from Herald Sun remarked that it "begins with a classical piano flourish and develops into an upbeat bass and drum dance gem." Mike Boehm from Los Angeles Times described it as "a typically light confection that owes a lot to ABBA's 'Dancing Queen', although it puts a twist and a spin on the Swedes' swooning luster." He also noted that Cracknell "goes on to flesh out the role of an older sister who fears losing her boyfriend to little sister's charms."

The Mirror complimented it as "a brilliantly-crafted heartbreaker, [that] was released a while back and reached No 12 but deserved better." Mike Pattenden from Music Week named it "a tale of two sisters competing for the same man". Brad Beatnik from the magazine's RM Dance Update gave it a full score of five out of five, naming it Tune of the Week. Jim Wirth from NME found that the song, together with "He's on the Phone" are "stellar amalgamation of handbag house and Bacharachian pop aesthetics." Joshua Klein from Pitchfork remarked that the band "even tips its hat to ABBA" on the track. Rob Sheffield from Rolling Stone wrote, "Even when Sarah sings about boy trouble – in 'Sylvie', her little sister tries to steal her beau – she sounds cooler than ice cream and warmer than the sun." Fiona Shepherd from The Scotsman named it "a direct pop song telling a tale of sibling love rivalry."

== Track listing ==
- CD maxi, Europe, CRESCD 279 (1998)
1. "Sylvie" – 4:44
2. "Afraid to Go Home" – 3:28
3. "Zipcode" – 3:02
4. "Hill Street Connection" – 3:53
- CD maxi, Europe, CRESCD 279X (1998)
1. "Sylvie" (Trouser Enthusiasts' Tintinnabulation Edit) – 4:11
2. "Sylvie" (Trouser Enthusiasts' Tintinnabulation Mix) – 8:04
3. "Sylvie" (Stretch 'N' Vern Mix) – 9:12
4. "Sylvie" (Faze Action Friday Night Boiler Mix) – 10:06

== Charts ==
| Chart (1998) | Peak position |
|---|---|
| Australia (ARIA) | 143 |
| Estonia (Eesti Top 20) | 3 |
| Europe (Eurochart Hot 100) | 62 |
| Scotland (OCC) | 7 |
| UK Singles (OCC) | 12 |
| UK Indie (OCC) | 2 |
| UK Airplay (Music Week) | 33 |
| UK Club Chart (Music Week) | 13 |
