= Kid Loco =

- Also known as: Kid Loco; Kid Bravo; Papa Loco
- Born: Jean-Yves Prieur
- Origin: France
- Genres: Acid jazz; trip hop; downtempo; turntablism
- Occupations: Musician; producer; DJ
- Instruments: Sampler/Sequencer; Turntables; Mixer
- Labels: Atlantic; Yellow; Azuli; Bella Union

Jean-Yves Prieur, a.k.a. Kid Loco is a French electronic musician, DJ, remixer and producer. His best-known album is A Grand Love Story (1997), and he has also compiled and mixed a DJ mix album for the Another Late Night series on Azuli Records. He has worked with Jarvis Cocker, with the bands The Transistors (Maurizio Mansueti and Luca Cirillo), A Band Called Quinn, and Mogwai, and produced the album Too Late To Die Young by Departure Lounge.

== Discography ==
=== Albums ===
- Blues Project (1996, Yellow / East West)
- A Grand Love Story (1997, Yellow / East West)
- Jesus Life For Children Under 12 Inches (1999, Yellow / East West)
- Kill Your Darlings (2001, Yellow / Atlantic)
- Confessions of a Belladonna Eater (2011, Flor/Green United)
- The Mystic West (2015, KPM)
- The Rare Birds (2019, Wagram Music)

=== Remixes ===
- Prelude to a Grand Love Story (1999, Yellow / East West)
- Jesus Life for Children Under 12 Inches (1999, Yellow / Atlantic / East West)
- DJ-Kicks: Kid Loco (1999, Studio !K7)
- Another Late Night: Kid Loco (2003, Azuli) – DJ mix album

=== Singles ===
- "Blues Project" (1996, Yellow / East West)
- "The Real Pop Porn Blue Sound" (1997, Yellow)
- "More Real Pop Porn Blue Sound" (1997, Yellow)
- "She's My Lover" (1997, Yellow / East West)
- "Love Me Sweet" (1998, Yellow / East West)
- "Relaxin' With Cherry" (1998, Yellow)
- "Flyin on 747" (1999, Studio !K7)
- "The Love & Dope & etc. Dream Suite" (2001, Yellow / East West)
- "A Little Bit of Soul" (2001, Yellow / Royal Belleville Music)
- "Paralysed" (2003, Azuli)
- "Pretty Boy Floyd" (2008, Village Vert / PIAS)

=== Other releases ===
- Catch My Soul 'People Ya Gotta Love 'Em' (performed with Sylvie Revel) – (1994, BMG / Vogue)
- Kid Loco Vs. Godchild – (100% official reissue CD1) (2002) – remixer CD2
- Delta State(2004) – soundtrack
- The Graffiti Artist (Original Soundtrack) (2005, MettrayReformatoryPicture)
- Monsieur Gainsbourg Revisited (tribute to Serge Gainsbourg) (2006) – producer
- Party Animals & Disco Biscuits (2008, Village Vert / PIAS / FLOR)
- The Man I Love (performed with Sarah Cracknell) (Red Hot + Rhapsody, 1998)
