= Carwyn Ellis =

Welsh musician

- Born: Carwyn Meurig Ellis; 9 August 1973 (age 52)
- Origin: Benllech, Isle of Anglesey, Wales
- Genres: Folk; pop; soul; psychedelia; art pop; tropicália; bossa Nova; samba; cumbia; exotica; experimental; world
- Occupations: Musician; songwriter; record producer; arranger; multi-instrumentalist
- Instruments: Vocals; guitar; keyboards; bass; drums; percussion; banjo; autoharp; bassoon; omnichord; vibraphone; marxophone; bouzouki; ukelin; bulbul tarang; kalimba; harmonica; melodica
- Years active: 1999–present
- Labels: Agati; Banana & Louie Records; Légère Recordings; Seriés Aphōnos; Aficionado Recordings; AED Records; Red Bricks Recordings; Earth Recordings; London Records; NOISE McCARTNEY / Victor Entertainment
- Website: Carwynellis.com; Colorama.org.uk; Zarelli.it; Bendith.cymru

Carwyn Meurig Ellis (born 9 August 1973) is a Welsh musician, composer, arranger, multi-instrumentalist and record producer. He is known as the frontman of Welsh alternative band Colorama, as a member of the Pretenders and as a long-time collaborator with Edwyn Collins. In 2014, they worked together on the soundtrack to the film The Possibilities Are Endless which won the Mojo 'Film of the Year' Award.

Ellis has also recorded electronic music as Zarelli, releasing an album, Soft Rains in 2015 which featured the voice of Leonard Nimoy narrating the Ray Bradbury short story There Will Come Soft Rains. In 2017 Ellis formed the Welsh folk group Bendith and their self-titled album was nominated for the Welsh Music Prize and went on to win the Welsh Language Album of the Year 2017 award at National Eisteddfod of Wales.

Since 2016 Ellis has hosted a regular themed radio show on Soho Radio.

In 2019, Ellis embarked on the first solo project under his own name, Carwyn Ellis & Rio 18. A collaborative project sung in Welsh and recorded mainly in Rio de Janeiro. The album, Joia! was nominated for the Welsh Music Prize. A documentary film on the making of the record, Carwyn Ellis: Ar Y Cei Yn Rio went on to win the Best Welsh language short Film award at the Wales International Documentary Festival.

In 2020, Ellis releases Single Cherry Blossom Promenade and EP Ti to raise funds for personal protective equipment (PPE) for Welsh health and care workers.

During lockdown in UK, Ellis released Chaos Wonderland under the Colorama project on 31 July 2020 and the follow-up to 2019's Welsh Music Prize shortlisted Joia!, Ellis released Carwyn Ellis & Rio 18's second album Mas on 25 February 2021.

The most recent album Yn Rio by the Carwyn Ellis & Rio 18 features the BBC National Orchestra of Wales was released on 22 October 2021, originally performed live and broadcast in March 2021 on BBC Radio Cymru and BBC Radio 6 Music.

== Career ==
After a nomadic early childhood moving from town to town, Ellis' family settled in Anglesey, eventually moving to London where he studied at the Royal Academy of Music and worked with numerous bands through a myriad of genres.

Among the artists that Ellis has collaborated or performed with are The Pretenders, Edwyn Collins, Saint Etienne, Sarah Cracknell, Oasis, Shane MacGowan, UNKLE, North Mississippi Allstars, James Hunter, Roddy Frame, Thee Hypnotics, The 2 Bears, Tracyanne & Danny, Gemma Ray, Lay Low (Sri Lankan-Icelandic artist) and Quruli (Japanese artist).

In 2008 Ellis moved to Cardiff, emerging as a frontman in his own right and calling his band Colorama. They released their Japan-only debut album Cookie Zoo on Noise McCartney in April 2008, and released their debut single Sound via Redbricks Recordings in July 2008.

In 2009, Colorama announced that their double bass player, Ellis's best friend David Fletcher, had died at the age of 37 on 29 June, from a heart attack suffered in his sleep, just days after Colorama's appearance at Glastonbury Festival.

September 2009 saw the UK release of Colorama's album Magic Lantern Show on Redbricks Recordings, featuring songs in Welsh and English. Magic Lantern Show was enthusiastically received with extensive radio play on XFM, BBC 6 Music, BBC Radio 1, BBC Radio Wales, C2 and BBC Radio Cymru.

Early in 2010, Ellis joined forces with Shane MacGowan, Nick Cave, Bobby Gillespie, Chrissie Hynde, Mick Jones, Glen Matlock, Paloma Faith, Cait O'Riordan, Johnny Depp, Robert and James Walbourne, to release a charity single covering the Screamin' Jay Hawkins hit I Put a Spell on You. All the proceeds from the single went to Concern Worldwide to provide assistance to the victims of the earthquake that devastated Haiti.

In autumn 2010, Ellis released Colorama's third album BOX on Noise McCartney / Bad News Records (Victor Entertainment) in Japan and via See Monkey Do Monkey Recordings in UK. Shortly afterwards, they released a Christmas single, Cerdyn Nadolig (Christmas Card), which garnered them the Welsh Christmas Number 1 on the BBC Radio Cymru chart. BOX was also nominated for the inaugural Welsh Music Prize.

Amid other projects, Ellis produced and arranged Italian artist Emma Tricca's album Minor White, which was released on Finders Keepers / Bird Records in the UK, and he worked with French artist Fabienne Delsol on her album ON MY MIND (Damaged Goods), also Dan Sartain's album Dan Sartain Lives (One Little Indian Records), The Keys' album - Fire Inside (See Monkey Do Monkey Recordings) and Edwyn Collins' album Losing Sleep (Heavenly Recordings).

In October 2011, Colorama released Llyfr Lliwio (Colouring Book), which was their first predominantly Welsh-language collection. During this period Ellis was a member of Roddy Frame's touring band.

August 2012 saw their fifth album release - Good Music, produced by Edwyn Collins and Sebastian Lewsley, and released on Collins's new AED Records label, followed by a 12-inch single, Hapus? (Happy?), on Aficionado Recordings in November 2012.

In autumn 2012, Ellis toured Asia playing keyboards, guitar and percussion with the Pretenders.

In 2013, Ellis focused on studio work, recording with Edwyn Collins, Gemma Ray, Roddy Frame and in early 2014, Japanese artists Quruli. He also produced and arranged the second album, Relic for Emma Tricca, released by Finders Keepers / Bird Records in May 2014 and co-produced the first album by Nev Cottee, Stations (Roleplay Records).

In 2014, Colorama released a new EP, Heaven's Hotel, a new album TEMARI, followed by a split single, Yn Rhydiau'r Afon / Forget Tomorrow with The Joy Formidable.

A compilation of all of Ellis's Welsh songs as Colorama was released in November 2014, entitled Dere Mewn!, on his own, new Agati label.

Ellis collaborated with Edwyn Collins and Seb Lewsley on the soundtrack to the film The Possibilities Are Endless, composing much of its original score, which opened in October 2014 to great critical success, winning the Mojo 'Film of the Year' Award.

February 2015 saw Ellis release his first album as Zarelli, Soft Rains on the Seriés Aphōnos label – a mostly instrumental synthesizer record, featuring the voice of Leonard Nimoy reading the Ray Bradbury short story There Will Come Soft Rains. Soft Rains received a nomination for the Welsh Music Prize 2015.

In June 2015 the LP Red Kite by Sarah Cracknell of Saint Etienne was released, which was co-produced, co-written and arranged by Ellis. A single, Nothing Left To Talk About (featuring Nicky Wire of Manic Street Preachers) reached Number 1 in the UK vinyl singles chart on its release. A collection of instrumentals from the album, Kites, was released in September 2016, also on Cherry Red Records.

Early in 2016, Ellis began presenting an ongoing weekly radio show, X Marks The Spot on Soho Radio in London. He also presented a series called Antur Sonig on the Welsh language station BBC Radio Cymru Mwy during the autumn of 2016.

A Welsh language collaborative album, Bendith made by Carwyn Ellis with the folk trio, Plu was released on Ellis's Agati label in October 2016., followed by a five track EP which was released on the Aficionado Recordings label in February 2017. A documentary film about the making of the album, Bendith: Yn Fyw O Acapela was broadcast on S4C in November 2016. The Bendith album received a nomination for the inaugural Welsh Music Prize 2017 and went on to win the Welsh Language Album of the Year 2017 award at National Eisteddfod of Wales that same year.

Ellis's collaboration with Sarah Cracknell continued into 2017 with the release of Saint Etienne's critically acclaimed Home Counties album which featured two songs co-written and co-produced by Ellis. A single, Dive which was produced and co-written by Ellis was released in September 2017, and reached Number 1 in the UK vinyl singles chart on its release.

He continued to work with Edwyn Collins through 2016 and early 2017 on new recordings, including a collaborative song, Fulmar released in August 2017 as part of the Avocet Revisited EP, commissioned by Earth Recordings as a companion piece to Bert Jansch's 1979 album, Avocet.

In May 2017, Ellis resumed touring with The Pretenders, again playing keyboards, guitar and percussion. In October 2017, a special edition version of their album ALONE which included a live bonus disc was released.

Some Things Just Take Time came out in September 2017 on the Wonderfulsound label, and showed the group taking a more acoustic, folk-influenced direction.

2018 saw the tenth anniversary re-issue of Colorama's debut album, Cookie Zoo, made available for the first time outside of Japan via a new Madrid-based record label, Banana & Louie Records.

In 2019, Ellis embarked on the first solo project under his own name, Carwyn Ellis & Rio 18. A collaborative project sung in Welsh and recorded mainly in Rio de Janeiro, it was produced by legendary Brazilian producer, Alexandre Kassin who was introduced to Ellis by Chrissie Hynde who suggested they work together during The Pretenders tour of South America in early 2018. Musicians who collaborated on the project include Alexandre Kassin, Domenico Lancellotti, André Siqueira, Shawn Lee, Nina Miranda, Manoel Cordeiro, Georgia Ruth and Gwion Llewelyn. A documentary film on the making of the record, Carwyn Ellis: Ar Y Cei Yn Rio was shown on S4C (Channel 4 Wales) in March 2019 and went on to win the Best Welsh language short Film award at the Wales International Documentary Festival. The album, Joia! came out in June 2019.

In 2020, Ellis releases Single Cherry Blossom Promenade & EP Ti to raise funds for personal protective equipment (PPE) for Welsh health and care workers. Ellis was initially inspired by his record label in Madrid, Banana And Louie Records, taking part in Music for Gloves and contributing a couple of songs himself to help provide PPE in Spain.

During the UK lockdown, the eighth album under the Colorama project Chaos Wonderland was released on 31 July 2020.

The second album from his solo project Carwyn Ellis & Rio 18 called Mas was also released on 25 February 2021. Mas is a truly international project, featuring players from Wales, Brazil, Venezuela, Argentina, France, England and the US.

The album Yn Rio by the Carwyn Ellis & Rio 18 with the BBC National Orchestra of Wales was released on 22 October 2021, originally performed live and broadcast in March 2021 on BBC Radio Cymru & BBC Radio 6 Music.

On 6 May 2022, Ellis released his first solo album, Across The Water.

== Discography ==
=== Albums ===
==== Carwyn Ellis & Rio 18 ====
Year	Title	Format	Label
2021	Yn Rio	Album	Légère Recordings
2021	Olá!	Single	Légère Recordings
2020	Mas	Album	Banana & Louie Records
2020	Ar Ôl Y Glaw	Single	Agati
2019	Joia!	Album	Banana & Louie Records
2019	Duwies Y Dre	Single	Agati
2019	Unman	Single	Agati
2019	Tywydd Hufen Iâ	Single	Agati

==== Colorama ====
Year	Title	Format	Label
2020	Chaos Wonderland	Album	Banana & Louie Records
2020	Dusty Road	Single	Agati
2020	And	Single	Agati
2018	10th Anniversary Cookie Zoo	Album	Banana & Louie Records
2017	Some Things Just Take Time	Album	WONDERFULSOUND
2015	#40 Mawr Radio Cymru	Compilation	Sain
2014	Dere Mewn!	Compilation	Agati
2014	TEMARI	Album	AED Records
2014	Heaven's Hotel	EP	AED Records
2013	Do the Pump	Single	AED Records
2012	HAPUS?	Single	Aficionado Recordings
2012	Good Music	Album	AED Records
2011	Llyfr Lliwio / Colouring Book	Album	See Monkey Do Monkey
2010	Cerdyn Nadolig / Christmas Card	Single	See Monkey Do Monkey
2010	BOX	Album	NOISE McCARTNEY / Bad News Records, See Monkey Do Monkey
2009	Magic Lantern Show	Album	Red Bricks Recordings
2009	The Music Sounds Better With Huw: Vol. 1	Compilation	Wichita Recordings
2009	Mannequins	Compilation	Kartel
2008	Sound	Single	Red Bricks Recordings
2008	Cookie Zoo	Album	NOISE McCARTNEY / Bad News Records

==== Carwyn Ellis ====
Year	Title	Format	Label
2022	Across The Water	Album	Agati
2020	Ti	EP	Agati
2020	Cherry Blossom Promenade	Single	Agati
2020	Corona Logic Vol. 1	Compilation	Corona Logic
2020	Music For Gloves	Compilation	Banana & Louie Records

==== Bendith ====
Year	Title	Format	Label
2016	Bendith	Album	Agati

==== Zarelli ====
Year	Title	Format	Label
2015	Soft Rains	Album	Seriés Aphōnos

==== Edwyn Collins & Carwyn Ellis ====
Year	Title	Format	Label
2017	Avocet Revisited	EP	Earth Recordings

==== Edwyn Collins, Carwyn Ellis, Sebastian Lewsley ====
Year	Title	Format	Label
2014	The Possibilities Are Endless	Album	AED Records

==== With Edwyn Collins ====
Year	Title	Format	Label
2019	Badbea	Album	AED Records
2013	Understated	Album	AED Records
2010	Losing Sleep	Album	Heavenly Recordings
2010	Losing Sleep	Single	Heavenly Recordings
2010	Do It Again	Single	Heavenly Recordings
2008	Home Again	Single	Heavenly Recordings
2007	Home Again	Album	Heavenly Recordings

==== With The Pretenders ====
Year	Title	Format	Label
2017	Alone / Alive	Album	BMG Rights Management

==== With Saint Etienne ====
Year	Title	Format	Label
2017	Home Counties	Album	Heavenly Recordings
2017	Dive	Single	Heavenly Recordings

==== With Sarah Cracknell ====
Year	Title	Format	Label
2016	Kites	Album	Cherry Red Records
2015	Red Kite	Album	Cherry Red Records
2015	Nothing Left To Talk About	Single	Cherry Red Records

==== With Tracyanne & Danny ====
Year	Title	Format	Label
2018	Tracyanne & Danny	Album	Merge Records
2018	Baby's Got It Bad	Single	Merge Records

==== With Gemma Ray ====
Year	Title	Format	Label
2016	The Exodus Suite	Album	Bronzerat Records
2014	Milk for Your Motors	Album	Bronzerat Records
2014	Death Disc	Single	Bronzerat Records

==== With The Rails ====
Year	Title	Format	Label
2019	Cancel the Sun	Album	Psychonaut Sounds

==== With Fabienne Delsol ====
Year	Title	Format	Label
2019	Four	Album	Damaged Goods
2010	ON MY MIND	Album	Damaged Goods
2007	Between You And Me	Album	Damaged Goods
2006	The Best Of Fabienne Delsol & The Bristols	Album	Damaged Goods
2004	No Time For Sorrows	Album	Damaged Goods

==== With Raf Rundell ====
Year	Title	Format	Label
2018	Stop Lying	Album	1965 Records

==== With Nev Cottee ====
Year	Title	Format	Label
2015	Strange News from the Sun	Album	Wonderfulsound
2013	Stations	Album	Roleplay Records

==== With Emma Tricca ====
Year	Title	Format	Label
2014	Relic	Album	Finders Keepers Records / Bird records
2010	Minor White	Album	EMI
2009	Minor White	Album	Finders Keepers Records / Bird records

==== With Quruli ====
Year	Title	Format	Label
2020	thaw	Album	Victor Entertainment
2014	THE PIER	Album	Victor Entertainment

==== With Roddy Frame ====
Year	Title	Format	Label
2014	Seven Dials	Album	AED Records

==== With Shane MacGowan & Friends ====
Year	Title	Format	Label
2010	I Put A Spell on You (Haiti Charity Single)	MP3	IRL

==== With Dan Sartain ====
Year	Title	Format	Label
2010	Dan Sartain Lives	Album	One Little Indian Records

==== With The Keys ====
Year	Title	Format	Label
2010	Fire Inside	Album	See Monkey Do Monkey
2009	Christmas EP	EP	See Monkey Do Monkey
2009	Le Mans	EP	See Monkey Do Monkey

==== With Lay Low ====
Year	Title	Format	Label
2009	Farewell Good Night's Sleep	Album	Nettwerk
2008	Farewell Good Night's Sleep	Album	Cod Music

==== With Pete Molinari ====
Year	Title	Format	Label
2008	A Virtual Landslide	Album	Damaged Goods
2007	A Virtual Landslide	Single	Big Bertha Records

==== With James Hunter ====
Year	Title	Format	Label
2006	People Gonna Talk	Album	Rounder Records

==== With Simon Scott ====
Year	Title	Format	Label
2006	Rhythm Guitar, Shakers and Tambourines	Album	Diamond D Records

==== With Bap Kennedy ====
Year	Title	Format	Label
2005	The Big Picture	Album	Loose Records

==== With Proud Mary ====
Year	Title	Format	Label
2004	Love And Light	Album	Redemption

==== With John's Children ====
Year	Title	Format	Label
2007	Steve Marriott Tribute [Box Set] - One More Time for the Old Tosser	Album	Wapping Wharf Records
2005	Steve Marriott Tribute [Box Set] - One More Time for the Old Tosser	Album	Wapping Wharf Records
2002	Mustn't Grumble - The Steve Marriott Memorial Concert 2001	Album	Sanctuary Records

==== With North Mississippi Allstars ====
Year	Title	Format	Label
2003	Polaris	Album	ATO Records
2001	Shimmy She Wobble	EP	Blanco Y Negro / Rough Trade Records

==== With Southern Fly ====
Year	Title	Format	Label
2000	High	Album	London Records
2000	Maybe It's The Right Time	Single	London Records
1999	For Real	EP	London Records
1999	Monkey Tale	Single	London Records

==== With Unkle ====
Year	Title	Format	Label
1999	The World Is Not Enough	Single	Radioactive Records, MCA Records

=== Remixes ===
==== Saint Etienne ====
Year	Title	Format	Label
2017	Dive (Colorama & Shawn Lee Remix) - Saint Etienne	Single	Heavenly Recordings

==== John Stammers ====
Year	Title	Format	Label
2017	Waiting Around (Colorama Colorific Remix) - John Stammers	Single	Wonderfulsound
2013	Idle I'm (Colorama Coloured In Remix) - John Stammers	Single	Wonderfulsound

==== AM & Shawn Lee ====
Year	Title	Format	Label
2013	Two Times (Colorama Remix) - La Musique Numerique	Album	Park the Van

=== Soundtracks / scores ===
==== The Guts of The Sea ====
Year	Title	Format	Label
2015	The Guts of The Sea

==== The Possibilities Are Endless ====
Year	Title	Format	Label
2014	The Possibilities Are Endless	Album	AED Records

==== The World Is Not Enough ====
Year	Title	Format	Label
1999	The World Is Not Enough	Album	Radioactive Records
