= Colorama (band) =

Welsh band

- Origin: Wales
- Genres: Psychedelic pop; psychedelic soul; electropop; Folk; blues; baroque pop; dream pop; Balearic folk; acid folk; folktronica; alternative rock
- Years active: 2007–present
- Labels: Agati, Banana & Louie Records, Aficionado Recordings, AED Records, See Monkey Do Monkey, Noise McCartney Records (Victor Entertainment), Redbricks Recordings
- Members: Carwyn Ellis; David Fletcher; Luca Guernieri; David Page; Matthew Evans; Wendon Davis; Ed Turner; Andrea Garbo; Shawn Lee
- Website: colorama.org.uk

Colorama is a musical project by Welsh singer-songwriter, multi-instrumentalist and producer Carwyn Ellis, with an ever-revolving cast of collaborators. Stylistically described as alternative indie pop, Colorama is also often described as a hybrid of genres and languages.

== History ==
Colorama emerged as a Carwyn Ellis home-recording project when he moved from London to Liverpool in 2006. The first shows were as a duo with Ellis's best friend David Fletcher on double bass.

After a stint in Japan touring with Japanese group Quruli, Ellis released his debut album as Colorama, Cookie Zoo on Quruli's own label, Noise McCartney Records / Victor Entertainment, and a debut single, "Sound" via Redbricks Recordings in the UK, both in 2008.

As a touring act, Colorama was augmented with the addition of Luca Guernieri on drums and Matthew Evans on guitar. Through various lineups, Colorama have since played Glastonbury Festival, Latitude Festival, Green Man Festival, Port Eliot Festival, Truck Festival, The Sŵn Festival, The Apple Cart Festival, National Eisteddfodau, Cloudspotting Festival, Home Game, Festival N°6 and more.

In the summer of 2009, the tragic news was announced that their double bass player, David Fletcher (who was also working as Principal Double Bass of the Royal Liverpool Philharmonic Orchestra) had died on 29 June, from a heart attack suffered in his sleep, just days after Colorama's appearance at Glastonbury Festival.

In September 2009, Magic Lantern Show, featuring songs in Welsh and English was released with "Dere Mewn" becoming a modern classic in Wales and garnering rave reviews and airplay on both sides of the border.

In 2010 Colorama released their third album BOX on Noise McCartney Records (Victor Entertainment)in Japan and See Monkey Do Monkey Recordings in the UK. Shortly afterwards, they released a Christmas single, "Cerdyn Nadolig" ("Christmas Card") which reached Number 1 on the BBC Radio Cymru Christmas chart.
BOX was also nominated for the inaugural Welsh Music Prize.

The following year, Colorama released Llyfr Lliwio (Colouring Book), which was their first predominantly Welsh-language collection.

August 2012 saw their fifth album release – Good Music, produced by Edwyn Collins and Sebastian Lewsley, and featured high in many an end-of year best album list (2012). In November 2012, Colorama released a limited-edition 12" single, "Hapus?" ("Happy?") on Aficionado Recordings.

In 2014, Colorama released a new EP, Heaven's Hotel, a new album TEMARI, followed by a split single, "Yn Rhydiau'r Afon" / "Forget Tomorrow" with The Joy Formidable.

In mid-2014, Ellis moved to Berlin. There he recorded electronic music as Zarelli, releasing an album, Soft Rains in 2015 which featuring the voice of Leonard Nimoy narrating the Ray Bradbury short story There Will Come Soft Rains. That year, Ellis also collaborated with Edwyn Collins and Seb Lewsley on the soundtrack to the film The Possibilities Are Endless, composing much of its original score, which opened in October 2014 to critical success, winning the Mojo 'Film Of The Year' Award.

During his time in Berlin, a compilation of all of Ellis's Welsh songs as Colorama was released on his own new Agati label, entitled Dere Mewn!.

In September 2017, Some Things Just Take Time was released, showing Ellis taking a more acoustic, folk-influenced direction. The album was produced by Edwyn Collins and Liam Watson. Other collaborators included Ellis's close friends Cody and Luther Dickinson (Black Crowes and North Mississippi Allstars), Rob and James Walbourne (The Rails, The Pretenders, The Pogues), Jason Wilson (The James Hunter Six) and B. J. Cole. Recorded as live to capture the energy and excitement of Colorama's performances, the album was put straight to tape in London at Edwyn's West Heath Yard Studios and at Liam Watson's Toe Rag Studios.

2018 saw the tenth anniversary re-issue of Colorama's debut album, Cookie Zoo, made available for the first time outside of Japan via a new Madrid-based record label, Banana & Louie Records.

Following Some Things Just Take Time, Ellis worked extensively both with The Pretenders and with Edwyn Collins. Whilst on tour in South America, Chrissie Hynde suggested that he make an album in Welsh with Brazilian musicians – this he did in Rio de Janeiro late in 2018, releasing Joia! as the first solo project under his own name, Carwyn Ellis & Rio 18 in 2019.

During this period, Ellis also recorded intermittently with American producer and multi-instrumentalist Shawn Lee at his studio in London, which ultimately resulted in the eighth studio album as Colorama, Chaos Wonderland. This was released on 31 July 2020, and featured a guest appearance from Icelandic-Sri Lankan artist Lay Low on vocal.

The most recent album Chaos Wonderland was nominated for the Welsh Music Prize.

== Discography ==
=== Albums ===
- Chaos Wonderland (2020, Spain); Banana & Louie Records
- 10th Anniversary Cookie Zoo (2018, Spain); Banana & Louie Records
- Some Things Just Take Time (2017, UK); Agati
- TEMARI (2014, UK); AED Records
- Good Music (2012, UK); AED Records
- Llyfr Lliwio / Colouring Book (2011, UK); See Monkey Do Monkey
- BOX (2010, UK); See Monkey Do Monkey (2010, Japan); Noise McCartney Records / Victor Entertainment
- Magic Lantern Show (2009, UK); Redbricks Recordings
- Cookie Zoo (2008, Japan); NOISE McCARTNEY RECORDS / Victor Entertainment

=== Singles ===
- "Dusty Road" (2020, UK); Agati
- "And" (2020, UK); Agati
- "Forget Tomorrow" (2014, UK); Aruthrol
- "Hapus?" (2012, UK); Aficionado Recordings
- "Cerdyn Nadolig" / "Christmas Card" (2010, UK); See Monkey Do Monkey
- "Sound" (2007, UK); Redbricks Recordings

=== EPs ===
- Heaven's Hotel (2014, UK); AED Records
- Do the Pump (2013, UK); AED Records

=== Compilation albums ===
- Dere Mewn! (2015, UK); Agati
- #40 Mawr Radio Cymru (2015, UK); Sain
- Mannequins (2009, UK); Kartel
- The Music Sounds Better With Huw: Vol. 1 (2009, UK); Wichita Recordings

=== Remixes ===
- Dive (Colorama & Shawn Lee Remix) – Saint Etienne (2017, UK); Heavenly Recordings
- Waiting Around (Colorama Colorific Remix) – John Stammers (2017, UK); Wonderfulsound
- Idle I'm (Colorama Coloured in Remix) – John Stammers (2013, UK); Wonderfulsound
- Two Times (Colorama Remix) – La Musique Numerique – AM & Shawn Lee (2013, US); Park the Van
