= 2014 Bonnaroo Music Festival =

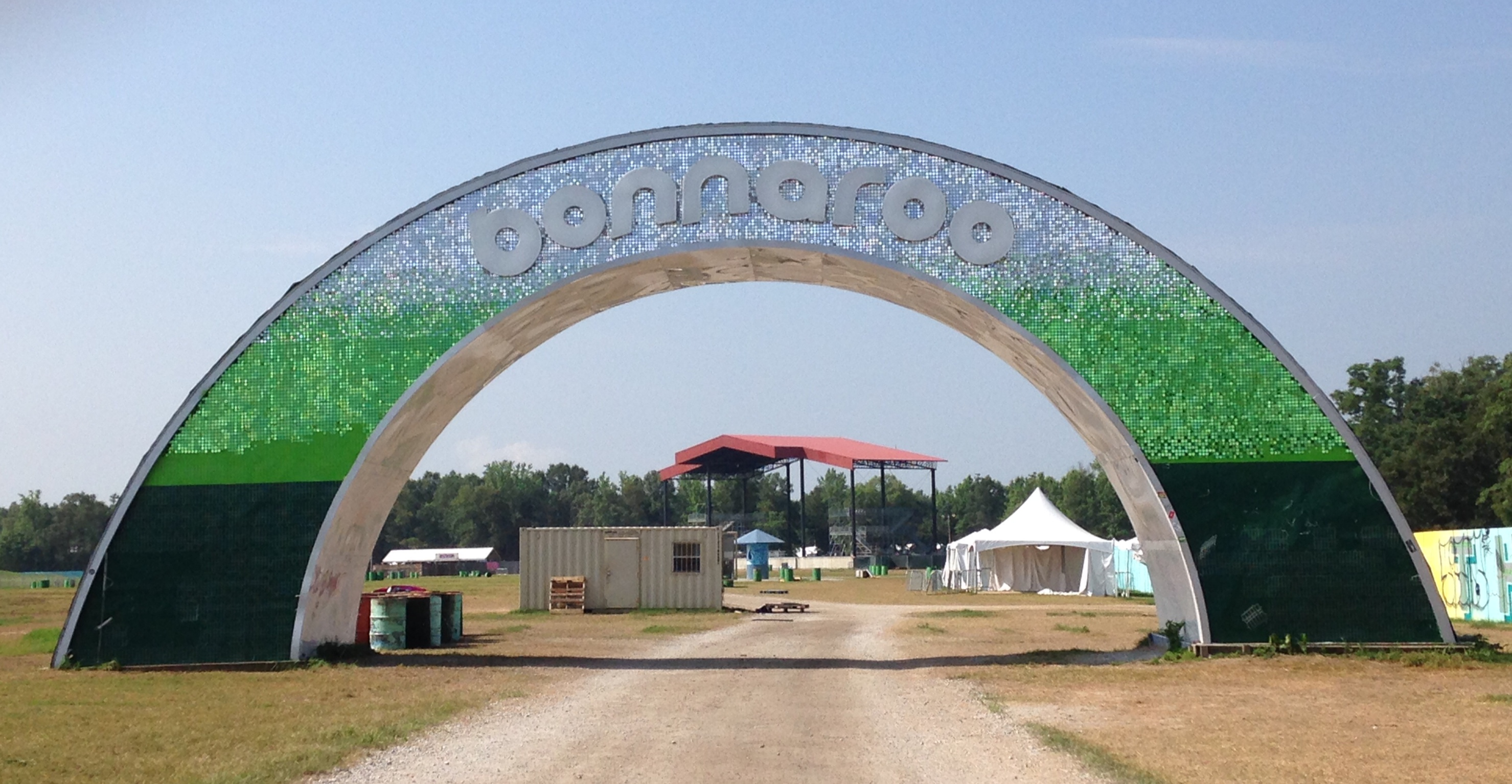

The 2014 Bonnaroo Music Festival was held June 12–15, 2014 in Manchester, Tennessee, United States, and marked the 13th time the festival has been held since its inception in 2002.

== Line-up ==
=== Thursday, June 12 ===
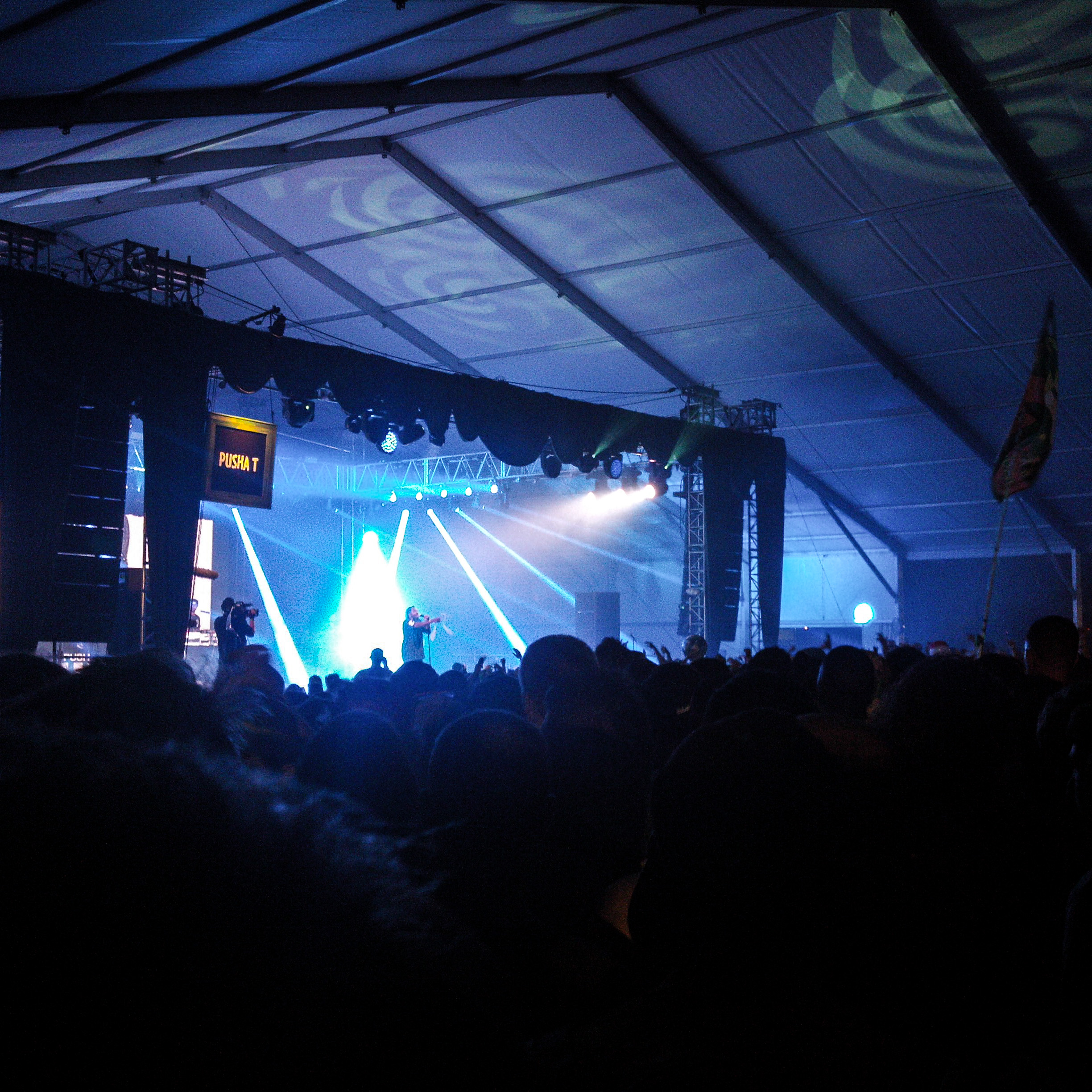

(artists listed from earliest to latest set times)

- This Tent:
  - Jonathan Wilson
  - Cass McCombs
  - Thao & The Get Down Stay Down
  - Cloud Nothings
  - BANKS
  - J Roddy Walston and the Business
  - Ty Segall
- That Tent:
  - The Preatures
  - Allah-Las
  - ZZ Ward
  - Real Estate
  - Cherub
  - Omar Souleyman
  - White Denim
- The Other Tent:
  - The Wild Feathers
  - Robert Delong
  - Caveman
  - MS MR
  - Break Science
  - Poliça
  - Pusha T
- Comedy Theatre:
  - Taran Killam and his Friends with Good Neighbor, Ryan Belleville and Tim Robinson
  - Hannibal Buress with Sasheer Zamata and Emily Heller
  - Bonnaroo Nights with Brooks Wheelan, Emily Heller, Sasheer Zamata, Brad Williams and Seth Herzog
  - Bonnaroo Nights with Brooks Wheelan, Emily Heller, Sasheer Zamata and Seth Herzog
- New Music On Tap Lounge brewed by Miller Lite:
  - Bully
  - The Unlikely Candidates
  - AM & Shawn Lee (canceled)
  - The Saint Johns
  - Monster Truck
  - Parade of Lights
  - Hunter Hunted
  - Kins
- Silent Disco:
  - Quickie Mart
  - DJ Logic
  - AM & Shawn Lee (DJ Set; canceled)
  - Robert DeLong (DJ Set)
- Cinema Tent:
  - Green Screens Presented by Rock The Earth: The Human Experiment - Q&A with Scott Banbury of the Sierra Club
  - The First and Probably Last Annual Bonnaroo Intergalactic Feline Film & Video Festival For Humans - Hosted by Mike Keegan and Jay Wertzler
  - Take Me to the River - Screening and Q&A with director Martin Shore plus Live Performance with William Bell, Bobby Rush, Frayser Boy, Al Kapone, Jerry Harrison, the Norman Sisters, Ify, Stax Music Academy Students, the Hi Rhythm Section, Ben Cauley and the Royal Memphis Horns, and Boo Mitchell
  - NBA Finals Game 4
  - Live interactive performance: Point Break Live! – You Can BE Keanu!
  - [IFC] and The Action Pack Present: R. Kelly’s Trapped in the Closet Sing-Along – Hosted by Henri Mazza
- Solar Stage:
  - Ogya (Afrobeat)
  - Raising Caine
  - Bonnaroots Dinner
- Snake & Jake's Christmas Club Barn
  - Tiki Disco
  - High & Mighty Brass Band
  - Full Service Party
  - Gypsyphonic Disco
  - Tiki Disco

=== Friday, June 13 ===
(artists listed from earliest to latest set times)

- What Stage:
  - Greensky Bluegrass
  - Big Sam's Funky Nation
  - Umphrey's McGee
  - Janelle Monáe
  - Vampire Weekend
  - Kanye West
- Which Stage:
  - Vintage Trouble
  - Dr. Dog
  - Ben Howard
  - The Head and the Heart
  - Phoenix
  - Ice Cube
  - Skrillex
- This Tent:
  - Jon Batiste and Stay Human
  - The Wood Brothers
  - Jake Bugg
  - Andrew Bird & the Hands of Glory
  - Neutral Milk Hotel
  - Mastodon
  - Deafheaven
  - Meshuggah
- That Tent:
  - La Santa Cecilia
  - Seun Kuti & Egypt 80
  - DakhaBrakha
  - The Master Musicians of Jajouka led by Bachir Attar, with special guests Billy Martin, Marc Ribot, DJ Logic and Shahzad Ismaily
  - A Tribe Called Red
  - SuperJam: Derek Trucks featuring Chaka Khan, Taj Mahal, Eric Krasno, Willie Weeks, Nigel Hall, Eric Bloom, Ryan Zoidis, James Gadson, David Hidalgo, and Adam Deitch with special guests Andrew Bird, Susan Tedeschi, Karl Denson, and Ben Folds
  - Chance The Rapper
- The Other Tent:
  - St. Paul & The Broken Bones
  - Sam Smith
  - Danny Brown
  - The Naked and Famous
  - CHVRCHES
  - Disclosure
  - Die Antwoord
- Comedy Theatre:
  - Craig Robinson & the Nasty Delicious with Seth Herzog and Brooks Wheelan
  - Hannibal Buress with Sasheer Zamata and Emily Heller
  - T.J. Miller and Neal Brennan with Rory Scovel
  - Taran Killam and his Friends with Good Neighbor, Ryan Belleville and Tim Robinson
- Cafe Where?:
  - Donald Cumming
  - Lily & the Parlour Tricks
  - Skinny Lister
  - Empires
- New Music On Tap Lounge brewed by Miller Lite:
  - Royal Teeth
  - Arc Iris
  - Roadkill Ghost Choir
  - John & Jacob
  - The Orwells
  - Fly Golden Eagle
  - Animals As Leaders
  - Blank Range
  - Speedy Ortiz
  - Diarrhea Planet
- Silent Disco:
  - Le Chev
  - Classixx (DJ Set)
  - Tiki Disco
  - DJ Logic
  - Jared Dietch
- Cinema Tent:
  - LIVE PERFORMANCE: Marc Ribot and Charlie Chaplin's The Kid
  - Green Screens Presented by Rock The Earth: DamNation - Introduction by Andrew Bird / Q&A with Morgan Beard of Sub-Genre [sic] Films
  - Finding Fela - Q&A with Seun Kuti
  - This Is The End - Introduction by Craig Robinson
  - The Action Pack Presents: Big Screen Yacht Rock Smooth Jamz Karaoke Party - Hosted by Henri Mazza
  - LIVE INTERACTIVE PERFORMANCE: Terminator Too: Judgment Play Live! - You Can BE Arnold!
  - Friday the 13th - The Original 1980 Version
- Solar Stage:
  - Breathing with The Art of Living
  - Skinny Lister (Performance & Interview)
  - Bronze Radio Return (Performance & Interview)
  - Meet the Bonnaroo Works Fund
  - Lily & the Parlour Tricks (Performance & Interview)
  - Arc Iris (Performance & Interview)
  - DJ Alpha Trion & the Bonnaroo B-Boys
  - Ogya (Afrobeat)
- Sonic Stage:
  - Hunter Hunted
  - Jonathan Wilson
  - ZZ Ward (acoustic)
  - Greensky Bluegrass
  - Jon Batiste and Stay Human
  - The Wood Brothers
  - J Roddy Walston and the Business
  - AM & Shawn Lee
- Snake & Jake's Christmas Club Barn:
  - High and Mighty Brass Band
  - Full Service Party
  - Friday the 13th Party (Full Service Party)
  - Tiki Disco

=== Saturday, June 14 ===
(artists listed from earliest to latest set times)

- What Stage:
  - Seasick Steve
  - Tedeschi Trucks Band
  - Damon Albarn
  - Lionel Richie
  - Jack White
- Which Stage:
  - High and Mighty Brass Band
  - Blackberry Smoke
  - Cake
  - Cage the Elephant
  - Chromeo
  - Zedd
  - The Flaming Lips
  - Kaskade
- This Tent:
  - Valerie June
  - First Aid Kit
  - Drive-By Truckers
  - Phosphorescent
  - Cut Copy
  - SuperJam with Skrillex and friends featuring Big Gigantic with special guests Damian "Jr. Gong" Marley, Joel Cummins of Umphrey's McGee, Robby Krieger (of The Doors), Zedd, Mickey Hart, Janelle Monáe, Warpaint, Mike Einziger, A$AP Ferg, Thundercat, and more
- That Tent:
  - King Khan and the Shrines
  - The Bouncing Souls
  - Grouplove
  - Slightly Stoopid
  - James Blake
  - Nick Cave & The Bad Seeds
  - Darkside
- The Other Tent:
  - Classixx
  - Haerts
  - Bobby Womack
  - John Butler Trio
  - Ms. Lauryn Hill
  - Frank Ocean
  - The Glitch Mob
- Comedy Theatre:
  - Craig Robinson & the Nasty Delicious with Seth Herzog
  - Down N' Dirty with Broad City Live, Bridget Everett & the Tender Moments and Brad Williams (2 sets)
  - Neal Brennan and T.J. Miller with Rory Scovel
- Cafe Where?:
  - Royal Canoe
  - Sam Hunt
  - Jamestown Revival
  - The Black Cadillacs
- New Music On Tap Lounge brewed by Miller Lite:
  - ELEL
  - The Lonely Biscuits
  - Kevin Devine
  - Wild Child
  - The Bots
  - The Dunwells
  - Streets of Laredo
  - Syd Arthur
  - Ásgeir
- Silent Disco:
  - Holden
  - Solu Music
  - Le Chev
  - Jared Dietch
  - Classixx (DJ Set)
  - Jonathan Toubin
- Cinema Tent:
  - Spotlight on the Farrelly Brothers: Kingpin - Q&A with Peter & Bobby Farrelly
  - Spotlight on the Farrelly Brothers: Dumb and Dumber - 20th Anniversary - Introduction by Peter & Bobby Farrelly
  - Comedy Central's "Drunk History" Live - with Derek Waters & Friends
  - Comedy Central's "Brickleberry" Live - with co-creators and voice actors Roger Black and Waco O'Guin
  - Green Screens Presented by Rock The Earth: Above All Else - Q&A with executive producer Paul Bassis
  - Ping Pong Summer
  - Dear White People
  - The Action Pack Presents: Michael Jackson Sing-Along - Hosted by Henri Mazza
  - Remembering Harold Ramis: Groundhog Day
- Solar Stage:
  - Breathing with The Art of Living
  - Red Bull Music Academy Panel
  - Represent US: Taking Back Our Government Discussion
  - John Butler
  - B'rooers University Highlights and Sustainability
  - Jamestown Revival
  - Wayne Coyne
  - BonnaROOTS Dinner
  - DJ Alpha Trion & The Bonnaroo B-Boys
- Sonic Stage:
  - The Saint Johns
  - Wild Child
  - Jeremy Messersmith
  - Cherub
  - The Dunwells
  - Caveman
  - Desert Noises
  - Cayucas
- Snake & Jake's Christmas Club Barn:
  - NOLA Bounce Party (Full Service Party)
  - Full Service Party
  - Rob Rage
  - 90's Rave Party (Full Service Party)

=== Sunday, June 15 ===
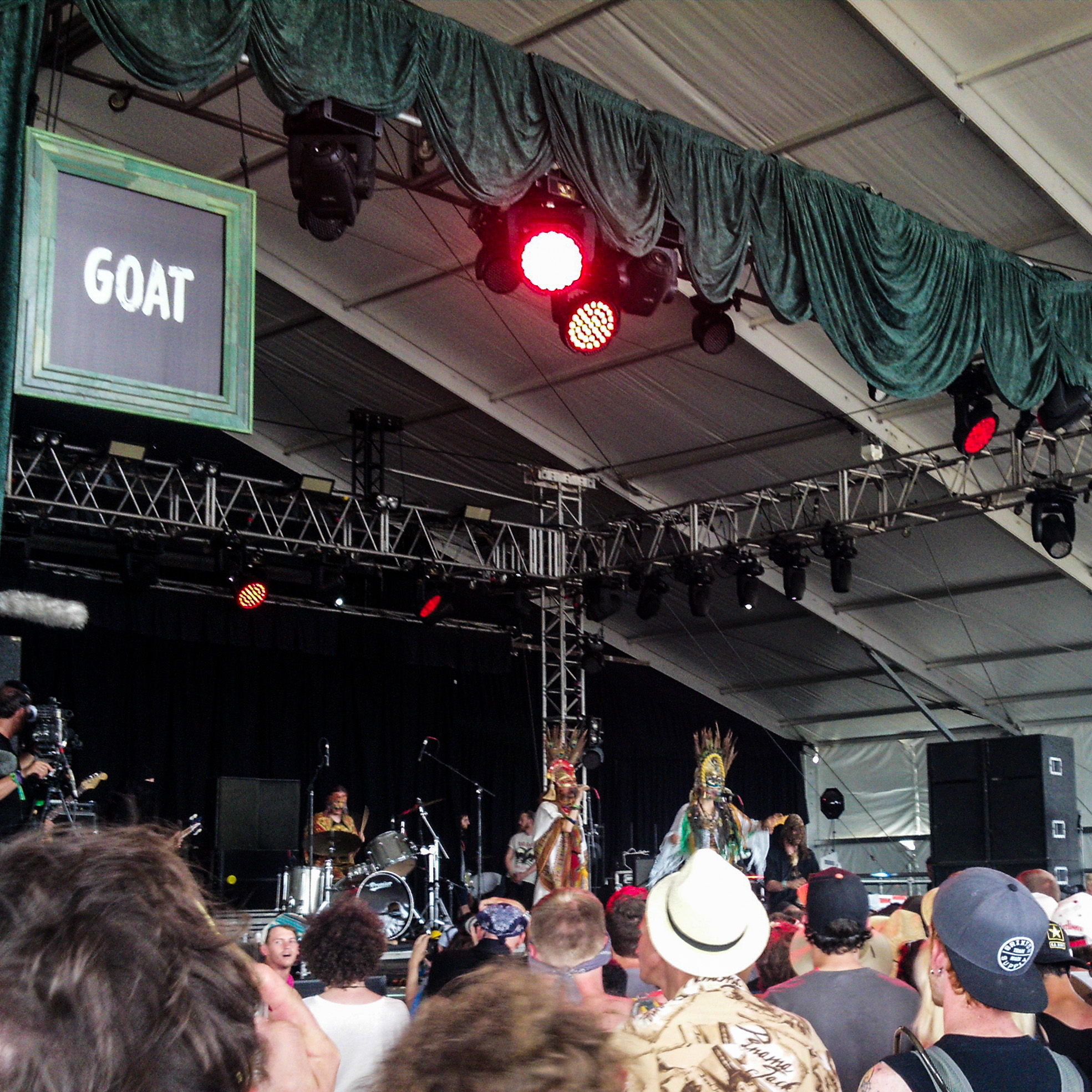

(artists listed from earliest to latest set times)

- What Stage:
  - Carolina Chocolate Drops
  - Yonder Mountain String Band
  - Arctic Monkeys
  - The Avett Brothers
  - Elton John
- Which Stage:
  - Lucero
  - Capital Cities
  - Fitz and the Tantrums
  - Broken Bells
  - Wiz Khalifa
- This Tent:
  - Vance Joy
  - Okkervil River
  - Warpaint
  - City and Colour
  - Amos Lee
- That Tent:
  - Lake Street Dive
  - Sarah Jarosz
  - The Lone Bellow
  - Shovels & Rope
  - The Black Lillies
  - The Bluegrass Situation SuperJam hosted by Ed Helms
- The Other Tent:
  - Those Darlins
  - Goat
  - A$AP Ferg
  - Washed Out
  - Little Dragon
- Comedy Theatre:
  - Down N' Dirty with Broad City Live, Bridget Everett & the Tender Moments and Brad Williams
  - Neal Brennan and T.J. Miller with Rory Scovel (2 sets)
- Cafe Where?:
  - Black Pistol Fire
  - Jennifer Sullivan
  - The Griswolds
  - Wild Child
- New Music On Tap Lounge brewed by Miller Lite:
  - Kansas Bible Company
  - TBA
  - The Futures League
  - Jeremy Messersmith
  - Willy Mason
  - Cayucas
  - Bronze Radio Return
- Silent Disco:
  - Jonathan Toubin
- Cinema Tent:
  - They Came Together - Q&A with director/co-writer David Wain
  - Spotlight on Harry Shearer: This Is Spinal Tap 30th Anniversary - Q&A with Harry Shearer
  - Spotlight on Harry Shearer: A Mighty Wind - Introduction by Harry Shearer
  - NBA Finals Game 5 (if necessary)
- Solar Stage:
  - Breathing with The Art of Living
  - The Lone Bellow (Performance & Interview)
  - Roadkill Ghost Choir (Performance & Interview)
  - Music For Social Change (The Black Lillies & special guests, presented by Oxfam)
  - Carolina Chocolate Drops (Performance & Interview)
  - Discussion with Appalachian Citizens' Law Center
  - Mawre (African Drum/Dance)
- Sonic Stage:
  - High and Mighty Brass Band
  - Jennifer Sullivan
  - Ásgeir
  - Sam Hunt
  - The Black Cadillacs
  - Royal Canoe
  - Syd Arthur
- Snake & Jake's Christmas Club Barn:
  - Classic Hip Hop Party (Full Service Party)
  - Full Service Party
