= The Hard Way (James Hunter album) =

Studio album by James Hunter
- Released: 10 June 2008
- Genre: British R&B, blue-eyed soul, soul blues
- Label: Hear Music
- Producer: Liam Watson

James Hunter chronology
People Gonna Talk (2006)	The Hard Way (2008)

Professional ratings
Review scores
Source	Rating
Allmusic	3.5/5 stars

The Hard Way is the fourth album by English singer-songwriter James Hunter, released on 10 June 2008. The album charted at number one on the Billboard Top Blues Album chart and number five on the Billboard Heatseekers chart.

== Track listing ==
All songs written by James Hunter.

1. "The Hard Way" – 2:29
2. "Tell Her" – 3:24
3. "Don't Do Me No Favours" – 4:18
4. "Carina" – 4:10
5. "She's Got a Way" – 2:41
6. "'Til the End" – 4:19
7. "Hand It Over" – 3:27
8. "Jacqueline" – 2:28
9. "Class Act" – 3:00
10. "Ain't Goin' Nowhere" – 2:19
11. "Believe Me Baby" – 2:44
12. "Strange But True" – 3:16

== Personnel ==
- James Hunter – guitar, vocals
- Lee Badau – baritone saxophone
- Ellen Blair – violin
- Gillon Cameron – violin
- Damian Hand – tenor saxophone, string arrangements, musical direction
- Kyle Koehler – Hammond organ
- Jennymay Logan – violin, viola
- Gill Morley – violin
- Nicky Sweeney – violin
- Tony Woollard – cello

=== Guest musicians ===
- Allen Toussaint – piano, electric piano, backing vocals
- George Chandler – backing vocals
- Dave Priseman – trumpet, flugelhorn
- B. J. Cole – pedal steel guitar

=== Production ===
- Christian "ChrisRam" Ramirez – photography
- Liam Watson – producer, engineer, mixing
- Richard Mantel – art direction, design
