= Moses Hightower =

Icelandic band

- Origin: Reykjavík, Iceland
- Genres: Soul; R&B
- Years active: 2007–present
- Labels: Record Records
- Members: Steingrímur Karl Teague; Andri Ólafsson; Magnús Trygvason Eliassen
- Past members: Daníel Friðrik Böðvarsson
- Website: moseshightower.com

Moses Hightower is an Icelandic soul band based out of Reykjavík, formed in 2007 by guitarist Daníel Friðrik Böðvarsson, drummer Magnús Trygvason Eliassen, bassist & lead singer Andri Ólafsson, and keyboard player & lead singer Steingrímur Karl Teague. The band has released three critically acclaimed full-length albums, and received Icelandic Music Awards along the way.

== Music ==
=== Búum til börn ===
Starting out as the live band for solo chanteuse Dísa (Bryndís Jakobsdóttir), the group soon received considerable airplay with the single that would later become the title track of their debut album, Búum til börn (which translates as "Let's make babies").

Recorded and mixed by Magnús Øder (Benny Crespo's Gang, Lay Low), the album was self-released on 5 July 2010 and earned nominations for the Icelandic Music Award 2010 for Best Album and Best Lyrics.

=== Önnur Mósebók ===
From December 2011 to June 2012, in Reykjavík, Berlin and Amsterdam, the band recorded their sophomore effort, Önnur Mósebók (lit. Second Book of Moses). Magnús Øder again oversaw recording, largely onto analog tape in his Reykjavík studio Orgelsmiðjan, and mixing. The 10-track album found the band taking the debut's original, soulful vibe into more adventurous territory. Owing largely to the popularity of the advance single Stutt skref, which resided at and near the top of local radio charts for the better part of spring and early summer, the new album debuted high in the national charts when released by Record Records in August. The other singles, Sjáum hvað setur and Háa c, both took Moses' chart success a step further, spending 22 weeks on the state radio chart between them, thereof 5 weeks at the top.

=== Fjallaloft ===
On 9 June 2017 Moses Hightower released their third album, Fjallaloft (Mountain air). Mixed and partially co-produced by Styrmir Hauksson, it spawned several successful singles: The title track topped the state radio chart for 3 weeks around the time of the album's release, while Snefill, Feikn and Trúnó spent 28 weeks total on the chart in 2015 and 2016. The fifth single, Mjóddin, was in heavy rotation in August and September 2017, while a live radio recording of the band covering Kate Bush's Wuthering Heights spent a whole month as #1, from mid-November.

=== Lyftutónlist ===
The band’s fourth original album Lyftutónlist (lit. Elevator Music) was released on September 18 2020. Recording and mixing by Styrmir Hauksson, mastering by Glenn Schick and cover design by Sigríður Ása Júlíusdóttir.

== Awards and honors ==
Önnur Mósebók received 7 nominations in 6 categories of the Icelandic Music Awards 2012: Album of the year, Songwriter of the year, Lyricist of the year, Song of the year (Sjáum hvað setur), Steingrímur and Andri as Singer of the year, and Magnús Øder as Producer of the year. Out of these, Moses Hightower ended up taking home the statues for Songwriter of the year and Lyricist of the year.

For Fjallaloft, the band took home the Icelandic Music Awards for Songwriter of the Year 2017, having been nominated for Song of the year (Fjallaloft), Male vocalist of the year (Steingrímur) and Pop album of the year as well.

== Discography ==
- 2010: Búum til börn
- 2012: Önnur Mósebók
- 2013: Mixtúrur úr Mósebók (remix album)
- 2017: Fjallaloft
- 2019: Fjallaloft Live
- 2020: Lyftutónlist

=== Singles ===
- 2008: "Búum til börn"
- 2008: "Upp til að anda"
- 2009: "Bankabókarblús"
- 2009: "101 ósómi"
- 2010: "Vandratað"
- 2010: "Bílalest út úr bænum"
- 2010: "Alltígóðulagi"
- 2012: "Stutt skref"
- 2013: "Ekkert þras" (with Egill Ólafsson, Lay Low and Högni Egilsson)
- 2015: "Snefill"
- 2016: "Feikn"
- 2016: "Trúnó"
- 2017: "Fjallaloft"
- 2017: "Mjóddin"
- 2018: "Ellismellur"
- 2019: "Lyftutónlist"
- 2020: "Stundum"
