= Kelly's Locker =

EP by Sarah Cracknell
- Released: 12 September 2000
- Recorded: 1996–1997
- Genres: Pop, Dance
- Label: Instinct Records
- Producers: Sarah Cracknell; D.O.G. Productions; Stephen Lironi; Warne Livesey; Jeremy Wheatley; Andy Wright

Sarah Cracknell chronology
Lipslide (1997)	Kelly's Locker (2000)	Red Kite (2015)

Professional ratings
Aggregate scores
Source	Rating
Metacritic	60/100
Review scores
Source	Rating
AllMusic	3/5 stars
Pitchfork Media	2.4/10
Alternative Press	4/5 stars

Kelly's Locker is an EP released by Saint Etienne lead singer Sarah Cracknell. Issued by Instinct Records in 2000, the EP served as a companion piece to Cracknell's debut album Lipslide. Four tracks which were on the UK version of Lipslide (but removed for the U.S. release three years later) were included here, as well as the original mix of "Home", shown on Kelly's Locker as the "Armchair Mix". Two previously unreleased songs were also included, as well as a remix of "Anymore" which originally appeared on the 1996 UK single release.

== Track listing ==
All tracks written by Sarah Cracknell, Jonny Male and Guy Batson; except where indicated.

1. "Judy, Don't You Worry" (Cracknell) – 4:44
2. "How Far" – 4:49
3. "Taking Off for France" (Cracknell, Stephen Lironi) – 4:00
4. "Sea Shells" (Isaac Hayes, Joe Shamwell) – 4:22
5. "Home (Armchair Mix)" – 4:18
6. "Taxi" – 3:30
7. "Penthouse Girl, Basement Boy" (Cracknell, Lironi, Henry Priestman) – 4:02
8. "Anymore (Nino's Liquid Steel Mix)" – 5:43
