= Home Counties (album) =

Studio album by Saint Etienne
- Released: 2 June 2017
- Length: 56:20
- Label: Heavenly
- Producer: Augustus; Carwyn Ellis; Shawn Lee; Nick Moon; Saint Etienne; Pete Wiggs

Saint Etienne chronology
Words and Music by Saint Etienne (2012)	Home Counties (2017)	I've Been Trying to Tell You (2021)

Singles from Home Counties
- 1. "Magpie Eyes" Released: 11 April 2017; 2. "Dive" Released: 7 August 2017

Home Counties is the ninth studio album by English alternative dance band Saint Etienne, released on 2 June 2017 by Heavenly Recordings. The album features collaborations with Gerard Johnson, Augustus (also known as Gus Lobban of Kero Kero Bonito) and Nick Moon (of Kyte). The album features production from Shawn Lee, Carwyn Ellis and Richard X.

== Critical reception ==
Professional ratings
Aggregate scores
Source	Rating
Metacritic	79/100
Review scores
Source	Rating
AllMusic	4/5 stars
Clash	6/10
The Guardian	3/5 stars
Mixmag	8/10
Mojo	4/5 stars
The Observer	4/5 stars
Pitchfork	7.6/10
Q	4/5 stars
The Skinny	4/5 stars
Uncut	9/10

Home Counties received generally positive reviews from music critics. At Metacritic, which assigns a normalised rating out of 100 to reviews from mainstream publications, the album received an average score of 79, based on 16 reviews.

== Commercial performance ==
Home Counties debuted at number 31 on the UK Albums Chart, selling 3,215 copies in its first week.

== Track listing ==
All tracks produced by Saint Etienne and Shawn Lee, except where noted.

No.	Title	Writer(s)	Producer(s)	Length
1.	"The Reunion"			0:22
2.	"Something New"	Sarah Cracknell; Bob Stanley; Pete Wiggs		3:17
3.	"Magpie Eyes"	Cracknell; Stanley; Wiggs		3:35
4.	"Whyteleafe"	Cracknell; Stanley; Wiggs; Gus Lobban	Saint Etienne; Lee; Augustus	3:09
5.	"Dive"	Cracknell; Stanley; Wiggs; Carwyn Ellis		4:49
6.	"Church Pew Furniture Restorer"	Cracknell; Stanley; Wiggs		1:53
7.	"Take It All In"	Cracknell; Stanley; Wiggs; Ellis		3:25
8.	"Popmaster"			0:29
9.	"Underneath the Apple Tree"	Cracknell; Stanley; Wiggs		2:35
10.	"Out of My Mind"	Cracknell; Stanley; Wiggs; Lawrence Oakley; Mark Waterfield	Saint Etienne; Lee; Richard X^{[a]}	3:58
11.	"After Hebden"	Cracknell; Stanley; Wiggs; Lobban	Saint Etienne; Lee; Augustus	3:31
12.	"Breakneck Hill"	Cracknell; Stanley; Wiggs		1:39
13.	"Heather"	Cracknell; Stanley; Wiggs; Nick Moon	Wiggs; Lee; Moon	3:58
14.	"Sports Report"			0:12
15.	"Train Drivers in Eyeliner"	Cracknell; Stanley; Wiggs		3:17
16.	"Unopened Fan Mail"	Cracknell; Stanley; Wiggs; Robin Bennett		3:04
17.	"What Kind of World"	Cracknell; Stanley; Wiggs		3:08
18.	"Sweet Arcadia"	Cracknell; Stanley; Wiggs; Gerard Johnson		7:44
19.	"Angel of Woodhatch"	Cracknell; Stanley; Wiggs		2:14

Japanese digital download bonus track
No.	Title	Length
20.	"You Don't Own Me"

=== Notes ===
- ^{^[a]} signifies an additional producer

== Personnel ==
Credits adapted from the liner notes of Home Counties.

=== Saint Etienne ===
- Sarah Cracknell – vocals
- Bob Stanley – keyboards
- Pete Wiggs – keyboards

=== Additional musicians ===
- Shawn Lee – drums, percussion, programming, Maestro Rhythm King, bass, guitars, banjo, vibraphone, Mellotron, Yamaha ED10, Siel synth, Casio CZ101, Yamaha CS-5, Roland MC-202, Crumar Multiman, microKORG, Omnichord, glockenspiel, marimba, tambourine handclaps, backing vocals
- Gerard Johnson – voice (track 1); piano (tracks 1, 2, 15, 18); Fender Rhodes, Hammond organ, Teisco 100P, Yamaha YS100 (tracks 2, 15, 18)
- Carwyn Ellis – bass, guitars, Mellotron, harpsichord, Hammond organ (tracks 5, 7)
- Augustus – programming (tracks 4, 11); Novation Bass Station, Kawai PHm, Yamaha PSR-76 (track 4); Roland MT-32, Korg 101 (track 11)
- Ben Greenslade-Stanton – trombone, trumpet (tracks 2, 5, 9)
- Mark Waterfield – guitar, backing vocals (track 10)
- Lawrence Oakley – programming, Nord Lead 3, backing vocals (track 10)
- Tim Larcombe – bass (track 3)
- James Arben – flute (track 18)
- Ken Bruce – voice (track 8)
- Wolf – voice (track (14)

=== Technical ===
- Shawn Lee – production (all tracks); mixing (tracks 1–9, 11–19)
- Saint Etienne – production (tracks 1–12, 14–19)
- Pierre Duplan – engineering (all tracks); mixing (tracks 1–9, 11–19)
- Carwyn Ellis – production (tracks 5, 7)
- Augustus – production (tracks 4, 11)
- Richard X – additional production, mixing (track 10)
- Pete Wiggs – production (track 13)
- Nick Moon – production (track 13)
- Guy Davie – mastering at Electric Mastering (London)

=== Artwork ===
- Scott King – art, design
- Rhys Atkinson – art assistance, design assistance
- Dee Noble – photography

== Charts ==
Chart performance for Home Counties
Chart (2017)	Peak position
Belgian Albums (Ultratop Flanders)	190
Belgian Albums (Ultratop Wallonia)	97
Scottish Albums (OCC)	22
Spanish Albums (PROMUSICAE)	86
UK Albums (OCC)	31
UK Independent Albums (OCC)	3
US Heatseekers Albums (Billboard)	21
