= People Gonna Talk =

Studio album by James Hunter
- Released: March 7, 2006
- Genres: Blue-eyed soul, jazz, blues
- Label: Go/Rounder
- Producer: Liam Watson

James Hunter chronology
| Kick It Around (2001) | People Gonna Talk (2006) | The Hard Way (2008) |

Singles from People Gonna Talk
- 1. "People Gonna Talk" b/w "Riot in My Heart" Released: July 24, 2006; 2. "Mollena" Released: 2006

Professional ratings
Review scores
| Source | Rating |
|---|---|
| Allmusic | link |
| Down Beat | 3.5/5 stars |
| Mojo | link |
| Q | 4/5 stars |
| Rolling Stone | link |
| Stylus | C link |

People Gonna Talk is the third album by English singer-songwriter James Hunter, released on March 7, 2006. The album charted at number one on the Billboard Top Blues Albums chart. The album reached the top ten in Mojo magazine's Albums Of 2006 critics polls. It was also nominated for the Grammy Award for Best Traditional Blues Album of the Year. Two singles were released from the album in the U.S., "People Gonna Talk" and "Mollena".

== Track listing ==
All songs written by James Hunter.

1. "People Gonna Talk" – 3:18
2. "No Smoke Without Fire" – 3:05
3. "You Can't Win" – 2:31
4. "Riot in My Heart" – 4:16
5. "'Till Your Fool Comes Home" – 2:30
6. "Mollena" -2:33
7. "I'll Walk Away" – 4:07
8. "Watch & Chain" – 3:19
9. "Kick It Around" – 1:59
10. "Don't Come Back" – 2:37
11. "It's Easy to Say" – 3:48
12. "Tell Her For Me" – 1:53
13. "Talking 'Bout My Love" – 2:22
14. "All Through Cryin'" – 2:35

== Personnel ==
- James Hunter – guitar, vocals
- Lee Badau – baritone saxophone
- Damian Hand – tenor saxophone, string arrangements
- Jonathan Lee – percussion, drums
- Vicky Matthews – organ
- Tom Morgan – piano
- Gavin Whitlock – baritone saxophone

=== Guest musicians ===
- Ellen Blair – viola
- Gill Morley – violin
- Carwyn Ellis – organ

=== Production ===
- Liam Watson – Producer, engineer, Mixing
- Harry Benson – Photography
- Noel Summerville – Mastering
