= Simon Scott =

Simon Scott may refer to:

- Simon Scott (actor) (1920–1991), American character actor
- Simon Scott (drummer) (born 1971), English drummer, formerly of Slowdive and Lowgold
- Simon Scott (painter) (1966–2014), British artist and musician

== See also ==
- Scott (name)
