= Please Don't Hate Me =

Studio album by Lay Low
- Released: 19 October 2006
- Recorded: In Lay Low's living room
- Genre: Blues, country, rock
- Length: 37:44
- Label: COD Music
- Producer: Magnús Øder and Lovísa Elísabet

Please Don't Hate Me is the debut album by Icelandic singer and composer Lay Low. It was released on 19 October 2006 by the label COD Music and peaked at #2 on the Icelandic album chart. Two singles have been released from the album, the title track, which has been made into video, and Boy Oh Boy. It has sold over 10,000 units and has been awarded platinum in Iceland.

According to The Reykjavík Grapevine, the album "[didn't] sound like a debut at all, but the work of an experienced artist".

== Track listing ==
All songs and lyrics by Lovísa Elísabet Sigrúnardóttir.

1. Mojo Love − 2:54
2. Home − 2:55
3. Boy Oh Boy − 3:21
4. I'll Try − 2:36
5. Please Don't Hate Me − 2:45
6. Too Late − 3:55
7. Bye Babe − 3:46
8. Mama − 2:53
9. Wonderplace − 4:13
10. Beauty − 3:22
11. Chucker − 5:06

== Credits ==
- Lovísa Elísabet Sigrúnardóttir (producer) − vocals, acoustic guitar
- Magnús Árni Øder Kristinsson (producer) - farfisa, slide guitar, synthesizers, bass guitar, keyboards
- Bassi Ólafsson - drums / percussion
- Sigurbjörn Már Valdimarsson - banjo
