= Simon Scott (painter) =

Simon (John) "Scotty" Scott (20 October 1966 – 8 August 2014) was a British artist and musician, who played rock, punk, soul and country and specialized in a variety of media including commercial art, fine art and street art. His paintings and graphic artwork can be found throughout lower Manhattan. He has designed artwork for many of New York City's restaurants, clubs and bars.

== Biography ==
Simon Scott was born in Peterlee in County Durham in Northern England on 20 October 1966. He attended Our Lady of the Rosary Infants and Junior School before attending St Bede's RC Comprehensive School. At 16, he moved to London and began working as a musician, singing and playing guitar in a number of bands around the city, where he absorbed a wide range of musical influences. He formed his first band, Hooker, with childhood friend Terry Kirkbride in the early 1990s, signing to the newly relaunched Regal Recordings and releasing the first ever single on the new incarnation of the label, when "Cheap Watch" was released on 7" vinyl-only format in 1995. Later, he and Kirkbride, along with fellow County Durham native Colin Murray "Gem" Archer, who went on to play rhythm guitar for Oasis, and Welsh musician Carwyn Ellis, formed Southern Fly. Scott honed his sound as Southern Fly maintained a busy touring schedule through bars and nightclubs in London and other European cities. Scott also sang for a band called The Soul Winners, and another called The Edge, founded by Archer. In 2001, Scott moved to New York City, where he lived in Spanish Harlem, writing songs and working as a chef. In early 2006, he recorded an album, Rhythm Guitar, Shakers and Tambourines, in Oxford, Mississippi. Musicians appearing on this record include Cody and Luther Dickinson (North Mississippi Allstars) and Ellis (Colorama). Back in New York, Scott formed a new band—Simon Scott and the Band of Infidels—which performed frequently throughout the city.

Meanwhile Scott was honing a style of painting that increasingly dominated his focus in the latter years of his life. The same year he recorded "Rhythm Guitar, Shakers and Tambourines", Scott founded East Side Art and Design, a design firm specializing in bespoke and promotional logos, murals, calligraphy, signage and artwork for independent and corporate businesses. Scott fostered collaborations with fellow artists, gallery owners, and corporate clients including Budweiser, Jameson Irish Whiskey, Red Bull and Pernod Ricard.

Towards the end of his life, Bowery Ballroom held a benefit concert to raise money for his cancer treatment. Performers included The Bogmen, Blubba Brothers, Beast Patrol, and Annie Ragz.

New York Magazine's Grubstreet blog wrote that "Chances are that if you've had a pint of beer, maybe more, anywhere around town during the last eight or so years, you've come into direct contact with the work of Simon Scott".

Scott died on Friday 8 August 2014 at the Visiting Nurse Service of New York Haven Hospice Specialty Care Unit at Bellevue Hospital Center in New York City.

== Bibliography ==
- Why You Should Check Out This Sunday’s Benefit for Artist Simon Scott
- Life in Motion: the Unique Art of Simon Scott
- Bands rally for fellow rocker fighting cancer
- Sweet Relief Musicians Fund: Concert For Scotty: All-Star Concert to Benefit Simon Scott
- Simon Scott's Tumblr portfolio
- Simon Scott's Lullaby on Vimeo.
