= Nic Armstrong & The Thieves =

- Origin: Newcastle-Upon-Tyne, England
- Genres: Alternative rock
- Years active: 2004–present
- Labels: One Little Indian; New West Records
- Members: Nic Armstrong
- Website: Official Website

Nic Armstrong & The Thieves are an English rock band founded by Nic Armstrong, and perceived to be inspired by the blues and the rock music of the 1960s, particularly bands such as the Beatles, the Rolling Stones, and the Kinks. Nic Armstrong's The Greatest White Liar was released in April 2004 by One Little Indian Records and subsequently re-released in 2005 under the moniker Nic Armstrong & The Thieves to illustrate that his live show featured a full band. The US version was released on 8 March 2005 by New West Records and included a cover of "I Want to Be Your Driver," originally by Chuck Berry. The album was produced at Toe Rag Studios by Grammy Award-winning British record producer Liam Watson, who has also worked on albums for the White Stripes, the Zutons, and the Kills.

All tracks on The Greatest White Liar were written and composed by Nic Armstrong, with the exception of "Down Home Girl" and "I Want to Be Your Driver". Armstrong played the majority of the instruments and all vocals found on the recordings, with the exception of one backing vocal overdub. Jonny Aitken performed on drums.

"She Changes Like The Weather" & "Back In That Room" was selected by THQ and Pandemic Studios, both now defunct, to feature in the soundtrack of Destroy All Humans! 2. The song was also featured in the film, Moving McAllister. "Down Home Girl" was featured in a Honda Ridgeline commercial during Super Bowl XL. The music video for "Broken Mouth Blues" was directed by Duncan Jones.

In 2004, Paul Weller invited Armstrong to open solo for him on his European tour, shortly after this Nic Armstrong & The Thieves joined Weller on a full UK tour. The band made its US debut at SXSW and US network television debut on The Late Late Show with Craig Ferguson in 2005, followed by performances at the Coachella Festival and Austin City Limits Music Festival. Oasis invited the band on a North American tour during the summer of 2005, which led Noel Gallagher to comment on the band's live show, "if they get their hair cut, they'll be one of the biggest bands in Britain. They're pretty special, man..."

In 2006, under the band name, IV Thieves, New West Records released the album, If We Can't Escape My Pretty (titled after a limited edition Nic Armstrong song that was featured on a limited edition Dazen and Confused flexi-disk).

Armstrong has worked on new material for both projects, his solo career and Nic Armstrong & The Thieves. There are no plans for any further IV Thieves release.

Nic Armstrong is a British singer-songwriter, musician, painter and public artist. After writing and recording The Greatest White Liar album he founded the band Nic Armstrong & The Thieves, and released Nic Armstrong & The Thieves' Pocketless Shirt EP in November 2013.

The six-track Pocketless Shirt EP was released in November 2013. The six-track album was recorded at Cacophony Recorders in Austin, TX with Grammy Award winner, Erik Wofford.

Negative Slant EP was released in November 2015.

Nic Armstrong & The Thieves have worked on a second album.
