= Lay Low (musician) =

Icelandic musician (born 1982)

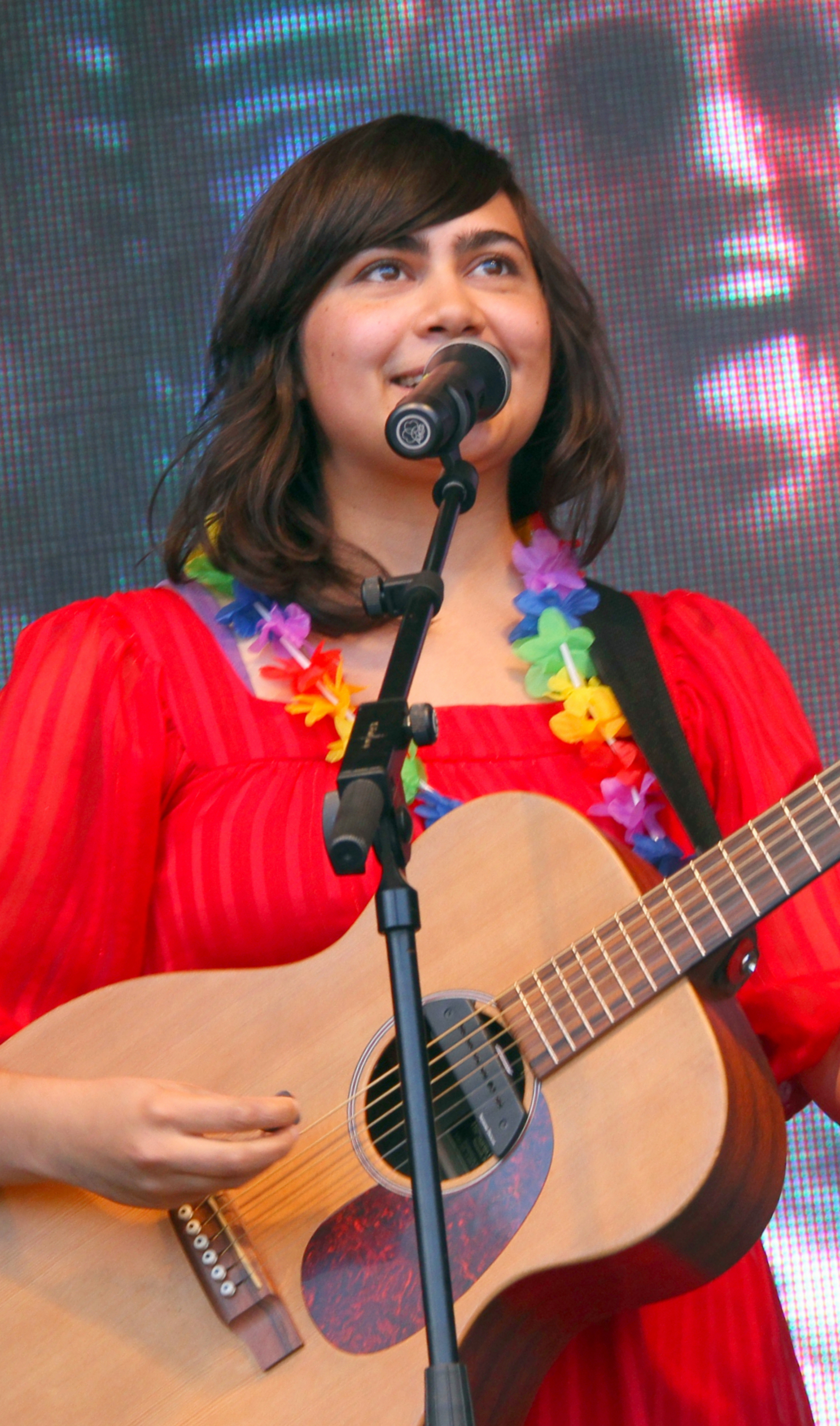
- Lay Low in 2011

Background information
- Birth name: Lovísa Elísabet Sigrúnardóttir
- Born: 10 September 1982 (age 42); London, England
- Origin: Iceland
- Genres: Alternative country; folk; blues; rock
- Instruments: Vocals; guitar; bass; piano; banjo
- Years active: 2006–present
- Labels: Cod Music (Iceland exclusive)
- Website: laylow.is

Lovísa Elísabet Sigrúnardóttir (born 10 September 1982), better known by her stage name, Lay Low, is an Icelandic musician and singer.

== Biography ==
Lovísa was born to a Sri Lankan father and an Icelandic mother. She moved to Iceland at a young age where she has lived since. As a child she began taking piano lessons but started playing electric bass and guitar in her teens, and has since then played with numerous local bands. She joined the band Benny Crespo's Gang playing keyboards/synthesizers and guitar. It was then when she first started to use her voice.

Lay Low, the alter ego of Lovísa, started to evolve early in 2006. She was spotted by a local label, Cod Music, which contacted her and showed an interest in a raw demo song she had published on MySpace. Her music combines elements of blues, folk and country.

It was a rapid rise in the music scene for Lovísa. Just a few months after her discovery she released her debut album, Please Don't Hate Me, which went gold only two months after its release. The following year she was nominated for four of the 2006 Icelandic Music Awards, winning two; Best female singer and best album cover. She was also voted by the nation through phone election as the most popular artist of 2006.

In 2007 she was offered a role in the play Ökutímar by Leikfélag Akureyrar, writing both original songs for the play and performing covers of Dolly Parton songs. The play was a huge success and the following year saw the release of the soundtrack from the play, as well as winning the Gríman award for best music in a play. She also worked with Icelandic musician KK, performing songs for the Baltasar Kormákur film Brúðguminn, as well as releasing an album with Benny Crespo's Gang.

In mid-2008 Lovísa spent some time in London recording her third solo album, Farewell Good Night's Sleep, released on 16 October the same year. The album was recorded at Toerag Studios and produced by Liam Watson.

Lovísa toured extensively in 2009, mostly supporting Emiliana Torrini in Europe and USA along with headlining shows all over the world. She also performed at festivals such as Glastonbury, End of the Road Festival and Into The Great Wide Open. The same year, Lay Low and a film crew recorded Flatey, a live CD/DVD performance on the tiny island of Flatey, which was released in September.

On 4 November 2009 the movie December, a film by Hilmar Oddsson, was premiered. Lovísa played one of the leading roles in the film among renowned Icelandic actors Tómas Lemarquis, Laufey Elíasdóttir and Stefán Hallur Stefánsson. This was her first time acting for a film.

The year 2010 for Lovísa started off with touring far from her home, traveling to Australia and Tokyo with Emiliana Torrini. And in the spring again she got the opportunity to work in the film industry by lending and writing a few of her songs for the film King's Road (Kóngavegur).

In 2012 Lovísa supported Of Monsters and Men on their United States tour.

== Discography ==
=== Albums ===
Solo

- Please Don't Hate Me (2006)
- Ökutímar soundtrack (2008)
- Farewell Good Night's Sleep (2008)
- Flatey (CD + DVD) (2009)
- Brostinn strengur (2011)
- Live at Home (2013)
- Talking About the Weather (2015)

with Benny Crespo's Gang

- Benny Crespo's Gang (2007)

=== Singles ===
- "Ekkert þras" (2013) (with Egill Ólafsson, Moses Hightower and Högni Egilsson)
- "Taktu númer og bíddu við" (with Björgvin Halldórsson) (2013) (from Björgvin Halldórsson album Duet 3
- "Gently" (2013)
- "Þannig týnist tíminn" (2014) (with Ragnar Bjarnason) (from joint album Dúettar)
