= Red Kite (album) =

Studio album by Sarah Cracknell
- Released: 15 June 2015
- Genre: Indie pop
- Length: 36:56
- Label: Cherry Red
- Producer: Carwyn Ellis; Seb Lewsley; Mason Neely

Sarah Cracknell chronology
Lipslide (1997)	Red Kite (2015)

Red Kite is the second solo studio album by British singer-songwriter Sarah Cracknell. It was released on 15 June 2015 via Cherry Red Records. Produced by Carwyn Ellis, Sebastian Lewsley and Mason Neely, it features guest appearances from Nicky Wire and The Rails. The album peaked at number 49 on the UK Albums Chart.

== Critical reception ==
Professional ratings
Aggregate scores
Source	Rating
AnyDecentMusic?	7.5/10
Metacritic	75/100
Review scores
Source	Rating
AllMusic	3.5/5 stars
Clash	7/10
God Is in the TV	8/10
musicOMH	3.5/5 stars
Pitchfork	7.1/10
Record Collector	3/5 stars
The Guardian	4/5 stars
The Irish Times	4/5 stars
The Observer	4/5 stars

Red Kite was met with generally favorable reviews from music critics. At Metacritic, which assigns a normalized rating out of 100 to reviews from mainstream publications, the album received an average score of 75, based on ten reviews. The aggregator AnyDecentMusic? has the critical consensus of the album at a 7.5 out of 10, based on eleven reviews.

== Track listing ==
No.	Title	Writer(s)	Length
1.	"On the Swings"	Sarah Cracknell; Carwyn Ellis	3:50
2.	"Nothing Left to Talk About" (featuring Nicky Wire)	Cracknell; Lawrence Oakley; Mark Waterfield	2:51
3.	"In the Dark"	Cracknell; Ellis	3:53
4.	"Ragdoll"	Cracknell; Robin Bennett	3:01
5.	"Underneath the Stars"	Cracknell; Noah Kelly	3:14
6.	"Hearts Are for Breaking"	Cracknell; Oakley; Waterfield	3:00
7.	"Take the Silver" (featuring The Rails)	Cracknell; Bennett	2:31
8.	"The Mutineer"	Ian McCutcheon	3:25
9.	"I Close My Eyes"	Cracknell; Ellis; Pete Wiggs	3:05
10.	"It's Never Too Late"	Cracknell; Ellis	2:46
11.	"I Am Not Your Enemy"	Cracknell; Ellis	3:10
12.	"Favourite Chair"	Cracknell; Ellis	2:10
Total length:			36:56

== Charts ==
Chart (2015)	Peak position
Scottish Albums (OCC)	60
UK Albums (OCC)	49
UK Independent Albums (OCC)	4
