= Clocks (British band) =

English indie pop band

- Origin: Surrey, England
- Genres: Indie pop
- Years active: 2000–2008
- Labels: Island Records; Hungry Kid Records
- Past members: Tom Hewitt; Ed Hilliam; Rich Farris; John Ricketts
- Website: http://www.clocksband.com/ http://www.myspace.com/clocks

Clocks were an English indie pop band, formed in Epsom & Ewell (just outside London) in 2000. After deciding in 2005 to take music seriously, they spent their university vacations gigging and recording. They have recorded with Liam Watson (The White Stripes, Supergrass, Madness) and on 14 August 2006 released their debut single, "That Much Better" on Hungry Kid Records. This was enough to convince Island Records to sign them up to a recording contract that week.

The band spent time in 2007 recording tracks with record producer, John Cornfield (Razorlight, Supergrass, Muse), and have recorded their début album for Island Records with producer Eliot James (Bloc Party), which had been scheduled for release in Summer 2008. The album was leaked through several P2P sites on 13 July, without even having a title.

After eighteen months on Island Records, in which time they had completed five UK tours and recorded an album's worth of material, they parted company with the label. The band have cited the 2008 financial crisis as the primary reason. Clocks had been forced to pull their UK headline tour in May 2008 after only one show, due to lack of financial support from the record label. Although promotional copies of the debut album, tentatively titled 'Miniskirts & Cigarettes', were issued, it remains commercially unreleased.

== Members ==
- Tom Hewitt – lead vocals, guitars, keyboards
- Ed Hilliam – vocals, lead guitar
- Rich Farris – drums, vocals
- John Ricketts – bass

== Discography ==
- "That Much Better" (14 August 2006) – Hungry Kid Records
- "All I Can" (7 January 2008) – Island Records
- "Old Valve Radio" (14 April 2008) – Island Records

== Touring ==
Clocks undertook three UK tours; November 2006, February 2007 (with Grace) and September/October 2007 (with The Departure). The band have also played one-off shows with The Fray and The Feeling. In 2008 they went on tour to support Scouting For Girls.

Clocks played at the Glastonbury Festival in 2007 in the Orange Tent.
