= The Kaisers =

Scottish rock band

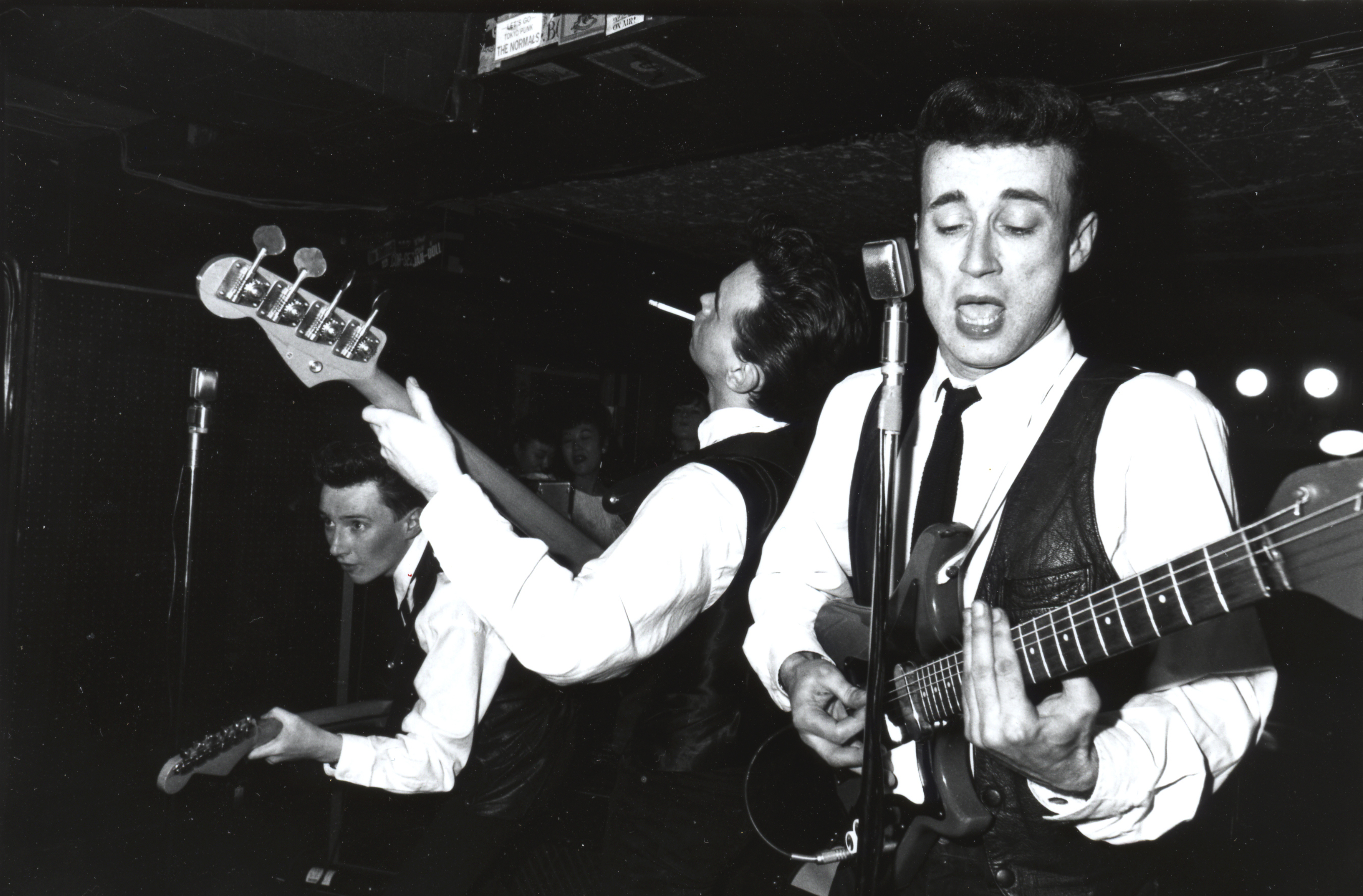
- The Kaisers performing in Japan.

Background information
- Origin: Edinburgh, Scotland, United Kingdom
- Genres: Beat; garage rock; rock and roll
- Years active: 1992–2002 2015 - present
- Labels: No Hit; Get Hip
- Past members: George Miller; Johnny Maben; Matt Armstrong; John Gibbs; Matt Curtis; Mark Ferrie; Keith Warwick; Angus McIntyre; Dean Micetich

The Kaisers are a Scottish rock band formed in 1992 in Edinburgh, Scotland. Heavily influenced by the sounds of 1950s and 1960s rock and roll and R&B, the band recorded several albums and singles under a number of record labels, including No-Hit Records, Bedrock Records, Wild Wild Records and Get Hip Records. Members have been associated with The Wildebeests, The Masonics, Holly Golightly and The Bristols and Janey And The Ravemen

== Imperial Wireless years ==
=== Formation and first recordings (1992-1995) ===
The Kaisers began as the Hitsville Greaseguns playing early rock and roll classics and after a few years they replaced their original drummer Paul with Johnny Maben from the Psychobilly band Radium Kats and they adapted their sound further, they established themselves as a band in Edinburgh, Scotland, in 1992. The band subsequently released a record on the label No Hit and began working with the music producer Liam Watson at Toe Rag Studios in Shoreditch, London, where they quickly released their first album, Squarehead Stomp!, in 1993.

Not long after the promotion of their first record, they made several television appearances—including a spot on the NB Television Show in Scotland. In 1994, In Step With The Kaisers was released, plus an EP called Alligator Twist, which included tracks that were not featured on either of the previous albums. To promote the record they appeared on a BBC Radio Scotland program special reviewing The Beatles Biopic Backbeat film. It was on the radio show the Usual Suspects that Miller stated, "We're not The Beatles; we're not Gerry & The Pacemakers, we're The Kaisers." The Kaisers also recorded two numbers for the program, "Soldier Of Love" and "Money (That's What I Want)", at the BBC Scotland studios.

=== Cracks emerge ===
By this point, problems had arisen and bassist John Gibbs had left, formed the Wildebeests, played with Holly Golightly then joined the Masonics. The band appointed Matt Curtis as bass player just in time for their appearance on Wire TV for an Edinburgh Festival TV special. A few months later The Kaisers were back in the studio with Watson recording Beat It Up! - arguably their best album and what some people would consider to be The Kaisers at their apex. Beat It Up! gathered a storm in the underground market and led to The Kaisers' first US tour, their biggest achievement to date. The tour led to a show at the punk rock club CBGB's.

Following another TV appearance for the Good Morning Breakfast Show in the UK and a few appearances around the country, the Kaisers suffered another departure, when Matt Armstrong left on sabbatical. Keith Warwick took his place before a trip to Alkmaar in 1995. There was also a short tour of Japan with the Death Dealers, soon to become the Neatbeats. Matt Curtis also left soon after in 1995 before being replaced by Mark Ferrie.

== Get Hip years ==
=== Second US tour ===
Following further personnel changes, only two original members remained—George Miller and Johnny Maben. Even though the band's most prolific years had passed, the pair soldiered on with a new album, Wishing Street, and a second US tour. The band's momentum had faltered and the members were involved in side projects. Furthermore, Maben's relocation to London made it inconvenient for the band to record and rehearse. The Kaisers seemed to be recovering when the band was interviewed on The Mark Radcliffe Studio on BBC Radio 2 in 1996. Five tracks were recorded live for the program and the band also appeared on the John Peel show that same year.

During the early stage of the band's career, The Kaisers recorded three albums, two extended players (EPs) and two singles over three years. In the period following 1996 the band's work rate slowed down, and The Kaisers recorded two studio albums and a Christmas single over six years (these were not recorded at Toe Rag Studios or produced by Liam Watson, but were instead recorded at Chamber Studios in Edinburgh). By the time of the release of Shake Me! in 2002, the band was no longer functional. While an official disbandment announcement was not made, the members of the band did not work together again for 15 years.

== Resurgence ==
=== Festival appearances ===
In 2015, the Kaisers were offered the headline slot at Surforama Festival in Valencia and since then have played numerous festivals across Europe.

=== New single releases ===
Spanish label Sleazy Records have issued two new Kaisers 45s: Monkey Train/Sugaree and Shakin' & Stompin'/Guillotine Twist.

=== New Album ===
The Kaisers recently completed recording a new album entitled More From The Kaisers, their first of entirely self penned originals, due for release in the latter half of 2024.

== Line-ups ==
1992-1994

George Miller-Lead Guitar
Matt Armstrong-Guitar
John Gibbs-Bass
Johnny Maben-Drums

1994-1995

George Miller-Lead Guitar
Matt Armstrong-Guitar
Matt Curtis-Bass
Johnny Maben-Drums

1995

George Miller-Lead Guitar
Keith Warwick-Guitar
Matt Curtis-Bass
Johnny Maben-Drums

1995-1999

George Miller-Lead Guitar
Angus McIntyre-Guitar
Mark Ferrie-Bass
Johnny Maben-Drums

1999

George Miller-Lead Guitar
Matt Armstrong-Guitar
Mark Ferrie-Bass
Johnny Maben-Drums

1999

George Miller-Lead Guitar
Dean Micetich-Guitar
Mark Ferrie-Bass
Johnny Maben-Drums

1999-2002

George Miller-Lead Guitar
Matt Armstrong-Guitar
Angus McIntyre-Guitar
Mark Ferrie-Bass
Johnny Maben-Drums

2015-Present

George Miller-Lead Guitar
Angus McIntyre-Guitar
Mark Ferrie-Bass
Johnny Maben-Drums

== Discography ==
- Squarehead Stomp! (1993)
- In Step with the Kaisers (1994)
- Beat It Up! (1995)
- Wishing Street (1997)
- Twist with the Kaisers (1999)
- Shake Me! (2002)
- Ruff'n'Rare (2018)
- More from The Kaisers (2024)
