= Solu Music =

American record label

- Origin: New York City, U.S.
- Genres: House
- Years active: 1998–present
- Labels: Solu Music
- Members: Howie Caspe; Dano Nathanson

Solu Music is a New York-based record label and house music producing duo created by Howie Caspe and Dano Nathanson.

Solu Music are best known for their song "Fade" with KimBlee. Recorded in 2001 and initially released as an underground track, Fade was released as a single in 2006 and became a minor hit in several countries. It is featured on numerous house music compilations.

== Discography ==
Singles

- Fade (2001)
- Afrika (2001)
- The Way I'll Feel (If You Touch) (2002)
- Love Come Around (2003)
- Can't Help Myself (2004)
- Can't Help Myself (Remixes) (2004)
- This Time (2004)
- It Ain't Love (2005)
- Let It Flow (Fudge Mixes) / Tenement (2006)

EP's

- A Night at the Barracuda E.P. (2003)

Albums

- Affirmation (2004)

== Chart success ==
Year	Song	Peak chart positions			
Year	Song	FIN	UK	POR	IRE
2006	Fade	17	18	19	35
