= Lipslide =

Studio album by Sarah Cracknell
- Released: 4 May 1997
- Recorded: 1996–1997
- Genre: Pop; dance
- Label: Gut Records (UK); Virgin (Europe); EMI Music Japan (Japan); Instinct Records (US)
- Producer: Sarah Cracknell; Guy Batson; Ian Catt; D.O.G. Productions; Stephen Hague; Stephen Lironi; Warne Livesey; Johnny Male; Dom T; Jeremy Wheatley; Andy Wright

Sarah Cracknell chronology
Lipslide (1997)	Kelly's Locker (2000)

Professional ratings
Review scores
Source	Rating
AllMusic	4/5 stars
NME	6/10
Uncut	3/5 stars
Wall of Sound	72/100

Lipslide is the debut solo album from Saint Etienne lead singer Sarah Cracknell. The album was co-produced by Cracknell and a variety of producers and released in the UK by Gut Records in 1997. Upon its release Lipslide earned favorable reviews from music critics, although it was not a commercial success. Musically the album does not stray too far from Cracknell's work with Saint Etienne, as it contains electronic and indie-styled pop music.

Lipslide was not released in the United States until 2000. Licensed to Instinct Records, the album's cover art and track list were altered – four tracks were removed and replaced by four new songs. Additionally, the song "Home" was presented in a different mix. These four missing songs and the original version of "Home" were later included on the Kelly's Locker EP, released in 2000 by Instinct.

"Anymore" was released as a single in the UK prior to the album, peaking at number thirty-nine in the UK Singles Chart in 1996. "Desert Baby" was also released but did not chart.

== Track listing ==
All tracks are written by Sarah Cracknell, Johnny Male and Guy Batson, except where indicated.

Original UK edition
No.	Title	Writer(s)	Length
1.	"Ready or Not"		4:42
2.	"Desert Baby"	Cracknell, Stephen Lironi	4:24
3.	"Coastal Town"	Cracknell, Mick Bund	4:01
4.	"Home"		4:18
5.	"Anymore"		3:47
6.	"How Far"		4:49
7.	"Goldie"		5:02
8.	"Taxi"		3:31
9.	"Taking Off for France"	Cracknell, Lironi	4:00
10.	"If You Leave Me"	Cracknell, Ian Catt	4:04
11.	"Penthouse Girl, Basement Boy"	Cracknell, Lironi, Henry Priestman	4:01
12.	"Can't Stop Now"	Cracknell, Mark Waterfield	4:55

European edition
No.	Title	Writer(s)	Length
10.	"Empire State High"		3:37
11.	"If You Leave Me"	Cracknell, Catt	4:04
12.	"Penthouse Girl, Basement Boy"	Cracknell, Lironi, Priestman	4:01
13.	"Can't Stop Now"	Cracknell, Waterfield	4:55

Japanese edition
No.	Title	Writer(s)	Length
1.	"Ready or Not"		4:42
2.	"Desert Baby"	Cracknell, Lironi	4:24
3.	"Downtown" (Petula Clark cover)	Tony Hatch	3:08
4.	"Coastal Town"	Cracknell, Bund	4:01
5.	"Home"		4:18
6.	"Anymore"		3:47
7.	"How Far"		4:49
8.	"Goldie"		5:02
9.	"Taxi" (alternate version)		3:58
10.	"Taking Off for France"	Cracknell, Lironi	4:00
11.	"If You Leave Me"	Cracknell, Catt	4:04
12.	"Empire State High"		3:37
13.	"Penthouse Girl, Basement Boy"	Cracknell, Lironi, Priestman	4:01
14.	"Can't Stop Now"	Cracknell, Waterfield	4:55
15.	"Oh Boy, The Feeling When You Held My Hand"	Cracknell, Feld	4:11
16.	"Fifth Floor"	Cracknell, Lironi, Catt	4:40
17.	"Aussie Soap Girl"		3:46

US edition
No.	Title	Writer(s)	Length
1.	"Anymore"		3:48
2.	"Home" (US mix)		3:28
3.	"Ready or Not"		4:41
4.	"Desert Baby"	Cracknell, Lironi	4:24
5.	"Goldie"		5:03
6.	"Oh Boy, The Feeling When You Held My Hand"	Cracknell, Feld	4:13
7.	"Coastal Town"	Cracknell, Bund	4:01
8.	"Aussie Soap Girl"		3:48
9.	"4 Months, 2 Weeks"	Cracknell, Catt	5:24
10.	"Can't Stop Now"	Cracknell, Waterfield	4:57
11.	"Fifth Floor"	Cracknell, Catt	4:41
12.	"If You Leave Me"	Cracknell, Catt	4:02
13.	"Anymore" (enhanced CD video)

=== Deluxe edition ===
Disc 1 features the original album with a slightly shuffled running order. "Penthouse Girl, Basement Boy" is absent, and the US mix of "Home" appears on disc 1 with the UK original on disc 2.

Disc 2 includes most of the songs found on the Japanese and US editions, as well as eight previously unreleased tracks.

Deluxe edition – Disc 1
No.	Title	Writer(s)	Length
1.	"Ready or Not"		4:41
2.	"Home" (US mix)		3:29
3.	"Coastal Town"	Cracknell, Bund	4:01
4.	"Desert Baby"	Cracknell, Lironi	4:24
5.	"Anymore"		3:48
6.	"How Far"		4:48
7.	"Goldie"		5:04
8.	"Taxi"		3:29
9.	"Taking Off for France"	Cracknell, Lironi	3:57
10.	"If You Leave Me"	Cracknell, Catt	4:05
11.	"Can't Stop Now"	Cracknell, Waterfield	4:58

Deluxe edition – Disc 2
No.	Title	Writer(s)	Length
1.	"Ready or Not" (demo)		3:22
2.	"Can't Stop Now" (demo)	Cracknell, Waterfield	4:29
3.	"What Kind of Love"	Cracknell, Waterfield	3:33
4.	"Fifth Floor"	Cracknell, Catt	4:42
5.	"Aussie Soap Girl"		3:47
6.	"You Just Won Me Over"	Male, Batson	3:47
7.	"Judy Don't You Worry"	Cracknell	4:45
8.	"Sea Shells"	Isaac Hayes, Joe Shamwell	4:22
9.	"Summer Song"	Cracknell, Waterfield	3:26
10.	"Home" (UK album version)		4:18
11.	"Departure Lounge"	Cracknell, Male, Pete Smith	3:59
12.	"Empire State High"		3:36
13.	"Open Your Eyes"	Cracknell, Waterfield, Steve Crittall	3:02
14.	"What Happens Next"	Cracknell, Waterfield, Crittall	3:50
15.	"Miles Apart"	John Head	4:04
