= David Fletcher (musician) =

British musician (1971–2009)

David Eldon Fletcher (10 December 1971 – 29 June 2009) was a British musician and Principal Double Bass of the Royal Liverpool Philharmonic Orchestra and guest Principal Bass of the Norwegian National Opera in Oslo.

He worked with the Royal Philharmonic Orchestra, the London Symphony Orchestra, the BBC National Orchestra of Wales and many others. He was also a member of British Psychedelic folk/rock band Colorama. In 2006 he was made a Fellow of the Royal Academy of Music in recognition of his achievements.

On 29 June 2009, just a days after Colorama's appearance at the Glastonbury Festival, Fletcher died suddenly at the age of 37, from a heart attack suffered in his sleep.

The David Fletcher Memorial Fund was launched in October 2010 to provide support for young double bass players on the cusp of their professional careers.
