= Kyte (band) =

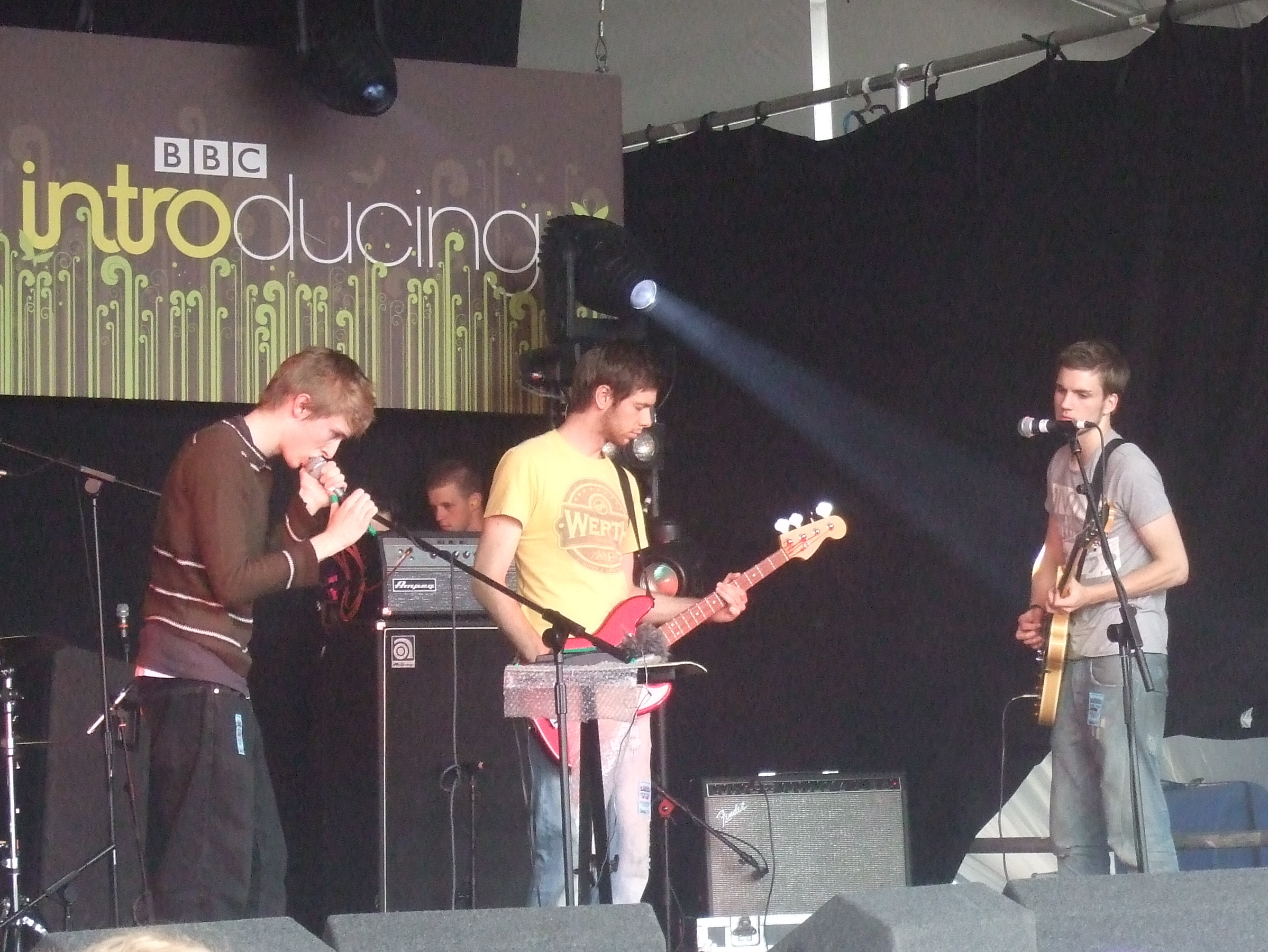
- Kyte at the Latitude Festival in 2008

Background information
- Origin: Leicestershire, England
- Genres: Rock, electronic, Chillwave, Shoegaze, Dream pop, post-rock Ambient pop
- Years active: 2007-present
- Labels: Kids (UK), Erased Tapes (EU), Hostess (JP)
- Members: Nick Moon; Tom Lowe; Scott Hislop

Kyte are an electronic indie pop group, from Leicestershire, England.

Kyte comprise Nick Moon (vocals), Tom Lowe (guitars and keyboards), Scott Hislop (drums and percussion). Their earlier musical output was often labelled shoegazing (or neo-shoegazing) and post rock but they have since moved into a more electro and pop influenced sound. Their debut single, "Planet," was released in 2007 on Sonic Cathedral Recordings, the b-side of which, "Boundaries," was used in a trailer for the television series The Sopranos. Their debut album was released in 2008 on Kids Records (UK) / Erased Tapes Records (EU) to generally positive reviews. In April 2009 they released their second full-length release Science For The Living in Japan. The two disc Japan release featured tracks taken from their 2008 Two Sparks, Two Stars EP, with the remaining tracks being new material. The bonus disc included a remix from The Joy Formidable of the opening track on Disc 1, "Eyes Lose Their Fire."

The band have toured extensively throughout Europe and Asia as well as appearing at many festivals including the 10th Anniversary Summer Sonic Festival in Japan.

During April 2012 the band travelled to Seattle to work with producer John Goodmanson (Nada Surf, Blonde Redhead, Los Campesinos) at the Robert Lang Studios. Their newest album, titled Love To Be Lost, was released in 2012.

== Dead Waves ==
Dead Waves

Studio album by Kyte
- Released: 19 April 2010
- Genre: Indie pop, electronic, indie rock
- Length: 59:06
- Label: Kids
- Producer: Duncan "Pixie" Mills, Tom Lowe, "Dr" Dave Fawbert

Kyte chronology
Science for the Living (2009)	''Dead Waves'' (2010)	Love To Be Lost (2012)

Dead Waves was released in Japan on 7 April 2010 and in the UK shortly after on, 19 April. The band finished deciding which songs would appear on the album in the first week of December 2009. The mixing of the album was also finished during this period. To celebrate the launch of the album in the UK, a free launch party was held at the Old Blue Last music venue in London on the day of release. The supporting acts were The Strange Death of Liberal England and Rival Consoles, as well as a live DJ set from Maps.

Although it is the second full-length release in the band's discography (excluding the self-titled mini-album), Dead Waves was the first full-length release to be made available outside of Asia and was promoted as the band's "first proper long-player" by their UK based label Kids Records. Several of the songs on the album are new versions of songs that appeared on the band's previous release, Science For The Living.

=== Critical reaction ===
The album received a 7/10 from the British journalism magazine NME. MusicOMH rated it 3/5 finding little development from previous release the Two Sparks, Two Stars EP.

Alter The Press! gave the release a favourable 4.5 out of 5 stars, stating that "its consistency, flowness and craftsmanship is something to be admired."

=== Remix competition ===
In conjunction with the release of Dead Waves, a remix competition was held by the band for their track Ihnfsa. The competition was announced on the band's official MySpace blog on 16 February 2010, the closing date being the 26th of the same month.

Three download links were provided, which were hosted on the Kids Records website and contained the files needed to begin remixing the track. The winning entry was submitted by FILMLOOP and was featured on the IHNFSA EP, which was released as a digital download via iTunes on 19 April 2010. A number of promotional CDr copies were also produced.

=== Track listing ===
No.	Title	Length
1.	"The Smoke Saves Lives"	4:05
2.	"Ihnfsa"	3:44
3.	"You're Alone Tonight"	3:45
4.	"Designed for Damage"	4:16
5.	"Like She Said"	4:31
6.	"Fear from Death"	4:35
7.	"Each Life Critical"	7:41
8.	"No-One is Angry, Just Afraid"	4:42
9.	"The Guns and the Knives"	3:38
10.	"Fake Handshakes, Earnest Smiles"	5:50
11.	"Dead Waves"	7:37
12.	"The Strangest Words and Pictures"	4:42
Total length:		59:06

Bonus Tracks (Japanese Edition)
No.	Title	Length
13.	"I'll Follow Dreams for You"	4:57
14.	"Spoilt to Death"	4:46
15.	"Staging the World"	3:55
16.	"Cassette Culture"	4:24
Total length:		1:17:08

== Discography ==
=== Albums ===
- Kyte (2008)
- Science For The Living (2009)
- Dead Waves (2010)
- Love To Be Lost (2012)

=== EPs ===
- Switch Motion to the Sky (2006)
- Two Sparks, Two Stars (2008)
- Japan Tour EP (2008)
- Designed for Damage (2010)
- IHNFSA (2010)

=== Singles ===
- Planet (2007)
- Boundaries (2008)
- Friend of a Friend (2012)
- Taipei (All At Once) (2013)

=== Compilations ===
- Remix Works (2010)
