= Murry the Hump =

Welsh indie rock band

- Also known as: (The) Keys
- Origin: Aberystwyth, Wales
- Genres: Indie rock, Urban Folk
- Years active: 1999–present
- Labels: Too Pure; See Monkey Do Monkey
- Past members: Matthew Evans; Gwion Rowlands; Tristan Cross; Bill Coyne; Siôn Glyn; Curig Huws
- Website: www.murrythehump.co.uk

Murry the Hump were a Welsh indie rock and "urban folk" band. They were active from 1999 until 2001. Since then they have continued to release music under the name The Keys (or simply Keys).

== History ==
The band was formed in Aberystwyth in the late 1990s by singer Matthew Evans, guitarist Gwion Rowlands, bass guitarist Curig Huws, and drummer Bill Coyne, taking their name from the gangster Llewellyn Morris "Murray The Hump" Humphreys.

Early on in the band's career, they competed in a Battle of the Bands contest against Muse. Garnering early interest by way of indie singles "Green Green Grass of Home" (an NME "Single of the Week", and a song about marijuana rather than a cover of the song made famous by Tom Jones) (Blue Dog/V2) and "Thrown Like a Stone" (Shifty Disco) (which was voted number nine in John Peel's Festive Fifty in 1999), they gained support from BBC Radio 1 DJs Steve Lamacq and John Peel, recording three sessions for the Peel, and secured an appearance at industry showcase In The City. A publishing deal from Townhill Music (Sony) swiftly followed, and the band were heralded as the best new band in Wales, and by Alex James of Blur as the best new band in Britain. Alex James, artist Damien Hirst and the late Joe Strummer preferred Murry the Hump over Coldplay when they saw both acts perform at a record label showcase gig. In a 2000 review of the "Silver Suit" single in the NME, the band were described as "The Proper Indie; winsome, charmsome, delicate, funny and toe-tappin' Trebor fizz-pop Fab".

In 2000 the band signed to Too Pure, whereupon they joined new label mates Hefner on a whistle-stop tour of the UK. The band then began work ontheir debut album, Songs of Ignorance, and performed some of the new material for Radio 1's One Live in Cardiff. Curig was replaced by new bassist Siôn Glyn.

The band's first release for Too Pure, "The House That Used to Be a Ship" (a split single with Hefner), was followed by Guardian Guide single of the Week "Cracking Up", gaining much support from Xfm with a John Kennedy Session and live slots for the station at Camden's Barfly.

A second single for the label, "Don't Slip Up" and the debut album Songs of Ignorance followed. The album was described by Andy Gill in The Independent as displaying "a warmth and charm to the group's jangly indie-pop that's entirely engaging", while the NME's April Long said that it revealed "a canny aptitude not only for hook-laden guitar tricks but also story-telling", describing the band as "somewhere between the bucolic surrealism of Super Furry Animals and the cerebral pop of XTC." The Sunday Times selected "Cracking Up" as one of the 'Tracks of the Year' at the end of 2001, describing it as "Joyous, mad, brief. 2001's perfect pop song, from a great Welsh band"; Their review of Songs of Ignorance from May that year also described the track as "so ripe - it has three different choruses - and so joyous, it makes you want to tear your clothes off and run for the hills."

The band announced that they had split up in September 2001, although they played one final concert in October that year as part of the BBC Radio 2 Live in Cardiff festival. Evans stated in 2003 "it stopped being fun and we found we had to promote things and that's when things started getting quite tense." Evans, Rowlands, and Glyn re-remerged in 2002 as The Keys, after asking fans to choose a name for the new band, and were described as "Duane Eddy jamming with the Jesus and Mary Chain". The band released a self-titled debut album in 2003, two EPs in 2009 and their second album as The Keys, Fire Inside, in 2010. A third album, Bitten by Wolves, was released in 2011. The band, now also known simply as Keys, released the albums Ring the Changes in 2014, Bring Me the Head of Jerry Garcia in 2019. and Home Schooling Album in 2020.

== Trivia ==
- On 26 May 1999 the band supported Tom Jones, Shirley Bassey, the Morriston Orpheus Choir and a host of other Welsh acts in front of 25,000 people for the BBC Voices of a Nation concert.
- Blue Dog single (V2) "The Green Green Grass of Home" was a limited edition of 1,000.
- Murry the Hump have supported The Stereophonics, The Levellers, Bonnie Tyler, Shed Seven, Björn Again, Mike Peters, Coloursound, The Crocketts, Cartoon, Topper, Big Leaves, Deacon Blue and others.

== Discography ==
=== Albums ===
- Songs of Ignorance (28 May 2001), Too Pure Records (Pure 116) - CD and LP

as The Keys

- The Keys (2003), Too Pure
- Fire Inside (2010), See Monkey Do Monkey
- Bitten by Wolves (2011), See Monkey Do Monkey
- Ring the Changes (2014), See Monkey Do Monkey
- Bring Me the Head of Jerry Garcia (2019), Libertino
- Home Schooling Album (2020), Libertino

=== Singles and EPs ===
- Don't Slip Up - Demo (not published)
- "Green Green Grass of Home" (1999), Blue Dog Records - 7" vinyl single, split with Gorgeous Fame and the Three Degrees
- "Thrown Like a Stone"/"Don't Slip Up" (27 September 1999), Shifty Disco Records - CD
- Colouring Book EP (November 1999), Malthouse Records - CD
- "Silver Suit"/"Booze and Cigarettes" (May 2000), Prim and Proper Records - 7" vinyl single
- "The House That Used to Be a Ship" (January 2001), Too Pure Records - 7" vinyl single, split with Hefner
- "Cracking Up" (26 March 2001), Too Pure (Pure 114) - CD and 7" vinyl single
- "Don't Slip Up" (21 May 2001), Too Pure (Pure 107) - CD and 7" white vinyl single

as The Keys

- Le Mans EP (2009), See Monkey Do Monkey
- The Christmas EP (2009), See Monkey Do Monkey

== Peel Sessions ==
The band performed 3 sessions for John Peel over the course of 1999 and 2000, as well as one-off performance as part of a special event for the same host.

- 1 December 1999, Peel Session, Maida Vale 4 (recorded 26 September 1999)
- 29 March 2000, Peel Session, Live from the Union Chapel, London
- 25 October 2000, Peel Session, One Live in Cardiff at Clwb Ifor Bach
- 21 December 2000, John Peel Christmas Special, Live from Peelacres
