= Sarah Cracknell =

English singer-songwriter (born 1967)

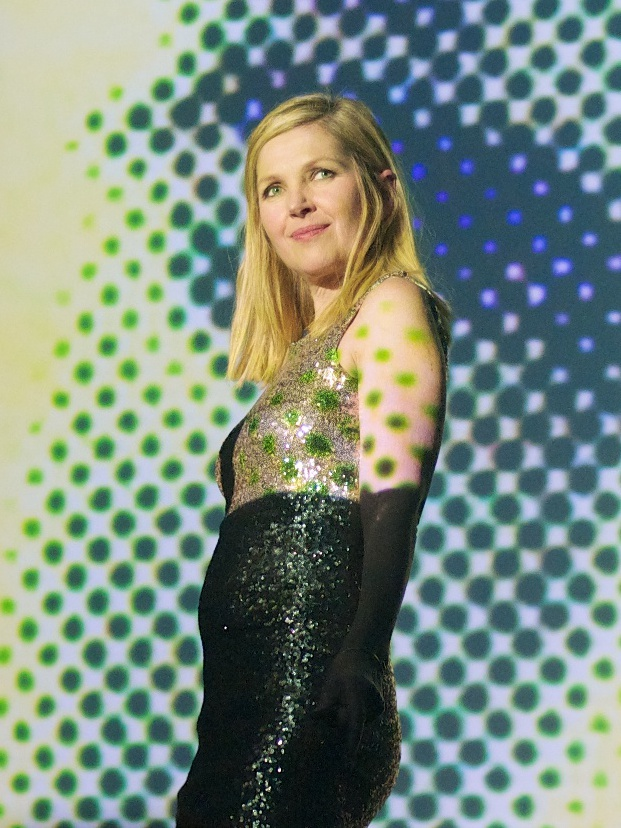
- Cracknell performing in 2012

Background information
- Born: Sarah Jane Cracknell; 12 April 1965 (age 61); Chelmsford, Essex, England
- Genres: House; alternative dance; synthpop; indie pop; alternative rock
- Occupation: Singer-songwriter
- Years active: 1987–present
- Labels: Heavenly; Gut; Instinct; Cherry Red; Virgin
- Member of: Saint Etienne
- Website: Saint Etienne website

Sarah Jane Cracknell (born 12 April 1965) is an English singer-songwriter and lead singer of the electronic music band Saint Etienne.

== Career ==
Cracknell's career started with the Windsor-based indie band The Worried Parachutes in 1982. Following the demise of the band she released two solo singles, "Love Is All You Need" and "Coastal Town", in 1987. With friend Mick Bund, she then formed a new band, Prime Time, who released a handful of singles.

Cracknell was a member of the duo Lovecut DB, which released three singles in 1991 and 1992 including "Heart Spin", "Fingertips" b/w "Live To Breathe" and "Journey To The Centre Of Love".

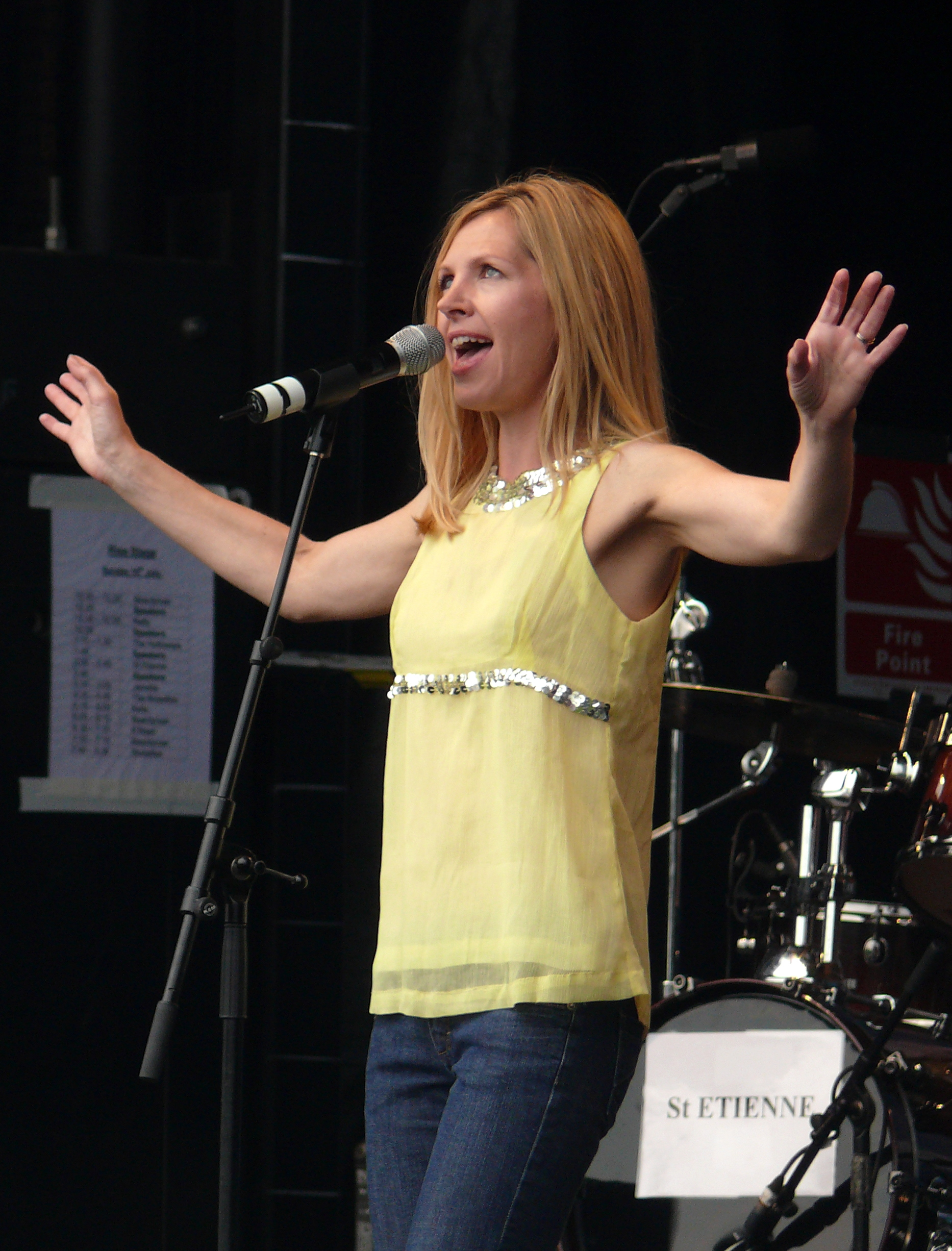
Cracknell performing with Saint Etienne at Rise Festival in London, July 2007

Saint Etienne was originally to be an indie dance act featuring various vocalists. After Moira Lambert sang on their initial 1990 single "Only Love Can Break Your Heart" and Donna Savage was heard on the follow-up single "Kiss and Make Up", Cracknell lent her vocals to "Nothing Can Stop Us" and ended up doing the rest of the singing on their debut album Foxbase Alpha. Cracknell has been Saint Etienne's permanent vocalist since then.

Preceded by the single "Anymore" in 1996, Cracknell released a solo album, Lipslide, in May 1997. Originally released in the UK only by Gut Records, the album featured dance, indie and pop tunes and received good reviews from critics, but was not a big seller (Cracknell has in interviews placed some of the blame on lack of proper promotion by Gut).

Lipslide finally surfaced in the U.S. three years later, when Instinct Records released it in February 2000. With completely different cover art, the original album's track listing was also modified: five tracks were removed and four new songs plus a remix were added. Months later, Instinct released the Kelly's Locker EP, which contained the five tracks originally removed from the UK version of Lipslide, along with two previously unreleased songs and a new remix.

Cracknell was Spiller's first choice for the vocals of his number-one hit "Groovejet (If This Ain't Love)" in 2000, but she never got to record the song, which instead featured Sophie Ellis-Bextor. She has recorded tracks with various artists such as David Holmes ("Anymore", "Gone"), Xploding Plastix ("Sunset Spirals"), Cheapglue ("You've Just Won Me Over") and Paul Van Dyk ("The Riddle (Tell Me Why)," although billed as a collaboration between Van Dyk and St. Etienne but with Cracknell on vocals).

She recorded a duet of Dusty Springfield's 1968 song "I Close My Eyes and Count to Ten" with Marc Almond for his album Stardom Road, released in June 2007.

In December 2007, BBC radio began playing "The Journey Continues" by Mark Brown featuring Cracknell. The song consists of extensive samples from a composition by Elena Kats-Chernin entitled Eliza's Aria, well known to UK TV viewers as the music from the animated 'For the Journey' commercials for Lloyds TSB bank. The single was released in February 2008 on Positiva. The song peaked at #11 in the UK after being released.

Cracknell has collaborated with French pop star Etienne Daho on several occasions. She co-wrote and sang back-up vocals on "Les passagers" from his 1996 album Eden, and also co-wrote "Le premier jour" which was released as a single from his greatest hits compilation Singles. With Saint Etienne, they collaborated on the Reserection EP. Saint Etienne's single "He's on the Phone" (which featured both Cracknell and Daho) was actually an English-language adaptation of Daho's French language 1984 single "Weekend à Rome".

On 21 August 2014, Cherry Red Records announced that it had signed Cracknell to a worldwide deal under which she would release a new solo album. The album, entitled Red Kite, was recorded in December 2014 and released on 15 June 2015. A series of live shows by Cracknell in support the album were planned for the weeks following its release.

== Personal life ==
Cracknell married Martin Kelly (joint managing director of Heavenly Recordings and Heavenly Films) in Kensington and Chelsea, London, on 5 December 2004. They have two children, born in Westminster, London, in 2001 and 2004.

Cracknell is the daughter of Derek Cracknell, an assistant film director, who worked with people such as Stanley Kubrick, and actor and singer Julie Samuel (born 1944).

== Discography ==
Sarah Cracknell discography
- Studio albums: 2
- Compilation albums: 2
- Singles: 10

The discography consists of two studio albums, two compilations, six solo singles and four singles as a featured artist.

=== Albums ===
==== Studio albums ====
Title	Details	Peak chart positions
Title	Details	UK
Lipslide	Released: May 1997, February 2000 (US); Format: Digital download, CD; Label: Gut Records/Honey Lane, Virgin Records, Instinct (US)	—
Red Kite	Released: June 2015; Format: Digital download, CD, vinyl; Label: Cherry Red Records	49
"—" denotes an album that did not chart.

==== Instrumental albums ====
Title	Details
Kites	Released: July 2016; Format: 10" vinyl, digital; Label: Cherry Red Records

==== Compilation albums ====
Title	Details
Kelly's Locker	Released: 12 September 2000; Format: Digital download, CD; Label: Instinct
Lipslide – Deluxe Edition	Released: 12 November 2012; Format: Digital download, CD; Label: Heavenly Records, Universal UMC

=== Singles ===
==== As lead singer ====
Year	Title	Peak chart positions	Album
Year	Title	UK	Album
1987	"Love Is All You Need" / "Coastal Town" (7" single)	—	Non-album singles
1987	"Coastal Town" (12" single)	—	Non-album singles
1996	"Anymore"	39	Lipslide
1997	"Goldie"	—	Lipslide
1997	"Desert Baby"	—	Lipslide
2015	"Nothing Left to Talk About" (featuring Nicky Wire)	—	Red Kite
2015	"Take the Silver"	—	Red Kite
"—" denotes a single that did not chart or was not released in that territory.

==== As featured artist ====
Year	Title	Peak chart positions	Album
Year	Title	UK	Album
1996	"Gone" (David Holmes featuring Sarah Cracknell)	75	This Film's Crap Let's Slash the Seats
2003	"Sunset Spirals" (Xploding Plastix featuring Sarah Cracknell)	—	The Donca Matic Singalongs
2007	"I Close My Eyes and Count to Ten" (Marc Almond featuring Sarah Cracknell)	—	Stardom Road
2007	"The Journey Continues" (Mark Brown featuring Sarah Cracknell)	11	Non-album single
2007	"Growth of Raindrops" (Warm Digits feat. Sarah Cracknell)	—	Wireless World
"—" denotes a single that did not chart or was not released in that territory.

== Guest appearances ==
List of guest appearances, with other performing artists, showing year released and release details
Title	Year	Other artist(s)	Release
"I Fell in Love with a Stranger"	unknown	Inter Nation featuring Sarah Jane	I Fell in Love with a Stranger (promo single)
"Fingertips"	1991	LoveCUT>>DB* featuring Sarah Jane	Fingertips / Live To Breathe (single)
"Supermarket"	1992	Supermarket (aka Denim)	We Are Icerink (compilation)
"Worthless"	1993	Mexico 70	Worthless/ Heaven in Your Eyes (double 'a' side single)
"Les Passagers"	1996	Étienne Daho	Eden (album)
"Tokyo to London"	1997	Hideki Kaji	Mini Skirt (album)
"The Man I Love"	1998	Kid Loco	Red Hot + Rhapsody: The Gershwin Groove (compilation album)
"Week-end à Rome"	1998	Étienne Daho	Singles (compilation album)
"Kissing Things"	1999	The 6ths	Hyacinths & Thistles (album)
"Elysium"	1999	Madness	Wonderful (album)
"Tomorrow's Girl"	2002	Funky Monkey	Join Us in Tomorrow (album)
"You Just Won Me Over"	2002	Cheapglue	You Just Won Me Over (EP)
"The Last Weekend"	2015	Akasha	Hail The Sun (album)
"We Look at the Stars"	2016	Lisbon Kid	We Look at the Stars (digital release)
"Growth of Raindrops"	2017	Warm Digits	Growth of Raindrops (single)
"Do You Like My New Hair?"	2020	The Pre New	Do You Like My New Hair? / In The Perfect Place (EP)
