= Toe Rag Studios =

Former recording studio in London, England

Coordinates: 51.5529°N 0.0410°W

- Type: Private
- Industry: Recording industry
- Genre: Recording studio
- Founded: 1991; Shoreditch, London, England
- Founder: Liam Watson, Josh Collins
- Defunct: 2024
- Headquarters: Hackney, London, England
- Website: http://www.toeragstudios.co.uk/

Toe Rag Studios was an analogue recording studio located in Hackney, London, England.

== History ==
The studio was founded in 1991 by Liam Watson and Josh Collins in the Shoreditch area of London. In 1997, the business relocated to Hackney due to rising overheads. Although the studio didn't open exclusively in the analogue market, it was formed to eventually only use analogue equipment (despite the cost), as "there were loads of [cheap digital studios] opening up all the time and then closing down every week because they didn't really offer anything unique".

== Facilities ==
Toe Rag offers clients music production using eight-track multitrack recording technology, and all recording media is magnetic tape.

=== Equipment ===
Recording is centred on an EMI REDD.17 mixing console (originally from Abbey Road Studios) and Studer A80 tape machine, as well as microphones by Neumann, Reslo and STC. Monitoring is performed through Lockwood Major loudspeakers. Vintage backline includes Vox and Fender amplifiers, and instruments include Farfisa and Hammond organs, as well as a 1965 Ludwig drum kit.

As well as hardware, the studio's live room was specially built to maximise the acoustic properties. In addition to this, the studio makes use of echo chambers.

== Notable clients ==
- A-Bones
- Action Swingers
- Acupuncture Allstars
- ANA
- Nic Armstrong
- The Before & After
- The Bishops
- Billy Childish
- Clocks
- Hugh Cornwell
- The Cribs
- Colorama
- Dan Sartain
- The Datsuns
- Delicatessen (band)
- Didier Wampas & Bikini Machine
- Dog Ugly
- Electric Wizard
- The Ettes
- François Evans
- The Flaming Stars
- Galley Beggar
- Holly Golightly
- The Hugs
- James Hunter
- The Jekylls
- The Kaisers
- The Kills
- The Liberty Takers
- Bobby Long
- Madness
- Metronomy
- Pete Molinari
- My Drug Hell
- The Mystreated
- Neils Children
- Spitfire
- Strip Kings
- Supergrass
- Tame Impala
- Television Personalities
- Temples
- Toybloïd
- Uncle Acid & the Deadbeats
- The Undertones
- Vibrosonic
- The Wave Pictures
- The White Stripes
- Wolf Alice
- The Wytches
- The Zutons
