= Benny Crespo's Gang =

Icelandic alternative rock band

- Origin: Iceland
- Genres: Alternative Rock; Indie Rock
- Members: Bassi Ólafsson; Helgi Rúnar Gunnarsson; Lovísa Elísabet Sigrúnardóttir; Magnús Árni Öder Kristinsson
- Past members: Magnús Guðmundsson

Benny Crespo's Gang is an Icelandic alternative rock band. They released their eponymous debut album in 2007. The group formed in 2003.

== Biography ==
The members of the group are from a village in southern Iceland, Selfoss. The band performed for four years before releasing their first album.

Their first album was released in 2007 and was well received by the Icelandic music scene. The album was nominated for the Icelandic Music Awards in 2008. Along with good reviews in Iceland, they have been getting recognition in the foreign media, such as NME and Clash.

In 2008, the band joined Sign and Dr. Spock for a tour called Rás 2 Rokkar Hringinn. They toured around the country with the support of the national public-service broadcasting radio, RÚV. Benny Crespo's Gang played at the NXNE Festival in Toronto in 2009.

== Discography ==
- Benny Crespo's Gang (2007)
