= AM & Shawn Lee =

British musical duo

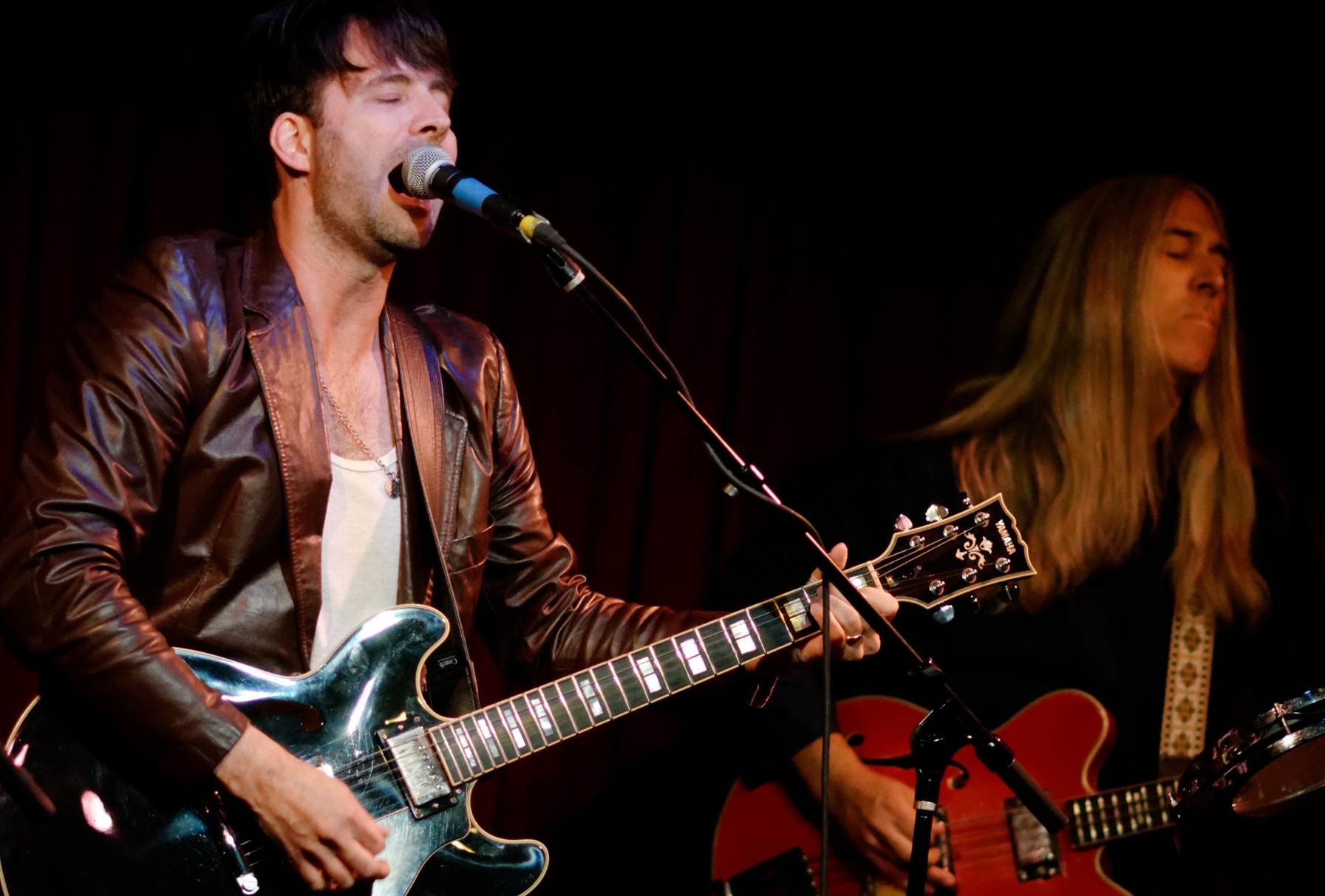
- AM & Shawn Lee in 2013

Background information
- Origin: Los Angeles, London
- Genres: Pop, nu-disco, indie, funk, psychedelic, electronica, ambient, alternative rock, psychedelic pop, indie rock, synthpop, electro, post-punk
- Years active: 2011–present
- Labels: ESL Music, Park the Van, AM Sounds, and Secret Process Records
- Members: AM; Shawn Lee
- Website: www.amsounds.com

AM & Shawn Lee are a musical duo based in Los Angeles and London and composed of producer, DJ, and songwriter AM and producer and multi-instrumentalist Shawn Lee.

== Discography ==
=== Albums ===
- Celestial Electric (2011)
- La Musique Numérique (2013)
- Outlines (2015)

=== Music videos ===
- "Dark Into Light": created and directed by A Bigger Plan
- "Good Blood": created and directed by A Bigger Plan

== Radio ==
- regular rotation airplay on KCRW’s Morning Becomes Eclectic, New Ground, and the nationally syndicated Sounds Eclectic
- performed live on KCRW's Morning Becomes Eclectic with Jason Bentley
- performed live on KEXP, #11 at KEXP

== Awards and achievements ==
The song "Two Times," from AM & Shawn Lee's album La Musique Numérique, was named “Song of the Day” by KEXP on August 23, 2013, and "Dark Into Light," from Celestial Electric, was named “Song of the Day” on August 8, 2011.

== Song appearances on television ==
"City Boy" (from Celestial Electric)

- Criminal Minds (CBS; episode: "Painless"; air date: October 12, 2011)

"Somebody Like You" (from Celestial Electric)

- Castle (ABC; episode: "Clear & Present Danger"; air date: October 13, 2014)
- The Mindy Project (Fox)

"Automatic" (from La Musique Numérique)

- How I Rock It (Esquire Network)
