= James Hunter (singer) =

British R&B and soul singer

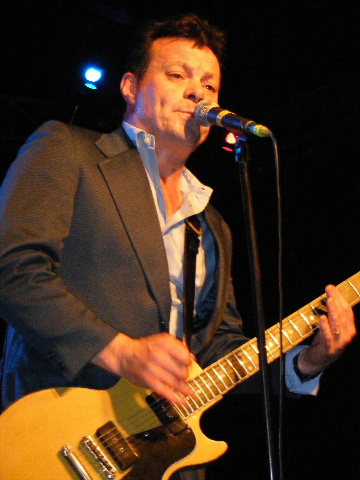

Background information
- Born: 2 October 1962 (age 63); Colchester, Essex, England
- Genres: Rhythm and blues; blue-eyed soul
- Occupations: Songwriter; musician
- Instruments: Guitar; vocals
- Years active: 1986–present
- Labels: GO Records; Hear; Big Beat; Ace; Rounder; Ruf; Daptone Records; highlevelmusic
- Website: www.jameshuntermusic.com

James Hunter (born 2 October 1962) is a British R&B musician and soul singer.

== Career ==
Hunter was born to a working-class family in Colchester, Essex. His early musical influences came from his grandmother's collection of 78rpm records of R'n'B and rock and roll music. Before turning 10, Hunter had begun playing the guitar and singing. His career began with a band called Howlin' Wilf and the Vee-Jays, who released their first album in 1986 entitled Cry Wilf. Later he released three more with his own band. He spent much of the 1990s playing small clubs in London, such as the Weavers Pub in Islington (North London), and the 100 Club on Oxford Street in London. Hunter's soulful style drew the attention of Van Morrison, who appeared on Hunter's first album released on Ace, Believe What I Say, in 1996. (Morrison sang backing vocals on "Turn On Your Love Light" and "Ain't Nothing You Can Do".) Hunter's relationship with Morrison led to a tour with the latter in the early 1990s; he sang backing vocals on Morrison's 1994 live album, A Night in San Francisco, and his 1995 studio recording Days Like This. Hunter's first solo release in the United States, his 2006 breakthrough album People Gonna Talk, was nominated for a Grammy Award for Best Traditional Blues Album at the 49th Grammy Awards ceremony. He parted ways with Rounder Records in 2008 and issued the album The Hard Way via Hear Music/Concord.

== Discography ==
=== Solo and as leader ===
Howlin' Wilf & The Veejays:

- Howlin Wilf & the Vee-Jays, Cry Wilf! (1986), re-issued by Big Beat (2002)
- Blue Men Sing The Whites (mini LP), Waterfront WF 036 (1987)
- Howlin' Wilf & The Vee-Jays, Unamerican Activities BRAVE 8 (1988/89)
- 6 By Six (six song mini album), Hound Dog BUT 004 (1990)

James Hunter:

- ...Believe What I Say (1996), Ace Records, appearances by Van Morrison and Doris Troy
- Kick it Around (1999) Ruf Records, produced by Boz Boorer
- People Gonna Talk (2006), Rounder Records
- The Hard Way (2008), Hear Music

The James Hunter Six:

- Minute By Minute (2013), Universal
- Hold On! (2016), Daptone Records
- Whatever It Takes (2018), Daptone Records
- Nick of Time (2020), Daptone Records
- With Love (2022), Daptone Records
- Off the Fence (2026), Easy Eye Sound

=== Album appearances ===
- A Night in San Francisco (1994) with Van Morrison
- Days Like This (1995) with Van Morrison
- Live at KEXP Volume 5 Track 13: Hunter's "Don't Do Me No Favours" (Various Artists) (2009)
