= List of Peel Sessions =

Many artists (bands and individual musicians) recorded at least one session for John Peel and his show on BBC Radio 1 between 1967 and his death in 2004. The first session was recorded by Tomorrow on 21 September 1967, and the last by Skimmer on 21 October 2004. After Skimmer's session, three further sessions that had already been booked before Peel's death were recorded: Bloc Party on 4 November, 65daysofstatic on 18 November and Sunn O))) on 9 December.

== Bands and artists with most sessions ==
	Band/artist	Number of sessions
1.	The Fall	24
2.	Ivor Cutler	22
3.	Loudon Wainwright III	16
4.	The Wedding Present	13
5.	Michael Chapman	12
6.	Fairport Convention	12
7.	Half Man Half Biscuit	12
8.	Incredible String Band	12
9.	Vivian Stanshall	12
10.	Billy Bragg	11
11.	Cinerama	11
12.	Thin Lizzy	11
13.	Caravan	10
14.	Kevin Coyne	10
15.	Roy Harper	10
16.	Hefner	10
17.	Medicine Head	10
18.	Bridget St John	10
19.	Steeleye Span	10
20.	Pete Atkin	9
21.	Martin Carthy	9
21.	Robin and Barry Dransfield	9
23.	Family	9
24.	Fleetwood Mac	9
25.	PJ Harvey	9

Where an artist has recorded more than one session under different names, then both names are listed.

== 0–9 ==
- 2TV: (1 session, 1979)
- 3 Inches of Blood: (1 session, 2003)
- 3D (A Fish in Sea): (3 sessions, 1982–83)
- 3Ds: (1 session, 1994)
- 4 Skins: (1 session, 1981)
- 7 Year Bitch: (1 session, 1993)
- 10 5 Neuton: (1 session, 1999)
- 13th Hole: (1 session, 1994)
- 14 Iced Bears: (2 sessions, 1986–87)
- 18th Dye: (2 sessions, 1994–99)
- 20th Century Steel Band: (1 session, 1975)
- 21 Guns: (1 session, 1981)
- 22-20s: (1 session, 2004)
- 23 Skidoo: (1 session, 1981)
- 25BZ: (1 session, 2003)
- 25 May: (1 session, 1991)
- 35 Summers: (2 sessions, 1990–91)
- 60 Ft. Dolls: (2 sessions, 1996–98)
- 65daysofstatic: (1 session, 2004)
- 70 Gwen Party: (4 sessions, 1991–94)
- 90 Day Men: (1 session, 2001)
- 400 Blows: (1 session, 1984)
- 999: (1 session, 1978)
- One Thousand Violins: (2 sessions, 1985–86)
- 1919: (2 sessions, 1982–83)
- 10,000 Maniacs: (1 session, 1985)

== A ==
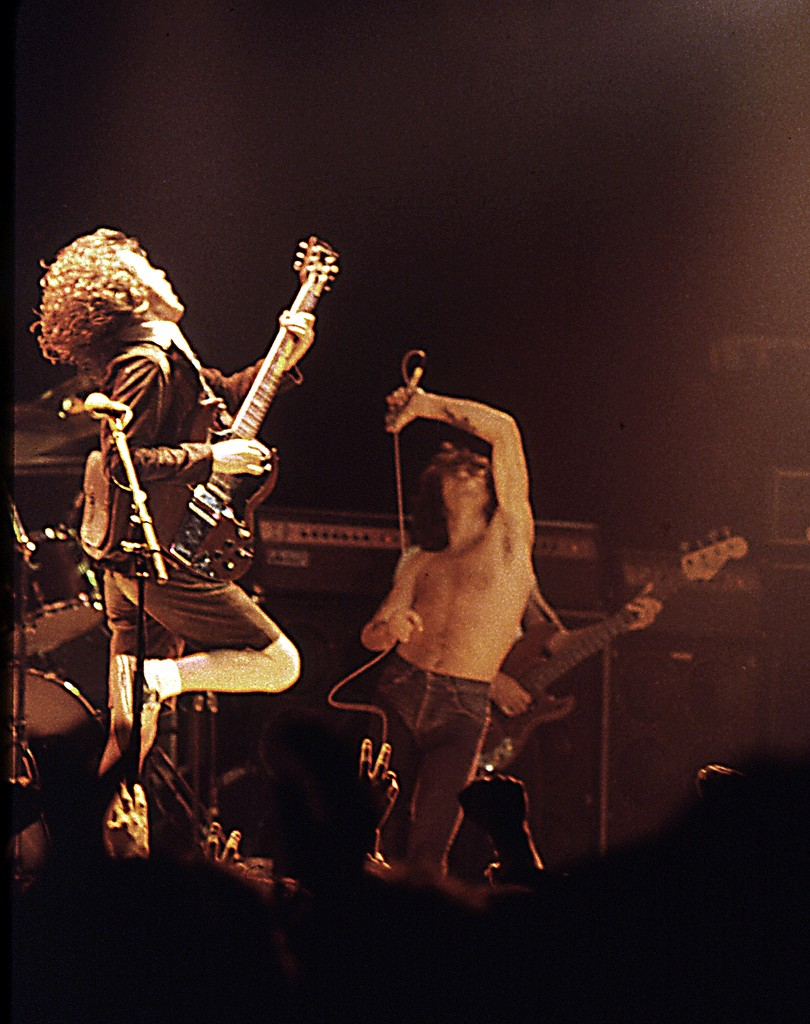
AC/DC recorded a Peel session in 1976.

- A.R.E. Weapons: (1 session, 2001)
- Aavikko: (1 session, 2001)
- Mick Abrahams Band: (2 sessions, 1971–72)
- The Abs: (2 sessions, 1987–88)
- AC Acoustics: (6 sessions, 1993–2002)
- AC/DC: (1 session, 1976)
- A.C. Temple: (1 session, 1987)
- Ace: (2 sessions, 1974–75)
- David Ackles: (1 session, 1968)
- Acqua Vista: (2 sessions, 2001–02)
- !Action Pact!: (2 sessions, 1982)
- Action Swingers: (1 session, 1992)
- Adam and the Ants: (3 sessions, 1978–79)
- Adamski: (1 session, 1990)
- Barry Adamson: (1 session, 1993)
- Add N to (X): (4 sessions, 1997–2002)
- The Adicts: (1 session, 1979)
- Adventures in Stereo: (1 session, 1997)
- The Adverts: (4 sessions, 1977–79)
- Aereogramme: (4 sessions, 2000–03)
- Aerial M: (1 session, 1998)
- The Afghan Whigs: (1 session, 1994)
- AFT: (1 session, 1976)
- Again Again: (1 session, 1978)
- Agathocles: (1 session, 1997)
- Age of Chance: (2 sessions, 1985–86)
- Agony Column: (1 session, 1979)
- A House: (2 sessions, 1987–92)
- Aina: (1 session, 2001)
- Aislers Set: (1 session, 2001)
- Bill Aitken: (1 session, 1975)
- Laurel Aitken: (1 session, 1980)
- Damon Albarn: (1 session, 2004)
- Alberto y Lost Trios Paranoias: (1 session, 1977)
- Albion Country Band: (5 sessions, 1972–78)
- Alec Empire: (1 session, 1995)
- Alfie: (2 sessions, 2000–01)
- Alien Sex Fiend: (2 sessions, 1984)
- Ahmad Al-Khalil & Hamid Mohammed: (1 session, 1969)
- Allez Allez: (1 session, 1981)
- Alliance Underground: (1 session, 2002)
- Marc Almond: (1 session, 1983)
- Altered Images: (3 sessions, 1980–81)
- Altern-8: (1 session, 1991)
- Alternative TV: (1 session, 1977)
- AM60: (2 sessions, 2002)
- Amayenge: (2 sessions, 1988)
- Amazing Band: (1 session, 1970)
- Amazulu: (2 sessions, 1982–83)
- Amen Corner: (2 sessions, 1967–68)
- American TV Cops: (1 session, 1995)
- Amon Düül: (1 session, 1973)
- Amorous Toads: (1 session, 1982)
- Anaal Nathrakh: (1 session, 2003)
- And Also the Trees: (1 session, 1984)
- …And You Will Know Us by the Trail of Dead: (2 sessions, 2000–02)
- Peter Anders and Vini Poncia: (1 session, 1968)
- Ian Anderson: (1 session, 1968)
- Miller Anderson: (2 sessions, 1971–72)
- Harvey Andrews: (1 session, 1972)
- Harvey Andrews and Graham Cooper: (1 session, 1973)
- Andromeda: (1 session, 1968)
- Dave Angel: (4 sessions, 1996–99)
- Angelic Upstarts: (3 sessions, 1978–91)
- Aggelica: (1 session, 1999)
- Angels One Five: (1 session, 1981)
- Anhrefn: (3 sessions, 1986–93)
- Animal Magic: (2 sessions, 1982)
- Another Pretty Face: (1 session, 1981)
- Ant (Antony Harding): (1 session, 2000)
- AntiHero: (2 sessions, 2000–03)
- Any Trouble: (1 session, 1980)
- APB: (2 sessions, 1981–82)
- Aphex Twin: (2 sessions, 1992–95)
- Aphrodisiacs: (2 sessions, 2002–04)
- Apollinaires: (1 session, 1982)
- Apparat: (1 session, 2004)
- Appendix Out: (1 session, 2001)
- Appliance: (4 sessions, 1998–2002)
- Arab Strap: (3 sessions, 1997–2000)
- Arc: (1 session, 1971)
- Archers of Loaf: (2 sessions, 1994)
- Argent: (1 session, 1972)
- Ariel: (1 session, 1974)
- Joan Armatrading: (8 sessions, 1972–76)
- John Armstrong: (1 session, 1999)
- Billy Boy Arnold: (1 session, 1977)
- P. P. Arnold: (1 session, 1968)
- Arson Garden: (1 session, 1990)
- Art Phag: (1 session, 1988)
- Artery: (2 sessions, 1981–82)
- Ascii Disko: (1 session, 2003)
- Ash: (4 sessions, 1994–2001)
- Ashman Reynolds: (1 session, 1972)
- Aspects: (1 session, 2001)
- Associates: (2 sessions, 1981–82)
- Astrid: (1 session, 2001)
- Astronaut: (1 session, 1998)
- Aswad: (2 sessions, 1976–78)
- Pete Atkin: (9 sessions, 1972–75)
- Juan Atkins: (1 session, 1998)
- Atlantis: (1 session, 1973)
- Natacha Atlas: (1 session, 1995)
- Attic: (1 session, 1980)
- Attila the Stockbroker: (2 sessions, 1982–83)
- Attwenger: (1 session, 1992)
- Au Pairs: (4 sessions, 1979–82)
- Aubrey Small: (1 session, 1971)
- Audience: (1 session, 1972)
- Brian Auger's Oblivion Express: (1 session, 1972)
- Brian Auger's Trinity: (3 sessions, 1967–68)
- Autechre: (3 sessions, 1995–2003)
- The Auteurs: (1 session, 1996)
- Autopop: (1 session, 1996)
- Autumn 1904: (1 session, 1984)
- Avrorcar: (1 session, 2004)
- Kevin Ayers: (5 sessions, 1970–76)

== B ==
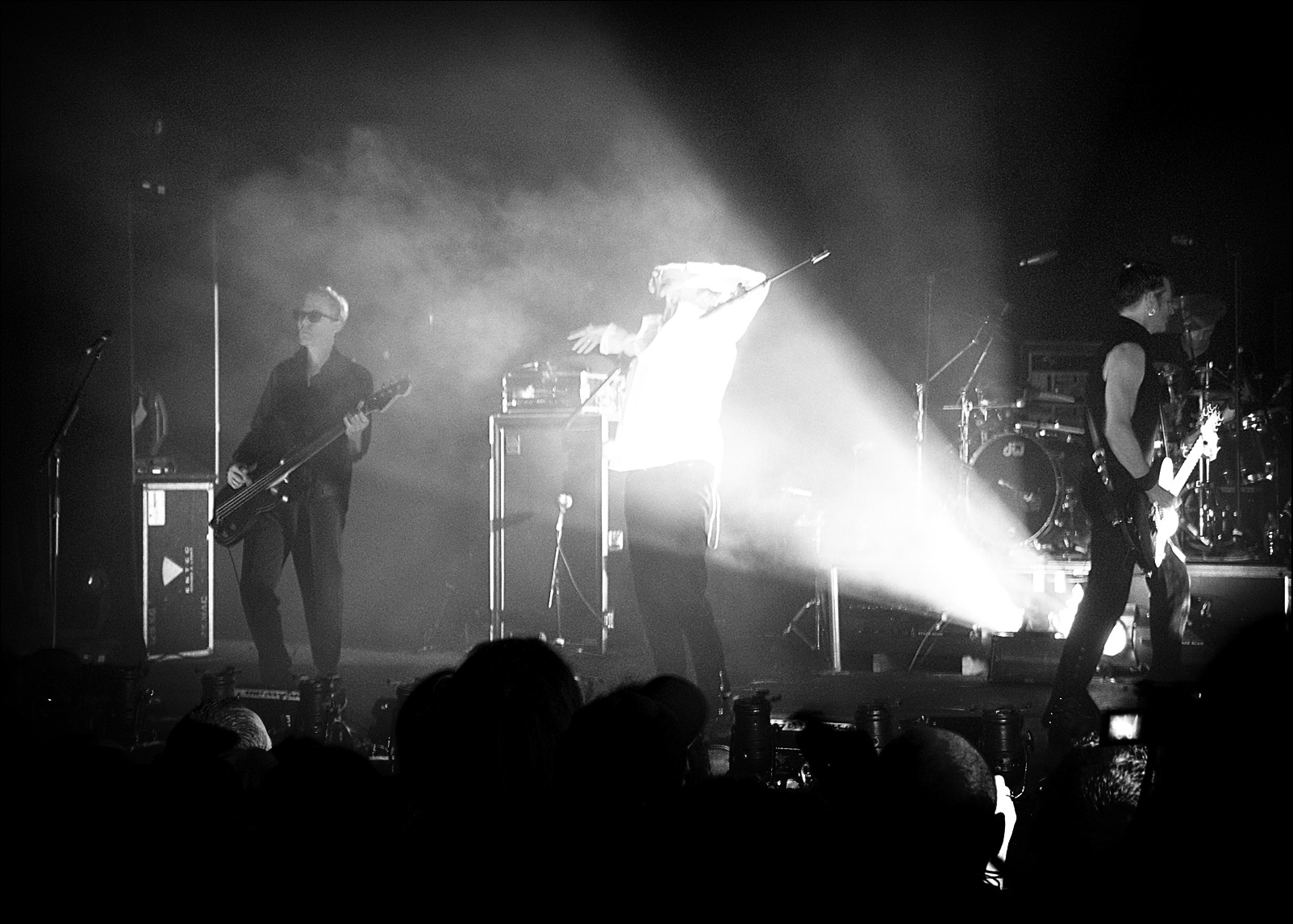
Bauhaus recorded two sessions in 1979 and 1982.

- B-Movie: (1 session, 1981)
- Babe Ruth: (2 sessions, 1972–73)
- Babes in Toyland: (5 sessions, 1990–95)
- Back Door: (5 sessions, 1972–74)
- Backwater: (1 session, 1996)
- Bad Dress Sense: (1 session, 1987)
- Bad Religion: (1 session, 1993)
- Badgewearer: (1 session, 1995)
- Bailter Space: (1 session, 1992)
- Baker-Gurvitz Army: (1 session, 1975)
- The Bakerloo Blues Line: (2 sessions, 1968–69)
- Balcony: (1 session, 1981)
- Long John Baldry: (2 sessions, 1972)
- Ballboy: (6 sessions, 2000–04)
- Bambi Slam: (1 session, 1987)
- Bamboo Zoo: (1 session, 1981)
- Banco de Gaia: (1 session, 1994)
- Band of Susans: (2 sessions, 1988–89)
- Bandoggs: (1 session, 1977)
- Bandulu: (3 sessions, 1992–96)
- Bandung File: (1 session, 1988)
- Bang Bang Machine: (1 session, 1992)
- Bangtwister: (1 session, 1997)
- Baptist Generals: (1 session, 2002)
- Barbel: (2 sessions, 1990–91)
- Barcelona Pavilion: (1 session, 2003)
- Barclay James Harvest: (5 sessions, 1968–74)
- Bardo Pond: (2 sessions, 2001–04)
- Bardots: (1 session, 1992)
- Barkmarket: (2 sessions, 1990–94)
- Syd Barrett: (1 session, 1970)
- Basement Five: (1 session, 1980)
- Basking Sharks: (1 session, 1983)
- Bastard Kestrel: (2 sessions, 1988)
- Bastro: (2 sessions, 1990)
- Battered Ornaments: (2 sessions, 1969)
- Bauhaus: (2 sessions, 1980–82)
- Bays: (2 sessions, 2002–04)
- The Bear Quartet: (1 session, 1993)
- Bearsuit: (3 sessions, 2001–02)
- The Beat: (3 sessions, 1979–82)
- Beatnigs: (1 session, 1988)
- Beatnik Filmstars: (5 sessions, 1995–98)
- Be-Bop Deluxe: (6 sessions, 1973–78)
- The Jeff Beck Group: (3 sessions, 1967–72)
- Beckett: (1 session, 1974)
- Bee Gees: (2 sessions, 1967–68)
- Bee Vamp: (1 session, 1981)
- Captain Beefheart and his Magic Band: (2 sessions, 1968)
- Bees Make Honey: (2 sessions, 1973)
- The Bees: (1 session, 2001)
- Si Begg: (3 sessions, 1998–2003)
- Belle and Sebastian: (5 sessions, 2001–04)
- The Bellrays: (1 session, 2002)
- Beloved: (2 sessions, 1985)
- Bennet: (3 sessions, 1996–97)
- Tony 'Duster' Bennett: (7 sessions, 1968–73)
- Benny Profane: (3 sessions, 1988–90)
- Justin Berkovi: (1 session, 1997)
- Andrew Berry: (1 session, 1986)
- Bette Davis & The Balconettes: (1 session, 1997)
- Beulah: (1 session, 1999)
- Bhundu Boys: (2 sessions, 1986–87)
- Biffy Clyro: (1 session, 2004)
- Big Black: (1 session, 1987)
- Big Chief: (1 session, 1991)
- Big Country: (1 session, 1983)
- Big Fayia: (1 session, 1989)
- Big Flame: (4 sessions, 1984–86)
- Big in Japan: (1 session, 1979)
- Big Self: (1 session, 1982)
- Bikini Kill: (1 session, 1993)
- Bilge Pump: (2 sessions, 2003)
- Billy Mahonie: (2 sessions, 1999–2002)
- Birdhouse: (1 session, 1987)
- Birdland (6 June 1989, 2 January 1990)
- The Birthday Party: (4 sessions, 1980–82)
- Bis: (5 sessions, 1995–2000)
- Bivouac: (3 sessions, 1992–94)
- Bizarre Inc: (1 session, 1991)
- Black: (2 sessions, 1983)
- Black Cat Bones: (1 session, 1969)
- The Black Dog: (2 sessions, 1995–97)
- Black Keys: (2 sessions, 2003)
- Black Roots: (2 sessions, 1981–83)
- Black Sabbath: (1 session, 1969)
- Black Star Liner: (3 sessions, 1995–99)
- Frank Black: (3 sessions, 1994–99)
- The Black Heart Procession: (1 session, 1999)
- Blade: (1 session, 1990)
- Blancmange: (1 session, 1982)
- Blank Students: (1 session, 1981)
- Blast Furnace and the Heatwaves: (1 session, 1978)
- Bleach: (2 sessions, 1990–91)
- Blithe: (1 session, 1993)
- Blizzard Boys: (1 session, 2003)
- Bloc Party: (1 session, 2004)
- Blodwyn Pig: (2 sessions, 1969–74)
- Blonde Redhead: (1 session, 2000)
- Blood and Roses: (1 session, 1983)
- The Bloody Hollies: (1 session, 2004)
- Blossom Toes: (4 sessions, 1967–69)
- Blubber: (1 session, 1994)
- Blue: (7 sessions, 1973–77)
- Blue Orchids: (2 sessions, 1980–82)
- Blue Poland: (1 session, 1982)
- Blueboy: (1 session, 1994)
- Blueskins: (2 sessions, 2003–04)
- Bluetip: (1 session, 1999)
- The Bluetones: (2 sessions, 1995–96)
- Colin Blunstone: (3 sessions, 1972–73)
- Blur: (2 sessions, 1997–99)
- Blurt: (1 session, 1980)
- Boards of Canada: (1 session, 1998)
- BOB: (3 sessions, 1988–89)
- Bob Tilton (band): (1 session, 1995)
- Bodies: (1 session, 1980)
- The Bodines: (1 session, 1987)
- Bodysnatchers: (2 sessions, 1980)
- Eric Bogosian: (1 session, 1983)
- Bogshed: (5 sessions, 1985–87)
- Bolt Thrower: (3 sessions, 1988–90)
- Bomb Disneyland: (1 session, 1989)
- Graham Bond Initiation: (1 session, 1970)
- Bone: (1 session, 1990)
- Bone Orchard: (1 session, 1983)
- Bong-Ra: (1 session, 2002)
- Bongos and the Groovies: (1 session, 1973)
- Bongwater: (1 session, 1991)
- Bonnie 'Prince' Billy: (3 sessions, 1999–2001)
- Bonzo Dog Band: (7 sessions, 1967–69)
- Boo Radleys: (3 sessions, 1990–91)
- Boom Bip: (2 sessions, 2002–03)
- Boomtown Rats: (2 sessions, 1977–78)
- Boothill Foot Tappers: (2 sessions, 1984–85)
- Boots for Dancing: (3 sessions, 1980–82)
- Boss Hog: (1 session, 1991)
- Bothy Band: (3 sessions, 1976–78)
- Bourbonese Qualk: (1 session, 1987)
- Bourgie Bourgie: (1 session, 1984)
- Bow Wow Wow: (1 session, 1980)
- Bowery Electric: (1 session, 1997)
- David Bowie: (4 sessions, 1967–72)
- Bowles Brothers: (2 sessions, 1976–77)
- Alan Bown: (2 sessions, 1967–68)
- Box of Toys: (1 session, 1983)
- Box: (1 session, 1983)
- Boxer: (1 session, 1975)
- Gary Boyle: (1 session, 1977)
- Boyracer: (1 session, 1994)
- The Boys: (2 sessions, 1977–78)
- Boys of the Lough: (7 sessions, 1972–78)
- Bracket: (1 session, 1995)
- Paul Brady: (1 session, 1978)
- Billy Bragg: (11 sessions, 1983–2000)
- Brainiac: (1 session, 1995)
- Brand X: (2 sessions, 1976)
- Brassy: (2 sessions, 1996–2000)
- Bratmobile: (1 session, 1993)
- Brave Captain: (1 session, 2000)
- Breed: (4 sessions, 1991–94)
- Breeders: (1 session, 1990)
- The Brian Jonestown Massacre: (1 session, 1998)
- Brides Make Acid: (1 session, 1993)
- The Bridewell Taxis: (1 session, 1990)
- Marc Brierley: (1 session, 1968)
- Brigandage: (1 session, 1983)
- Anne Briggs: (2 sessions, 1969–72)
- Brilliant: (1 session, 1982)
- The Brilliant Corners: (3 sessions, 1984–87)
- Derek Brimstone: (1 session, 1969)
- Brinsley Schwarz: (4 sessions, 1970–75)
- British Lions: (1 session, 1978)
- Broadcast: (3 sessions, 1996–2003)
- Broccoli: (2 sessions, 1995–98)
- Dave Brock and Friends: (1 session, 1969)
- Broken Dog: (5 sessions, 1997–2000)
- The Broken Family Band (2 sessions, 2003–04)
- Bronco: (2 sessions, 1971–73)
- Bronski Beat: (1 session, 1984)
- Bronx Cheer: (1 session, 1972)
- Elkie Brooks: (1 session, 1976)
- Brotherhood of Breath: (2 sessions, 1971–72)
- Edgar Broughton Band: (8 sessions, 1969–73)
- Pete Brown & Piblokto: (1 session, 1970)
- Arthur Brown: (2 sessions, 1967–68)
- Arthur Brown's Kingdom Come: (4 sessions, 1971–72)
- Arthur Brown Band: (1 session, 1975)
- Scott Brown: (1 session, 1996)
- Tim Buckley: (2 sessions, 1968)
- Budgie: (2 sessions, 1972–76)
- Buffalo Tom: (1 session, 1990)
- The Bug vs Soundmurderer: (1 session, 2003)
- Buick 6: (1 session, 2002)
- Building 44: (1 session, 1983)
- Eric Burdon & The Animals: (2 sessions, 1967–68)
- The Butterflies of Love: (1 session, 1999)
- Butterfly Child: (2 sessions, 1992–93)
- Butthole Surfers: (2 sessions, 1987–88)
- Buttsteak: (1 session, 1992)
- Buy Off the Bar: (4 sessions, 1986–89)
- Buzzcocks: (4 sessions, 1977–79)
- Byzantium: (1 session, 1974)

== C ==
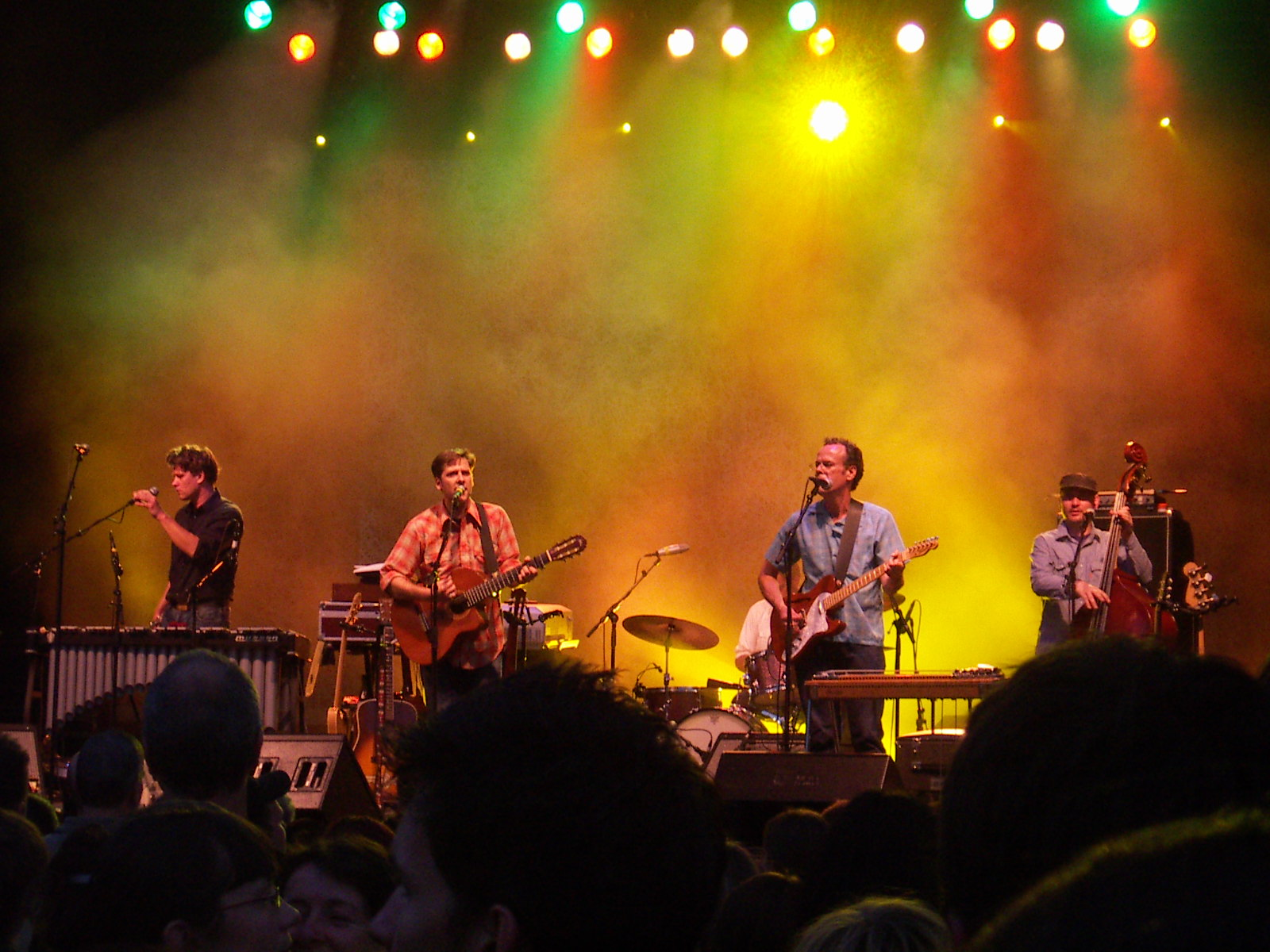
Calexico recorded five sessions between 1997 and 2003.

- Cabaret Voltaire: (2 sessions, 1981–84)
- Cable: (4 sessions, 1994–98)
- Cado Belle: (1 session, 1976)
- Cajun Moon: (2 sessions, 1975–76)
- John Cale: (1 session, 1975)
- Calexico: (4 sessions, 1997–2003)
- Calvin Party: (4 sessions 1994–2004)
- Camel: (1 session, 1973)
- Camera Obscura: (5 sessions, 2001–04)
- Can: (4 sessions, 1973–75)
- Cane 141: (1 session, 2001)
- Laura Cantrell: (5 sessions, 2001–03)
- Capital Letters: (1 session, 1979)
- Capitols: (1 session, 1987)
- Tony Capstick: (4 sessions, 1972–74)
- Cane 141: (1 session, 2001)
- Caravan: (10 sessions, 1968–77)
- Carcass: (2 sessions, 1988–90)
- Carnastoan: (2 sessions, 1981–82)
- Carol Concert: (1 session, 1970)
- The Carpettes: (2 sessions, 1978)
- Martin Carthy: (9 sessions, 1972–83)
- Neko Case: (1 session, 2000)
- Cat Power: (3 sessions, 2000–03)
- Catapult: (1 session, 1987)
- Catherine Wheel: (1 session, 1991)
- The Catheters: (1 session, 2002)
- Cats Against the Bomb: (1 session, 2000)
- Nick Cave and the Bad Seeds: (1 session, 1984)
- Cay: (2 sessions, 1998–2000)
- Cee Bee Beaumont: (1 session, 1994)
- Cell: (1 session, 1992)
- Centromatic: (1 session, 2001)
- Centry: (1 session, 1994)
- A Certain Ratio: (3 sessions, 1979–82)
- Cha Cha Cohen: (2 sessions, 1996–99)
- Chakk: (1 session, 1984)
- The Chameleons: (3 sessions, 1981–84)
- Champion Doug Veitch: (2 sessions, 1984–86)
- Michael Chapman: (12 sessions, 1968–78)
- Chapman-Whitney Streetwalkers: (4 sessions, 1974–77)
- Chapter 13: (1 session, 2001)
- Chapterhouse: (1 session, 1990)
- Charlatans: (2 sessions, 1990–91)
- Craig Charles: (2 sessions, 1983–84)
- Charlie: (1 session, 1976)
- Charlottefield: (1 session, 2003)
- Charlottes: (1 session, 1989)
- The Chefs: (1 session, 1981)
- Chelsea: (2 sessions, 1977–78)
- Cherry Boys: (2 sessions, 1982)
- Cherry Forever: (1 session, 1991)
- Cherryblades: (1 session, 1991)
- Chevalier Brothers: (2 sessions, 1983)
- Cheviot Ranters: (2 sessions, 1972–74)
- John Chibadura & the Tembo Brothers: (1 session, 1989)
- Chicken Shack: (4 sessions, 1968–69)
- Chicks on Speed: (1 session, 2000)
- Chieftains: (5 sessions, 1970–75)
- Children of the Bong: (1 session, 1994)
- Chilli Willi and the Red Hot Peppers: (3 sessions, 1973–74)
- Chills: (3 sessions, 1985–88)
- China Crisis: (2 sessions, 1982–83)
- Chinese Gangster Element: (1 session, 1984)
- Ted Chippington: (1 session, 1985)
- Stella Chiweshe: (2 sessions, 1988–91)
- The Chords: (2 sessions, 1979–80)
- Christ: (1 session, 2003)
- Christians in Search of Filth: (1 session, 1982)
- Chrome Cranks: (1 session, 1995)
- Chuck: (1 session, 1996)
- Chukki Starr & The Ruff Cutt Band: (1 session, 2002)
- Chumbawamba: (2 sessions, 1992–93)
- Cigarettes: (1 session, 1980)
- Cimarrons: (2 sessions, 1975–78)
- Cinerama: (11 sessions, 1998–2003)
- Circle: (1 session, 2002)
- Circus: (1 session, 1968)
- City Limits Crew & The Mutant Rockers: (1 session, 1985)
- Claire: (1 session, 1987)
- Chris Clark & The Johnny Watson Concept: (1 session, 1967)
- Dave Clarke: (6 sessions, 1994–2004)
- Clearlake: (1 session, 2000)
- Climax Chicago Blues Band: (3 sessions, 1974–76)
- Climax: (5 sessions, 1997–2002)
- Clock DVA: (1 session, 1983)
- Close Lobsters: (1 session, 1987)
- Clotaire K: (1 session, 2003)
- cLOUDDEAD: (2 sessions, 2001–02)
- Clouds: (1 session, 1991)
- CNN: (1 session, 1993)
- Coalition: (1 session, 2002)
- Cobra: (1 session, 1991)
- Cochise: (3 sessions, 1970–71)
- Joe Cocker and The Grease Band: (3 sessions, 1968–69)
- Cockney Rebel: (1 session, 1974)
- Cockney Rejects: (2 sessions, 1979–80)
- Cocteau Twins: (4 sessions, 1982–84)
- Codeine: (2 sessions, 1992–94)
- Leonard Cohen: (1 session, 1968)
- Coin Op: (1 session, 2002)
- Coldcut: (3 sessions, 1997–2004)
- Shirley Collins: (1 session, 1969)
- Shirley & Dolly Collins: (2 sessions, 1968–73)
- Colon: (1 session, 1990)
- Colorblind James Experience: (2 sessions, 1988–89)
- John Hiseman's Colosseum: (3 sessions, 1969)
- Colosseum II: (1 session, 1977)
- Colours Out of Time: (1 session, 1981)
- Comatose: (1 session, 1998)
- Come: (2 sessions, 1992–93)
- Come in Tokio: (3 sessions, 1982–84)
- Come Ons: (1 session, 2002)
- Comet Gain: (2 sessions, 1996–97)
- Company 2: (1 session, 1989)
- The Comsat Angels: (4 sessions, 1979–81)
- Conemelt: (1 session, 1998)
- Conscious Sounds Collective: (1 session, 1996)
- Consolidated: (1 session, 1991)
- Cook Da Books: (2 sessions, 1983–84)
- Cookie Crew: (2 sessions, 1985)
- John Cooper Clarke: (2 sessions, 1978–82)
- Mike Cooper: (8 sessions, 1968–75)
- Cop Shoot Cop: (2 sessions, 1991–92)
- Julian Cope (3 sessions, 1983–91)
- Phil Cordell (1 session, 1969)
- Cords: (2 sessions, 1992–93)
- Cornelius: (2 sessions, 1997–99)
- Cornershop: (2 sessions, 1993–2002)
- Corporation: (1 session, 1982)
- Cortinas: (1 session, 1977)
- Elvis Costello & The Attractions: (4 sessions, 1977–80)
- Count Bishops: (2 sessions, 1976–77)
- Country Gazette: (2 sessions, 1973–75)
- Wayne County & the Electric Chairs: (1 session, 1979)
- Cove: (1 session, 2002)
- Cows: (1 session, 1990)
- Carl Cox: (2 sessions, 1997–99)
- Lol Coxhill: (2 sessions, 1972–73)
- Graham Coxon: (2 sessions, 2004)
- Coyne Clague: (1 session, 1969)
- Kevin Coyne: (10 sessions, 1973–90)
- Crabs: (1 session, 1978)
- Crabs: (1 session, 1982)
- The Cramps: (1 session, 1986)
- Cranberries: (1 session, 1992)
- Crane: (2 sessions, 1990–93)
- Cranebuilders: (2 sessions, 2002–03)
- Cranes: (2 sessions, 1989–90)
- Crass: (1 session, 1979)
- The Cravats: (4 sessions, 1979–82)
- Cream: (2 sessions, 1967–68)
- Credit To The Nation: (1 session, 1994)
- The Crimea: (1 session, 2003)
- Crisis: (1 session, 1978)
- Crispy Ambulance: (1 session, 1981)
- Crocodile God: (2 sessions, 1997–98)
- Cross Section: (1 session, 1982)
- Crowbar: (1 session, 1972)
- Crowsdell: (1 session, 1995)
- Arthur Crudup: (1 session, 1970)
- Cuban Boys: (2 sessions, 1998–2000)
- Cuban Heels: (2 sessions, 1981)
- Cud: (3 sessions, 1987–89)
- Culture: (3 sessions, 1982–2002)
- The Cure: (6 sessions, 1978–85)
- Curly: (1 session, 1973)
- Curve: (3 sessions, 1991–93)
- Curved Air: (1 session, 1970)
- Ivor Cutler: (22 sessions, 1969–98)
- Cymande: (2 sessions, 1973–74)

== D ==
- Asher D and Daddy Freddy: (1 session, 1988)
- D&V: (1 session, 1986)
- The D4: (1 session, 2002)
- Daddy Longlegs: (1 session, 1970)
- Dalai Lama: (1 session, 1972)
- Dick Dale: (5 sessions, 1995–2004)
- Corvin Dalek: (1 session, 2002)
- The Damned: (6 sessions, 1976–84)
- Dan: (1 session, 1998)
- Dance Fault: (1 session, 1982)
- Dandelion Adventure: (1 session, 1990)
- Dando Shaft: (2 sessions, 1971–72)
- The Danse Society: (2 sessions, 1981–82)
- Danta: (3 sessions, 1971–72)
- Terence Trent D'Arby: (1 session, 1987)
- Darkness & Jive: (2 sessions, 1982–83)
- The Darling Buds: (3 sessions, 1987–89)
- Datblygu: (5 sessions, 1987–93)
- The Datsuns: (1 session, 2002)
- DaVincis: (2 sessions, 1987–88)
- The Spencer Davis Group: (1 session, 1967)
- Dawn Chorus and the Blue Tits: (1 session, 1985)
- Dawn of the Replicants: (4 sessions, 1997–2002)
- The Dawn Parade: (2 sessions, 2002–03)
- Dawson: (2 sessions, 1990–91)
- Ronnie Dawson: (2 sessions, 1993–94)
- DCL Locomotive: (1 session, 1986)
- De Dannan: (1 session, 1978)
- Dead Can Dance: (2 sessions, 1983–84)
- Dead Famous People: (1 session, 1989)
- Dead Meadow: (1 session, 2001)
- Dead on Arrival: (1 session, 1981)
- Dead or Alive: (2 sessions, 1981–82)
- Deaf School: (3 sessions, 1976–78)
- Death by Milkfloat: (2 sessions, 1987–88)
- Decoration: (1 session, 2004)
- Deep Purple: (2 sessions, 1968–69)
- Deep Turtle: (1 session, 1994)
- Deerhoof: (1 session, 2004)
- Sam Dees' Beauty & the Beat (1 session, 1991)
- Definition of Sound: (1 session, 1990)
- Degrassi: (2 sessions, 2001–02)
- Del Amitri: (2 sessions, 1984–85)
- The Delgados: (8 sessions, 1995–2004)
- Delicatessen: (1 session, 1995)
- Delivery: (1 session, 1971)
- Delta 5: (2 sessions, 1980)
- Deltones: (1 session, 1986)
- Deluxx Unconvinced: (1 session, 1995)
- Demolition Doll Rods: (1 session, 1997)
- Department S: (1 session, 1980)
- Depth Charge: (1 session, 1991)
- Derrero: (3 sessions, 1999–2001)
- The Desperate Bicycles: (1 session, 1978)
- Det Ri Mental: (2 sessions, 1994–95)
- The Detroit Cobras: (2 sessions, 2003–04)
- Deutsch Amerikanische Freundschaft: (1 session, 1979)
- Deviated Instinct: (1 session, 1990)
- Howard Devoto: (1 session, 1983)
- Dexy's Midnight Runners: (1 session, 1980)
- The Diagram Brothers: (3 sessions, 1980–82)
- Diatribe: (1 session, 1985)
- Diblo Dibala: (2 sessions 1992–95)
- Sean Dickson: (2 sessions, 1998–2001)
- Die Kruz: (1 session, 1996)
- Dinosaur Jr.: (3 sessions, 1988–92)
- The Dirtbombs: (1 session, 2001)
- Dislocation Dance: (2 sessions, 1981–82)
- The Disposable Heroes of Hiphoprisy: (1 session, 1992)
- Distorted Waves of Ohm: (1 session, 1995)
- Distributors: (2 sessions, 1979–81)
- DJ Bailey with MC Sap: (1 session, 2004)
- DJ Bone: (1 session, 2001)
- DJ Eastwood & Friends: (1 session, 2004)
- DJ Food: (1 session, 2000)
- DJ Fresh: (1 session, 2004)
- DJ Hell: (1 session, 1995)
- DJ J Da Flex & Crazy D: (1 session, 2004)
- DJ Robbo Ranx & Lady Saw: (1 session, 2004)
- DJ /rupture: (2 sessions, 2002–04)
- DJ Twitch: (1 session, 2003)
- DJs Kemistry & Storm: (1 session, 1999)
- DM Bob & Jem Finer 2 Man Band: (1 session, 2004)
- DM Bob & The Deficits: (1 session, 1997)
- DMC World DJ Finalists: (3 sessions, 2000–03)
- Do Make Say Think: (1 session, 2000)
- D.O.A.: (1 session, 1984)
- Doctor and the Crippens: (2 sessions, 1988–89)
- Doctor Calculus: (1 session, 1985)
- Doctors of Madness: (1 session, 1976)
- Jegsy Dodd: (1 session, 1985)
- Dodgems: (1 session, 1979)
- Dodgers: (1 session, 1976)
- Dog Faced Hermans: (1 session, 1987)
- Dolly Mixture: (1 session, 1979)
- Done Lying Down: (4 sessions, 1993–97)
- Donkey: (1 session, 1995)
- Donovan: (2 sessions, 1968)
- Doo Rag: (2 sessions, 1994–96)
- Doom: (2 sessions, 1988–89)
- John Doonan: (1 session, 1974)
- Dormannu: (1 session, 1984)
- Double: (1 session, 2004)
- Downliners Sect: (1 session, 1977)
- Dr Devious: (1 session, 1992)
- Dr. Feelgood: (3 sessions, 1975–78)
- Dr. Phibes and the House of Wax Equations: (2 sessions, 1991–93)
- Dr. Strangely Strange: (1 session, 1970)
- Nick Drake: (1 session, 1969)
- Robin and Barry Dransfield: (9 sessions, 1971–78)
- Dreadzone: (4 sessions, 1993–2004)
- Dream City Film Club: (2 sessions, 1996–99)
- Dressy Bessy: (1 session, 2002)
- Drive: (1 session, 1990)
- Drome: (1 session, 1994)
- The Drones: (1 session, 1977)
- Drop Nineteens: (1 session, 1992)
- Drowning Craze: (1 session, 1982)
- Drum Club: (1 session, 1994)
- Drunk Tank: (1 session, 1992)
- Dub Sex: (4 sessions, 1987–89)
- Ducks Deluxe: (3 sessions, 1973–75)
- Dumb: (1 session, 1996)
- John Dummer Blues Band: (2 sessions, 1968–69)
- John Dummer Oobleedooblee Band: (4 sessions, 1972–73)
- Aynsley Dunbar Retaliation: (1 session, 1968)
- Lesley Duncan: (1 session, 1969)
- Champion Jack Dupree: (1 session, 1968)
- Ian Dury and The Blockheads: (1 session, 1977)
- Dustball: (4 sessions, 1998–2002)
- Dweeb: (1 session, 1996)
- Dynamic Three: (2 sessions, 1987–88)

== E ==
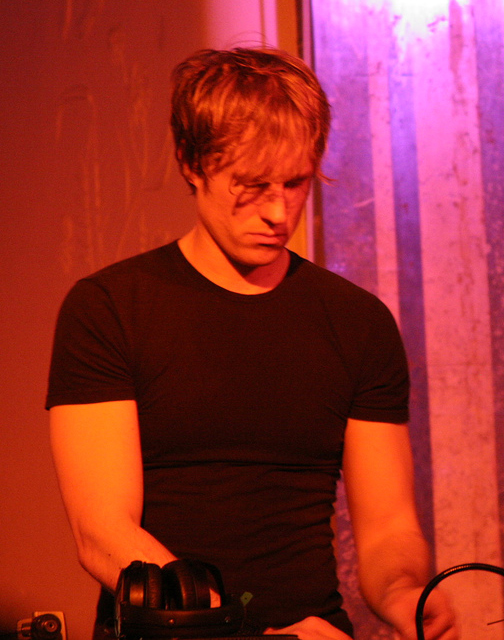
Alec Empire recorded a session in 1995.

- Earth The Californian Love Dream: (1 session, 2003)
- East of Eden: (2 sessions, 1970)
- Eat Static: (2 sessions, 1993–97)
- EC80R: (1 session, 1999)
- Echo & the Bunnymen: (7 sessions, 1979–97)
- Echobelly: (1 session, 1995)
- Echoboy: (3 sessions, 1999–2003)
- Eclection: (4 sessions, 1968–69)
- Econoline: (1 session, 2002)
- The Ecstasy of Saint Teresa: (1 session, 1993)
- Ed Hall: (1 session, 1994)
- Eddie and the Hot Rods: (3 sessions, 1977–79)
- Duane Eddy: (1 session, 1974)
- The Edge: (1 session, 1979)
- Dave Edmunds' Rockpile: (1 session, 1977)
- Edsel Auctioneer: (2 sessions, 1989–93)
- Terry Edwards: (4 sessions, 1991–99)
- Eek-A-Mouse: (2 sessions, 1983–84)
- Egg: (2 sessions, 1969–72)
- Eggs: (1 session, 1994)
- Einstürzende Neubauten: (1 session, 1983)
- Eire Apparent: (1 session, 1969)
- Mark Etzel & Peter Buck: (1 session, 1997)
- El Dorados: (1 session, 1995)
- El Goodo: (1 session, 2001)
- El Hombre Trajeado: (3 sessions, 1998–2001)
- Elastica: (4 sessions, 1993–99)
- Electrelane: (2 sessions, 2003–04)
- Electribe 101: (1 session, 1989)
- Electric Music AKA: (1 session, 2000)
- Electric Sound of Joy: (1 session, 1997)
- Electro Hippies: (1 session, 1987)
- Element: (2 sessions, 2000)
- Elements of Noize: (1 session, 1998)
- Elevate: (2 sessions, 1994–95)
- Eleven: (1 session, 1984)
- Steve Elgin and the Flatbackers: (1 session, 1979)
- Elizabethan Jazz Trio: (1 session, 1969)
- Ella Guru: (1 session, 2004)
- Ellery Bop: (3 sessions, 1981–84)
- Matthew Ellis: (2 sessions, 1972)
- End: (2 sessions, 1968)
- Endgames: (2 sessions, 1981–82)
- Eno (& the Winkies): (1 session, 1974)
- Eon: (2 sessions, 1991–2002)
- Erase Errata: (2 sessions, 2003–2004)
- Erazerhead: (1 session, 1982)
- Eric's Trip: (1 session, 1993)
- Eska: (1 session, 1997)
- Essential Logic: (1 session, 1979)
- Etchingham Steam Band: (1 session, 1974)
- Eton Crop: (5 sessions, 1983–88)
- Eva Luna: (1 session, 1993)
- Even As We Speak: (3 sessions, 1992–93)
- Everyone: (1 session, 1970)
- Everything but the Girl: (2 sessions, 1984–85)
- The Ex: (3 sessions, 1983–86)
- eX-Girl: (1 session, 2000)
- Ex-Post Facto: (1 session, 1984)
- Exiles: (2 sessions, 2003)
- Exit Condition: (1 session, 1991)
- Expelaires: (1 session, 1979)
- The Expelled: (1 session, 1982)
- The Experimental Pop Band: (1 session, 1997)
- Explosions in the Sky: (2 sessions, 2002–04)
- Extreme Noise Terror: (4 sessions, 1987–2001)
- E-Z Rollers: (1 session, 2004)
- EZ T: (1 session, 2004)

== F ==
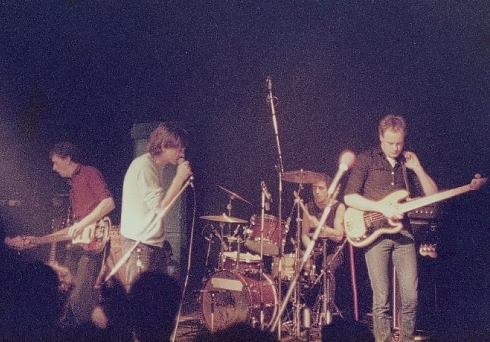
Peel's favourite group, The Fall, recorded 24 sessions, spanning from 1978 to 2004.

- Fabio: (1 session, 2001)
- Fabric: (1 session, 1993)
- Fabulous Poodles: (4 sessions, 1976–78)
- Fabulous Thunderbirds: (1 session, 1980)
- Faces: (3 sessions, 1970–71)
- John Fahey: (1 session, 1969)
- Fairport Convention: (12 sessions, 1967–74)
- Andy Fairweather Low: (2 sessions, 1975–77)
- Th' Faith Healers: (5 sessions, 1991–94)
- The Fall: (24 sessions, 1978–2004)
- Family: (9 sessions, 1967–73)
- The Family Cat: (3 sessions, 1989–92)
- Famous Jug Band: (1 session, 1969)
- Fantasmagroover: (2 sessions, 1999–2000)
- Farm: (6 sessions, 1983–91)
- Farmer's Boys: (2 sessions, 1983–84)
- Fat Grapple: (1 session, 1973)
- Fat Mattress: (1 session, 1969)
- The Fatima Mansions: (2 sessions, 1989–90)
- Faust: (2 sessions, 1973–98)
- Charlie Feathers: (1 session, 1977)
- Andy Fernbach: (1 session, 1969)
- Fflaps: (2 sessions, 1988–90)
- Fiasco: (1 session, 1993)
- The Field Mice: (1 session, 1990)
- Filler: (1 session, 1990)
- Filthkick: (2 sessions, 1989–90)
- Fingerprintz: (1 session, 1978)
- Finitribe: (3 sessions, 1985–98)
- Fire: (1 session, 1984)
- The Fire Engines: (2 sessions, 1981)
- Fire Party: (1 session, 1989)
- fIREHOSE: (1 session, 1988)
- Fireworks: (1 session, 1983)
- First Offence: (1 session, 1991)
- Fitz of Depression: (1 session, 1995)
- Patrik Fitzgerald: (3 sessions, 1978–79)
- Five Blind Boys of Alabama (26 May 1992)
- Five Hand Reel: (4 sessions, 1975–78)
- Fixit Kid: (1 session, 2002)
- The Flaming Lips: (2 sessions, 1992–99)
- Flaming Stars: (8 sessions, 1995–2002)
- Flatback 4: (1 session, 1994)
- Flatbackers: (1 session, 1980)
- The Flatmates: (2 sessions, 1987–88)
- Fleece: (1 session, 1998)
- Fleetwood Mac: (9 sessions, 1967–71)
- Flesh for Lulu: (1 session, 1982)
- Flinch: (1 session, 1994)
- Flipper: (1 session, 1993)
- Float Up CP: (1 session, 1984)
- A Flock of Seagulls: (1 session, 1981)
- Florists: (1 session, 1983)
- Flossie & the Unicorns: (1 session, 1999)
- The Flowers: (1 session, 1979)
- Fluke: (4 sessions, 1990–2002)
- The Flying Pickets: (1 session, 1983)
- Flying Saucer Attack: (2 sessions, 1995–96)
- The Flys: (3 sessions, 1978–79)
- Foetus (band): (3 sessions, 1982–84)
- Fokkewolf: (1 session, 1999)
- The Folk Devils: (3 sessions, 1984–85)
- The Folk Implosion: (1 session, 1997)
- Fonn: (1 session, 1999)
- Wayne Fontana: (1 session, 1973)
- Force Fed: (2 sessions, 1990–91)
- Foreheads in a Fishtank: (2 sessions, 1991–93)
- Forest: (3 sessions, 1969–70)
- Formerly Fat Harry: (1 session, 1970)
- FortDax: (1 session, 2004)
- Forty Fives: (2 sessions, 2003–04)
- Chris Foster: (1 session, 1977)
- Fotheringay: (1 session, 1970)
- Fotomoto: (1 session, 2004)
- The Foundations: (1 session, 1968)
- Four Brothers: (4 sessions, 1988–2000)
- Four Tet: (1 session, 2003)
- Foyer des Arts: (1 session, 1986)
- Frames: (1 session, 1981)
- Frank & Walters: (1 session, 1991)
- Frank Chickens: (6 sessions, 1983–89)
- Jackson C. Frank: (1 session, 1968)
- Frankfurter: (1 session, 1987)
- Frankie Goes to Hollywood: (2 sessions, 1982–83)
- Frantic Elevators: (2 sessions, 1981)
- Andy Fraser Band: (1 session, 1975)
- Freaks: (1 session, 1971)
- Freddy Fresh: (2 sessions, 1999–2003)
- Free: (4 sessions, 1968–70)
- Freefall: (1 session, 1992)
- The Freeze: (2 sessions, 1980–81)
- Freeze Frame: (2 sessions, 1983–84)
- F.S.K.: (7 sessions, 1985–2004)
- French: (2 sessions, 2003–04)
- Fripp & Eno: (1 session, 1973)
- Fred Frith: (1 session, 1974)
- Front 242: (1 session, 1986)
- Fruit Machine: (1 session, 1982)
- Fuck: (3 sessions, 1997–2004)
- Fudge Tunnel: (2 sessions, 1990–92)
- Fugazi: (1 session, 1988)
- Fugees: (2 sessions, 1994–96)
- Fumble: (1 session, 1972)
- Fun-Da-Mental: (3 sessions, 1992–94)
- Funboy Five: (1 session, 1979)
- The Funkees: (2 sessions, 1974–75)
- Funky Ginger: (1 session, 1988)
- Finbar and Eddie Furey: (3 sessions, 1972–74)
- Furious Pig: (1 session, 1980)
- Further: (1 session, 1995)
- The Future Sound of London: (3 sessions, 1992–97)
- The Futureheads: (1 session, 2003)
- The Fuzztones: (1 session, 1985)

== G ==
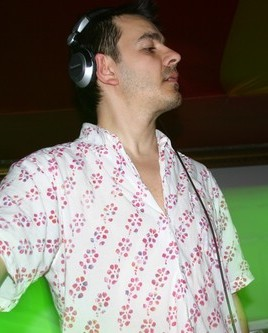
Laurent Garnier recorded a session in 1995.

- Gaffa: (1 session, 1979)
- Gag: (1 session, 1993)
- Galaxie 500: (2 sessions, 1989–90)
- Gallagher and Lyle: (1 session, 1973)
- Rory Gallagher: (1 session, 1973)
- Galliard: (1 session, 1970)
- Gallon Drunk: (1 session, 1991)
- Lance Gambit Trio: (1 session, 1997)
- Gang of Four: (3 sessions, 1979–81)
- Garlic: (1 session, 2001)
- Laurent Garnier: (1 session, 1995)
- Gasworks: (2 sessions, 1969–73)
- Dick Gaughan: (3 sessions, 1973–77)
- Gazelle: (1 session, 1975)
- Ron Geesin: (7 sessions, 1968–76)
- Gene: (6 sessions, 1996–2001)
- Gene Loves Jezebel: (2 sessions, 1983–84)
- Generation X: (3 sessions, 1977–79)
- Genesis: (2 sessions, 1970–72)
- Gentle Giant: (7 sessions, 1971–75)
- Gentle People: (1 session, 1997)
- George & Martha: (1 session, 1988)
- Gerry and the Pacemakers: (1 session, 1973)
- Steve Gibbons Band: (3 sessions, 1976–77)
- Gilbert: (1 session, 1968)
- Gilded Lil: (1 session, 1998)
- Gilgamesh: (2 sessions, 1974–75)
- Girlfrendo: (1 session, 1997)
- Girls at Our Best!: (1 session, 1981)
- Glass Menagerie: (2 sessions, 1968–69)
- Glass Torpedoes: (1 session, 1980)
- Glaxo Babies: (2 sessions, 1979–80)
- Glencoe: (4 sessions, 1972–73)
- Global Communication (aka Reload): (1 session, 1994)
- Global Village Trucking Company: (3 sessions, 1974–75)
- Gnidrolog: (1 session, 1971)
- Go Hole: (1 session, 1987)
- Goatboy: (1 session, 2002)
- The Go-Betweens: (2 sessions, 1982–84)
- God Is My Co-Pilot: (4 sessions, 1993–97)
- The God Machine: (1 session, 1992)
- Godflesh: (1 session, 1989)
- Godspeed You! Black Emperor: (1 session, 1998)
- Goldchains: (1 session, 2002)
- Golden Starlet: (1 session, 1995)
- Golden Virgins: (1 session, 2003)
- John Golding: (2 sessions, 1974–75)
- Gong: (3 sessions, 1971–74)
- Gonzalez: (3 sessions, 1974–75)
- Goober Patrol: (1 session, 1995)
- Good Habit: (1 session, 1972)
- Philip Goodhand-Tait: (2 sessions, 1972–74)
- Gore: (3 sessions, 1987–91)
- Gorky's Zygotic Mynci: (8 sessions, 1993–2003)
- Gossip: (1 session, 2003)
- John Gourd: (1 session, 1968)
- Davy Graham: (1 session, 1968)
- Grandaddy: (1 session, 1998)
- Grandmaster Gareth: (1 session, 2003)
- Grapefruit: (1 session, 1968)
- Great Crash: (1 session, 1973)
- Great Leap Forward: (2 sessions, 1987–88)
- Greaves Blegvad: (1 session, 1977)
- Greenhouse: (1 session, 1991)
- Greyhound: (2 sessions, 1971)
- Griffin: (1 session, 1969)
- Grifters: (2 sessions, 1994–96)
- Carol Grimes: (1 session, 1974)
- Stefan Grossman: (1 session, 1968)
- Groundation: (1 session, 1981)
- The Groundhogs: (4 sessions, 1970–75)
- Grover: (1 session, 2001)
- Gruppo Sportivo: (1 session, 1978)
- Guana Batz: (4 sessions, 1984–85)
- Guided by Voices: (2 sessions, 1996–99)
- Isaac Guillory: (1 session, 1972)
- Gumball: (2 sessions, 1990–91)
- Gun: (2 sessions, 1967–68)
- Gunshot: (2 sessions, 1991–94)
- Guv'ner: (1 session, 1995)
- A Guy Called Gerald (3 sessions, 1988–95)
- Gymslips: (5 sessions, 1982–84)
- Gypsy: (3 sessions, 1971–73)

== H ==
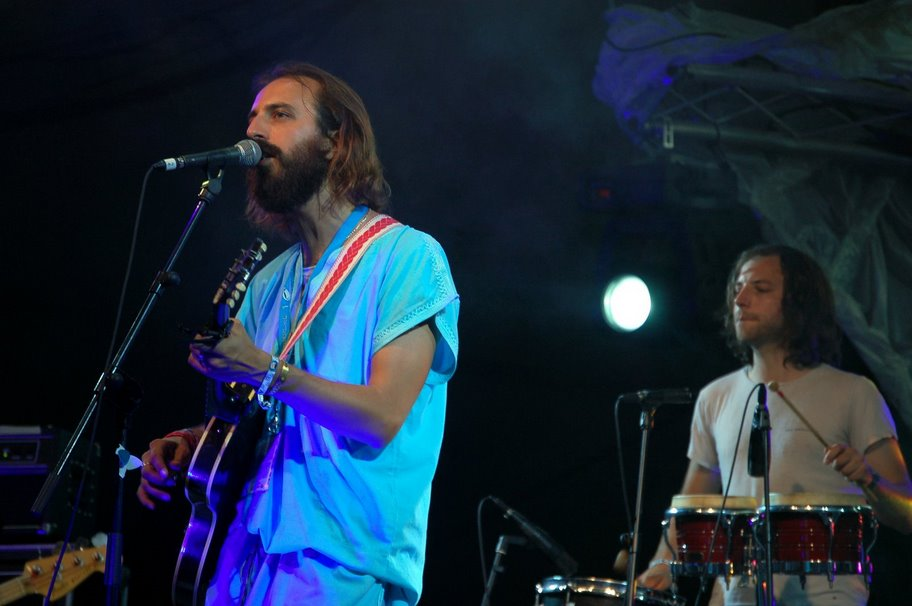
Herman Düne recorded six sessions between 2000 and 2004.

- Hagar the Womb: (1 session, 1984)
- Hakan Libdo: (1 session, 2004)
- Half Japanese: (3 sessions, 1993–97)
- Half Man Half Biscuit: (12 sessions, 1985–2004)
- Lianne Hall: (3 sessions, 2000–01)
- Ha-Lo: (1 session, 1999)
- Claire Hammill: (1 session, 1972)
- Peter Hammill: (5 sessions, 1973–79)
- Happy Few: (1 session, 1982)
- Happy Flowers: (1 session, 1990)
- Happy Mondays: (2 sessions, 1986–89)
- Hard Corps: (1 session, 1984)
- Hard Meat: (2 sessions, 1969)
- Tim Hardin: (1 session, 1968)
- Chris Hardy: (3 sessions, 1972–74)
- Roy Harper: (10 sessions, 1969–78)
- Harpies: (1 session, 2004)
- Tim Hart & Maddy Prior: (2 sessions, 1968–71)
- Mike Hart: (1 session, 1968)
- Keef Hartley: (5 sessions, 1969–72)
- Phil Hartley: (1 session, 1988)
- PJ Harvey: (9 sessions, 1991–2004)
- Harvey's Rabbit: (1 session, 1994)
- Hatfield & The North: (4 sessions, 1973–74)
- Richie Havens: (2 sessions, 1969)
- Hawkwind: (2 sessions, 1970–71)
- Bryn Haworth: (3 sessions, 1974–76)
- Richie Hawtin: (3 sessions, 1994–2004)
- Richie Hawtin & John Acquavica: (1 session, 2000)
- HDQ: (2 sessions, 1988–89)
- Head of David: (4 sessions, 1986–89)
- Headcleaner: (1 session, 1992)
- Headhunters: (1 session, 1983)
- Heads: (3 sessions, 1995–2000)
- Heads Hands & Feet: (2 sessions, 1972)
- Heart Throbs: (2 sessions, 1989–90)
- Heavenly: (2 sessions, 1991–94)
- Heavy Metal Kids: (1 session, 1974)
- Hefner: (10 sessions, 1998–2004)
- John Hegley: (1 session, 1996)
- Helen and the Horns: (3 sessions, 1983–84)
- Helen Love: (1 session, 1997)
- Hellacopters: (2 sessions, 1999–2003)
- Hells: (1 session, 2004)
- Helmet: (1 session, 1991)
- Help Yourself: (3 sessions, 1971–73)
- Jimi Hendrix Experience: (2 sessions, 1967)
- Christie Hennessy: (1 session, 1974)
- Henry Cow: (6 sessions, 1971–75)
- Hepburns: (1 session, 1989)
- Herd: (1 session, 1967)
- Here: (1 session, 1993)
- Here & Now: (1 session, 1978)
- Here's Johnny: (1 session, 1983)
- Heresy: (3 sessions, 1987–89)
- Herman Dune: (7 sessions, 2000–04)
- Mike Heron's Reputation: (2 sessions, 1975–77)
- Hey Paulette: (1 session, 1989)
- Hi-Fi: (1 session, 1979)
- Hiding Place: (1 session, 1977)
- The High Fidelity: (2 sessions, 1998–2000)
- High Five: (3 sessions, 1982–84)
- High Level Ranters: (2 sessions, 1972–74)
- High Tide: (3 sessions, 1969–70)
- Higsons: (5 sessions, 1981–84)
- Roy Hill Band: (2 sessions, 1978–79)
- Holger Hiller: (1 session, 1987)
- Hint: (1 session, 2002)
- Hirameka Hi Fi: (2 sessions, 1998–2002)
- The Hitchers (band): (1 session, 1997)
- Hits: (1 session, 1978)
- The Hives: (1 session, 2001)
- Hixxy: (2 sessions, 2004)
- Hockett: (1 session, 1972)
- Hofman: (1 session, 1998)
- Hole: (2 sessions, 1991–93)
- Holle Holle: (1 session, 1987)
- Tim Hollier: (1 session, 1968)
- Hollies: (1 session, 1967)
- Holy Ghost: (1 session, 1995)
- Holy Mackerel: (2 sessions, 1972)
- Holy Willie's Prayer: (1 session, 1970)
- Home: (5 sessions, 1971–73)
- A Homeboy A Hippie & A Funky Dread: (1 session, 1991)
- Homesick James & Grizelda: (1 session, 1970)
- Honey Bus: (5 sessions, 1967–72)
- Honeymoon Killers: (1 session, 1982)
- Hood: (1 session, 1995)
- Hooton 3 Car: (3 sessions, 1995–97)
- The Hoovers: (1 session, 1991)
- Hopewell: (1 session, 2001)
- Hopper: (1 session, 1994)
- Horslips: (3 sessions, 1973–74)
- Hot Snakes: (1 session, 2004)
- Hot Water: (1 session, 1978)
- A House: (2 sessions, 1987–92)
- House of Love: (6 sessions, 1988–92)
- Housemartins: (4 sessions, 1985–87)
- Huevos Rancheros: (1 session, 1995)
- Huggy Bear: (2 sessions, 1992–93)
- Hula: (3 sessions, 1985–86)
- Hula Hoop: (2 sessions, 1992–93)
- Alan Hull: (4 sessions, 1973–76)
- Human League: (1 session, 1978)
- Human Orchestra: (1 session, 1976)
- Humanoid: (1 session, 1988)
- Humble Pie: (1 session, 1969)
- Humblebums: (1 session, 1970)
- Hunches: (1 session, 2004)
- Michael Hurley: (1 session, 1999)
- Hybirds: (1 session, 1997)
- Hyper Kinako: (1 session, 2003)
- Hypnotone: (1 session, 1991)

== I ==
- I Am Kloot: (2 sessions, 2001–04)
- I, Ludicrous: (1 session, 1987)
- Ian Rush: (1 session, 1993)
- Icarus: (1 session, 1980)
- Icarus Line: (2 sessions, 2001–02)
- Ice: (1 session, 1967)
- Icicle Works: (3 sessions, 1982–84)
- Icon AD: (1 session, 1982)
- Ictus: (1 session, 2004)
- Idiot Dancers: (1 session, 1980)
- Idle Race: (6 sessions, 1967–69)
- If: (1 session, 1972)
- Ifang Bondi: (1 session, 1990)
- Ikara Colt: (4 sessions, 2001–04)
- I'm Being Good: (2 sessions, 1994–2003)
- I'm So Hollow: (1 session, 1980)
- Immortal Lee County Killers: (2 sessions, 2003)
- In Camera: (1 session, 1980)
- In Dust : (1 session, 1993)
- In Excelsis: (1 session, 1984)
- Inca Babies: (4 sessions, 1984–86)
- Incredible String Band: (12 sessions, 1967–2000)
- Innersphere: (1 session, 1995)
- Neil Innes: (3 sessions, 1972–77)
- Inside Out: (1 session, 1991)
- Inspiral Carpets: (4 sessions, 1988–90)
- Intense Degree: (1 session, 1988)
- Inter: (2 sessions, 1997–99)
- Interpol: (1 session, 2001)
- Irresistible Force: (2 sessions, 1992–93)
- Gregory Isaacs & Roots Radics: (2 sessions, 1981–82)
- Isan: (1 session, 1999)
- Isotope: (3 sessions, 1974–75)
- It's Immaterial: (4 sessions, 1981–85)
- Izzys: (1 session, 2003)

== J ==
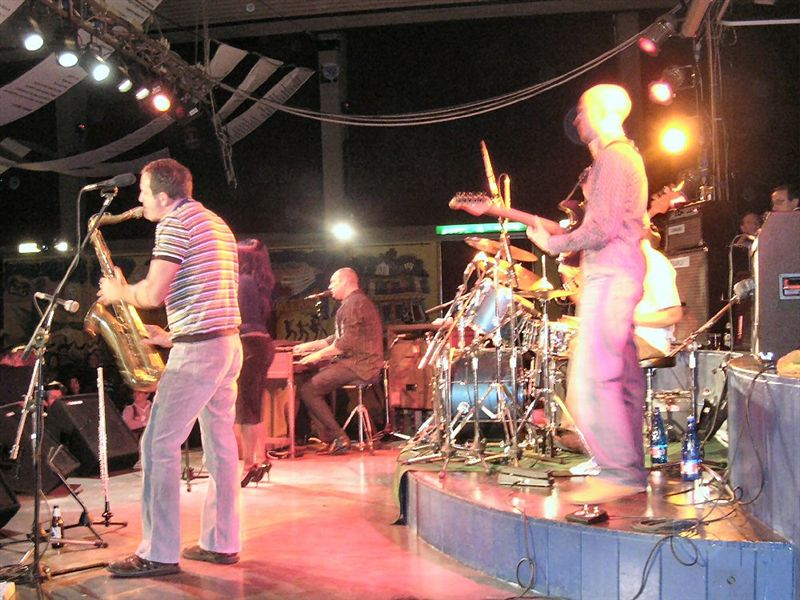
James Taylor Quartet recorded a session in 1987.

- J Church: (1 session, 1993)
- John Cale: (1 session, May 1975)
- Jabula: (1 session, 1974)
- Jack Drag: (1 session, 2001)
- Jack the Lad: (8 sessions, 1973–76)
- David Jack: (1 session, 2003)
- Jackdaw With Crowbar: (2 sessions, 1987)
- JJ Jackson & The Urchins: (1 session, 1967)
- Joe Jackson: (1 session, 1979)
- Jacktars: (1 session, 1989)
- Jacob's Mouse: (2 sessions, 1992)
- Jale: (1 session, 1994)
- The Jam: (3 sessions, 1977–79)
- James: (4 sessions, 1983–90)
- John Cale: (1 session, 1975)
- John James: (1 session, 1968)
- Nicky James Band: (1 session, 1973)
- Janitors: (3 sessions, 1985–87)
- Bert Jansch: (1 session, 1968)
- Jasmine Minks: (1 session, 1986)
- Jass Babies: (1 session, 1981)
- Jawbone: (1 session, 2004)
- Jawbox: (1 session, 1994)
- Jeans Team: (1 session, 2003)
- Jellicoe: (1 session, 2001)
- Jelly Bread: (2 sessions, 1972)
- Jellyfish Kiss: (1 session, 1990)
- Jesus and Mary Chain: (6 sessions, 1984–98)
- Jesus Lizard: (2 sessions, 1991–92)
- Jet: (1 session, 1975)
- Jethro Tull: (3 sessions, 1968–69)
- Joeyfat: (1 session, 2003)
- Elton John: (2 sessions, 1968–73)
- Larry Johnson: (1 session, 1970)
- Linton Kwesi Johnson: (2 sessions, 1979–81)
- Paul Johnson: (1 session, 1987)
- Wilko Johnson: (1 session, 1978)
- Sophie and Peter Johnston: (2 sessions, 1983)
- Johnstons: (1 session, 1972)
- Jolt: (1 session, 1995)
- Jon E Cash: (1 session, 2004)
- Nic Jones: (8 sessions, 1972–77)
- Wizz Jones: (3 sessions, 1969–72)
- Joolz: (1 session, 1984)
- Josef K: (2 sessions, 1981)
- Joy Division: (2 sessions, 1979)
- Joyrider: (2 sessions, 1995–96)
- JSD Band: (7 sessions, 1972–74)
- Ju Ju: (2 sessions, 1982–83)
- Jubilee Allstars: (1 session, 1996)
- Juggernaughts: (1 session, 1984)
- Juicy Lucy: (1 session, 1969)
- Juke Boy Bonner: (1 session, 1969)
- Jules Verne: (1 session, 1992)
- June Brides: (1 session, 1985)
- Junior Gee and the Capital Boys: (1 session, 1984)
- Junior's Eyes: (2 sessions, 1968–69)
- Mickey Jupp: (2 sessions, 1971–78)
- Just Us: (1 session, 1972)

== K ==
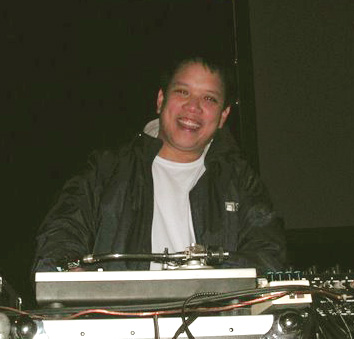
Kid Koala recorded a session in 2000.

- K K Kings: (1 session, 1994)
- Kaisers: (1 session, 1995)
- Kaito: (1 session, 2001)
- Kaleidoscope: (1 session, 1967)
- Kan Kan: (1 session, 1982)
- Kanda Bongo Man: (2 sessions, 1993–2003)
- Armory Kane: (1 session, 1968)
- Karamasov: (1 session, 1999)
- Katch 22: (1 session, 1991)
- Kelis: (1 session, 2000)
- Dave Kelly: (1 session, 1968)
- Jo-Ann Kelly: (1 session, 1968)
- Kenickie: (2 sessions, 1995–96)
- Kerb: (1 session, 1998)
- Keys: (1 session, 2003)
- Imrat Khan: (2 sessions, 1969–70)
- Vilayat Khan: (1 session, 1968)
- Khartomb: (1 session, 1982)
- Khaya: (2 sessions, 1999–2000)
- Kick Partners: (1 session, 1983)
- Kid 606 Vs. Remote Viewer: (1 session, 2000)
- Kid Koala: (1 session, 2000)
- Kidnapper: (1 session, 1997)
- Killing Floor: (1 session, 1969)
- Killing Joke: (5 sessions, 1979–83)
- Killjoys: (2 sessions, 1977–78)
- Kills: (1 session, 2003)
- William E Kimber and The Ian Green Orchestra: (1 session, 1967)
- King: (1 session, 1978)
- King Biscuit Boy: (1 session, 1971)
- King Crimson: (2 sessions, 1969)
- King of the Slums: (1 session, 1988)
- Kings of Oblivion: (1 session, 1990)
- Kingsbury Manx: (1 session, 2000)
- Kinks: (4 sessions, 1967–74)
- Kiss AMC: (1 session, 1989)
- KIT: (1 session, 1989)
- Kitchens of Distinction: (1 session, 1992)
- Klezmatics: (1 session, 1992)
- Klute: (1 session, 1998)
- Knights of the Occasional Table: (1 session, 1993)
- Buddy Knox & Bad River: (1 session, 1970)
- Spider John Koerner: (1 session, 1968)
- Kokomo: (3 sessions, 1974–75)
- Dembo Konte and Kausu Kouyate: (1 session, 1989)
- Alexis Korner: (1 session, 1969)
- Leo Kottke: (1 session, 1977)
- Billy J. Kramer: (1 session, 1973)
- Krispy Three: (2 sessions, 1990–91)
- Kursaal Flyers: (1 session, 1975)
- Fela Kuti: (1 session, 1973)

== L ==
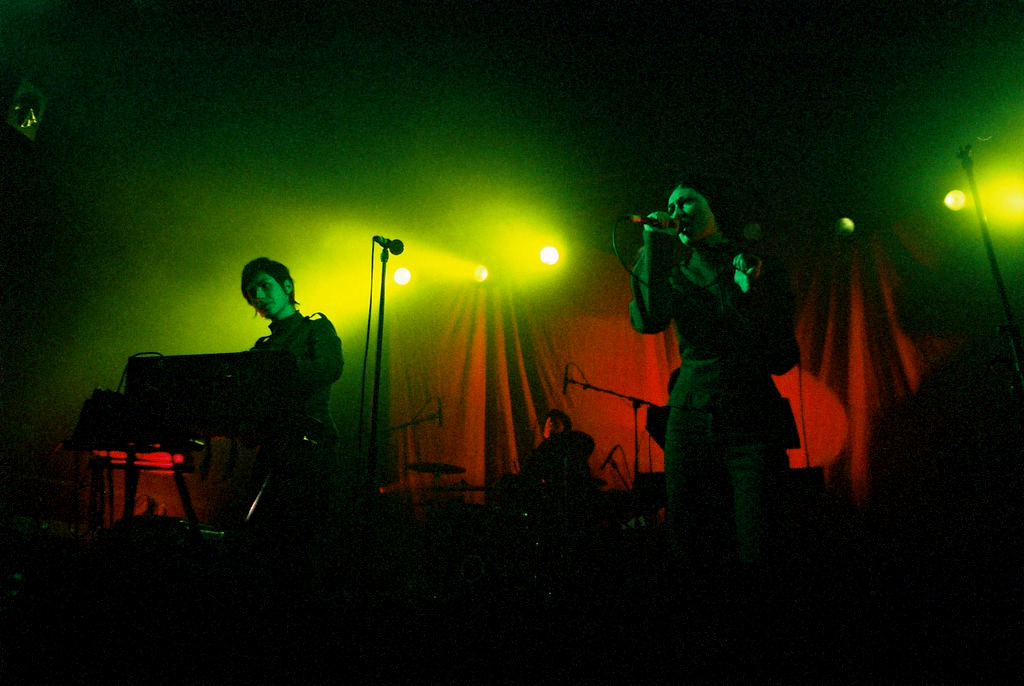
Ladytron recorded two sessions in 2001 and 2002.

- Lab 4: (1 session, 2001)
- Labradford: (2 sessions, 1994–96)
- Ladytron: (2 sessions, 2001–02)
- Laibach: (2 sessions, 1986–87)
- Laika: (1 session, 2000)
- Denny Laine and the Electric String Band: (2 sessions, 1967–68)
- Lali Puna: (1 session, 2004)
- Land of Nod: (1 session, 2003)
- Landscape: (1 session, 1978)
- Neil Landstrumm & Tobia Schmidt: (1 session, 1998)
- Ronnie Lane's Slim Chance: (3 sessions, 1973–76)
- Lash Lariat and the Long Riders: (2 sessions, 1985)
- Last Party: (2 sessions, 1987–89)
- Laugh: (2 sessions, 1986–87)
- Laughing Clowns: (1 session, 1982)
- L'Augmentation: (1 session, 1999)
- Laura Logic: (2 sessions, 1979–81)
- Laurel and Hardy: (1 session, 1982)
- Gasper Lawal Band: (1 session, 1971)
- The League of Gentleman: (1 session, 1980)
- Leatherface: (3 sessions, 1991–93)
- Led Zeppelin: (3 sessions, 1969)
- Alvin Lee & Mylon LeFevre: (1 session, 1973)
- Leisure Process: (1 session, 1982)
- Lemonheads: (1 session, 1989)
- Deke Leonard: (3 sessions, 1973–78)
- Leopards: (2 sessions, 1997–98)
- Les Thugs: (1 session, 1987)
- Levellers 5: (3 sessions, 1990–92)
- G. Lewis and D.C. Gilbert: (1 session, 1980)
- Jeffrey Lewis: (1 session, 2002)
- Leyton Buzzards: (4 sessions, 1978–80)
- LFO: (1 session, 1990)
- Liars: (2 sessions, 2002–04)
- Liberator DJs & The London Acid Techno Mafia: (1 session, 1997)
- Lift to Experience: (3 sessions, 2001)
- Ligament: (1 session, 1995)
- Liggers: (1 session, 1980)
- Light: (1 session, 1999)
- Gordon Lightfoot: (1 session, 1969)
- Lightning Bolt: (1 session, 2004)
- Lillian: (1 session, 1997)
- Lindisfarne: (6 sessions, 1971–74)
- Lines: (2 sessions, 1980–81)
- Little Bob Story: (2 sessions, 1977)
- Little George Sueref: (1 session, 2001)
- Little Killers: (1 session, 2004)
- Little Red Duffle Coats: (1 session, 1981)
- Live Skull: (1 session, 1989)
- Liverpool Scene: (3 sessions, 1969–70)
- Livingstone: (1 session, 1995)
- Robert Lloyd: (5 sessions, 1987–90)
- Llwybr Llaethog: (4 sessions, 1987–2001)
- Anna Lockwood: (1 session, 1969)
- Locus: (1 session, 2003)
- The Locust: (1 session, 2001)
- Lo-Fi Generator: (1 session, 1999)
- Lois: (1 session, 1993)
- Lolita Storm: (2 sessions, 1999–2000)
- Lone Star: (3 sessions, 1976–77)
- Loop: (3 sessions, 1987–90)
- Loop Guru: (3 sessions, 1993–97)
- Lorimer: (1 session, 2000)
- The Lotus Eaters: (2 sessions, 1982–83)
- Loudspeaker: (1 session, 1992)
- Louisiana Red: (1 session, 1977)
- Love Blobs: (1 session, 1992)
- Love Child: (1 session, 1992)
- Love Is All: (1 session, 2004)
- Love Junk: (1 session, 1997)
- Love Sculpture: (3 sessions, 1968–69)
- Loves: (4 sessions, 2001–02)
- Lene Lovich: (2 sessions, 1978–79)
- Low: (4 sessions, 1999–2003)
- L7: (1 session, 1990)
- Lucys: (1 session, 1981)
- Luddites: (1 session, 1983)
- Ludus: (1 session, 1982)
- Luggage: (1 session, 1995)
- Lulu: (1 session, 1967)
- Luna: (1 session, 1992)
- Lunachicks: (1 session, 1989)
- Lungleg: (2 sessions, 1995–96)
- Lupine Howl: (1 session, 2000)
- Lurkers: (4 sessions, 1977–79)
- Luscious Jackson: (1 session, 1995)
- Lush: (1 session, 1990)

== M ==
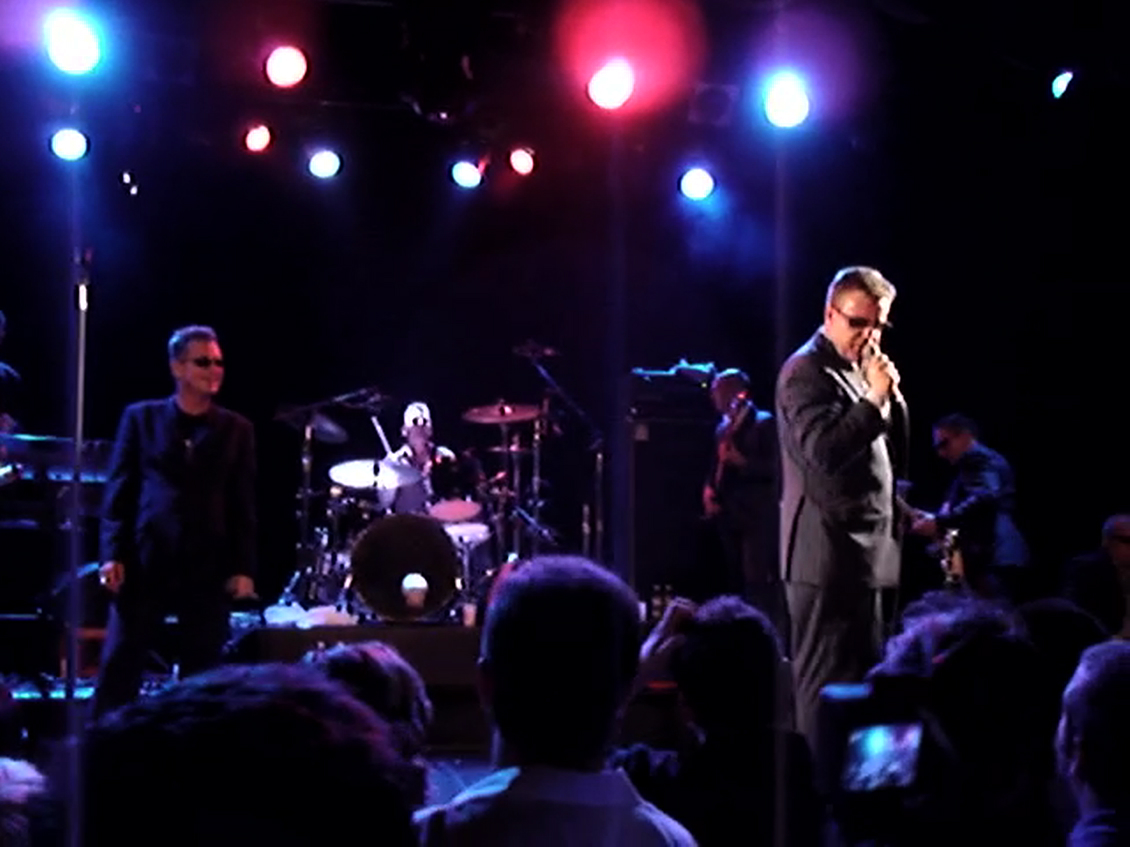
Madness recorded a session in 1979.

- Mabel Greer's Toyshop: (1 session, 1968)
- Andy Mackay: (1 session, 1974)
- Billy Mackenzie: (1 session, 1983)
- Mackenzies: (2 sessions, 1986)
- Macrocosmica: (1 session, 1997)
- Mad Professor: (1 session, 1982)
- Madder Rose: (2 sessions, 1993–94)
- Madness: (1 session, 1979)
- Magazine: (4 sessions, 1978–80)
- Magic Band: (1 session, 2004)
- Magic Dirt: (1 session, 1997)
- Magic Hour: (1 session, 1994)
- Magma: (1 session, 1974)
- Magnapop: (1 session, 1993)
- Magoo: (7 sessions, 1995–2004)
- Maher Shalal Hash Baz: (1 session, 2003)
- Make-Up: (2 sessions, 1997–99)
- Malaria!: (1 session, 1981)
- Male Nurse: (2 sessions, 1997–98)
- Malicorne: (2 sessions, 1974–75)
- Batti Mamzelle: (1 session, 1974)
- Man: (3 sessions, 1972–74)
- Man or Astro-man?: (6 sessions, 1993–2000)
- Mandrake Paddle Steamer: (1 session, 1969)
- Manfred Mann: (2 sessions, 1968)
- Manfred Mann Chapter Three: (1 session, 1970)
- Manfred Mann's Earth Band: (4 sessions, 1971–1973)
- Mangrove Steel Band: (1 session, 1987)
- Manic Street Preachers: (3 sessions, 1992–1994)
- Mansun: (3 sessions, 1995–2000)
- Phil Manzanera & 801: (1 session, 1977)
- Thomas Mapfumo: (1 session, 1998)
- Mike Maran: (5 sessions, 1972–74)
- March Violets: (3 sessions, 1982–84)
- Marine Girls: (2 sessions, 1982–83)
- Marine Research: (2 sessions, 1999)
- Mark-Almond: (1 session, 1972)
- Bob Marley and the Wailers: (2 sessions, 1973)
- Marlowe: (1 session, 2003)
- Martian Dance: (2 sessions, 1980–81)
- Caroline Martin: (3 sessions, 1999–2003)
- Caroline Martin & Lianne Hall: (1 session, 2004)
- John Martyn: (7 sessions, 1968–78)
- Brett Marvin and the Thunderbolts: (1 session, 1970)
- Marxman: (1 session, 1992)
- Masasu: (1 session, 1990)
- J Mascis: (2 sessions, 2000–02)
- Mason, Capaldi, Wood and Frog: (1 session, 1969)
- M.A.S.S.: (1 session, 2002)
- MASS: (1 session, 1991)
- Caspar Brotzman Massaker: (1 session, 1995)
- Matching Mole: (3 sessions, 1972)
- Matthews' Southern Comfort: (2 sessions, 1970)
- Iain Matthews: (1 session, 1971)
- Matumbi: (2 sessions, 1978)
- Harvey Matusow's Jew's Harp Band: (1 session, 1968)
- Max Tundra: (1 session, 2004)
- Maximum Joy: (2 sessions, 1981–82)
- John Mayall's Blues Breakers: (2 sessions, 1967–68)
- Big Maybelle and the Senate: (1 session, 1967)
- Michael Mayer: (1 session, 2003)
- Mazey Fade: (3 sessions, 1993–95)
- MC 900 Foot Jesus & DJ Zero: (1 session, 1990)
- MC Buzz B: (1 session, 1990)
- MC Duke: (1 session, 1987)
- MC Mabon: (1 session, 2000)
- MC Solaar: (1 session, 1994)
- McCarthy: (3 sessions, 1986–88)
- Cass McCombs: (1 session, 2003)
- Ian McCulloch: (1 session, 1989)
- Country Joe McDonald: (3 sessions, 1970–77)
- Mississippi Fred McDowell: (1 session, 1969)
- Wes McGhee: (1 session, 1976)
- McGuinness Flint: (1 session, 1972)
- John McLaughlin & Shakti: (1 session, 1977)
- Mclusky: (2 sessions, 2002–04)
- Ralph McTell: (8 sessions, 1970–76)
- David McWilliams: (1 session, 1968)
- MDC: (1 session, 1987)
- Me Against Them: (2 sessions, 2002–04)
- Meanwhile, Back in Communist Russia: (2 sessions, 2001–03)
- Meat Beat Manifesto: (1 session, 1992)
- Meat Whiplash: (1 session, 1985)
- Medicine Head: (10 sessions, 1970–77)
- Mega City Four: (2 sessions, 1988–93)
- Mekons: (6 sessions, 1978–87)
- Melanie: (1 session, 1969)
- George Melly: (1 session, 1972)
- Mel-O-Tones: (1 session, 1985)
- Melt-Banana: (2 sessions, 1999–2001)
- Melvins: (1 session, 1991)
- Melys: (9 sessions, 1997–2004)
- The Members: (3 sessions, 1979–81)
- Membranes: (1 session, 1984)
- Men They Couldn't Hang: (3 sessions, 1984–85)
- Menswear: (1 session, 1995)
- Mercury Rev: (5 sessions, 1991–2001)
- Max Merritt and the Meteors: (3 sessions, 1972–76)
- Merton Parkas: (1 session, 1979)
- Métal Urbain: (2 sessions, 1978)
- Meteors: (4 sessions, 1981–85)
- Method Actors: (1 session, 1981)
- Metrotone: (1 session, 1998)
- Miaow: (2 sessions, 1986–87)
- Microdisney: (6 sessions, 1983–86)
- Midget: (1 session, 1997)
- Midnight Choir: (1 session, 1987)
- Midnight Evils: (1 session, 2003)
- Midway Still: (1 session, 1991)
- Mighty Baby: (1 session, 1969)
- Mighty Force: (1 session, 1990)
- Mighty Lemon Drops: (1 session, 1986)
- Mighty Math: (1 session, 2001)
- Mighty Mighty: (3 sessions, 1986–87)
- Mikey Dread: (1 session, 1982)
- Milan Station: (1 session, 1981)
- Milk: (1 session, 1991)
- Milk Monitors: (2 sessions, 1987)
- Frankie Miller: (5 sessions, 1973–79)
- Million Dead: (1 session, 2003)
- Jeff Mills: (3 sessions, 1998–2003)
- Minimal Compact: (1 session, 1985)
- Minny Pops: (1 session, 1980)
- Mint 400: (1 session, 1992)
- Mira Calix: (1 session, 2000)
- Miss Black America: (2 sessions, 2001–02)
- Miss Mend: (1 session, 1999)
- Missing Presumed Dead: (1 session, 1981)
- Misty in Roots: (9 sessions, 1979–2002)
- Joni Mitchell: (1 session, 1968)
- Moby Grape: (1 session, 1969)
- The Models: (1 session, 1977)
- Moderates: (1 session, 1981)
- Modern English: (2 sessions, 1980–81)
- Modern Eon: (1 session, 1981)
- Modernaires: (1 session, 1982)
- Mo-Dettes: (3 sessions, 1980–81)
- Mogwai: (5 sessions, 1996–2003)
- Moles: (1 session, 1992)
- Molesters: (2 sessions, 1978–79)
- Zoot Money: (2 sessions, 1972–73)
- Mongrel: (1 session, 1973)
- Monitors: (1 session, 1979)
- Monkey Steals the Drum: (2 sessions, 1999–2000)
- Mono: (1 session, 2004)
- Mono Mono: (1 session, 1973)
- Monochrome Set: (3 sessions, 1979–80)
- Monoconics: (1 session, 1980)
- Monograph: (1 session, 1999)
- Moodists: (2 sessions, 1984–85)
- Moody Blues: (4 sessions, 1967–69)
- Moody Boys & Screamer: (1 session, 1991)
- Moon: (4 sessions, 1975–77)
- Moon: (1 session, 1970)
- Moondogs: (2 sessions, 1980–81)
- Moonflowers: (1 session, 1991)
- Moonrider: (1 session, 1975)
- Moonshake: (1 session, 1992)
- Moose: (2 sessions, 1991)
- More Fiends: (1 session, 1989)
- Morrissey: (1 session, 2004)
- Mos Eisley: (2 sessions, 2002–03)
- Motor Boys Motor: (1 session, 1981)
- Motor Life Co: (1 session, 1998)
- Motorcycle Boy: (1 session, 1987)
- Motörhead: (1 session, 1978)
- Motors: (2 sessions, 1977)
- Mott the Hoople: (2 sessions, 1970–71)
- The Mountain Goats: (2 sessions, 2003–04)
- Mouse on Mars: (4 sessions, 1994–2001)
- The Move: (2 sessions, 1967–68)
- The Movies: (1 session, 1977)
- Movietone: (3 sessions, 1994–97)
- Mr. Airplane Man: (2 sessions, 2003–04)
- Mr Bird: (1 session, 2001)
- Mr Fox: (2 sessions, 1970–71)
- Mr Psyche: (2 sessions, 2001–04)
- Mr Ray's Wig World: (1 session, 1992)
- Mudhoney: (2 sessions, 1989–2002)
- La Muerte: (1 session, 1986)
- Mufflon 5: (1 session, 1994)
- Mug: (1 session, 1995)
- Mugstar: (1 session, 2004)
- Mukka: (1 session, 2000)
- Mull Historical Society: (1 session, 2001)
- Múm: (1 session, 2002)
- The Mummies: (1 session, 1994)
- Murmur: (1 session, 1995)
- Pauline Murray: (1 session, 1980)
- Murry the Hump: (4 sessions, 1999–2000)
- Musical Youth: (2 sessions, 1981–82)
- Mute Drivers: (1 session, 1989)
- Mutts: (1 session, 2005)
- μ-Ziq: (2 sessions, 2000–04)
- My Bloody Valentine: (1 session, 1988)
- My Dad Is Dead: (1 session, 1990)

== N ==
- Na Fili: (3 sessions, 1973–76)
- Names: (1 session, 1982)
- Napalm Death: (3 sessions, 1987–90)
- Nasmak: (1 session, 1982)
- Nina Nastasia: (6 sessions, 2002–04)
- Nasty Pop: (1 session, 1975)
- National Head Band: (1 session, 1971)
- National Health: (3 sessions, 1976–77)
- Natural Gas: (2 sessions, 1971–72)
- Natural Scientist: (1 session, 1981)
- Naturalites: (2 sessions, 1983–85)
- Nazareth: (2 sessions, 1972–73)
- Nebula: (2 sessions, 2001–04)
- Nectarine No. 9: (5 sessions, 1993–2001)
- Ned's Atomic Dustbin: (1 session, 1990)
- Nelories: (1 session, 1993)
- Bill Nelson: (2 sessions, 1979–81)
- Neon: (1 session, 1979)
- Neon Hearts: (1 session, 1979)
- Nervous Germans: (1 session, 1980)
- Neuro Project: (1 session, 1994)
- Neutrons: (1 session, 1974)
- New Age: (1 session, 1982)
- New Age Steppers: (1 session, 1983)
- New Bad Things: (2 sessions, 1996–97)
- New Bomb Turks: (1 session, 1993)
- New Decade: (1 session, 1994)
- New Fast Automatic Daffodils: (3 sessions, 1989–93)
- A New Generation: (1 session, 1968)
- New Hearts: (1 session, 1977)
- New Model Army: (1 session, 1983)
- New Order: (3 sessions, 1981–98)
- Randy Newman: (1 session, 1974)
- News: (1 session, 1979)
- Newtown Neurotics: (1 session, 1983)
- The Nice: (7 sessions, 1967–69)
- Nicky and the Dots: (1 session, 1979)
- Nico: (2 sessions, 1971–74)
- Nightblooms: (1 session, 1990)
- Nightingales: (8 sessions, 1980–86)
- Nil: (1 session, 1996)
- Nirvana: (3 sessions, 1989–91)
- Nirvana with the Syd Dale Orchestra: (1 session, 1967)
- NoMeansNo: (2 sessions, 1988–89)
- Rab Noakes: (6 sessions, 1972–78)
- Normil Hawaiians: (1 session, 1980)
- Northpole: (1 session, 1996)
- Jimmy Norton's Explosion: (1 session, 1979)
- Noseflutes: (4 sessions, 1985–89)
- Notsensibles: (1 session, 1979)
- Nought: (2 sessions, 1997–2000)
- Novak: (1 session, 1999)
- Noxagt: (1 session, 2004)
- NSO Force: (1 session, 1989)
- Nub: (1 session, 1996)
- Nubiles: (1 session, 1995)
- Nuclear Socketts: (1 session, 1981)
- Nucleus: (4 sessions, 1970–72)
- Gary Numan: (3 sessions, 1979–2001)
- Number One Cup: (2 sessions, 1996–97)
- Numbers: (2 sessions, 2003–04)

== O ==
- A Band Called O: (4 sessions, 1974–77)
- Occasional Word Ensemble: (4 sessions, 1974–77)
- Of Arrowe Hill: (1 session, 2003)
- Offspring: (1 session, 1983)
- Oil Seed Rape: (1 session, 1993)
- Oldham Tinkers: (1 session, 1974)
- Olivia Tremor Control: (1 session, 1997)
- Dr Oloh & His Milo Jazz Band: (1 session, 1991)
- One By One: (1 session, 1991)
- Remmy Ongala: (1 session, 1993)
- Only Ones: (4 sessions, 1977–80)
- Onward International: (2 sessions, 1984)
- Ooberman: (1 session, 1999)
- Orange Juice: (2 sessions, 1980–81)
- The Orb: (6 sessions, 1989–2004)
- Orbital: (2 sessions, 1993–2004)
- Orchestra Jazira: (1 session, 1983)
- Orchestral Manoeuvres in the Dark: (4 sessions, 1979–83)
- The Orchids: (2 sessions, 1990–94)
- Original Mirrors: (1 session, 1980)
- Jim O'Rourke: (1 session, 1999)
- Orson Family: (1 session, 1983)
- Oseni: (1 session, 1973)
- Osibisa: (3 sessions, 1970–72)
- John Otway and Wild Billy Barrett: (1 session, 1978)
- Out On Blue Six: (2 sessions, 1980–81)
- The Outcasts: (2 sessions, 1981–82)
- Overlord X: (2 sessions, 1987–88)
- Oxes: (2 sessions, 2002–04)

== P ==
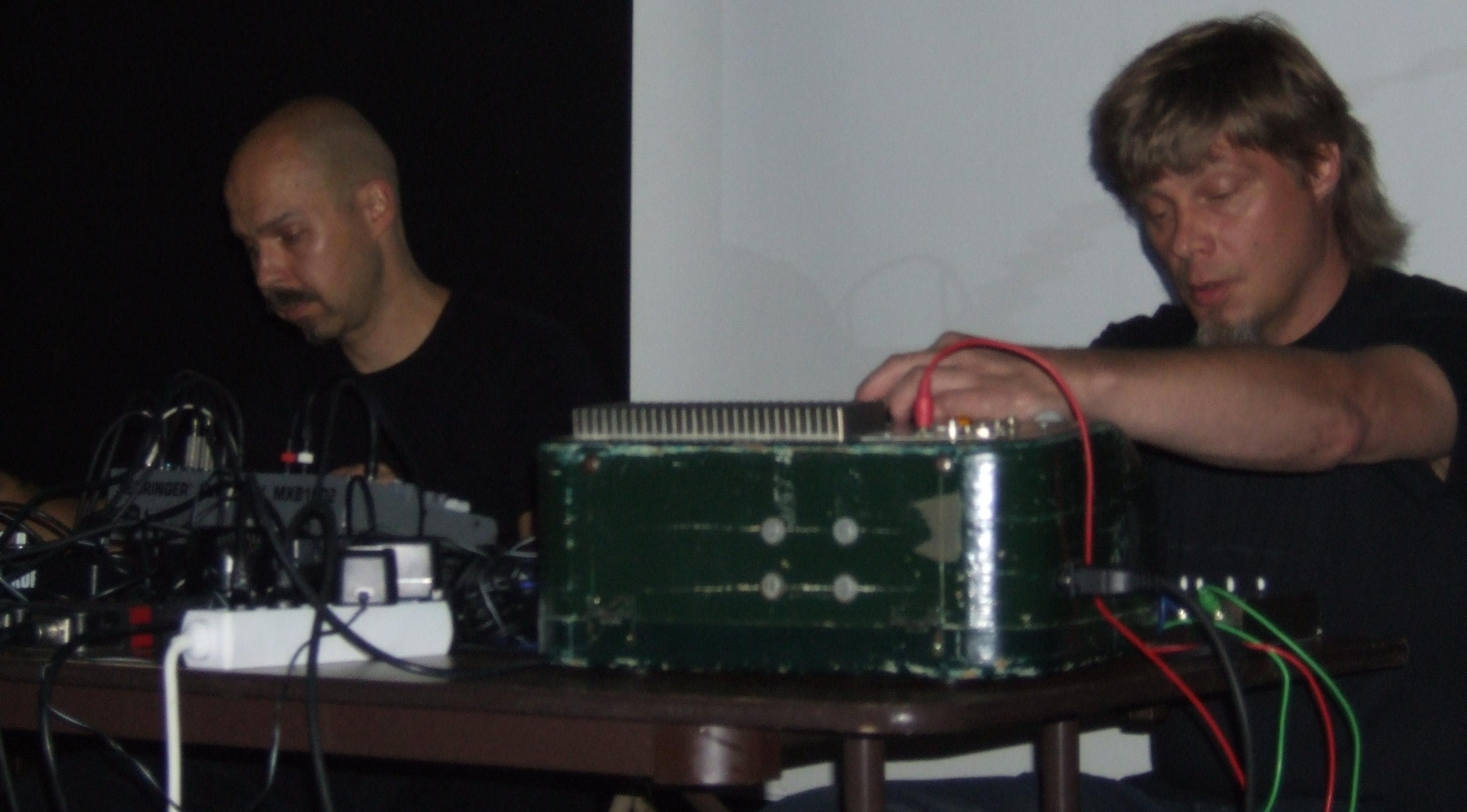
Panasonic recorded a session in 1995.

- Pachinos: (1 session, 1999)
- Pacou: (1 session, 1998)
- Palace Brothers: (4 sessions, 1993–2002)
- Paladin: (1 session, 1972)
- Palais Schaumburg: (1 session, 1982)
- Pale Fountains: (1 session, 1982)
- Pale Saints: (1 session, 1989)
- Panacea: (1 session, 1997)
- Panana Jug Band: (1 session, 1969)
- Panasonic: (1 session, 1995)
- Panoptica: (1 session, 2001)
- Papa Face: (1 session, 1984)
- Papa Levi: (1 session, 1984)
- Papa Sprain: (1 session, 1992)
- Paris Angels: (2 sessions, 1990–91)
- Graham Parker and the Rumour: (2 sessions, 1976)
- David Parker: (1 session, 1971)
- Part Chimp: (2 sessions, 2002-2004)
- Don Partridge: (1 session, 1968)
- Party Dictator: (1 session, 1991)
- The Passage: (4 sessions, 1980–82)
- The Passions: (3 sessions, 1979–80)
- Passmore Sisters: (2 sessions, 1985–86)
- Pastels: (4 sessions, 1984–99)
- Patto: (1 session, 1973)
- Pavement: (5 sessions, 1992–99)
- Peace: (1 session, 1971)
- Peaches: (3 sessions, 1974–76)
- Ann Peebles: (1 session, 1974)
- Bob Pegg and Nick Strutt: (1 session, 1973)
- Penetration: (2 sessions, 1978–79)
- Pentangle: (5 sessions, 1968–69)
- People Like Us: (1 session, 2003)
- People Under the Stairs: (1 session, 2000)
- Pere Ubu: (1 session, 1989)
- Perfect Daze: (1 session, 1988)
- Perfect Vision: (1 session, 1984)
- Christine Perfect: (1 session, 1969)
- Period: (1 session, 1978)
- Period Pains: (1 session, 1997)
- Persil: (3 sessions, 2000–04)
- Personal Column: (3 sessions, 1982–84)
- The Persuaders: (1 session, 1984)
- Pet Lamb: (2 sessions, 1994–95)
- Pet Shop Boys: (1 session, 2002)
- Peter and the Test Tube Babies: (1 session, 1980)
- Petticoats: (1 session, 1980)
- PFM: (2 sessions, 1973)
- Philistines Jr: (3 sessions, 1992–96)
- Rory Phillips: (1 session, 2002)
- Shawn Phillips: (3 sessions, 1971–74)
- Phoenix: (1 session, 1974)
- Piano Magic: (1 session, 2000)
- Piano Red: (1 session, 1977)
- Pico: (1 session, 2003)
- Pigbag: (1 session, 1981)
- Pigbros: (2 sessions, 1985–86)
- PiL (Public Image Ltd.): (1 session, 1979)
- Pilotcan: (1 session, 1999)
- Pilote: (1 session, 2000)
- Pinhole: (1 session, 2002)
- Pink Fairies: (1 session, 1970)
- Pink Floyd: (5 sessions, 1967–69)
- Pink Industry: (4 sessions, 1982–84)
- Pink Kross: (1 session, 1995)
- Pink Military: (2 sessions, 1979–80)
- Pink Peg Slax: (2 sessions, 1984–85)
- Piranhas (3 sessions, 1979–80)
- Pirates: (3 sessions, 1977–78)
- Pitchshifter: (2 sessions, 1991–93)
- Pixies: (5 sessions, 1988–91)
- Plaid: (3 sessions, 1997–2003)
- Plain Characters: (1 session, 1981)
- Plainsong: (3 sessions, 1972)
- Plant Bach Ofnus: (2 sessions, 1988–91)
- Planxty: (3 sessions, 1972–73)
- Plastic Penny: (1 session, 1968)
- Play Dead: (3 sessions, 1982–84)
- Pleasureheads: (1 session, 1989)
- Plone: (2 sessions, 1998–99)
- Plummet Airlines: (2 sessions, 1976–77)
- Pluto Monkey: (1 session, 2000)
- Po!: (1 session, 1994)
- Pogues: (2 sessions, 1984)
- Police: (1 session, 1979)
- Policecat: (1 session, 1997)
- Polvo: (2 sessions, 1992–93)
- Polysics: (1 session, 2004)
- Polythene: (1 session, 1998)
- Pond: (2 sessions, 1992–95)
- Ponderosa Glee Boys: (1 session, 1981)
- Pooh Sticks: (2 sessions, 1988–89)
- The Pop Group: (1 session, 1978)
- The Popguns: (2 sessions, 1990)
- Pop Rivets: (1 session, 1980)
- Pop Will Eat Itself: (2 sessions, 1986–87)
- Mal Pope: (3 sessions, 1973–74)
- Popinjays: (1 session, 1988)
- Poppi UK: (1 session, 1988)
- Popticians: 2 sessions (1983–84)
- A Popular History of Signs: (1 session, 1983)
- Popular Voice: (1 session, 1982)
- Portal: (1 session, 2000)
- Portion Control: (1 session, 1984)
- Positive Noise: (2 sessions, 1980–81)
- Postmen: (1 session, 1980)
- Cozy Powell: (1 session, 1974)
- Duffy Power: (1 session, 1973)
- PragVEC: (3 sessions, 1978–79)
- Pram: (3 sessions, 1999–2003)
- The Prats: (1 session, 1979)
- Prefab Sprout: (1 session, 1985)
- The Prefects: (2 sessions, 1978–79)
- Premi: (1 session, 1987)
- Sid Presley Experience: (1 session, 1984)
- Preston School of Industry: (1 session, 2001)
- Pretty Girls Make Graves: (1 session, 2003)
- The Pretty Things: (9 sessions, 1967–75)
- Prewar Yardsale: (1 session, 2003)
- Maxi Priest: (1 session, 1985)
- Primal Scream: (2 sessions, 1985–86)
- Primevals: (1 session, 1985)
- The Primitives: (3 sessions, 1986–88)
- Prince Far I and Creation Rebel: (1 session, 1978)
- Principal Edward's Magic Theatre: (5 sessions, 1968–73)
- John Prine: (1 session, 1973)
- Maddy Prior & June Tabor: (1 session, 1975)
- Procol Harum: (2 session, 1967–74)
- Professionals: (1 session, 1980)
- Prolapse: (2 sessions, 1994–97)
- Prong: (1 session, 1989)
- Propellerheads: (1 session, 1996)
- Prophecy of Doom: (2 sessions, 1990–91)
- Prophets of Da City: (1 session, 1995)
- Protex: (1 session, 1979)
- Psychedelic Furs: (3 sessions, 1979–81)
- Psychick Warriors Ov Gaia: (1 session, 1994)
- Psylons: (1 session, 1986)
- Pulp: (4 sessions, 1981–2001)
- Punishment of Luxury: (2 sessions, 1978–79)
- Pure Morning: (3 sessions, 1994–96)
- James & Bobby Purify: (1 session, 1967)
- Purple Hearts: (1 session, 1979)
- Pushkins: (1 session, 1993)
- Pussy Crush: (2 sessions, 1994–96)
- Pussy Galore: (1 session, 1990)
- Pussycat Trash: (1 session, 1993)

== Q ==
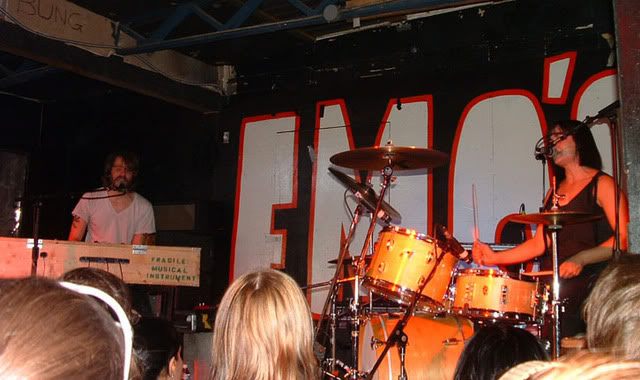
Quasi recorded three sessions between 1998 and 2001.

- Quads: (1 session, 1979)
- Quando Quango: (1 session, 1983)
- Quasi: (4 sessions, 1999–2001)
- Quatermass: (1 session, 1970)
- Que Bono: (1 session, 1981)
- Queen: (3 sessions, 1973–77)
- Quickspace: (4 sessions, 1995–99)
- Quiver: (3 sessions, 1971–72)

== R ==
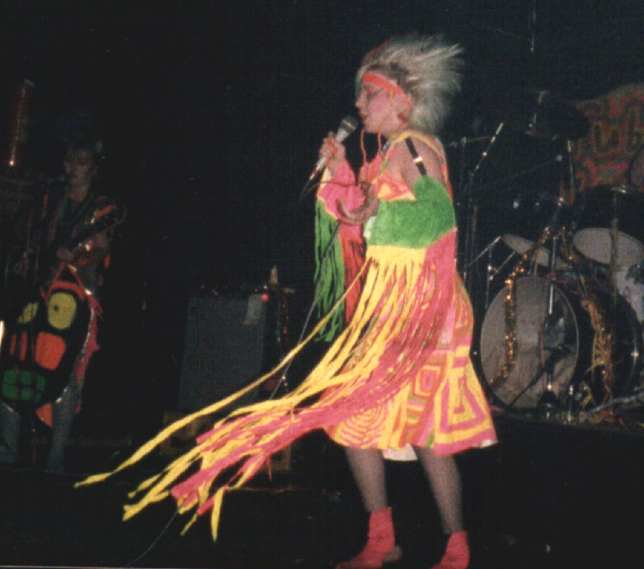
Rubella Ballet recorded two sessions in 1982 and 1983.

- Rachels: (1 session, 1997)
- Racing Cars: (5 sessions, 1976–78)
- Radar Brothers: (3 sessions, 1996–2000)
- Radial Spangle: (1 session, 1993)
- Radio 5: (1 session, 1980)
- Radio Stars: (3 sessions, 1977–78)
- Radio Sweethearts: (1 session, 2000)
- Gerry Rafferty: (1 session, 1973)
- Ragga Twins: (2 sessions, 1991–92)
- Railway Children: (1 session, 1986)
- Raincoats: (3 sessions, 1979–94)
- Ravishing Beauties: (1 session, 1982)
- Raw Noise: (1 session, 1991)
- Lou Rawls, Maxine Brown and The Johnny Watson Concept: (1 session, 1967)
- Read Yellow: (1 session, 2004)
- Rebel Da Fe: (1 session, 1983)
- Rechenzentrum: (1 session, 2001)
- Red Beards from Texas: (1 session, 1985)
- Red Beat: (1 session, 1980)
- Red Guitars: (2 sessions, 1983–84)
- Red Hour: (1 session, 1991)
- Red Letter Day: (1 session, 1986)
- Red Lorry Yellow Lorry: (2 sessions, 1982–83)
- Red Monkey: (1 session, 1998)
- Red Ninja: (1 session, 1991)
- The Redskins: (2 sessions, 1982–83)
- Reggae Regular: (2 sessions, 1978)
- Reginald: (1 session, 1971)
- Regis: (1 session, 1998)
- Terry Reid: (1 session, 1969)
- The Relations: (1 session, 1986)
- R.E.M.: (1 session, 1998)
- Remipeds: (1 session, 1981)
- Renaissance: (1 session, 1969)
- John Renbourn and Jackie McShee: (1 session, 1968)
- John Renbourn and Terry Cox: (1 session, 1968)
- Renegade Soundwave: (1 session, 1987)
- Repetition: (1 session, 1981)
- Resistance: (2 sessions, 1979–81)
- Restricted Code: (1 session, 1981)
- Revillos: (2 sessions, 1980–81)
- Reviver Gene: (2 sessions, 1999–2000)
- Revolver: (1 session, 1991)
- Reynolds: (1 session, 2002)
- Rezillos: (2 sessions, 1977–78)
- Steve Rhodes Singers: (1 session, 1973)
- Emitt Rhodes: (1 session, 1971)
- Rhythm Eternity: (1 session, 1992)
- Rhythm Pigs: (1 session, 1987)
- Rich Kids: (2 sessions, 1977–78)
- Ride: (2 sessions, 1990)
- Joshua Rifkin: (1 session, 1973)
- Marc Riley and the Creepers: (5 sessions, 1983–87)
- Riot of Colour: (1 session, 1986)
- Rip Rig + Panic: (2 sessions, 1981–82)
- Ripcord: (1 session, 1988)
- Ritual: (1 session, 1981)
- Riviera: (1 session, 2001)
- Andy Roberts and Adrian Henri: (4 sessions, 1968–72)
- Tom Robinson Band: (2 sessions, 1977–79)
- R.O.C.: (1 session, 1995)
- Rock of Travolta: (1 session, 2001)
- Rocks: (1 session, 1978)
- Rodan: (1 session, 1994)
- Jess Roden: (4 sessions, 1974–76)
- Phillip Roebuck: (1 session, 2004)
- Rogers Sisters: (1 session, 2003)
- Rollerskate Skinny: (1 session, 1993)
- Roman Holliday: (2 sessions, 1982–83)
- Rome: (1 session, 1997)
- Ronnie Ronalde: (1 session, 2002)
- Roogalator: (3 sessions, 1976–77)
- Room: (5 sessions, 1981–85)
- Room 101: (1 session, 1983)
- Rooney: (1 session, 1999)
- Röövel Ööbik: (1 session, 1993)
- Rose of Avalanche: (1 session, 1985)
- Jack Rose: (1 session, 2004)
- Jack Rose, Glenn Jones and Simon Joyner: (1 session, 2004)
- Tim Rose: (5 sessions, 1967–68)
- Rote Kapelle: (1 session, 1986)
- Rothko: (1 session, 2000)
- Roxy Music: (5 sessions, 1972–73)
- Royal Trux: (2 sessions, 1993)
- Rubella Ballet: (2 sessions, 1982–83)
- Rudi: (1 session, 1981)
- Rudies: (1 session, 1970)
- Rugrat: (1 session, 1994)
- Rumble: (1 session, 1996)
- Rumour: (1 session, 1977)
- Tom Rush: (1 session, 1968)
- James Ruskin & The Drop: (1 session, 1998)
- Russians: (1 session, 1979)
- Ruthless Rap Assassins: (1 session, 1989)
- Ruts: (4 sessions, 1979–81)

== S ==
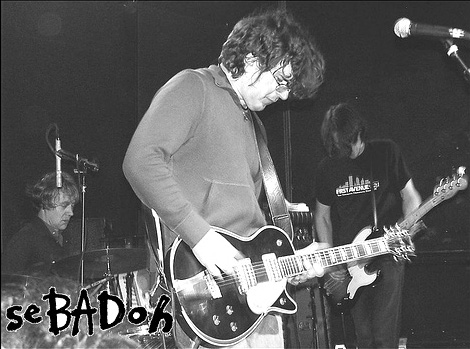
Sebadoh recorded three sessions between 1992 and 1994.

- Sabres of Paradise: (1 session, 1995)
- Sad Lovers & Giants: (1 session, 1981)
- Bridget St John: (10 sessions, 1968–76)
- St Johnny: (1 session, 1993)
- Salako: (1 session, 1998)
- Salaryman: (1 session, 1997)
- Sallyangie: (1 session, 1968)
- Saloon: (3 sessions, 2001–03)
- Salt Tank: (1 session, 1994)
- Sammy: (1 session, 1994)
- The Samurai Seven: (5 sessions, 1998–2002)
- Sandmen: (1 session, 1993)
- Bob Sargeant: (6 sessions, 1973–77)
- Peter Sarstedt: (1 session, 1968)
- Sassafras: (2 sessions, 1973–74)
- Paul Savage and John Hewitt: (1 session, 1971)
- Savage Progress: (1 session, 1984)
- Savoy Brown Blues Band: (3 sessions, 1968–70)
- Leo Sayer: (1 session, 1973)
- Scaffold: (1 session, 1968)
- Scala Timpani: (1 session, 1985)
- Scarfo: (2 sessions, 1996–98)
- Scars: (2 sessions, 1980–81)
- Schlaflose Nachte: (1 session, 1981)
- Schneider TM: (1 session, 2003)
- Scientist: (1 session, 1991)
- Scorn: (2 sessions, 1992–94)
- Scott Brown (DJ) (1 session, 1996)
- Scotch Egg: (1 session, 2004)
- Robin Scott: (1 session, 1969)
- Scratch Perverts: (2 sessions, 1999)
- Scrawl: (1 session, 1993)
- Scream and Dance: (2 sessions, 1982–83)
- Screaming Blue Messiahs: (1 session, 1984)
- Screen 3: (2 sessions, 1983)
- Scritti Politti: (3 sessions, 1978–82)
- The Sea Nymphs: (1 session, 1998)
- Seaweed: (1 session, 1992)
- Sebadoh: (3 sessions, 1992–94)
- Sebastian's Men: (1 session, 1984)
- Márta Sebestyén: (1 session, 1988)
- Secret Affair: (2 sessions, 1979)
- Secret Goldfish: (2 sessions, 1997–99)
- Secret Hairdresser: (1 session, 2004)
- Section 25: (1 session, 1981)
- Seedling: (3 sessions, 2001–03)
- Seefeel: (1 session, 1994)
- Peggy Seeger: (1 session, 1969)
- Selecter: (2 sessions, 1979–80)
- Send No Flowers: (1 session, 1982)
- Sender Berlin: (1 session, 2000)
- Senseless Prayer: (1 session, 1999)
- Senseless Things: (3 sessions, 1988–93)
- Senser: (2 sessions, 1993–94)
- Sensible Jerseys: (1 session, 1985)
- Serious Drinking: (4 sessions, 1982–83)
- Servants: (1 session, 1986)
- Servotron: (1 session, 1997)
- Sewing Room: (1 session, 1996)
- Sex Clark Five: (4 sessions, 1990–2002)
- Sex Gang Children: (1 session, 1982)
- Shadows: (1 session, 1973)
- Shadowy Men on a Shadowy Planet: (1 session, 1993)
- Shake: (1 session, 1979)
- Shalawambe: (1 session, 1988)
- Sham 69: (1 session, 1977)
- Shamen: (4 sessions, 1986–91)
- Shanghai: (1 session, 1976)
- Sharkey: (1 session, 2003)
- Sharon Shannon: (1 session, 1994)
- Shapes: (1 session, 1979)
- Sandie Shaw: (1 session, 1988)
- Shellac: (2 sessions, 1994–2004)
- Shesus: (1 session, 2003)
- Shillelagh Sisters: (1 session, 1984)
- Johnny Shines: (1 session, 1970)
- Shitmat: (2 sessions, 2004)
- Shoes For Industry: (1 session, 1979)
- Shonen Knife: (2 sessions, 1991–92)
- Shoot: (1 session, 1972)
- Shoot! Dispute: (2 sessions, 1984)
- Shop Assistants: (2 sessions, 1985–86)
- Short Commercial Break: (1 session, 1982)
- Shriek: (1 session, 1994)
- Shriekback: (3 sessions, 1982–85)
- The Shrubs: (2 sessions, 1986–87)
- Shut Up and Dance: (2 sessions, 1990–92)
- Siddeleys: (2 sessions, 1988–89)
- Sights: (1 session, 1996)
- Signorinas: (1 session, 1981)
- Sigur Rós: (1 session, 2000)
- Silicone: (1 session, 1998)
- Silverfish: (3 sessions, 1989–92)
- Simba Wanyika: (1 session, 1990)
- Simple Minds: (2 sessions, 1979–82)
- Martin Simpson: (1 session, 1977)
- Sinatras: (1 session, 1981)
- Sink: (3 sessions, 1987–90)
- Siouxsie & the Banshees: (5 sessions, 1977–86)
- Sisters of Mercy: (2 sessions, 1982–84)
- Six By Seven: (5 sessions, 1998–2004)
- Roni Size & Reprazent: (1 session, 1996)
- Skat: (1 session, 1982)
- Skeletal Family: (2 sessions, 1983–84)
- Ski Patrol: (1 session, 1981)
- Skid Row: (2 sessions, 1970–71)
- Skids: (5 sessions, 1978–80)
- Skiff Skats: 2 sessions (1984–85)
- Skimmer: (1 session, 2004)
- Skin Alley: (1 session, 1969)
- Skink: (1 session, 1992)
- Skinned Teen: (1 session, 1993)
- Skip Bifferty: (3 sessions, 1967–68)
- Skodas: (1 session, 1981)
- Skrewdriver: (1 session, 1977)
- Patrick Sky: (2 sessions, 1969)
- Skynet: (1 session, 2003)
- Skyscraper: (1 session, 1993)
- Slab!: (3 sessions, 1986–88)
- Slade: (1 session, 1972)
- Slapp Happy: (1 session, 1974)
- Luke Slater: (2 sessions, 1994–2000)
- Sleeper: (3 sessions, 1994–96)
- Slits: (3 sessions, 1977–81)
- Slowdive: (1 session, 1991)
- Slowjam: (1 session, 1991)
- Sloy: (1 session, 1995)
- Sluts of Trust: (1 session, 2004)
- Small Faces: (1 session, 1968)
- Small Factory: (1 session, 1992)
- Smaller: (1 session, 1995)
- Smashing Orange: (1 session, 1991)
- Smashing Pumpkins: (1 session, 1991)
- Smiggs Band: (1 session, 1976)
- Smirks: (1 session, 1978)
- Gordon Smith: (2 sessions, 1968–69)
- Michael Smith: (1 session, 1982)
- TV Smith's Cheap: (1 session, 1988)
- Smog: (3 sessions, 1994–2001)
- Smudge: (1 session, 1994)
- Snafu: (1 session, 1975)
- The Snapdragons: (1 session, 1989)
- Snuff: (1 session, 1989)
- So You Think You're a Cowboy?: (1 session, 1983)
- S.O.B.: (1 session, 1990)
- Sodastream: (1 session, 2000)
- Sofa Head: (1 session, 1989)
- Soft Machine: (9 sessions, 1967–73)
- Mick Softley: (2 sessions, 1972–73)
- Solar Race: (2 sessions, 1995–96)
- Soledad Brothers: (3 sessions, 2002–04)
- Solex: (5 sessions, 1998–2002)
- Son House: (1 session, 1970)
- Sonic Youth: (3 sessions, 1986–89)
- Sons of the Subway: (1 session, 1994)
- Sophisticated Boom Boom: (3 sessions, 1981–83)
- Soul Bossa: (2 sessions, 1995–96)
- Soul Sisters and The Clockwork Orange: (1 session, 1967)
- Sound: (1 session, 1981)
- Soundgarden: (1 session, 1989)
- Soundman: (1 session, 1997)
- Sounds of Life: (1 session, 1995)
- Soup Dragons: (2 sessions, 1986)
- Source Direct: (1 session, 1997)
- Tim Souster: (1 session, 1969)
- Southern Comfort: (2 sessions, 1971–72)
- Southern Death Cult: (1 session, 1982)
- Otis Spann: (1 session, 1969)
- Spare Rib: (1 session, 1973)
- Spare Snare: 3 sessions (1995–2001)
- Roger Ruskin Spear and His Giant Orchestral Wardrobe: (1 session, 1971)
- Spear of Destiny: (1 session, 1982)
- Specials: (4 sessions, 1979–83)
- Chris Spedding: (2 session, 1972–77)
- Speeder: (1 session, 2000)
- Jon Spencer Blues Explosion: (1 session, 1993)
- Spike: (1 session, 1994)
- Spiritualized: (2 sessions, 1992–95)
- Spitfire: (1 session, 1991)
- Spizzoil: (1 session, 1978)
- Spizz Energi: (3 sessions, 1979–80)
- SPK: (1 session, 1983)
- Splintered: (2 sessions, 1992–95)
- Split Enz: (1 session, 1978)
- Splodgenessabounds: (1 session, 1980)
- Spooky Tooth: (4 sessions, 1968)
- Sportique: (3 sessions, 1998–2001)
- Spraydog: (2 sessions, 1998–2000)
- Squeeze: (2 sessions, 1977–78)
- Stackridge: (7 sessions, 1971–76)
- Stackwaddy: (1 session, 1972)
- Stakka & Skynet: (1 session, 2001)
- Vivian Stanshall: (12 sessions, 1970–91)
- Stanton: (1 session, 2002)
- Starry Eyed and Laughing: (3 sessions, 1974–75)
- Stars of Heaven: (4 sessions, 1986–88)
- Status Quo: (3 sessions, 1972–73)
- Stealers Wheel: (5 sessions, 1972–75)
- Steam Hammer: (1 session, 1969)
- Steel Pulse: (5 sessions, 1977–82)
- Steeleye Span: (10 sessions, 1970–74)
- Stereo MCs: (1 session, 1990)
- Stereolab: (6 sessions, 1991–2001)
- Steve Elgin & The Flatbackers: (1 session, 1979)
- Steveless: (2 sessions, 2004)
- Cat Stevens: (1 session, 1967)
- Jimmy Stevens: (2 sessions, 1972–73)
- John Stevens: (1 session, 1976)
- Al Stewart: 7 sessions, 1968–74)
- Stiff Little Fingers: (5 sessions, 1978–81)
- Stiffs: (2 sessions, 1980–82)
- Stimulin: (1 session, 1981)
- Stoat: (1 session, 1978)
- Stone the Crows: (4 sessions, 1969–72)
- Stoneground: (1 session, 1971)
- Stony Sleep: (2 sessions, 1997–98)
- STP 23: (1 session, 1990)
- Straitjacket Fits: (1 session, 1989)
- Strangelove: (2 sessions, 1992–93)
- Stranglers: (2 sessions, 1977)
- Strawberry Switchblade: (2 sessions, 1982–85)
- Strawbs: (3 sessions, 1969–70)
- Stray: (3 sessions, 1972–74)
- Stretch: (3 sessions, 1975–76)
- Stretchheads: (1 session, 1991)
- String Driven Thing: (5 sessions, 1972–76)
- Strip Kings: (1 session, 1995)
- The Strokes: (1 session, 2001)
- Mike Stuart Span: (1 session, 1968)
- Stud: (2 sessions, 1971–72)
- Stuffy & The Fuses: (1 session, 2005)
- Stukas: (1 session, 1978)
- Stump: (4 sessions, 1986–88)
- Stupids: (4 sessions, 1986–88)
- Darren Styles: (1 session, 2004)
- Submarine: (2 sessions, 1993–94)
- Subsonic 2: (1 session, 1991)
- Suburban Studs: (1 session, 1977)
- Subway Sect: ( 2 sessions, 1977–78)
- Suckle: (2 sessions, 1997–2000)
- Sudden Sway: (2 sessions, 1983–84)
- Sugarcubes: (1 session, 1987)
- The Sultans of Ping FC: (1 session, 1992)
- Sun Carriage: (1 session, 1991)
- Suncharms: (1 session, 1992)
- The Sundays: (1 session, 1989)
- Sunn O))): (1 session, 2004)
- Super Furry Animals: (5 sessions, 1996–2004)
- Supercharge: (3 sessions, 1975–77)
- Superchunk: (2 sessions, 1992–93)
- Supergrass: (2 sessions, 1995–99)
- Superqueens: (1 session, 2004)
- Supersister: (1 session, 1973)
- Supertramp: (6 sessions, 1970–74)
- Supreme Dicks: (1 session, 1995)
- Surgeon: (2 sessions, 1998–2000)
- Surgery: (1 session, 1991)
- SUS: (1 session, 1983)
- Sutherland Brothers Band: (1 session, 1972)
- Sutherland Brothers And Quiver: (6 sessions, 1973–75)
- Swan Arcade: (3 sessions, 1973–74)
- Sweet Marriage: (1 session, 1969)
- Swell: (1 session, 1992)
- Swell Maps: (3 sessions, 1978–80)
- Swervedriver: (1 session, 1990)
- Swinging Laurels: (1 session, 1982)
- Swirlies: (1 session, 1994)
- Symbiosis: (1 session, 1971)
- Syncbeat: (1 session, 1984)
- Systems: (1 session, 1981)

== T ==
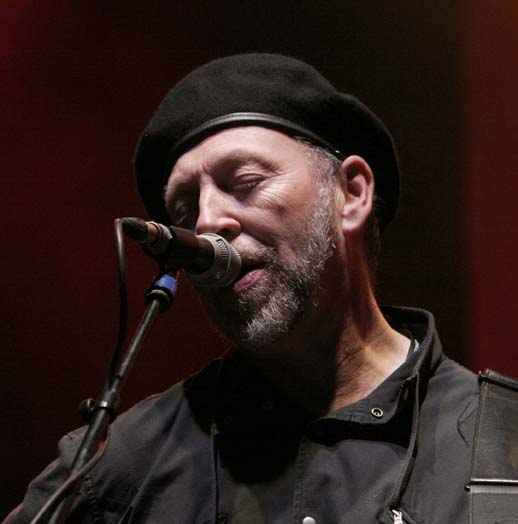
Richard and Linda Thompson recorded three sessions between 1973 and 1975.

- T. Raumschmiere: (1 session, 2003)
- June Tabor: (6 sessions, 1975–91)
- Tad: (2 sessions, 1990)
- Taggett: (1 session, 1973)
- Talisker: (1 session, 1976)
- Talisman: (1 session, 1981)
- Talulah Gosh: (1 session, 1988)
- Tam Linn: (1 session, 1975)
- Sharon Tandy & The Fleur De Lys: (1 session, 1967)
- Tangerine Dream: (2 sessions, 1974)
- Tanz Dar Youth: (1 session, 1978)
- Tar: (1 session, 1991)
- Tarwater: (2 sessions, 1999–2003)
- Taste: (2 sessions, 1968–69)
- James Taylor Quartet: (1 session, 1987)
- Tea Set: (1 session, 1980)
- Teardrop Explodes: (3 sessions, 1979–81)
- Tearjerkers: (2 sessions, 1979–80)
- Tears For Fears: (1 session, 1982)
- Technical Itch: (1 session, 2002)
- Techno Animal: (1 session, 1998)
- Teenage Fanclub: (2 sessions, 1990)
- Teenagers In Trouble: (1 session, 1994)
- Telescopes: (2 sessions, 1989–91)
- Television Personalities: (1 session, 1980)
- Ten Benson: (2 sessions, 1998–2000)
- Ten Years After: (5 sessions, 1967–69)
- Tender Lugers: (1 session, 1986)
- Terminal Cheesecake: (1 session, 1990)
- Terminal Hoedown: (1 session, 1991)
- Terrashima: (2 sessions, 2002)
- Sonny Terry & Brownie McGhee: (1 session, 1973)
- Terry and Gerry: (3 sessions, 1984–85)
- Test Department: (2 sessions, 1983–85)
- Testcard F: (1 session, 1982)
- Les Tetes Brulees: (1 session, 1990)
- That Dog: (1 session, 1994)
- That Petrol Emotion: (3 sessions, 1985–87)
- Theatre of Hate: (3 sessions, 1980–82)
- Thee Hypnotics: (1 session, 1989)
- Themselves: (1 session, 2002)
- The Thing: (1 session, 1991)
- The Smiths (4 sessions, 1983-86)
- Therapy?: (2 sessions, 1991–93)
- Thermals: (1 session, 2003)
- Thievery Corporation: (1 session, 1998)
- Thin Lizzy: (11 sessions, 1972–77)
- Thinking Fellers Union Local 282: (1 session, 1994)
- Third Ear Band: (4 sessions, 1969–72)
- Third Eye Foundation: (1 session, 1999)
- This Heat: (2 sessions, 1977)
- This Poison: (2 sessions, 1987)
- Richard & Linda Thompson: (3 sessions, 1973–75)
- Three Johns: (6 sessions, 1982–87)
- Three Mustaphas Three: (7 sessions, 1983–90)
- Three Stages of Pain: (1 session, 2003)
- Three Wise Men: (1 session, 1986)
- Thrilled Skinny: (1 session, 1988)
- Thrush Puppies: (1 session, 1995)
- Tiger: (2 sessions, 1996–98)
- Tigerstyle: (1 session, 2003)
- Steve Tilson: (1 session, 1971)
- Timeshard: (1 session, 1994)
- Tindersticks: (3 sessions, 1993–96)
- Keith Tippett: (2 sessions, 1970–72)
- Tír na nÓg: (4 sessions, 1972–73)
- To Rococo Rot: (2 sessions, 1997–99)
- Tocques (formerly Buick6, then Friends of the Stars): (1 session, 2002)
- Today Is The Day: (1 session, 1995)
- Tomorrow: (2 sessions, 1967–68)
- Tompaulin: (2 sessions, 2000–01)
- Too Much Texas: (1 session, 1988)
- Tools You Can Trust: (3 sessions, 1983–84)
- Top: (1 session, 1991)
- Topper: (2 sessions, 1997–98)
- Tortoise: (2 sessions, 1996–98)
- Tot: (1 session, 1987)
- Die Toten Hosen: (1 session, 1984)
- Toxic Reasons: (1 session, 1986)
- Tractors: (1 session, 1987)
- Traffic: (4 sessions, 1967–68)
- Tram: (3 sessions, 1998–2001)
- Trans Am: (1 session, 2000)
- Transglobal Underground: (2 sessions, 1993–95)
- Transmitters: (2 sessions, 1979–81)
- Travis Cut: (3 sessions, 1998–2002)
- Treebound Story: (1 session, 1986)
- Trembling Blue Stars: (1 session, 2000)
- Trencher: (2 sessions, 2004)
- Tribute To Nothing: (1 session, 1994)
- Triffids: (3 sessions, 1984–86)
- Tripping Daisy: (1 session, 1996)
- Trixie's Big Red Motor Bike: (2 sessions, 1982–83)
- Robin Trower: (3 sessions, 1973–75)
- Trumans Water: (3 sessions, 1993–94)
- Trusty: (1 session, 1996)
- Tsunami: (1 session, 1993)
- Tubeway Army: (1 session, 1979) (see also Gary Numan)
- Moe Tucker: (1 session, 1992)
- Chris Stainton's Tundra: (1 session, 1974)
- Tunic: (4 sessions, 1995–97)
- Tunnel Frenzies: (1 session, 1989)
- Turbocat: (1 session, 1998)
- TV Smith's Explorers: (1 session, 1981)
- TV21: (2 sessions, 1980–81)
- Twa Toots: (1 session, 1983)
- Twang: (3 sessions, 1986–88)
- Twinkie: (1 session, 2003)
- Twinkle Brothers: (1 session, 1981)
- Twinset: (3 sessions, 1982–83)
- Twist: (1 session, 1999)
- Twisted Nerve: (1 session, 1981)
- TWP: (1 session, 1998)
- Tyla Gang: (3 sessions, 1977–78)
- Tyrannosaurus Rex: (8 sessions, 1967–70)
- Tystion: (2 sessions, 2000–01)

== U ==
- UB40: (2 sessions, 1979–1982)
- UFO: (1 session, 1977)
- Ugly Music Show: (1 session, 1991)
- Ui: (1 session, 2000)
- UK Decay: (2 sessions, 1980–81)
- UK Subs: (3 sessions, 1978–79)
- Ukrainians: (2 sessions, 1991–92)
- Ultramarine: (2 sessions, 1992–94)
- Ultraviolence: (1 session, 1992)
- Ultravox: (1 session, 1977)
- Uncle Dog: (3 sessions, 1972)
- The Undertones: (7 sessions, 1978–2003)
- Underworld: (2 sessions, 2003–04)
- Unfinished Sympathy: (2 sessions, 2001–04)
- Unicorn: (1 session, 1974)
- Union Kid: (2 sessions, 1999–2001)
- Unrest: (1 session, 1992)
- Unsane: (3 sessions, 1991–94)
- Unseen Terror: (1 session, 1988)
- Unwound: (1 session, 1998)
- Upp: (1 session, 1974)
- Urusei Yatsura: (3 sessions, 1995–97)
- US Maple: (1 session, 1996)
- Ut: (2 sessions, 1984–1988)
- Uzeda: (2 sessions, 1994)

== V ==
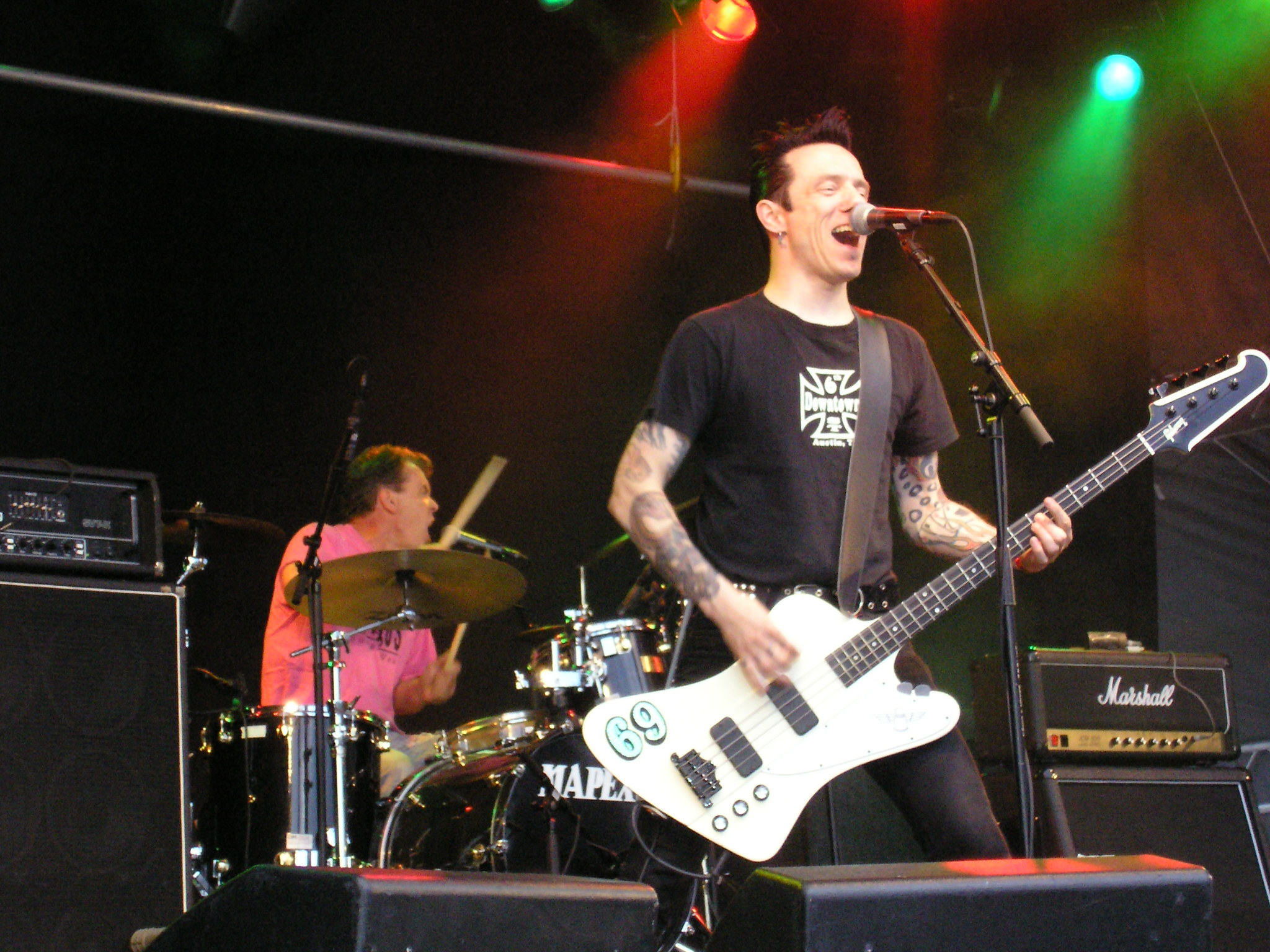
The Vibrators recorded three sessions between 1976 and 1978.

- Van Basten: (2 sessions, 1995–96)
- Van Der Graaf Generator: (8 sessions, 1968–77)
- Marina Van-Roy: (1 session, 1992)
- The Vapors: (1 session, 1979)
- The Vaults: (4 sessions, 2002–04)
- Champion Doug Vetch: (2 sessions, 1984–86)
- Velocette: (1 session, 1997)
- Velocity Girl: (1 session, 1993)
- Velodrome 2000: (1 session, 1998)
- Elmer Gantry's Velvet Opera: (2 sessions, 1967–68)
- Verve: (1 session, 1992)
- Very Things: (2 sessions, 1984–87)
- Vibes: (1 session, 1985)
- The Vibrators: (3 sessions, 1976–78)
- Vice Squad: (2 sessions, 1981–82)
- Victim's Family: (1 session, 1989)
- Gene Vincent: (1 session, 1971)
- Vinegar Joe: (2 sessions, 1972)
- The Vipers: (1 session, 1979)
- Virgin Dance: (1 session, 1983)
- Virginia Doesn't: (1 session, 1979)
- Visions of Change: (1 session, 1987)
- Visitors: (3 sessions, 1980–82)
- Vital Excursions: (1 session, 1982)
- Vitalic: (1 session, 2004)
- Vitus Dance: (1 session, 1979)
- Cristian Vogel: (2 sessions, 1995–98)
- Von Bondies: (3 sessions, 2001–04)
- Voodoo Queens: (3 sessions, 1993–94)
- Voorhees: (1 session, 1995)

== W ==
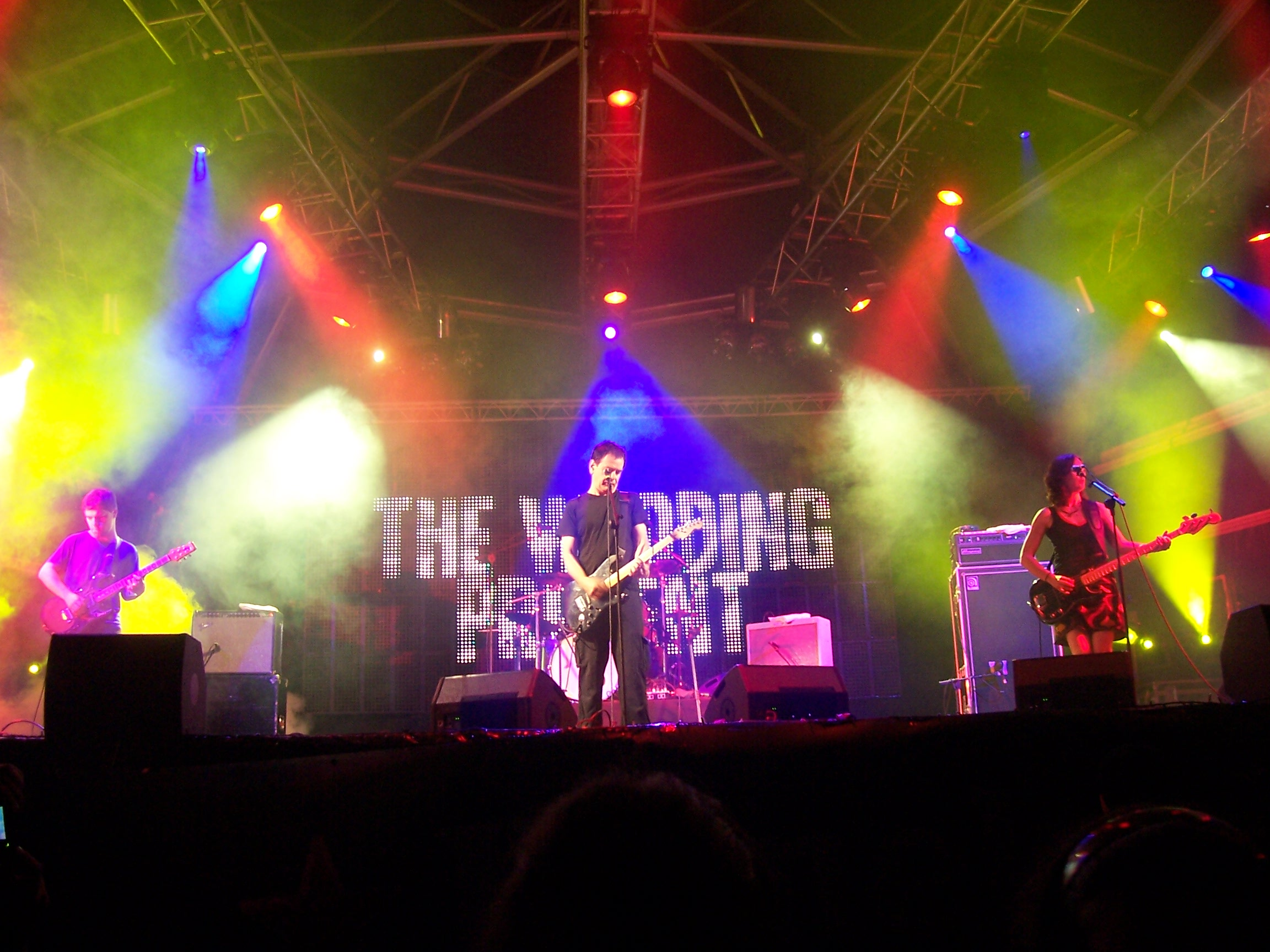
The Wedding Present recorded nine sessions between 1986 and 1992.

- Wagon Christ: (2 sessions, 1998–2001)
- Wah!: (6 sessions, 1980–2000)
- Wailing Cocks: (1 session, 1978)
- Wailing Souls: (1 session, 1984)
- Loudon Wainwright III: (16 sessions, 1971–2003)
- The Wake: (1 session, 1983)
- Walking Seeds: (4 sessions, 1987–90)
- Waltones: (1 session, 1988)
- Clifford T Ward: (2 sessions, 1972–71)
- Robert Ward & The Otis Grand Blues Band: (1 session, 1993)
- Wasps: (2 sessions, 1978–79)
- Wauvenfold: (1 session, 2001)
- Weather Prophets: (1 session, 1986)
- The Wedding Present: (13 sessions, 1986–2004)
- Ween: (2 sessions, 1992–93)
- Welfare State: (1 session, 1970)
- Seething Wells: (1 session, 1982)
- Papa Wemba: (2 sessions, 1992–95)
- Werefrogs: (2 sessions, 1992–93)
- Western Promise: (1 session, 1985)
- We've Got A Fuzzbox And We're Gonna Use It: (2 sessions, 1986)
- What? Noise: (1 session, 1990)
- Wheat: (1 session, 2000)
- Where's the Beach: (3 sessions, 1989–92)
- Whipped Cream: (1 session, 1991)
- Whirlwind: (1 session, 1980)
- Whistler: (1 session, 2000)
- White and Torch: (1 session, 1984)
- White Hassle: (1 session, 1998)
- The White Stripes: (2 sessions, 2001)
- Jack White: (1 session, 2004)
- Whitecats: (2 sessions, 1978)
- Whiteout: (1 session, 1994)
- The Who: (1 session, 1967)
- Widowmaker: (1 session, 1976)
- Wilbur Wilberforce: (2 sessions, 1998–2001)
- Wild Swans: (1 session, 1982)
- Wild Turkey: (3 sessions, 1972–73)
- Wild Weekend: (1 session, 1982)
- John Williams: (1 session, 1969)
- Wilson: (1 session, 1996)
- Wire: (5 sessions, 1978–2002)
- Wisdom of Harry: (1 session, 2000)
- Wishbone Ash: (3 sessions, 1971–77)
- A Witness: (4 sessions, 1986–88)
- Wolf Eyes: (1 session, 2004)
- The Wolfhounds: (3 sessions, 1986–88)
- Wommet: (1 session, 1970)
- Breton Wood: (1 session, 1968)
- Woodbine: (2 sessions, 1998–99)
- The Woodentops: (3 sessions, 1984–86)
- Gay & Terry Woods: (3 sessions, 1970–78)
- Workforce: (2 sessions, 1985–86)
- Workhouse: (2 sessions, 2003–05)
- Working Week: (1 session, 1984)
- World of Twist: (1 session, 1991)
- Would Be's: (1 session, 1990)
- Wreckless Eric: (2 sessions, 1977–78)
- Gary Wrights's Wonderwheel: (2 sessions, 1972)
- Writing on the Wall: (2 sessions, 1968–71)
- Robert Wyatt: (2 sessions, 1972,-74)

== X ==
- X-Men: (1 session, 1984)
- X-Ray Spex: (2 sessions, 1978)
- Xdreamysts: (1 session, 1980)
- Xmal Deutschland: (4 sessions, 1982–85)
- XOL DOG 400: (1 session, 1994)
- XTC: (4 sessions, 1977–79)
- Xymox: (2 sessions, 1984-1985)

== Y ==
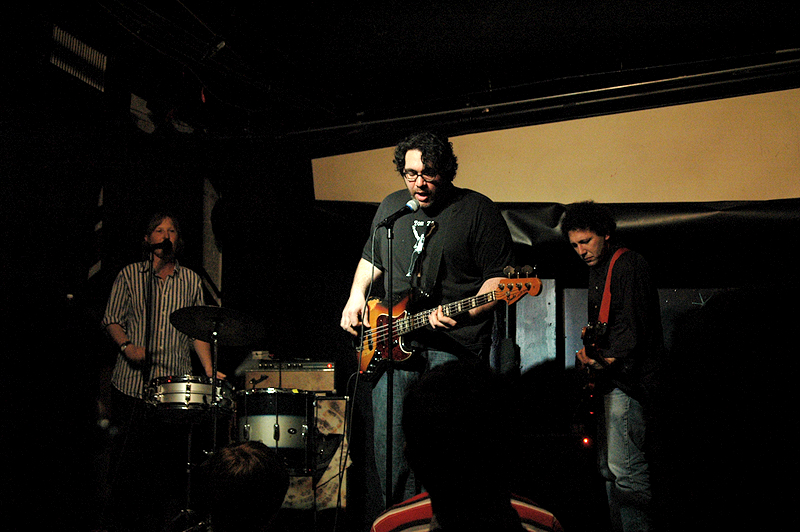
Yo La Tengo recorded three sessions between 1997 and 1999.

- Yachts: (2 sessions, 1978–79)
- Stomu Yamashta: (1 session, 1974)
- Yardbirds: (1 session, 1968)
- Yardstick: (1 session, 1992)
- Yazoo: (1 session, 1982)
- Yeah Yeah Noh: (3 sessions, 1984–86)
- Yeah Yeah Yeahs: (1 session, 2002)
- Yes: (1 session, 1969)
- Yip Yip Coyote: (3 sessions, 1983–84)
- Yo La Tengo: (3 sessions, 1997–99)
- James Yorkston & The Athletes: (1 session, 2002)
- Jessie Young & The Word: (1 session, 1967)
- Roy Young Band: (2 sessions, 1972)
- The Young Gods: (1 session, 1988)
- Young Heart Attack: (1 session, 2003)
- Young Marble Giants: (1 session, 1980)
- Young People: (1 session, 2003)
- Young Tradition: (2 sessions, 1969)
- Yourcodenameis:Milo: (2 sessions, 2003–04)
- You've Got Foetus On Your Breath: (1 session, 1983)
- The Yummy Fur: (2 sessions, 1995–98)

== Z ==
- Zabrinski: (1 session, 2001)
- Zeni Geva: (2 sessions, 1994–96)
- Benjamin Zephaniah: (2 sessions, 1983)
- Zero Zero: (1 session, 1991)
- Zeros: (1 session, 1977)
- Zerra 1: (2 sessions, 1983)
- Zimbabwe Cha Cha Cha Kings: (1 session, 1993)
- Zinica: (1 session, 1987)
- Zion Train: (2 sessions, 1994–96)
- Zones: (2 sessions, 1978)
- Zuvuya: (1 session, 1994)
- Zvuki Mu: (1 session, 1989)
- Die Zwei At The Rodeo: (1 session, 1984)

== Bibliography ==
- Garner, Ken (2007). The Peel Sessions: A Story of Teenage Dreams and One Man's Love of New Music. United Kingdom: BBC Digital. ISBN 978-1846072826.
