= HDQ =

HDQ may refer to:

- HDQ, telegraph code for Hualong South railway station, China
- Hung Drawn Quartet, band of Raymond MacDonald, British saxophonist
- HDQ, ICAO airport code for Aero Feliz, Mexico
- HDQ, abbreviation for Health in Emergencies & Disasters Quarterly, publication of University of Social Welfare and Rehabilitation Sciences, Iran
- HDQ, division code of Hedong, Tianjin, China
- HDQ Neutral, chemical that was the subject of a 2023 class-action lawsuit against GEO Group
