= Peelennium =

The Peelennium was a selection of songs by BBC Radio DJ John Peel from 1900 to 2000 in order to celebrate the last 100 years of music leading up to the millennium. It was carefully timed to play out over the 100 remaining shows of 1999, starting with Thursday 13 May.

== History ==
For the Peelennium John Peel and his producers selected at least four tracks from each year of the last century. Thus stretching from 1900 to the millennium, it was broadcast during the last hundred shows of John Peel's BBC Radio 1 show in 1999.

Peel's musical history knowledge and record collection were used, along with research to find the most interesting tracks from a particular year. BBC Archive and Information and BBC Music Library were involved extensively in finding the necessary tracks and making sure that they actually were original recordings.

The idea of the Peelennium was conceived as a musical way to celebrate the millennium, but also to illustrate how popular musical styles had changed over the century, and shaped the music we listen to today.

The Peelennium began on Thursday 13 May 1999 with the year 1900.

== List of presented records ==
No.	Artist	Title	Composer	Year
1	Louis Bradfield	"I Want To Be A Military Man"	Leslie Stuart/Owen Hall	1900
2	Gus Elen	"If It Wasn't for the 'Ouses in Between"	Edgar Bateman/George Le Brunn	1900
3	Albert Christian	"Soldiers of the Queen"	Leslie Stuart	1900
4	Peter Dawson	"The Miner's Dream of Home"		1900
5	Jack Morrison & The Variety Singers	"Wot Cher! Knocked 'em in the Old Kent Road"	Albert Chevalier	1901
6	The Variety Singers	"Beer, Beer, Glorious Beer" "Ask a P'liceman"	Harry Anderson, Steve Leggett, Will Godwin, A E Durandeau, E W Rogers	1901
7	Parlophone Quartet	"Why Did I Leave My Little Back Room?" "Our Lodger's Such A Nice Young Man"	F Murray/L Barclay	1901
8	Herbert Darnley	"My Next Door Neighbour's Garden"		1901
9	Lionel Monckton	"Under The Deodar"		1902
10	The Florodora Girls	"Tell Me Pretty Maiden"	Boyd-Jones/Rubens	1902
11	Edna Thornton with Orchestra	"Land of Hope and Glory"	Edward Elgar	1902
12	Arthur Collins	"Won't You Come Home Bill Bailey?"	Hughie Cannon	1902
13	Marie Lloyd	"That's How The Little Girl Got On"		1903
14	Hamilton Hill	"A Bird in a Gilded Cage"	Arthur J. Lamb and Harry Von Tilzer	1903
15	Vesta Victoria	"Riding on a Motor Car"		1903
16	Jack Pleasants	"I Shall Sulk"	C. W. Murphy and Dan Lipton	1903
17	Ernie Mayne	"I Can't Do My Bally Bottom Button Up"		1904
18	Isabel Jay	"My Heart's at Your Feet"	Monckton	1904
19	Isabel Jay	"Poor Wand'ring One"	Gilbert and Sullivan	1904
20	Albert Sandler Trio	"Kashmiri Song (Four Indian Love Lyrics)"	Amy Woodford-Finden	1904
21	Winnie Melville	"The Pipes of Pan"	Lionel Monckton	1905
22	Robert Tear	"Cigarette"	Herbert Haines/Charles Taylor	1905
23	Isabel Jay	"You And I"	Monckton	1905
24	George Baker with Orchestra and Male Quartet	"If Those Lips Could Only Speak"	Charles Ridgewell & Will Goodwin	1905
25	Harry Lauder with Orchestra	"Stop Your Tickling Jock"	Harry Lauder	1906
26	Victoria Monks with Orchestra B	"Give My Regards To Leicester Square"	William/Hargreaves	1906
27	Miss Florrie Forde	"Waltz Me Round Again"		1906
28	George Alexander	"I Want What I Want When I Want It"	Victor Herbert	1906
29	Florrie Forde	"I Do Like to Be Beside the Seaside"	John H. Glover-Kind	1907
30	Derek Oldman	"I Know A Lovely Garden"	Lamber/D'Hardelot	1907
31	Gerald Adams & The Variety Singers	"By The Side of the Zuyder Zee"	Bennett Scott/ AJ Mills	1907
32	Eleanor Jones Hudson	"Rose in the Bud"	Dorothy Foster/P J Barrow	1907
33	Grace Cameron	"Adam and Eve"	Klein/Strong/Burnside	1908
34	Maude Raymond	"Goodbye Molly Brown"	Jerome/Madden	1908
35	George M. Cohan	"The Small Town Gal"	Cohan	1908
36	Maude Raymond	"The Dusky Salome"	Jerome/Madden	1908
37	Gertie Miller	"Moonstruck"	Lionel Monckton	1909
38	George Grossmith, Jr.	"Yip-I-Addy-I-Ay"	Flynn/Grossmith/Cobb	1909
39	Phylis Dare	"Bring Me A Rose"	Ambient/Thompson/Wimperis/Monckton/Talbot	1909
40	George H. Chirgwin	"The Jocular Joker"	Coborn	1909
41	Stanley Kirkby and Orchestra	"Don't Go Down The Mine"		1910
42	Columbia Light Opera Company	"Tony From America"	Lionel Monckton, Arthur Wimperis	1910
43	Harry Champion & Orchestra	"Ginger You're Barmy"	Fred Murray	1910
44	Ella Retford	"Molly O'Morgan"	Letters/Godfrey	1910
45	Jack Pleasants	"I'm Shy Mary Ellen, I'm Shy"	Charles Ridgewell, George Stevens	1911
46	Billy Merson	"The Photo of the Girl I Left Behind"	Billy Merson	1911
47	Nora Bayes & Jack Norworth	"Turn Your Light Off Mister Moon Man"	Bayes/Norworth	1911
48	Charles King	"Let Me Stay And Live in Dixieland"	King/Brice	1911
49	Jack Pleasants	"I'm Twenty-One Today"	Alec Kendal	1912
50	Mark Sheridan	"Who Were You With Last Night"	Sheridan/Godfrey	1912
51	Vesta Victoria	"Look What Percy's Picked Up in the Park"	Castling	1912
52	Bert Williams	"My Landlady"	Williams/Mierisch/Brymm	1912
53	Chauncey Olcott	"I Love the Name of Mary"	Richard Oldham/Helen Taylor	1913
54	Harry Lauder	"It's Nicer to Be in Bed"	Harry Lauder	1913
55	Chauncey Olcott	"When Irish Eyes Are Smiling"	Ball/Olcott/Graff	1913
56	Harry Fragson	"Hello! Hello! Who's Your Lady Friend?"	Harry Fragson and words by Worton David and Bert Lee	1913
57	Harrison Latimer	"Are We Downhearted? No!"	Lawrence Wright, Worton David	1914
58	Basil Hallam	"Gilbert The Filbert"	Herman Finck	1914
59	Violet Loraine and Ambrose Thorne and Orchestra	"When We've Wound Up The Watch on the Rhine"	F W Mark, H E Darewsk	1914
60	Clarice Mayne and 'That' (James W Tate)	"I Was A Good Little Girl Till I Met You "	Clifford Harris, James W Tate	1914
61	Jack Normoth and Orchestra	"Kitty The Telephone Girl"	AJ Lawrence/Huntley Trevor/Tom Mellor/Harry Gifford	1915
62	Marie Lloyd	"A Little of What You Fancy Does You Good"	Fred W. Leigh and George Arthurs	1915
63	Vesta Tilley with Ray Wallace & Orchestra	"Jolly Good Luck to the Girl Who Loves A Soldier" "Following in Father's Footsteps" "The Seaside Sultan"	Fred W. Leigh/Kenneth Lyle	1915
64	Debroy Somers Band	"It's A Lovely War" medley: "Here We Are Again" "Sister Susie Sewing Shirts For Soldiers" "Never Mind" "Army of Today's Alright" "We Haven't Seen The Kaiser"	R P Weston/Herman Darewski	1915
65	Walter Jeffries	"Everybody's Crazy on the Foxtrot"	Bennett Scott	1916
66	Al Jolson	"A Broken Doll"	Joseph W Tate/Clifford Harris	1916
67	Jack Pleasants	"Watching The Trains Come In"	Frank Leo	1916
68	Ella Shields	"Burlington Bertie from Bow"	Hargreaves	1916
69	Walter Glynne	"I Passed By Your Window"	May Brahe	1917
70	Josie Collins	"Love Will Find A Way"	Harold Fraser-Simpson/Graham	1917
71	Florrie Forde	"Take Me Back to Dear Old Blighty"	AJ Mills/Fred Godfrey/Bennett Scott	1917
72	The Six Brown Brothers	"Smiles And Chuckles"	Klickmann	1917
73	George Robey, Clara Evelyn	"First Love, Last Love, Best Love"	Nat D Ayer, Clifford Grey	1918
74	Courtland and Jeffries	"Good-bye-ee!"	R. P. Weston, Burt Lee	1918
75	Harry Weldon	"What Do You Want to Make"	Foley	1918
76	Dorothy Ward	"I Want a Girl"	Dillon/Tilzer	1918
77	Mayfair Dance Orchestra	"Omaha"	Horoatio Nicholls, Worton David	1919
78	Master Thomas Criddle	"That Old Fashioned Mother of Mine"	David Nicholls	1919
79	Lilly Morris	"Don't Have Any More Mrs. Moore"	Castling/Walsh	1919
80	Original Dixieland Jass Band	"Tiger Rag"	D J LaRocca	1919
81	Waller Williams & Vaudeville Theatre Orchestra	"I Know Where The Flies Go in Summertime"	Sam Mayo	1920
82	Mayfair Dance Orchestra	"Wyoming Lullaby"	Gene Williams	1920
83	George Formby, Sr.	"Sailing"	Formby	1920
84	Art Hickman's Orchestra	"Avalon"	Composer: Al Jolson, Vincent Rose	1920
85	Richard Crooks	"Arise O Sun"	Lockton/Wood	1921
86	Patrick Waddington	"Night May Have Its Sadness"	Ivor Novello	1921
87	Alfred Lester	"Ours Is A Nice 'ouse Ours Is"	Herbert Rule, Fred Holt	1921
88	Paul Biese Trio	"Canadian Capers"	Chandler/White/Cohen	1921
89	Ernest Hastings	"My Word You Do Look Queer"	R. P. Weston, Bert Lee	1922
90	Al Jolson	"Toot, Toot, Tootsie (Goo' Bye!)"	Gus Kahn, Ernie Erdman, Danny Russo	1922
91	Pianola Roll	"The Sheik of Araby"	Ted Snyder	1922
92	Fred Barnes Baritone With Orchestra	"Sally (The Sunshine of Our Alley)"	W Stanley/A Allen	1922
93	Melville Gideon	"Horsey Keep Your Tail Up"	Melville Gideon	1923
94	Will Fyffe	"I Belong to Glasgow"	Fyffe	1923
95	I V "Bud" Sheppard	"Rose of the Rio Grande"	Warren/Gorman	1923
96	Louis Armstrong with King Oliver	"Dipper Mouth Blues"	Oliver/Armstrong	1923
97	Anne Ziegler & Webster Booth	"The Second Minuet"	Maurice Besly	1924
98	Bert Firman	"Pasadena"	Leslie/Warren	1924
99	Arcadian Serenaders	"Bobbed Haired Bobby"	Ford/Ward	1924
100	Bix Beiderbecke	"Fidgety Feet"	La Rocca/Shields	1924
101	Cyril Norman & Herman Darewski	"When Sergeant Major's on Parade"	Longstaffe	1925
102	Savoy Havana Band	"Ogo-Pogo"	Strong	1925
103	Sir Harry Lauder	"Keep Right on to the End of the Road"	Lauder/Dillion	1925
104	Savoy Orpheans	"Charleston"	Cecil Mack/James P. Johnson	1925
105	Blind Blake	"Come on Boys Lets Do That Messin' Around"	Blind Blake	1926
106	Johnny Hamp's Kentucky Serenaders	"Blackbottom"	De-Sylva/Brown/Henderson	1926
107	Henry Hall And His Gleneagles Hotel Band	"Bird Song at Eventide"	Coates	1926
108	The Happiness Boys	"She Knows Her Onions"	Yellen/Ager/Pollack	1926
109	Louis Armstrong	"Struttin' With Some Bar-B-Q"	Hardin	1927
110	Duke Ellington & His Orchestra	"Black and Tan Fantasy"	Ellington/Miley	1927
111	Nat Shilkret & His Victor Orchestra	"Flapperette"	Greer/L Wright	1927
112	Blind Willie Johnson	"Dark Was the Night, Cold Was the Ground"	Blind Willie Johnson	1927
113	George Metaxa with Carroll Gibbons & his Orchestra	"Sweet Sue, Just You"	Harris/Young	1928
114	Harold Collins & His Orchestra	"Fashionette"	Glogan/King	1928
115	Ukulele Ike AKA Cliff Edwards	"Just Like A Melody Out of the Sky"		1928
116	Blind Willie McTell	"Statesboro Blues"	McTell	1928
117	Peter Dawson	"The Admiral's Broom"	Bevan	1929
118	Ambrose & His Orchestra	"Tip Toe Through The Tulips With Me"	Al Dubin and Joe Burke	1929
119	Stanley Lupino & The Gaiety Theatre Orchestra	"I Lift Up My Finger And I Say Tweet Tweet"	Leslie Sarony	1929
120	King Oliver	"New Orleans Shout"	King Oliver	1929
121	Van Phillips	"I'm in the Market For You"	McCarthy/Hanley	1930
122	Fred Astaire	"Puttin' on the Ritz"	Irving Berlin	1930
123	Jack Payne	"My Baby Just Cares For Me"	Walter Donaldson and Gus Kahn	1930
124	Leslie Sarony with novelty accompaniment	"Bunkey-Doodle-I-Doh"	Sarony	1930
125	Layton & Johnstone	"Oh Donna Clara"	Peterburski/Kennedy/after Beda	1931
126	Al Bowlly with Ray Noble & His Orchestra	"Goodnight Sweetheart"	Ray Noble, Jimmy Campbell and Reg Connelly	1931
127	Bing Crosby	"Just a Gigolo"	Casucci/Caesar	1931
128	Ruth Willis, Blind Willie McTell	"Experience Blues"	Willis	1931
129	Pat O'Malley	"Goopy Geer"	Herman Hupfeld	1932
130	Unknown with Ray Noble	"Try a Little Tenderness"	Jimmy Campbell and Reg Connelly, and Harry M. Woods	1932
131	Ambrose & His Orchestra with Elsie Carlisle	"The Clouds Will Soon Roll By"	Woods/Dixon	1932
132	Charlie Kunz	Kunz Solo Medly - "Lovely To Look At"/"Some Gets in Your Eyes"/"Night & Day"		1932
133	BBC Dance Orchestra	"The Wedding of Mister Mickey Mouse"		1933
134	Frances Langford	"Stormy Weather"	Harold Arlen and Ted Koehler	1933
135	Spike Hughes & His All American Orchestra	"How Come You Do Me Like You Do"	Austin/Bergere	1933
136	Joe Venuti & His Blue Six	"Jazz Me Blues"	Delaney	1933
137	Gid Tanner & His Skillet Lickers	"Hawkin's Rag"		1934
138	Scott Wood & His Orchestra	"I Only Have Eyes for You"	Al Dubin and Harry Warren	1934
139	Chick Webb	"What A Shuffle"	Kirkpatrick	1934
140	Jimmie Lunceford & His Orchestra	"Stratosphere"	Lunceford	1934
141	George Formby	"Fanlight Fanny"	George Formby, Harry Gifford, Fred E. Cliffe	1935
142	Sleepy John Estes	"Stop That Thing"		1935
143	Western Brothers	"We're Frightfully BBC"	Kenneth and George Western	1935
144	Bunny Berigan & His Blue Boys	"Chicken & Waffles"	Berigan	1935
145	Andy Kirk	"Lotta Sax Appeal"	Williams/Williams	1936
146	Leslie Hutchinson	"These Foolish Things"	Eric Maschwitz and Jack Strachey	1936
147	Robert Johnson	"32-20 Blues"	Johnson	1936
148	Carroll Gibbons	"I've Got You Under My Skin"	Cole Porter	1936
149	Bob Wills & His Texas Playboys	"Steel Guitar Stomp"	Wills	1937
150	Frances Langford	"Once in a While"	Edwards/Green	1937
151	Benny Goodman & His Orchestra	"Sing, Sing, Sing"	Prima	1937
152	Robert Johnson	"Hellhound on My Trail"	Johnson	1937
153	Kokomo Arnold	"Goin' Down in Galilee"		1938
154	Tommy Trinder	"I Don't Do Things Like That"	Trinder	1938
155	Andy Kirk	"Twinklin'"	Williams	1938
156	Count Basie	"Panassie Stomp"	Basie	1938
157	Fats Waller & His Rhythm	"Your Feet's Too Big"	Fred Fisher and Ada Benson	1939
158	Cripple Clarence Lofton	"I Don't Know"		1939
159	Chick Henderson with Joe Loss & His Band	"Begin the Beguine"	Cole Porter	1939
160	King George VI	King George VI's Christmas Message		1939
161	Joe Loss & His Band	"The Spitfire Song"	HM King	1940
162	Bukka White	"Special Stream Line"	White	1940
163	Nat Gonella & His New Georgians	"I'm Nobody's Baby"	Davis/Ager/Santly	1940
164	The Ink Spots	"When the Swallows Come Back to Capistrano"	Leon René	1940
165	Al Bowlly & Jimmy Messene	"When That Man Is Dead And Gone"	Berlin	1941
166	Joe Loss & His Band	"'V' Stands For Victory"	Horatio Nicholls	1941
167	Washboard Sam	"She Belongs to the Devil"		1941
168	Jay McShann	"Vine Street Blues"	McShann	1941
169	Ukulele Ike (AKA Cliff Edwards)	"It Had To Be You"/"Paddlin' Madelin' Home"	Woods	1942
170	Billie Holiday vocals; Paul Whiteman & His Orchestra	"Travellin' Light"	Young/Mundy/Mercer	1942
171	The Royal Air Force Dance Orchestra - Sergeant Miller	"Jersey Bounce"	Plater/Bradshaw/Johnson/Wright	1942
172	Harry Roy & His Band, vocals: Renee Lister	"Chattanooga Choo Choo"	Gordon/Warren	1942
173	New Mayfair Dance Orchestra	"Pedro The Fisherman"	Purcell/Parr-Davies	1943
174	Ambrose & His Orchestra, vocals: Anne Shelton	"You'd Be So Nice to Come Home To"	Cole Porter	1943
175	Dinah Washington	"Evil Gal Blues"	Leonard Feather	1943
176	Bing Crosby & The Andrews Sisters	"Pistol Packin' Mama"	Al Dexter	1943
177	Tampa Red	"Lula Mae"		1944
178	Charlie Barnet	"Skyliner"	Dale Bennett	1944
179	Bing Crosby & The Andrews Sisters	"Ac-Cent-Tchu-Ate the Positive"	Johnny Mercer	1944
180	Mills Brothers	"Till Then"	Wood/Seller/Marcus	1944
181	Frank Sinatra	"Nancy (With the Laughing Face)"	Van Heusen/Silvers	1945
182	Big Maceo	"Chicago Breakdown"	Maceo Merryweather	1945
183	Jimmie Lunceford	"Rhythm Is Our Business"	Cahn/Chaplin/Lunceford	1945
184	Coleman Hawkins	"Rifftide"	Hawkins	1945
185	Jack McVea and His Band	"Open the Door, Richard!"	"Words by Dusty Fletcher and John Mason, music by Dusty Fletcher and Don Howell"	1946
186	Lionel Hampton & His Orchestra	"Hamp's Walkin' Boogie"	Hampton	1946
187	Carroll Gibbons, vocals: Rita Williams	"Chickery Chick"	Dee & Lippman	1946
188	Arthur "Big Boy" Crudup	"That's All Right (Mama)"	Crudup	1946
189	Lester Young	"Jumpin' With Symphony"	Young	1947
190	Frank Sinatra	"Try a Little Tenderness"	Jimmy Campbell and Reg Connelly, and Harry M. Woods	1947
191	Nat King Cole Trio	"There I've Said It Again"		1947
192	Wynonie Harris	"Good Rockin' Tonight"	Brown	1947
193	Pee Wee Hunt & His Orchestra	"Twelfth Street Rag"	Bowman	1948
194	Ella Fitzgerald; The Songspinners	"My Happiness"	Bergantine/Peterson	1948
195	Russ Morgan	"So Tired"	Morgan/Stuart	1948
196	Eddie "Cleanhead" Vinson & His Orchestra	"Some Women Do"	Robinson/Vinson	1948
197	Vaughn Monroe	"Riders in the Sky"	Jones	1949
198	Elton Britt with the Skytoppers	"Candy Kisses"	George Morgan	1949
199	Jo Stafford & Gordon MacRae	"'A' - You're Adorable"	Kaye/Wise/Lippman	1949
200	Stick McGhee	"Drinkin' Wine Spo-Dee-O-Dee"	McGhee	1949
201	Phil Harris	"The Thing"	Grean	1950
202	Eve Young	"Silver Dollar"	Hoffman Merril Watts	1950
203	Roy Byrd & His Blues Jumpers (Professor Longhair)	"Baldhead"	Byrd	1950
204	Anton Karas	"Harry Lime Theme"	Karas	1950
205	Winifred Atwell	"Black And White Rag"	George Botsford	1951
206	Tennessee Ernie Ford	"The Shotgun Boogie"	Ford	1951
207	Fats Domino	"Rosemary"		1951
208	Elmore James	"Dust My Broom"	Johnson/James	1951
209	Percy Faith	"Delicado"		1952
210	Muddy Waters	"She's Allright"	Waters	1952
211	Kay Starr	"Wheel of Fortune"	Bennie Benjamin and George David Weiss	1952
212	Rosemary Clooney	"Half as Much"	Curley Williams	1952
213	Earl Bostic	"Sleep"	Liebig	1953
214	The Orioles	"Crying in the Chapel"	Artie Glen	1953
215	Frankie Laine	"Answer Me (Mutterlein)"	Sigman/Winkler/Rauch	1953
216	Art & Dotty Todd	"Broken Wings"	John Jerome and Bernard Grun	1953
217	The Chordettes	"Mr. Sandman"	Pat Ballard	1954
218	Doctor Ross	"Boogie Disease"	Ross	1954
219	The Crew-Cuts	"Sh-boom (Life Could Be A Dream)"	Keyes/Feaster/McRae/Edwards/Feaster	1954
220	The Four Aces	"Three Coins in the Fountain"	Styne/Cahn	1954
221	Chris Barber & His Jazz Band	"Wild Cat Blues"	C Williams	1955
222	The Four Aces	"Love Is a Many-Splendored Thing"	Webster/Fain	1955
223	Bill Haley & His Comets	"Rock-A-Beatin' Boogie"	Bill Haley	1955
224	Elvis Presley	"Baby Let's Play House"	Arthur Gunter	1955
225	Lonnie Donegan	"Lost John"	Donegan	1956
226	Bill Doggett	"Honky Tonk Pt 1 & 2"	Doggett/Shepherd/Scott/Butler	1956
227	Gene Vincent	"Race with the Devil"	Davis/Vincent	1956
228	Little Richard	"Long Tall Sally"	Johnson/Penniman/Blackwell	1956
229	Buddy Holly & The Crickets	"An Empty Cup (And A Broken Date)"	Petty/Orbison	1957
230	The Coasters	"Searchin''"	Jerry Leiber and Mike Stoller	1957
231	Modern Jazz Quartet	"Golden Striker"	Lewis	1957
232	Jerry Lee Lewis	"It All Depends"	Mize	1957
233	Link Wray	"Rumble"	Grant/Ray Sr	1958
234	Jerry Butler	"For Your Precious Love"	Brooks/Brooks/Butler	1958
235	Conway Twitty	"It's Only Make Believe"	Twitty/Nance	1958
236	The Symbols	"Last Rose of Summer"	Weiss/Pope	1958
237	Duane Eddy	"Peter Gunn"		1959
238	Everly Brothers	"Poor Jenny"	B & F Bryant	1959
239	The Flamingos	"I Only Have Eyes for You"	Al Dubin and Harry Warren	1959
240	Sammy Turner	"Lavender Blue"	Daniel/Morey	1959
241	John Lee Hooker	"No Shoes"	Hooker	1960
242	Santo & Johnny	"The Long Walk Home"	Farina/Farina/Farina	1960
243	The Capris	"There's a Moon Out Tonight"	A Gentile/A Striano/J Luccisano	1960
244	Etta James	"At Last"	Mack Gordon and Harry Warren	1960
245	Shep & the Limelights	"Daddy's Home"	James "Shep" Sheppard, Clarence Bassett, Charles Baskerville	1961
246	Roy Orbison	"Running Scared"	Orbison/Melson	1961
247	Dick Dale	"Let's Go Trippin'"	Dale	1961
248	Don and Juan	"What's Your Name"	Claude Johnson	1961
249	Arthur Alexander	"You Better Move On"	Alexander	1961
250	Elvis Presley	"Return To Sender"	Otis Blackwell/Winfield Scott	1962
251	Marvin Gaye	"Stubborn Kind of Fellow"	Marvin Gaye, William "Mickey" Stevenson and George Gordy	1962
252	Cliff Richard & The Shadows	"We Say Yeah"	Bruce Welch, Hank Marvin, and Peter Gormley	1962
253	Del Shannon	"Hats Off to Larry"	Shannon	1962
254	Jimmy Reed	"Too Much"	O Boyd	1963
255	Bern Elliott and the Fenmen	"Money"	Bradford/Gordy	1963
256	The Beatles	"I Saw Her Standing There"	Lennon–McCartney	1963
257	Lonnie Mack	"Memphis"	Chuck Berry	1963
258	Rolling Stones	"Carol"	Chuck Berry	1964
259	The Mighty Avengers	"So Much in Love"	Jagger/Richards	1964
260	The Escorts	"The One To Cry"	Weiss/Schlaks	1964
261	Roy Orbison	"It's Over"	Orbison/Dees	1964
262	Chuck Berry	"No Particular Place to Go"	Berry	1964
263	The Velvelettes	"Needle in a Haystack"	William Stevenson/Norman Whitfield	1964
264	The Shangri-Las	"Remember (Walking in the Sand)"	Shadow Morton	1964
265	The Kingsmen	"Louie Louie"	Richard Berry	1964
266	The Shadows	"The Rise and Fall of Flingel Bunt"	Welch/Marvin/Rostill/Bennett	1964
267	Bob Dylan	"It Takes a Lot to Laugh, It Takes a Train to Cry"	Dylan	1965
268	The Hollies	"Look Through Any Window"	Gouldman/Silverman	1965
269	Otis Redding	"Ole Man Trouble"		1965
270	John Fahey	"Sail Away Ladies"	Fahey	1965
271	Leonard Cohen	"Sisters of Mercy"	Leonard Cohen	1966
272	The Beatles	"And Your Bird Can Sing"	Lennon–McCartney	1966
273	The Misunderstood	"I Can Take You To The Sun"	Hill/Brown	1966
274	Jimi Hendrix	"Red House"	Hendrix	1966
275	Otis Redding	"Try a Little Tenderness"	Jimmy Campbell and Reg Connelly, and Harry M. Woods	1966
276	Country Joe & The Fish	"Pat's Song"	McDonald	1967
277	The Beatles	"I Am the Walrus"	Lennon–McCartney	1967
278	The Who	"I Can See for Miles"	Pete Townshend	1967
279	Rolling Stones	"She's a Rainbow"	Jagger/Richard	1967
280	Blue Cheer	"Summertime Blues"	Eddie Cochran, Jerry Capehart	1967
281	The Purple Gang	"Granny Takes A Trip"	Beard/Bowyer	1967
282	Captain Beefheart	"Sure 'Nuff 'N Yes I Do"	Don Van Vliet/Herb Berman	1967
283	Love	"The Castle"	Arthur Lee	1967
284	Pink Floyd	"Arnold Layne"	Syd Barrett	1967
285	James Carr	"The Dark End of the Street"	Chips Moman/Dan Penn	1967
286	Cream	"Crossroads"	Robert Johnson	1968
287	Buffalo Springfield	"Expecting to Fly"	Neil Young	1968
288	Bonzo Dog Doo-Dah Band	"Canyons of Your Mind"	Viv Stanshall	1968
289	"Tyrannosaurus Rex"	"Salamanda Palaganda"	Marc Bolan	1968
290	Captain Beefheart	"Pachuco Cadaver"	Captain Beefheart	1969
291	Andy Capp	"Popatop"	Capp	1969
292	Family	"Hung Up Down"	Whitney/Chapman	1969
293	Mike Hart	"Almost Liverpool 8"	Hart	1969
294	Rod Stewart	"An Old Raincoat Won't Ever Let You Down"	Stewart	1970
295	Tim Buckley	"Song to the Siren"	Buckley	1970
296	Michael Chapman	"Postcards of Scarborough"	Chapman	1970
297	James Brown	"Lowdown Popcorn"	James Brown	1970
298	Rod Stewart	"Maggie May"	Stewart/Quittenton	1971
299	The Tams	"Hey Girl Don't Bother Me"	Whitley	1971
300	Nilsson	"Without You"	Pete Ham/Tom Evans	1971
301	Al Green	"Let's Stay Together"	Green/Jackson/Mitchell	1971
302	Captain Beefheart	"Big Eyed Beans From Venus"	Don Van Vliet	1972
303	Family	"My Friend The Sun"	Whitney/Chapman	1972
304	Matching Mole	"O Caroline"	Dave Sinclair/Robert Wyatt	1972
305	Mel & Tim	"Starting All Over Again"	Phillip Mitchell	1972
306	Thin Lizzy	"Whiskey in the Jar"	Lynott/Bell/Downey	1973
307	Stealers Wheel	"Stuck in the Middle With You"	Joe Egan/Gerry Rafferty	1973
308	The Wailers	"Duppy Conqueror"	Bob Marley	1973
309	The Allman Brothers Band	"Jessica"	Dickey Betts	1973
310	Status Quo	"Down Down"	Rossi/Young	1974
311	Don Covay	"It's Better To Have (And Don't Need)"	Covay/Watts	1974
312	Ann Peebles	"I Can't Stand the Rain"	Peebles/Bryant/Miller	1974
313	Richard & Linda Thompson	"I Want to See the Bright Lights Tonight"	R Thompson	1974
314	David Bowie	"Fame"	Bowie/Lennon/Alomar	1975
315	Burning Spear	"Slavery Days"		1975
316	Little Feat	"Long Distance Love"	Lowell George	1975
317	Millie Jackson	"Loving Arms"		1975
318	Racing Cars	"They Shoot Horses Don't They?"	Mortimer	1976
319	Jackson Browne	"Here Come Those Tears Again"	Jackson Browne, Nancy Farnsworth	1976
320	The Upsetters	"Croaking Lizard"	Lee "Scratch" Perry	1976
321	Ramones	"I Don't Wanna Walk Around With You"	Ramones	1976
322	Eddie and the Hot Rods	"Do Anything You Wanna Do"	Douglas/Hollis	1977
323	The Slits	"Shoplifting"	Pollitt/Albertine/Forster/Romero	1977
324	The Motors	"Dancing the Night Away"	Andy McMaster, Nick Garvey	1977
325	The Damned	"Stretcher Case"	Rat Scabies/Brian James	1977
326	Magazine	"Shot By Both Sides"	Howard Devoto/Pete Shelley	1978
327	The Rezillos	"I Can't Stand My Baby"	John Callis	1978
328	Culture	"See Them A Come"	Culture	1978
329	The Undertones	"Teenage Kicks"	John O'Neill	1978
330	Gang of Four	"At Home He's A Tourist"	Allen/Burnham/Gill/King	1979
331	The Quads	"There Must Be Thousands"	S Jones/J Doherty	1979
332	Misty In Roots	"Man Kind"	Misty in Roots	1979
333	The Freshmen	"You Never Heard Anything Like It"	Brown	1979
334	Joy Division	"Twenty Four Hours"	Joy Division	1980
335	The Fall	"Totally Wired"	Riley/Scanlon/Hanley/Smith	1980
336	Sheena Easton	"9 To 5"	Florrie Palmer	1980
337	Golinski Brothers	"Bloody"	Gibbs/Golinski/Harries	1980
338	Birthday Party	"Release The Bats"	Nick Cave/Mick Harvey	1981
339	The Specials	"Ghost Town"	Dammers	1981
340	Heaven 17	"(We Don't Need This) Fascist Groove Thang"	Glenn Gregory, Ian Craig Marsh, Martyn Ware	1981
341	Altered Images	"Dead Pop Stars"	Altered Images	1981
342	Culture	"Lion Rock"	Joseph Hill	1982
343	Grandmaster Flash & the Furious Five	"The Message"	Fletcher/Glover/Chase/Robinson	1982
344	Robert Wyatt	"Shipbuilding"	Langer/Costello	1982
345	Artery	"Into The Garden"	Gouldthorpe/Fidler/Wilson/Hinkler/McKenzie	1982
346	The Fall	"The Man Whose Head Expanded"	Hanley/Scanlon/Smith	1983
347	The Fall	"Kicker Conspiracy"	Smith	1983
348	New Order	"Leave Me Alone"	New Order	1983
349	This Mortal Coil	"Song to the Siren"	Tim Buckley	1983
350	Mighty Wah!	"Come Back"	Wylie	1984
351	The Fall	"Lay of the Land"	M E Smith/B Smith	1984
352	Half Pint	"Money Man Skank"		1984
353	The Smiths	"Reel Around The Fountain"	Marr	1984
354	The Jesus and Mary Chain	"Never Understand"	William Reid and Jim Reid	1985
355	Billy Bragg	"Between The Wars"	Bragg	1985
356	Roxanne Shante	"Queen of the Rox"		1985
357	Wedding Present	"Go Out And Get 'Em Boy"		1985
358	Salt-N-Pepa	"Tramp"		1986
359	Half Man Half Biscuit	"The Trumpton Riots"	Blackwell/Crossley	1986
360	Billy Bragg	"Levi Stubbs' Tears"	Bragg	1986
361	Culture	"Capture Rasta"	Hill/Walker/Dayes	1986
362	Eric B & Rakim	"I Know You Got Soul"	Eric Barrier, Rakim Allah	1987
363	Big Black	"L Dopa"	Big Black	1987
364	Barmy Army	"Sharp As A Needle"	Maxwell	1987
365	The Fall	"Hit The North"	Smith/Rogers/Smith	1987
366	Carcass	"Cadaveric Incubator of Endo Parasites"	Carcass	1988
367	My Bloody Valentine	"You Made Me Realise"	K Shields	1988
368	Mudhoney	"Sweet Young Thing Ain't Sweet No More"	Mudhoney	1988
369	Humanoid	"Stakker Humanoid"	Brian Dougans	1988
370	The Pixies	"Wave of Mutilation"	Black Francis	1989
371	New Order	"Vanishing Point"	New Order	1989
372	Pocket FishRmen	"The Leader Is Burning"	Brant Bingamon	1989
373	Maloko	"In the Midnight Hour"	Pickett/Cropper	1989
374	The Would Be's	"I'm Hardly Ever Wrong"	M Finnegan/E Finnegan	1990
375	Nirvana	"Sliver"	Nirvana	1990
376	Pavement	"Summer Babe"	Stephen Malkmus, Scott Kannberg	1990
377	Babes in Toyland	"House"	Babes in Toyland	1990
378	The Fall	"A Lot of Wind"	M E Smith	1991
379	PJ Harvey	"Dress"	PJ Harvey, Rob Ellis	1991
380	Wayne Wonder & Cutty Ranks	"Lambada"	Thomas	1991
381	Diblo & Le Groupe Loketo	"Joie De Vivre"	Diblo	1991
382	Dr Devious & His Wisemen	"Cyberdream"	Dr Devious	1992
383	Anthony Red Rose	"Tempo"		1992
384	The Wedding Present	"Silver Shorts"	Gedge	1992
385	Sonic Youth	"Sugar Kane"	Kim Gordon, Thurston Moore, Lee Ranaldo, Steve Shelley	1992
386	New Decade	"Statue of Gold"	New Decade	1993
387	Elastica	"Stutter"	Frischmann/Elastica	1993
388	New Bad Things	"I Suck"	New Bad Things	1993
389	Shaba Kahamba	"Bitumba"	Gustave/Apatout	1993
390	Stereolab	"Ping Pong"	Gane/Sadier	1994
391	Inspiral Carpets feat Mark E. Smith	"I Want You"	Inspiral Carpets	1994
392	Orbital	"Are We Here (Industry Standard mix)"	P&P Hartnoll	1994
393	Canopy & Matrix	"Arkines Lost"	Canopy & Matrix	1994
394	Dreadzone	"Zion Youth"	Dreadzone	1995
395	Pulp	"Sorted for E's & Wizz"	Cocker/Mackey/Senior/Banks/Doyle	1995
396	Long Fin Killie & Mark E. Smith	"Heads of Dead Surfers"		1995
397	Safe Deposit	"You Can't"	Safe Deposit	1995
398	Dick Dale	"Nitrus"	Dale	1996
399	Belle & Sebastian	"The State I'm In"	Stuart Murdoch	1996
400	Kenickie	"Come Out 2 Nite"	Lauren Laverne	1996
401	DJ Kaos	"Hold Me Now"	DJ Kaos	1996
402	Inter	"Happy Ending"	Boylan/Bray/Gill/Stovold	1997
403	Clinic	"IPC Subeditors Dictate Our Youth"	Clinic	1997
404	Helen Love	"Does Your Heart Go Boom"	Helen Love	1997
405	The Delgados	"Pull The Wires From The Wall"	The Delgados	1997
406	Derrero	"Radar Intruder"	Derrero	1998
407	Entity Squad	"Du fährst mich verrückt"		1998
408	Half Man Half Biscuit	"Turn A Blind Eye"	Half Man Half Biscuit	1998
409	Boards of Canada	"Aquarius"	Michael Sandison, Marcus Eoin	1998
410	Cay	"Princes & Princesses"	Cay	1999
411	Yo La Tengo	"It Takes a Lot to Laugh, It Takes a Train to Cry"	Bob Dylan	1999
412	Monkey Steals the Drum	"Injured Birds"	Monkey Steals The Drum	1999
413	Princess Kaiulani	"Alamoana Fade Away"	Princess Kaiulani	1999
414	Brian and Tony Gold	"Not Perfect"	Morrison/Thompson/Bryan	1999
415	New Order	"Brutal"	New Order	2000
416	Cinerama	"Manhattan"	Gedge/Cleave	2000
417	Kid Koala	"Music For Morning People"	Kid Koala	2000
418	Alfie	"Sure & Simple Time"	Alfie	2000
