= John Peel's Record Box =

2005 British TV programme

- Genre: Documentary
- Directed by: Elaine Shepherd
- Country of origin: United Kingdom
- Original language: English

Production
- Executive producer: Chris Wilson
- Producer: Anita Brown

Original release
- Network: Channel 4
- Release: 14 November 2005

John Peel's Record Box is a documentary film made by Elaine Shepherd, released on 14 November 2005 on Channel 4. It was nominated for a Primetime Emmy Award.

== Contents ==
The box contains a small private collection of the British radio DJ John Peel who died in 2004 at the age of 65. Peel's main archive contained more than 100,000 vinyl records and CDs. This smaller collection is 142 singles, some of them doublettes, stored in a wooden box representing some of his favourites. According to the documentary, there are no singles by Peel's favourite group, The Fall, because he kept them on a separate shelf.

The film features interviews with John's wife Sheila Ravenscroft, radio DJs and artists including Mary Anne Hobbs, Sir Elton John, Ronnie Wood, Roger Daltrey, Feargal Sharkey, Jack White, Michael Palin and Miki Berenyi.

== Inside John Peel's Record Box ==
No.	Artist	Title	Label	Year	Comments
1	Al Casey	"Surfin' Hootenanny" "Easy Pickin"	Pye International	1963	Dance-Craze Surf Instrumental with female group vocal excerpts
2	Al Ferrier	"I'm Not Drinking More" "Don't Play Blue Eyes'"	Master Trak	1974	Rockabilly
3	Alan Price Set	"I Put a Spell on You" "Iechyd-Da"	Decca Records	1966	A UK Chart hit – John Walters, Peel's long-time producer, was a member of The Alan Price Set, and played on this
4	Andy Capp; Reco	"Popatop" "The Lion Speaks"	Treasure Island	1969	Reggae Skinhead single
5	The Anemic Boyfriends	"Guys Are Not Proud" "Bad Girls in Love"	Red Sweater Records	1980	
6	Ann Peebles	"I can't stand the rain" "I've been there before"	London Records	1972	70s Soul track
7	Anti-Social	"Traffic lights" "Teacher, teacher"	Dynamite Records	1977	
8	Arthur K Adams	"Wildwood flower" "It's a wild, wild, wild, wild wildwood flower"	Jetstar	1966	R&B/Soul artist
9	Big Stick	"Drag racing" "Hell on earth"	Recess Records	1985	
10	Bill Oddie	"On Ilkla Moor Baht 'at" "Harry Krishna"	Dandelion Records	1970	The A side was a version of a traditional Yorkshire dialect folk song, rendered in the style of Joe Cocker's version of The Beatles' song "With a Little Help from My Friends"
11	Boards of Canada	"Aquarius" "Chinook"	Skam Records	1998	
12	Bobby Lee Trammell	"If you ever get it once" "Don't you know I love you"	Alley Records	1964	White R&B-Rock & Roll artist
13	Cat Power	"Headlights" "Darling Said Sir"	The Making of Americans	1994	
14	Charlie Feathers	"Nobody's darling'" "Deep elm blues"	Holiday Inn Records	1962	Rockabilly
15	Charlie Feathers	"Nobody's woman" "When you decide"	King Records	1957	
16	Charlie Feathers	"Wild wild party'" "Today and tomorrow"	Memphis Recordings	1961	Rockabilly
17	Charlie Feathers	"Tongue-tied Jill" "Get with it'"	Meteor Records	1956	repressing
18	Charlie Feathers	"Too much alike'" "When you come around"	King Records	1957	repressing
19	Cheeze	"Dancin with the Dead - Dancin queen" "Direwolf"	Bob Records	1989	Produced by Steve Albini
20	Clague	"The stride" "I wonder where"	Dandelion Records	1969	
21	Clefs of Lavender Hill	"Stop! - Get a ticket" "First tell me why"	Date	1966	Minor garage-pop hit, also released on UK CBS
22	Cleveland Crochet	"Sugar bee" "Drunkards dream"	Goldband	1960	
23	Don Covay	"It's better to have" "Leave him"	Mercury	1973	Soul
24	Don French	"Lonely Saturday night" "Goldilocks"	Quality	1959	Canadian issue
25	Dreamland Express	"Groovy" "u.f.o"	EMI	1980	
26	Eazy Teeth	"Car noise" "Her blade"	Dental Records	1980	Artwork for 7-inch front cover by Don Van Vliet aka Captain Beefheart
27	Eddie & Ernie	"I believe she will" "We try harder"	Chess	1964	Soul artist
28	Eddie & Ernie	"Outcast" "I'm gonna always love you"	Eastern	1965	Northern Soul
29	Eddie & Ernie	"Time waits for no one" "That's the way it is"	Eastern	1964	Soul artist
30	Electro Hippies	"Sheep" / "Starve The City (To Feed The Poor)" / "Meltdown" / "Escape" / "Deadend" / "Thought" / "Chickens" / "Mother" / "Mega-Armageddon Death"	Strange Fruit	1987	
31	Elmore James	"The sky is crying" "Standing at the crossroads"	Flashback Records	1959	1970s re-release of 1960 hit
32	Firemen	"Old Smokie" "Louie's Theme"	Le Cam	1964	
33	Freshmen	"You never heard anything like it" "Bombing run"	Release Records	1979	
34	G. L. Crockett	"It's a man down there" "Every hour, every day"	4 Brothers	1965	R&B-Blues
35	G. L. Crockett	"Look out Mabel" "Did you ever love somebody"	Checker	1965	re-release of alternate version
36	Geater Davis	"For your precious love" "Wrapped up in you"	House of Orange	1971	
37	Gene Dozier & The United Front	"Give the women what they want" "The best girl I ever had"	Mercury	1974	B-side is popular in Northern-Modern Soul
38	Golinski Brothers	"Bloody" "Toy"	Badge Records	1980	
39	The Greenhornes	"Shadow of grief" "Stayed up last night"	Italy Records	2000	
40	Hooton 3 Car	"Danny" "Numena"	Rumblestrip Records	1995	
41	Idle Race	"Here we go round the lemon tree" "My father's son"	Liberty	1967	Issued in the US and Europe but not in UK. In the UK the song was issued by a Roy Wood related group The Move.
42	Izzy Royal	"Coronation St" "Coronation Dub"	WEA	1983	Reggaefied version of the TV theme
43	Jane Bond and The Undercover Men	"Hot rod Lincoln" "Come on up"	Ear Movies Records	1982	
44	Jerry Byrd	"Memories of Maria" "Invitation"	Monument	1961	
45	Jody Reynolds	"Endless sleep" "Western movies"	Liberty	1958	the B-side is an Olympics 1958 track, perhaps a 1970s reissue
46	Johnnie Taylor	"I've been born again" "At night time"	Stax	1974	Classic Soul artist
47	Johnny Adams	"You're a lady" "I wish it would rain"	Atlantic	1972	Classic Soul artist
48	Johnny Fortune	"Dragster" "Soul surfer"	Sonet	1964	
49	Ken Colyer's Jazzmen	"If I ever cease to love" / "Bucket's got a hole in it" "Wildcat blues" / "Wabash blues"	Tempo Records	1953	UK jazz group, on UK mid 50s EP
50	La peste	"Black" "Better off dead"	Black Records	1978	
51	Larry Bright	"Mojo workout" "I'll change my ways"	Tide	1960	
52	Laurie Anderson	"O Superman" "Walk the dog"	One Ten Records	1981	No. 2 UK hit, a very long hypnotic synth-pop track
53	Lee Perry	"Bafflin' smoke signal" "Black smoke signal"	Black Arc	1978	Reggae
54	Lightnin' Hopkins	"Mojo hand" "Glory be"	Flashback Records	1960	1970s reissue
55	Marc Bolan	Marc Bolan talking to Stevie Dixon "Jennifer Sharp, Steve"	Ube/Pye Records	1973	
56	Mary Monday and her Bitches	"I gave my punk jacket to Richie" "Popgun"	Malicious Productions	1977	
57	Max Romeo	"Sipple out deh' Lee Perry" "Revelation"	Upsetter	1976	Reggae artist
58	MC5	"Looking at you" "Borderline"	A-Square Records	1968	2 copies. "Kick Out The Jams" was their known hit with the spoken intro
59	Medicine Head	"Coast to coast" "All for tomorrow"	Dandelion Records	1970	
60	Medicine Head	"His guiding hand" "This love of old"	Dandelion Records	1969	
61	Mel and Tim	"Starting all over again" "It hurts to want it so bad"	Stax	1972	Big USA Soul hit, Best known in UK for "Backfield in Motion" song from 1969.
62	Maow featuring Neko Case	"Kat nip" / "One night stand" / "Anthem" / "Kill kill kill" / "Catastrophe" / "Boy groupies"	Twist Like This Records	1992	
63	Mickey Lee Lane	"Tutti Frutti" "With your love"	Mala	1968	White R&B-rock artist best known for his 1965 "Hey Sah-Lo-Ney" and "Shaggy Dog" 45s
64	Mike Spenser and The Cannibals	"Good guys" "Nothing takes the place of you"	Big Cock Records	1978	B-side (cover of Toussaint McCall) preferred.
65	The Nice	"The thoughts of Emerlist Davjack" "Azrial (Angel of Death)"	Immediate	1967	UK prog art rock pop
66	Nilsson	"Without You" "Gotta Get Up"	RCA	1971	The big ballad UK No 1 hit
67	Nilsson	"Everybody's Talkin'" "Don't Leave Me"	RCA	1968	Midnight Cowboy film song
68	Nilsson	"Kojak Columbo" "Turn Out The Light"	RCA	1975	
69	O. V. Wright	"That's how strong my love is" "There goes my used to be"	Goldwax	1964	USA R&B-Soul artist
70	Paul Blake & The Blood Fire Posse	"Every posse get flat" "Flat out"	Studio Work	1984	Early Reggae Dancehall hit
71	Paul Revere & The Raiders	"Him or Me – What's It Gonna Be?" "Legend of Paul Revere"	CBS	1967	USA Garage-pop group
72	Pavement	"Demolition Plot J-7: Forklift" / "Spizzle trunk" / "Recorder grot" / "Internal K-Dart" / "Perfect depth" / "Recorder grot"	Drag City	1990	
73	Pocket Fishrmen	"Yr story" "The leader is burning"	Noiseville	1989	
74	The Quads	"There must be thousands" "You've gotta jive"	Big Bear Records	1979	Sometimes mistakenly listed with A and B sides reversed
75	Ray Martin	"Blue tango" "Belle of the ball"	Columbia Records	1952	One of the first 45 rpm records issued in UK in early 1953. Also the first record that Peel bought
76	Revelino	"Step on high" "Memoreason"	Musicdisc	1996	
77	Rod Bernard	"This should go on forever" "Pardon Mr. Gordon"	Jin Records or Argo Records	1958	USA Rock & Roll-Pop artist
78	Roshell Anderson	"The Grapevine Will Lie Sometimes" "Such A Beautiful Thing"	Contempo	1974	USA Soul artist
79	Roy Head	"Treat her right" "So long, my love"	Vocalion	1965	USA white R&B-rock artist
80	Sam & Dave	"I Can't Stand Up for Falling Down" "Soothe me (live)"	Stax	1966	Original version of Elvis Costello's 1980 hit record
81	Sasha Caro	"Grade 3 section 2" "Little maid's song"	Decca Records	1967	Obscure UK artist who also released '"Molotov Molotov"/"Never Play a B Side"'
82	Scrugg	"Will the real Geraldine please stand up and be countered" "Only George'"	Pye	1969	John T Kongos psychedelic-pop act, last of 3 singles
83	Sheena Easton	"9 to 5" "Moody"	EMI	1980	UK Scottish female artist who got her break on a BBC TV show
84	Sipho Bhengu & His Alto Sax	"Tickey dopies" "I saluti"	Inkonkoni	1971	South African Music
85	Soledad Brothers	"Sugar & spice" "Johnny's death letter"	Italy Records	1998	with Jack White
86	Some Chicken	"New Religion" "Blood on the Wall"	Raw Records	1977	
87	Spit Out	"O from I" "Tan" "Rot'n'roll'"	Ma Frog Records	1996	
88	Stanley Winston	"No more ghettos in America" "It's alright"	Jewel	1970	
89	Status Quo	"Down Down" "Night Ride"	Vertigo	1974	UK No 1 hit
90	Supersister	"No tree will grow" "She was naked"	Dandelion Records	1971	
91	The Beatles	"Come Together" "Octopus's Garden" "Something"	Melodiya	1969	Likely an East European issue of semi-legal status
92	The Big Three	"You've Gotta Keep Her Under Hand" "If You Ever Change Your Mind"	Decca Records	1964	Early Merseybeat group
93	Buzzcocks	"Ever Fallen in Love (With Someone You Shouldn't've)" "Just Lust"	United Artists	1978	UK chart hit
94	The Factory	"Path through the forest" "Gone"	MGM	1968	UK Psychedelic
95	The Galactic Symposium	"Y.M.C.A" "Money "	Vague Records	1978	
96	The Legion of Super-Heroes	"The great name dropper part 1" "The great name dropper part 2"	Amy Records	2000	
97	The Mark Four	"Hurt Me If You Will" "I'm Leaving"	Decca Records	1965	Mod Beat UK group, later named The Creation, who had hits with "Making Time" and "Painter Man"
98	The Mighty Avengers	"So Much in Love" "Sometime They Say"	Decca Records	1964	UK beat group, A side is a Rolling Stones song
99	The Misunderstood	"I Can Take You To The Sun" "Who do you love?"	Fontana	1966	USA Garage-Psych group
100	The Move	"I Can Hear the Grass Grow" "Wave the flag and stop the train"	Deram	1967	UK 1967 big chart hit, related to 'Idle Race' record above
101	The Negatives	"Love is not real" "Stakeout"	Look	1979	
102	The Nightcaps	"Wine wine wine" "Nightcap rock"	Musicor	1959	USA Rock & Roll group
103	The Ramrods	"Riders in the sky" "Zig zag"	London American	1960	Big hit in USA & UK. Song also known as "Ghost Riders in the Sky"
104	The Smoke	"My Friend Jack" "We can take it"	Columbia Records	1966	Banned UK mod psych track 'My friend Jack eats sugarlumps...'
105	The Squirrels	"Oz on 45" "Alone again"	PopLlama	1988	
106	The Undertones	"Teenage Kicks" / "True Confessions" "Smarter Than U" / "Emergency Cases"	Good Vibrations	1978	The first issue of this classic track in a custom fold-around sleeve, before the 'Sire' hit issue
107	The Upholsterers	"Makers of high grade suites" "I ain't superstitious" / "Pain"	Sympathy for the Record Industry	2000	
108	The Upsetters	"Bucky skank" "Yucky skank"	Down Town	1973	Reggae Roots by Lee Perry
109	The Upsetters	"Key card" "Domino game"	DL International	1975	Reggae Roots by Lee Perry
110	The Users	"Sick of you" "I'm in love with today"	Raw Records	1977	UK Punk group
111	The Versatiles	"Cutting rasor" "Black belt Jones"	DL International	1974	Reggae Roots
112	The White Stripes	"Lafayette Blues" "Sugar never tasted so good"	Italy Records	1998	
113	The White Stripes	"Party of Special Things to Do" "China Pig" "Ashtray Heart"	Sub Pop	2000	
114	The White Stripes	Merry Christmas From The White Stripes: "Candy Cane Children" / "The reading of the story of the Magi, the singing of Silent Night"	XL Recordings	2002	
115	The White Stripes	"It takes two, baby" "Fell in Love With a Girl"	Sympathy for the Record Industry	2001	
116	The White Stripes	"Dead Leaves and the Dirty Ground" "Stop Breaking Down"	XL Recordings	2002	
117	The White Stripes; The Dirtbombs	"Hand Springs" "Cedar Point '76"	Extra-Ball Records	1999	For Multiball Magazine
118	The White Stripes	"Hotel Yorba (Live at the Hotel Yorba)" "Rated X"	XL Recordings	2001	
119	The White Stripes	"Lord, Send Me an Angel" "You're pretty good looking (Trendy American Remix)"	Sympathy for the Record Industry	2002	
120	The White Stripes	"Hello operator" "Jolene"	Sympathy for the Record Industry	2000	
121	The White Stripes	"The Big Three Killed My Baby" "Red Rolling Ball Ruth"	Sympathy for the Record Industry	1999	2 copies.
122	The Hentchmen featuring Jack White	"Some other guy" "Psycho Daisies"	Italy Records	1997	
123	2 Star Tabernacle featuring Andre Williams	"Lily White Mama and Jet Black Daddy" "Ramblin man'"	Bloodshot Records	1998	Cover photo by Jack White. "Ramblin' man" is cover of Hank Williams.
124	The Wildbunch	"Danger (High Voltage)" "Neurocameraman" / "She's Guatemala"	Flying Bomb Records	2001	
125	The White Stripes; Rocket 455; The Blowtops	"Candy Cane Children" "Santa Ain't Coming For Christmas" "Sidewalk Santa"	Flying Bomb Records	1998	
126	The Dirtbombs; MHz; The Real Pills	"My Last Xmas" "Secret Santa" "It's Almost December"	Flying Bomb Records	2000	
127	Travis Wammack	"Fire fly" "Scratchy"	ARA	1964	B-Side preferred. "Scratchy" a quirky R&B instrumental, was issued as an A-side on UK Atlantic records in 1964
128	XL Capris	"My city of Sydney" "Dead budgies"	Axle	1980	On a broadcast for BFBS (the British Forces Broadcasting Service) John stated that the record had been sent to him by "someone actually from Sydney, Australia". On his Radio One show on 1 August 2000 a listener requested this song ahead of the upcoming Sydney Olympics. John noted that it had been consistently the most requested song on the shows he recorded for broadcast in Germany.
129	Yami Bolo	"Richer than Cory" "Richard Version"	Jamaica International	1998	Reggae Dancehall. John claimed to have "about 50 Yami Bolo 7" singles, and a lot of really good ones in there"
130	Yardbirds	"Happenings Ten Years Time Ago" "Psycho Daisies"	Columbia Records	1966	UK classic 60s psych/mod group
