= Biffo =

Biffo may refer to:

- Biffo the Bear, a character in the British comic The Beano
- Paul Rose (writer) (born 1971), a.k.a. Mr. Biffo, games magazine editor, writer of a column named "Biffovision"
- Dave "Biffo" Beech, drummer/vocalist in British bands The Mighty Avengers and Jigsaw
- John Bindon (1943–1993), British actor and gangster
- A pejorative nickname for someone from County Offaly, Ireland
  - particularly associated with Irish politician Brian Cowen
