= Hamilton Hill =

Hamilton Hill may refer to:

== Places ==
- Hamilton Hill, Western Australia, a suburb of the city of Perth, Australia
- Hamilton Hill, South Australia, an area within the suburb of Woodforde, South Australia

== Other uses ==
- Hamilton Hill (singer) (1871–1910), Australian baritone singer
- Hamilton Hill (character), the fictional mayor of Gotham City in the DC Comics continuity

== See also ==
- Hamilton Hills, neighborhood of Baltimore, Maryland
