= Rote Rosen (disambiguation) =

Rote Rosen may refer to:

- "Rote Rosen", poem by Theodor Storm
- "Rote Rosen", TV series
- "Rote Rosen", song from list of compositions by Richard Strauss
- "Rote Rosen", song by Freddy Breck
