= Charles Dale (disambiguation) =

Charles Dale is the name of:

- Charles Dale (comedian) (1881–1971), American vaudeville comedian
- Charles Dale (born 1963), Welsh actor
- Charles M. Dale (1893–1978), governor of New Hampshire, U.S.A.
- Charles Dale (musician) from Johnny Hamp's Kentucky Serenaders

== See also ==
- Charles Dail, American Democratic politician
