= The Galactic Symposium =

British punk covers band

- Origin: Nottingham
- Genres: rock music
- Years active: 1979–1984
- Website: galactic-symposium.com

The Galactic Symposium were a covers band from Nottingham, England. Active from 1979 to c. 1984, the band became known for releasing "unconventional" versions of famous rock songs. Their records were played on BBC Radio 1 by DJ John Peel.

== Career ==
The band formed in Nottingham in 1979. Although it was composed of competent musicians, the ethos of Galactic Symposium was "unconventional" and they approached recording with laughter and an irreverent approach intended to skewer the "seriousness of professional music". The band claimed to be "rock music's answer to the Portsmouth Symphonia".

In January 1980 Galactic Symposium released a cover of "Money", which Pink Floyd themselves described as "appalling". Later that same year, in May, the release of a cover of Village People song "Y.M.C.A." received a critical review in Record Mirror which stated the song should "clear [dance]floors quickly".

The band become better known when BBC Radio 1 disc jockey John Peel played their songs on his show. Following the death of Peel in 2004, it was revealed that he had kept a collection of favourite records separately, now known as John Peel's Record Box. Amongst the records, the Galactic Symposium single "Y.M.C.A."/"Money" was included. The selection was the subject of a 2005 documentary.

As of 1984, the band were continuing to play live in Nottingham. In 2005, an album, John Peel Presents... YMCA, comprising 12 "inept" cover versions was rereleased on Low Down Kids Records. By 2007, the bands "Y.M.C.A." 7" single had become a collector item as part of its presence within John Peel's Record Box, with an article in Record Collector citing the rarity of Galactic Symposiums releases.

== Members ==
- David Price (guitar)
- Tim Minnitt (vocals)
- Simon Husbands (drummer)
- Ben Ross (bass)
- Michael Cosman (saxophone)

== Discography ==
- "Money" (1980)
- "Y.M.C.A." (1980)
- "Sunshine of Your Love"
