= Derrero =

Welsh band

- Origin: Newport, Wales, United Kingdom
- Years active: 1996–
- Labels: Big Noise Recordings, Sylem Records, Recordiau Cae Gwyn Records, Recordiau Prin, Size 8 Recordings
- Members: Andy Fung; Ashley Cooke; David Hirst
- Past members: Mary Wycherley
- Website: derrero.bandcamp.com

Derrero is a Welsh band formed in Newport in 1996 by singers and guitar players Andy Fung and Ashley Cooke, keyboard player Mary Wycherley and bass player David Hirst. Their first single "Dipstick" / "Tiny Shoes" was released in 1997 on Size 8 Recordings, followed by their eponymous debut album on producer Greg Haver's Big Noise Recordings. They subsequently released three EPs before releasing their second full-length album Fixation with Long Journeys in 2000. Their final album before disbanding, Comb the Breaks, was released in 2002 on Sylem Records. In 2000, Derrero backed John Cale playing his song "Buffalo Ballet" in the Marc Evans-directed documentary Beautiful Mistake.

Between 1999 and 2001, the band appeared three times on John Peel's BBC Radio 1 show and their song "Radar Intruder" was included in the Peel-curated Peelennium list.

In 2016, the band reformed and played a gig at Cardiff's The Moon club as part of the Sŵn festival. In 2019, Derrero released the Lost Fixations EP, their first new music in seventeen years. It was followed by three full-length albums: Time Lapse (2020), Curvy Lines (2022) and Breezing Up (2024).

== Discography ==
=== Albums ===
- Derrero (1997)
- Fixation with Long Journeys (2000)
- Comb the Breaks (2002)
- Time Lapse (2020)
- Curvy Lines (2022)
- Breezing Up (2024)

=== EPs ===
- Small Pocket Machine (1997)
- Radar Intruder (1998)
- Unstraightforwardtune (1998)
- Lost Fixations (2019)

=== Singles ===
- "Dipstick" / "Tiny Shoes" (1997)
- "Radar Intruder" / "She Wiped the Floor" (1998)
- "Aerial Angle" / "Vine in Mind" (2001)
