= Sterling Bose =

American jazz trumpeter & cornetist (1906–1958)

- Born: Sterling Belmont Bose; September 23, 1906; Florence, Alabama, U.S.
- Died: July 23, 1958 (aged 51) St. Petersburg, Florida, U.S.
- Genres: Jazz; Dixieland jazz
- Occupation: Musician
- Instruments: Trumpet; cornet
- Years active: 1920s–1950s
- Formerly of: Arcadian Serenaders; Jean Goldkette's Orchestra; Ben Pollack

Sterling Belmont "Bozo" Bose (Note: His name was sometimes misspelled as "Stirling".) (September 23, 1906 – July 23, 1958) was an American jazz trumpeter and cornetist. His work with Glenn Miller (1935–1938) in a trumpet–violin duo, and on various albums from 1937 to 1947, in a trombone duo, proved him an early proponent in double instrumentation. His style was heavily influenced by Bix Beiderbecke and changed little over the course of his life.

== Biography ==
Sterling Bose was born on September 23, 1906, in Florence, Alabama. His early experience came with Dixieland jazz bands in his native Alabama before moving to St. Louis, Missouri, in 1923. He played with the Crescent City Jazzers, later renamed the Arcadian Serenaders, and with Jean Goldkette's Orchestra in 1927 until 1928, after the departure of Beiderbecke. Following this, he worked in the house band at radio station WGN in Chicago before joining Ben Pollack from 1930 to 1933. He also worked with Eddie Sheasby in Chicago but moved to New York City in 1933. He had many gigs in New York in the 1930s and 1940s, including time with Joe Haymes (1934–35) and Tommy Dorsey (1935), Ray Noble (1936), Benny Goodman (1936), Lana Webster, Glenn Miller (1937), Bob Crosby (1937–39), Bobby Hackett (1939), Bob Zurke, Jack Teagarden, Bud Freeman (1942), George Brunies, Bobby Sherwood (1943), Miff Mole, Art Hodes, Horace Heidt (1944), and Tiny Hill (1946). Following these engagements, he did some further freelancing in Chicago and New York, then moved to Florida in 1948, setting up his own bands there.

Bose suffered from an extended period of illness in the 1950s and eventually committed suicide in July 1958 in St. Petersburg, Florida.
