= BASF (record label) =

- Distributor: Various
- Genre: Various
- Country of origin: Germany

BASF was a record label that existed during the 1970s. The label issued thousands of recordings by artists of many genres. Artists who had releases on the label include, Hans Juergen Baeumler, Candlewick Green, Don Cherry, Cindy and Bert, George Duke, Freddy Breck, Ella Fitzgerald, Peter Garden, Erroll Garner, Jim Hall, Don "Sugarcane" Harris, Earl "Fatha" Hines, Rudolf Kempe, Manuela, Oscar Peterson, The Dave Pike Set and many others.

== Background ==
The BASF record label was the vinyl record division of the BASF chemical group.

During the 1970s, the label had ventured into the quadraphonic area. The label's quadraphonic releases included Demonstration in Quadro, Fantastic Quadro by rosse Orchester Spielen Welthits and Musik Total Erleben.

As of April 1972, the contact for the United States was BASF Systems, Inc., Crosby Drive, Bedford, Mass. 01730. And for Canada it was BASF Canada Ltd., P.O. Box 430, Station St. Laurent, Montreal 379, Quebec.

== History ==
According to the 20 February 1971 issue of Billboard, BASF were to set up their record label early in the following year. The company was currently looking for a pressing and distribution deal to market record discs and tapes under the BASF banner.

The first of March was the date given for the company's move into the record business with the BASF label making its debut in Germany. Werner Cyprys a German producer had for some time already been active in building up a ready catalogue for the label's introduction. The label had also taken on board, Sigrid Volkmann, a German producer from Munich. Some of the artists which would be releasing their work through BASF were, Daniela, Gisela Marell, Hans Juergen Baeumler (ice star), John O'Brian Docker (guitarist ), Arno Flor (big band leader), Thomas Fritsch (actor), Peter Garden (TV star), Rolf Kuehn (jazz star), and Dieter Thomas.

They had already sealed a distribution deal with MPS Records. The MPS catalogue included work by includes material by Ella Fitzgerald, Oscar Peterson and Erroll Garner. The deal also included the budget cassette company Polyband.

It was announced in the 24 April 1971 issue of Record World that BASF had made the decision to move into the pre-recorded tape field. Klaus Laubrunn was heading the operation with producer, Sigrid Volkmann. Needing a ready supply of material, it was said that BASF would be using the repertoire of MPS records. They had a ready supply of over 200 recordings. Ella Fitzgerald, Oscar Peterson, Erroll Garner, Friedrich Gulda, and Horst Jankowski were the artists that had ready recordings to use. Hans Georg Brunner-Schwer was heading the MPS repertoire division. BASF felt then that in five to ten years that tape cartridges (meaning cassettes) would have fifty percent of the German market.

It was reported by Paul Seigel in the 25 September 1971 issue of Record World that 2,000,000 German marks had been paid for songstress Manuela of Telefunken-Decca to come to BASF. This had apparently caused concern to other record company executives about holding on to their artists. It was also reported that Cindy and Bert were set to do good with their BASF single, "Ich fand eine Hand".

The 29 April 1972 issue of Billboard (page 22) featured ads from the Shorewood Packaging Corporation welcoming BASF Records to America and the PRC Recording Company welcoming BASF Records to the American scene. The following page had some of the label's artists who had their work released on the label. They were Don "Sugarcane" Harris with Fiddler On The Rock, Earl "Fatha" Hines with Fatha & His Flock On Tour, Jim Hall with It's Nice to Be With You, Dave Pike Set with Infa Red, Ella Fitzgerald with Watch What Happens, Oscar Peterson with Motions & Emotions and Hello Herbie, The Kenny Clarke Big Band with All Smiles, Milt Buckner Trio with Play Chords, and Don Cherry with Eternal Rhythm.

The 12 May 1973 issue of Billboard showed three BASF releases in the charts. Cindy & Bert were at no. 5 in the German chart with "Immer Wieder Sonntags" and Freddy Breck was at no. 7 with "Bianca". Breck also had an album, Uberall Auf Der Welt at no. 10 in the Dutch chart.

According to the 19 January, 1974 issue of Billboard, a deal had been signed with BASF and the British Decca Record company for the UK pressing, release and distribution of BASF records and pre-recorded cassettes. Arthur Cullis the Decca director and Hans-Jochen Versemann the BASF marketing director had sealed the deal at the Ludwigshafen-based BASF Headquarters. Henry Pattinson who was the audio-video division of BASF in the UK was confident that the association with Decca would expand the growth and impact of the BASF catalogue in the UK. The article also mentioned that BASF's UK operation had not been running at capacity due to on-going efforts to find a UK licensee.

George Duke's Faces in Reflection album was reviewed in the 22 June 1974 issue of Billboard. Released on BASF MC 22018, it was also one of the top album picks in the jazz section. According to the reviewer, he has scored a major success with the release. The reviewer also said that this was the first time that his keyboard genius had been shown. The tracks, "Psychosomatic Dung", "The Opening" and "Da Somba" were singled out as the best on the album. Don "Sugarcane" Harris' album I'm On Your Case, released on BASF MC 21912 was also reviewed in the Recommended LP's pop section the 22 June issue. The issue also noted that Candlewick Green's song, "Who Do You Think You Are" which had an exclusive release in the US on BASF had been in the British charts for seven weeks. It was also a Record World pick and recommended in the Gavin Report.

By mid-1975, Rudolf Kempe, the principal conductor of Munich Philharmonic and new BBC Symphony Orchestra chief conductor had entered into a new contract with BASF. The 26 July issue of Music Week reported that there were already two recordings made by BASF and would be issued via Decca in the Autumn.

By October 1975, the duo Cindy & Bert and solo artist Freddy Breck had been doing well. With new singles out they had sold more than 100,000 singles. Other artists that were of importance to BASF were saxophonist Pete Tex, Peter Rubin and Renate Kern. The label's roster had also grown with the addition of five new artists, Angela Branca, Reiner Rodin, Charlotte & Jurgen Wentling, Hanna Heller and Rene Martin. Tritonus and Embryo were two groups that they were hoping to have success with. They had also signed up former Los Bravos lead singer Mike Kennedy. There was success with the Cologne-based group Bläck Fööss who had sold more than 50,000 copies of their debut album. They were also doing well with the German choir Westphalian Nightingales. With a fourteen to seventeen percent turnover from classical sales, BASF was planning to release recordings by Dietrich Fischer Dieskau and Edith Mathis. In Jazz, BASF was using the MPS catalogue for all of their releases in genre. Besides the American acts they were experiencing above-average sales with German artists such as Volker Kriegel and Wolfgang Dauner. BASF had also moved into the children's recorded music field which was still being developed.
