= Inter (band) =

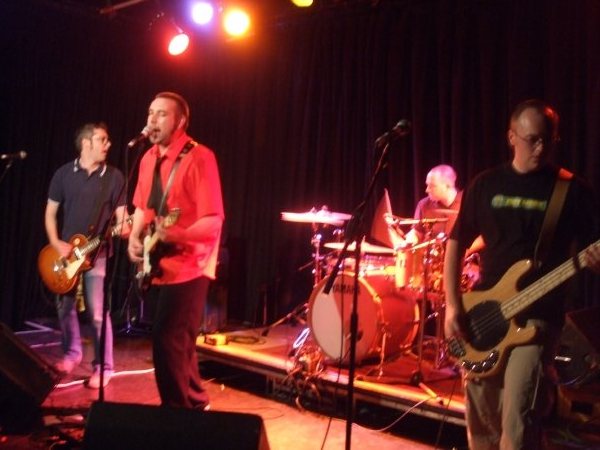
- (L-R) Sid, Steven, Johnny, Michael

Background information
- Genres: Pop punk, indie rock
- Years active: 1995–2001
- Labels: Pet Sounds, Yoshiko, Blag Records
- Members: Michael Boylan – bass Steven Bray – guitar/vocals Johnny Gill – drums Sid Stovold – guitar

Inter was a British band active in the late 1990s and closely associated with the post-Britpop pop punk scene.

== History ==
The band was formed in late 1995, with the lineup of Michael Boylan, Steven Bray and Johnny Gill. Sid Stovold, who had been helping the band out at rehearsals, joined soon after. From the start, the ethic of the band was to appear spontaneous on-stage, whilst still being musically tight. Live shows were characterized by energetic performances and on-stage joking around between songs. Preferring to concentrate on substance over style, the band members were renowned for dressing down and wearing their glasses on stage, whilst the vocals were delivered with pointedly southern English phrasing.

1996 saw the appearance of the demo/release Product (brilliantly named after randomly picking a word from the ingredients list of a packet of peanuts) which received praise for its engagingly catchy songwriting. The band spent the next couple of years gaining a reputation as one of the hardest working unsigned bands (largely due to the efforts of manager and promoter, "Rubberhead" Pete Cole) and developing an infectiously fun and chaotic on-stage style. Several rave reviews in the national music press followed. During this time, Inter was featured on Fierce Panda's Screecher Comforts EP with the track, Cherry Red Electric Blue and headlined NME's 1997 Brats Unsigned. They also featured on a Spanish advertising campaign for Casio. In 1997, the band recorded their debut single, Happy Ending, which was mastered at Abbey Road Studios and released on the Pet Sounds label. The track received regular national radio airplay and led to the band recording their first Peel Session for BBC Radio 1 at Maida Vale studios. The band also appeared at the Radio 1 roadshow held in Albert Square, Manchester.

In 1998, Inter signed a contract with Yoshiko Records, a recently formed UK based independent label. The band continued to build a growing fan base with some outstanding live shows throughout the year, and began to introduce a more expansive, melodic and mature sound to the set. The end of the year had the band recording tracks for its debut album at Loco studios in South Wales with producer, Mark Wallis. Early in 1999, Inter's first single from these sessions, National Paranoia, was released, reaching number 10 in the independent singles charts. The band also recorded their second Peel session and featured two brand new unreleased tracks. Additionally, the song Happy Ending was chosen as part of Radio 1's Peelennium series.

Logistical problems within the record company meant that the singles Radio Finland and Speed Racer, and the debut album Got My Nine, were not released until 2000, albeit to more favourable reviews. Got My Nine was released on CD as well as a limited edition 12” vinyl with a bonus 7” single and sold over 7000 copies in its first week of release. However, the record label was suffering from behind-the-scenes management problems and the band was dropped in the middle of 2000. Songs for the band's second studio album had been written but remained unrecorded.

Inter scaled down its activity and eventually ended in early 2001 after supporting Stiff Little Fingers at the Forum in London.

The band briefly reformed in 2005 to play a benefit show for the British Heart Foundation in honour of their friend and roadie, Richard Hazell, who had recently died.

In 2009, the band members were once again asked to play, this time for the August wedding of their one-time manager, Pete Cole. Because of the occasion, the four duly agreed and performed a brief set (with only a couple of hours' rehearsal) at the West End Centre in Aldershot, which had always been considered the band's home venue.

2025 finally saw Inter added to major streaming platforms such as Spotify, Apple Music, YouTube Music and other available services.

== Discography ==
- "Product" (demo) – 1996, self-released
- "Happy Ending" (single) – 1997, Pet Sounds (PET03CDS)
- "National Paranoia" (single) – 1999, Yoshiko (YR-002-CDS001)
- "Radio Finland" (single) – 2000, Yoshiko (YR-002-CDS002)
- "Speed Racer" (single) – 2000, Yoshiko (YR-002-CDS003)
- "Got My Nine" (album) – 2000, Yoshiko (YR-002-CDA001)
- "Product" (demo) – 2025, Blag Records (reissue)
- "Got My Nine" (album) – 2025, Blag Records (reissue)
- "Got My Nine B-Sides" (album) – 2025, Blag Records
- "Got My Nine Demos" (album) – 2025, Blag Records
- "The Beautiful Life" (EP) – 2025, Blag Records

== Press quotes ==
'Effusive enthusiasm and ricocheting tunefulness ... ahead of the nouveau teen-punk pack' – NME
'The kings of the catchy, cheesy chorus' – Melody Maker
'The best pop song in the last 30 years' (Happy Ending) – John Peel
'A rather irresistible romp through small-town Britain' – Everett True
'...highlights included a spiky, joking, flat-out pop set from Farnborough's Inter' – Steve Lamacq
'Unusually loveable' (Got My Nine) – Q magazine
