= Anti-Social (band) =

British punk rock band

- Also known as: Maniac
- Origin: Birmingham, United Kingdom
- Genres: Punk rock
- Years active: 1977–1988
- Labels: Dynamite
- Past members: Robert Fern; Johnny Harrison; Matt Smith; Paul Cooper; Gabrielle Fern

Anti-Social were a British punk rock band from Birmingham, United Kingdom, formed in 1977. They released one single, "Traffic Lights/Teacher Teacher" on Dynamite Records DRO1, that is now one of the rarest UK punk record releases and was included in John Peel's Record Box. They became nationally infamous by advertising for someone to commit suicide live on stage for which the band would pay them £15,000.

== Early history and record ==
In 1974 bass player Matt Smith joined with vocalist and guitar Robert Fern and drummer Johnny Harrison in a band called Maniac, which was later changed to Anti-Social. After gigging for a while, they recorded what would turn out to be a rare UK punk rock single release, "Traffic Lights" backed with "Teacher, Teacher" at Outlaw Recording Studios in Birmingham. The single was released on the Dynamite Label (DR01) in 1977. Paul Morley reviewed their single in NME in January 1978, calling it "archaic rock song sneered with incongruous, but violently necessary contempt." Matt Smith left during these sessions (now married to Carolyn Spence who worked at UK's Sounds magazine) Matt felt that the constant aggression associated with the band was no longer to his liking and was replaced first by Paul Cooper and then by Gabrielle Fern.

== Suicide offer ==
The band's label manager, Bob Green, offered £15,000 to any volunteer who would commit suicide live on stage via a guillotine. Nobody took the offer but the Department of Public Prosecutions was angered and the band was arrested.

== Epitaph ==
Band's manager Les Hemmings died in a car crash in the 1970s, while delivering copies of the single to various shops. The Studio Recordings to their follow up single were stolen and their final gig (at the Kingshurst Labour Club) ended with drummer Harrison playing a drum solo on an audience member's head, an offense for which he was later arrested and charged. Harrison phoned Rob Fern the next day to inquire as to whether he was still in the band, to which Fern replied, "There is no band". The 7 inch record now sells for upward of £500 and has thus led to bootleg copies swamping the market (easy to recognize as they have the release date of 1978 instead of original 1977 and have incorrect label credits).

== Trivia ==
Musician Justin Broadrick is the son of Gabrielle Fern and step-son of Robert Fern.
