= Cindy and Bert =

German schlager vocal duo

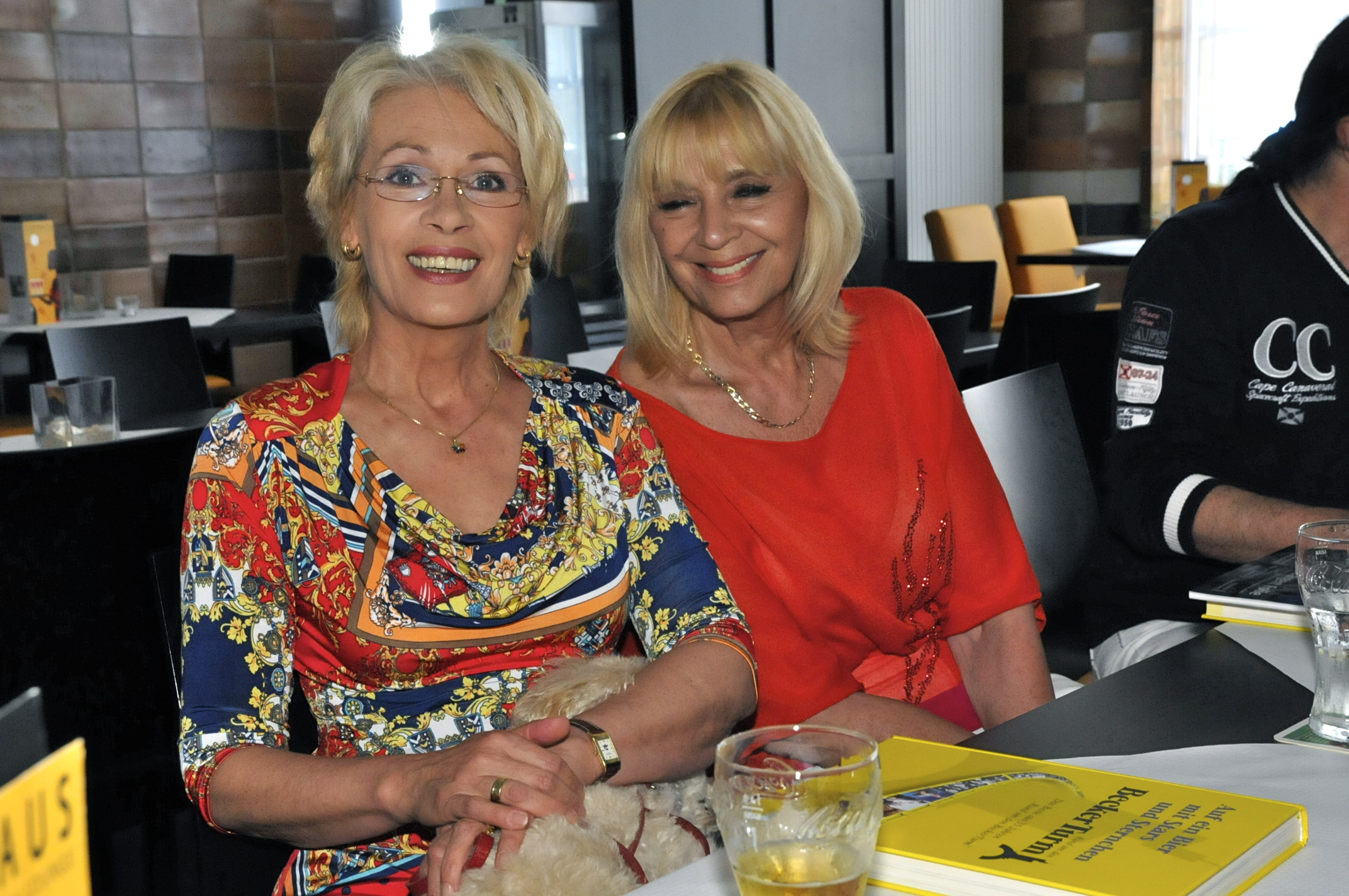
The pop singers Ingrid Peters (left) and Cindy Berger (right) during the book launch of "On a beer with stars and starlets – the best of 35 years around the BECKER TOWER".

Cindy and Bert were a German schlager vocal duo from Völklingen, Saarland consisting of Jutta Gusenberger (born 26 January 1948) and Norbert Berger (12 September 1945 – 14 July 2012). They were most successful in the 1970s, and are known for their participation in the 1974 Eurovision Song Contest.

== Background ==
One of the labels that the duo recorded for was the BASF label. One single they recorded for the label was "Ich fand eine Hand" which was released in 1971.

== Early career ==
Gusenberger and Berger started singing together in 1965, and were married in 1967. They signed a recording contract in 1969, with singles being regularly issued, notably "Der Hund von Baskerville", an unlikely cover version of Black Sabbath's "Paranoid" which has become a collector's curiosity. Their most successful period came between 1972 and 1975 when they placed eight singles on the West German chart, including their biggest hit "Immer wieder Sonntags" which reached #3.

== Eurovision Song Contest ==
Cindy and Bert's first attempt to represent (West) Germany at Eurovision came in 1972, when "Geh' die Straße" finished in second place in the national selection. The following year they performed two songs in the final, but could only manage eighth and ninth place. They got their chance in 1974 when, unusually for Germany by internal selection, their song "Die Sommermelodie" was chosen as the country's entry for the 19th Eurovision Song Contest, held in Brighton, England, on 6 April. "Die Sommermelodie" had been considered a particularly weak song choice by German observers. It also happened to have been chosen for a contest which featured a number of already internationally established performers (Olivia Newton-John, Gigliola Cinquetti, Mouth and MacNeal), and launched the winning group ABBA into global superstardom, so its poor showing – one of four songs to share last place – did not come as a surprise. Cindy and Bert entered the German selection again in 1978, their two songs finishing fourth and fifth.

== Later career ==
Cindy and Bert divorced in 1988, with Cindy starting a solo career as Cindy Berger while Bert moved into production. As a soloist, Cindy participated in two further Eurovision selections, in 1988 (finishing second) and 1991 (seventh). The couple reunited in the mid-1990s and began performing on the nostalgia circuit in addition to releasing new material. Cindy continues to release solo material, her latest album being Von Zeit zu Zeit in 2008.

== Charting singles ==
(Indicates highest position on German Singles Chart)

- 1972: "Geh die Straße" (#36)
- 1973: "Immer wieder Sonntags" (#3)
- 1973: "Hallo, Herr Nachbar" (#37)
- 1973: "Ich komm' bald wieder" (#10)
- 1974: "Spaniens Gitarren" (#11)
- 1974: "Aber am Abend (da spielt der Zigeuner)" (#12)
- 1975: "Ich suche einen Schatz" (#36)
- 1975: "Wenn die Rosen erblühen in Malaga" (#13)
- 1979: "Darling" (#37)

Preceded by Gitte with Junger Tag	Germany in the Eurovision Song Contest; 1974	Succeeded by Joy Fleming with Ein Lied kann eine Brücke sein
