= Jigsaw (British band) =

British pop music group

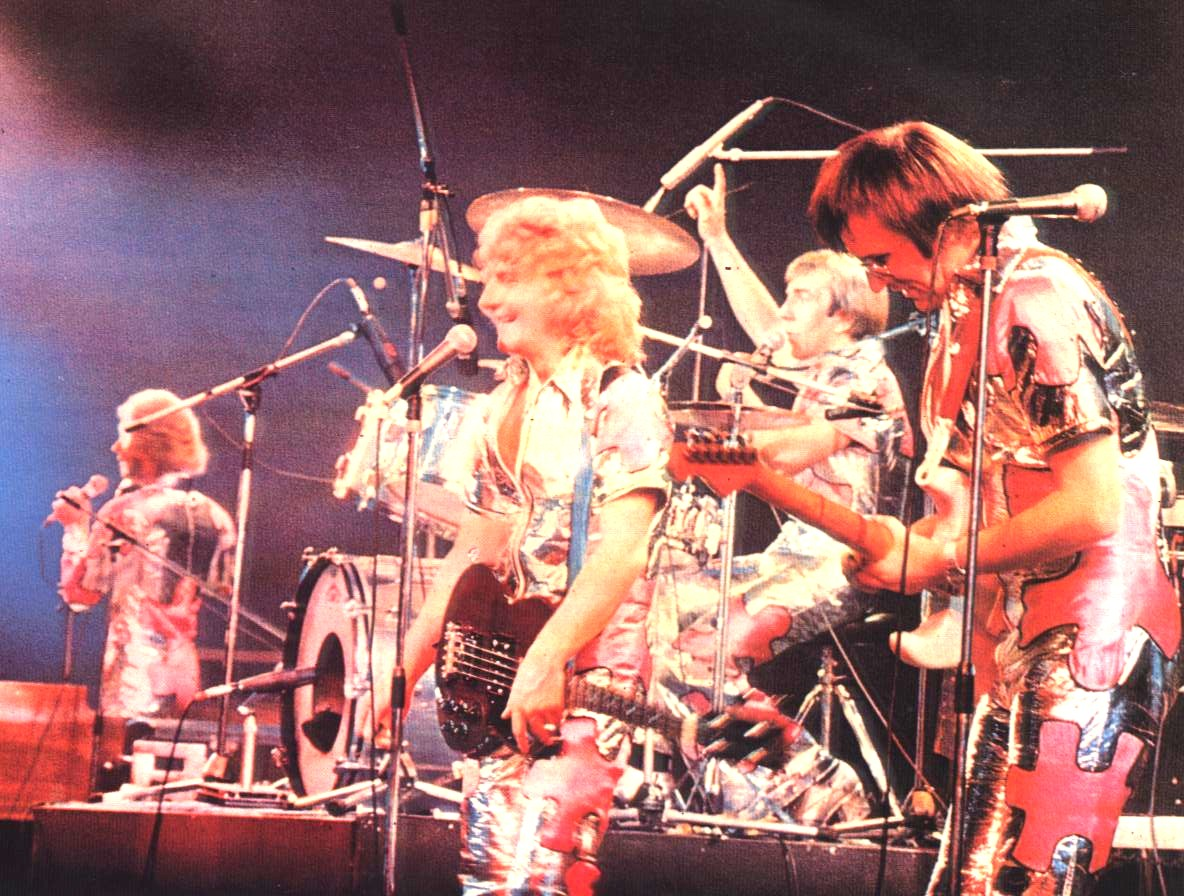
- Jigsaw in Japan during their 1976 tour

Background information
- Also known as: British Jigsaw
- Origin: Coventry and Rugby, England
- Genres: Blues, progressive rock, pop, pop rock, soft rock, disco
- Years active: 1966–1983, 2020
- Label: BASF
- Past members: Biffo Beech; Clive Scott; Barrie Bernard; Tony Campbell; Tony Britnell; Kevin Mahon; Des Dyer; Jon Fox; Rod Godwin; Tim Stone; Pete Dennis; Eric Page

Jigsaw was a British pop rock band best known for their 1975 hit "Sky High". The band was fronted by the singer-songwriter duo of Clive Scott and Des Dyer for most of its life. Following Scott's death in 2009, it has been the platform for Dyer's solo work.

In Australia, the group was called "British Jigsaw" due to the existence of an Australian band of the same name.

== Career ==
Formed as a six-piece in Coventry and Rugby in 1966, Jigsaw's original line-up consisted of Dave "Biffo" Beech (vocals and drums), Clive Scott (keyboards and vocals), Barrie Bernard (bass guitar), Tony Campbell (guitar), Tony Britnell (saxophone) and Kevin "Beppy" Mahon (tenor saxophone). Campbell named the band after Manchester nightclub The Jigsaw Club. Previously, Campbell, Mahon and Beech had worked together in the Mighty Avengers, Bernard had been a member of Pinkerton's Assorted Colours, and Britnell had worked with the Fortunes.

Their style initially bore more resemblance to the blues rock than the pop rock they would later become known for. In 1967, Beech was replaced on drums by Des Dyer, who also took over lead vocals. In 1970, the group was invited to be the backing band for Arthur Conley on his European tour. The band accepted, but Mahon declined and soon left the band. Britnell departed at some point later, leaving Campbell, Bernard, Scott and Dyer.

Jigsaw became known for raucous live shows with drum kits set on fire, explosions, fire-eating, and occasional property damage.

In 1970, they released their debut studio album Letherslade Farm on Philips. The album is named after a hideout used by the perpetrators of the Great Train Robbery of 1963. The album is a concept album that serves as a satire of the music industry, and loosely tells a tale of a broken-down pop singer, with various "interview" interludes scattered throughout the project. The single chosen from the album was keyboardist Clive Scott's arrangement of the Johann Sebastian Bach tune, "Jesu, Joy of Man's Desiring". None of these early releases charted.

During the early 1970s, Scott and Dyer, the main songwriters for Jigsaw, had a hit song with "Who Do You Think You Are", recorded by the UK band Candlewick Green in 1974. The song was later covered in the U.S. by Bo Donaldson and the Heywoods, this version making the U.S. charts, and again in 1993 by Saint Etienne. Later the same year, a Jigsaw version of the song appeared on their 1974 album I've Seen the Film, I've Read the Book, but the record failed to perform, and the band were soon dropped by their recording label, BASF.

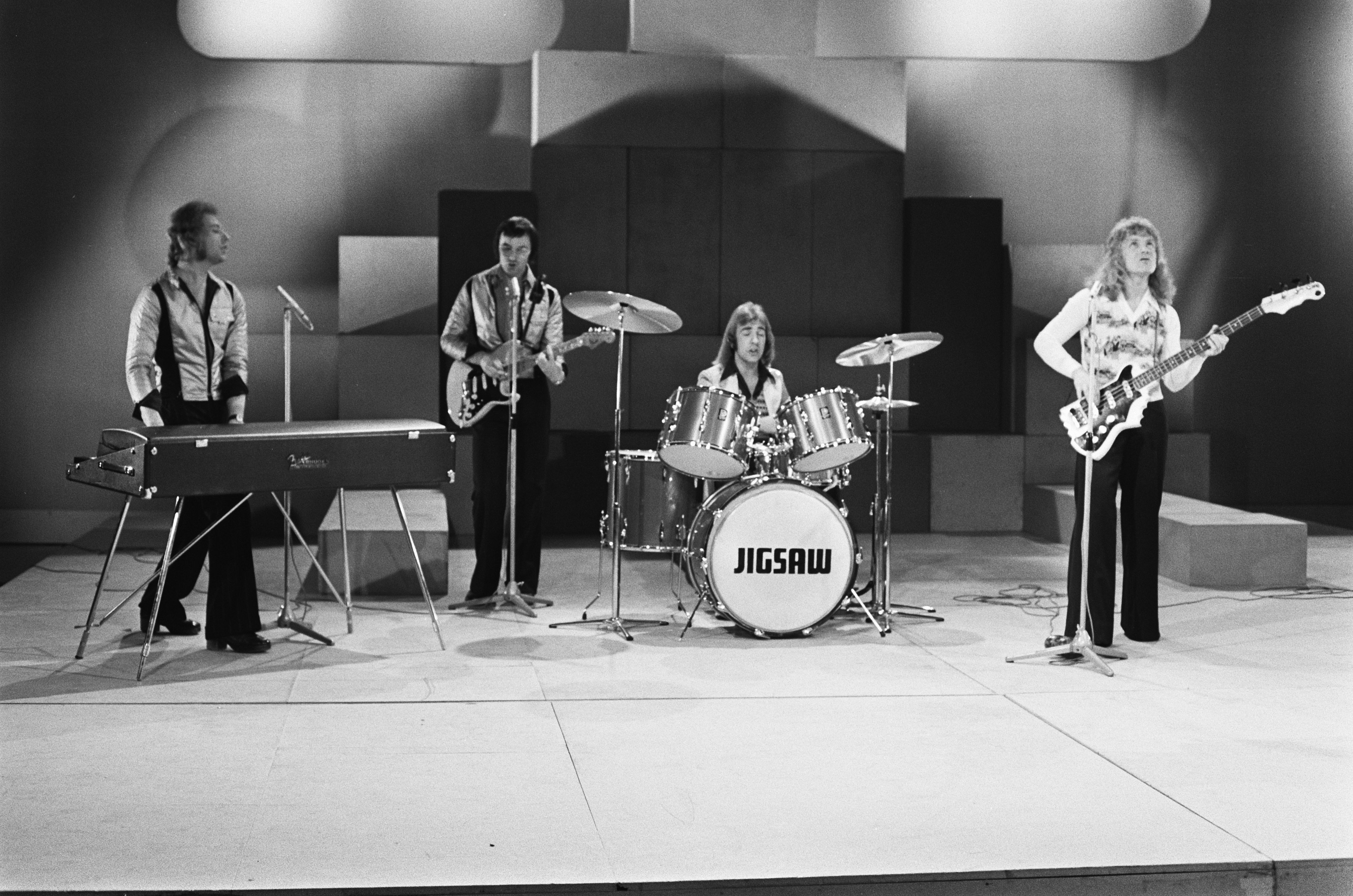
Jigsaw on the Dutch TV programme TopPop on 20 January 1975

Left without a label, Dyer, Scott, and their manager and producer Chas Peate founded Splash Records. Their first single at the new label, titled "Sky High", was recorded for the film The Man from Hong Kong (also known as The Dragon Lies), a 1975 martial-arts action film starring George Lazenby. The single unexpectedly grew from a modest success on Radio Luxembourg to the UK top 10 in November 1975.

Internationally, the song also made waves; the recording was licensed to Chelsea Records in the United States where it reached No. 3 on the Billboard Hot 100, and No. 8 on the Adult Contemporary chart.

Most surprisingly, the song peaked at No. 2 on the Japan Oricon sales chart. A famous Mexican wrestler, Mil Máscaras, used "Sky High" as his theme tune, walking to the ring with the song playing in the background. His popularity in Japan helped "Sky High" to become a hit twice over in that country in consecutive years.

"Sky High" was followed by more singles and a new album, titled Pieces of Magic, but these failed to establish themselves, apart from a brief stint in the UK top 40 in 1977 with "If I Have to Go Away".

Their next brush with fame would come in 1979, when they were offered the chance to write the soundtrack for the controversial film Home Before Midnight. They later released these songs on the film's soundtrack album of the same name.

Founding member Barrie Bernard left the band in 1978, and by the early 1980s, the band ceased touring altogether. After several more lineup shuffles, the group recorded one last album for Elektra. A final single under the Jigsaw name was released by Splash in early 1983 called "Love Isn't at Home", after which the group dissolved.

== Post-breakup ==
Following Jigsaw's dissolution, Scott and Dyer continued to be successful songwriters, having their work recorded by Bad Boys Inc, Boyzone, and Bobby Rydell, among others. Though no new Jigsaw studio albums have been issued, eight newly recorded songs were included on a 1995 compilation CD titled The Best of Jigsaw, and Dyer has sporadically revived the Jigsaw name for solo releases in recent years.

Des Dyer has twice attempted to represent the UK at Eurovision, taking part in the 1983 and 1985 A Song for Europe competitions. In 1983, he placed third as lead singer of the group Casablanca with the song "With Love". Two years later, as a soloist, he took "Energy" to fourth place. In 1988, Dyer provided backing vocals at the Eurovision final alongside Julie Forsyth and Dominic Grant, both formerly of Guys 'n' Dolls, for the UK entry performed by Scott Fitzgerald, "Go". This song placed second in the contest held in Dublin on 30 April. The UK lost by one point to Celine Dion, representing Switzerland with "Ne Partez Pas Sans Moi" ("Don't Leave Without Me").

Clive Scott died in 2009. He is survived by his widow and son.

== Selected discography ==
=== Studio albums ===
- Letherslade Farm (1970) Philips [UK release]
- Aurora Borealis (1972) Philips [UK release]
- Broken Hearted (1973) BASF [UK release]
- I've Seen the Film, I've Read the Book (1974) BASF [UK release]
- Sky High (1975) Splash/Chelsea – AUS No. 93 U.S. No. 55 (track listing differed from country to country)
- Pieces of Magic (1977) Splash/EMI [UK release]
- Jigsaw (1977) 20th Century [US release]
- Journey into Space (1978) Splash/EMI [Japan release]
- 12 Chapters of Love (1980) Splash [Japan release], also released in Spain in 1978 under the title Jigsaw
- Jigsaw (1981) Elektra [US release] (completely different track listing than 1977 LP of the same name)

=== Compilation albums ===
- The Best of Jigsaw (1978) Splash [Sweden release] (LP format only)
- Best Hit 20 (1987) [Japan release]
- The Best of Jigsaw (1995) (including new recordings) (different track listing than 1978 album of the same name)
- Jigsaw (1996) [Brazil release]
- Very Best of Jigsaw (1998) Taragon [US release]
- Soft Rocks (1998) [Japan release]
- Super Best Hits (1999) [Japan release]
- Golden Best (2004) [Japan release]
- Free Soul Drive with Jigsaw (2006) [Japan release]
- The Ultimate Collection (2006) [Japan release]
- Anthology (2007) [US release]
- Greatest Hits - Silver - Sky High (2011) [Japan release]
- Greatest Hits - Gold - Sky High (2011) [Japan release]
- Complete Singles Collection 1968-1981 (3-CD set) (2013) [Japan release]
- Sky High & Rare Tracks - 40th Anniversary Collection (2-CD set) (2017) [Japan release]

=== Singles ===
- "Let Me Go Home" c/w "Tumblin" (1968)
- "One Way Street" (1968)
- "Mister Job" (1970)
- "Keeping My Head Above Water" (1971)
- "Jesu Joy of Man's Desiring" (1971)
- "That's What It's All About" (1973)
- "Lollipop and Goody Man" (1974)
- "I've Seen the Film, I've Read the Book" (1974)
- "You're Not the Only Girl" (1974)
- "Sky High" (1975) – UK No. 9, U.S. No. 3, AUS No. 3, CAN. No. 3
- "Brand New Love Affair" (1976) (originally the B-side to "Sky High") – U.S. No. 66; CAN. No. 85
- "Baby Don't Do It" (1975)
- "Love Fire" (1976) – U.S. No. 30, AUS No. 96, CAN. No. 75
- "Cry 'Til the Tears Run Dry" (1976)
- "If I Have to Go Away" (1977) – UK No. 36, U.S. No. 93
- "Only When I'm Lonely" (1977)
- "Everytime" (1978)
- "Looking for Me" (1979)
- "You Bring Out the Best in Me" (1980)
- "Prizefighter" (1980)
- "I" (1980)
- "No Love Songs" (1981)
- "Love Isn't at Home" (1983)
- "Let's Not Say Goodbye" (1988)
- "Skyhigh" (remake) (1989)
- "Strategy" (1989)
