= Bo Donaldson and The Heywoods =

American pop music group

- Origin: Cincinnati, Ohio, United States
- Genres: Pop, garage rock
- Years active: 1965–1980; 1996–present
- Members: Robert Walter "Bo" Donaldson; Mike Gibbons; David Krock; Rick Joswick; Gary Coveyou; Baker Scott; Richard Brunetti
- Website: Official website

Bo Donaldson and The Heywoods are an American pop music group, known mainly for their 1970s hit singles, "Billy Don't Be a Hero" and "Who Do You Think You Are".

== History ==
The band was formed in Cincinnati, Ohio, in 1965 by their leader, Robert Walter "Bo" Donaldson. Their first singles were released between 1966 and 1968 on a label owned by Bo's mother, Bea Donaldson. Those four singles went largely unnoticed. The band were first discovered while touring with The Osmonds in the early 1970s and signed with Family Productions, releasing their first single in 1972, "Special Someone", but their big break came after moving to ABC Records and working with the record producer Steve Barri in 1973. Although their first single with ABC, "Deeper and Deeper,” failed to make a big impression on the charts, beginning in 1974, the band began a string of hit songs. Their first two (and largest two) hits were cover versions of British hit songs whose original versions had not been hits in the U.S.: "Billy Don't Be a Hero" (a cover of a #1 UK Paper Lace song that reached #1 for 2 weeks on the Hot 100 with the Heywoods version) and "Who Do You Think You Are" (written by Clive Scott & Des Dyer of Jigsaw, which originally became a hit for Candlewick Green and reached #15 on the Hot 100 with the Heywoods version). They were followed by their last top-40 hit, "The Heartbreak Kid" (#39 Hot 100), and their ominously titled last Hot 100 hit, "Our Last Song Together" (#95 on the Hot 100, another UK hit, originally recorded by its songwriter Neil Sedaka). "Billy Don't Be a Hero" sold over three and a half million copies, receiving a gold disc by the R.I.A.A. in June 1974. Despite the song's popularity, many people disliked it, and it was voted #8 on Rolling Stone magazine's readers' poll of "10 Worst Songs of the 1970s."

After their initial popularity, they began a migration across three other record labels as the hits dried up by the end of the decade. In 1975, the band was working on a second album of material for ABC including "Our Last Song Together", released as a single (and which made the pop chart), and "Take Me Make Me Yours", which to this day remains unreleased. Ultimately the group left the label and joined Capitol Records, where they recorded songs by Nicky Chinn and Mike Chapman, the writing/producing team behind the UK act The Sweet, and released the album "Farther On" in 1975. By 1978, they were known as "The Bo Donaldson Band" and eventually split after trying country music with no success in the 1980s. They reformed again in 1996 as a nostalgia act and still make appearances, most notably in the Barry Williams-hosted nostalgia show, Original Idols Live.

In 1996, Varese Vintage Records released Best of Bo Donaldson and the Heywoods, a 15-song compilation of material originally released on Family Productions (1972) and ABC Records (1973–1975). The CD contains all their charted singles and, in fact, includes 9 of the 11 songs featured on the 1974 LP Bo Donaldson and the Heywoods (#97 on the Hot 200). The CD booklet includes liner notes written by Gordon Pogoda and the CD features such highlights as "Who Do You Think You Are", "The House on Telegraph Hill", and "The Heartbreak Kid".

Lead singer and trumpeter Mike Gibbons died on April 2, 2016, at age 71.

== Members ==
- Robert Walter "Bo" Donaldson - keyboards
- Mike Gibbons - lead vocals and trumpet
- David Krock - bass guitar and backing vocalist
- Rick Joswick - lead vocals and tambourine
- Gary Coveyou - saxophone, flute, and backing vocalist
- Baker Scott - guitar (1974)
- Richard Brunetti - drums

== Discography ==
=== Albums ===
- Special Someone (Family, 1972)
- Bo Donaldson & The Heywoods (ABC, 1974) (# 97 Billboard Magazine Hot 200; #106[2] Record World)
- Farther On (Capitol, 1975)
- The Best of Bo Donaldson & The Heywoods (CD, Varèse Sarabande, 1996)

=== Singles ===
- "Special Someone" (U.S. Billboard #64, Cashbox #51, 1972)
- "Deeper and Deeper" (U.S. Cashbox #107, 1974), (U.S. Record World #93, 1974)
- "Billy, Don't Be a Hero" (U.S. #1, AC #20; Canada #1, 1974)
- "Who Do You Think You Are" (U.S. #15, AC #19; Canada #11, Australia #64 1974)
- "The Heartbreak Kid" (U.S. Billboard #39, 1974)(Cashbox # 41; Canada #47)
- "The House on Telegraph Hill" (U.S. Cashbox #89, 1975)
- "Our Last Song Together" (U.S. Billboard #95, 1975)
- "A Fool Like You" (1976)

== See also ==
- List of artists who reached number one in the United States
