= Who Do You Think You Are (Candlewick Green song) =

Single by Candlewick Green

"Who Do You Think You Are?"

Single by Candlewick Green
- B-side: "Fingers in Your Ears"
- Released: 28 December 1973
- Recorded: 1973
- Genre: Pop
- Length: 2:49
- Label: Decca
- Songwriters: Des Dyer; Clive Scott
- Producer: Chas Peate

Candlewick Green singles chronology
"Sunday Kinda Monday" (1973)	"Who Do You Think You Are?" (1973)	"Leave a Little Love" (1974)

"Who Do You Think You Are"

Single by Bo Donaldson and the Heywoods

from the album Bo Donaldson and The Heywoods
- B-side: "Fool's Way of Lovin'"
- Released: July 1974
- Genre: Pop
- Label: ABC
- Songwriters: Des Dyer; Clive Scott
- Producer: Steve Barri

Bo Donaldson and the Heywoods singles chronology
"Billy—Don't Be a Hero" (1974)	"Who Do You Think You Are" (1974)	"The Heartbreak Kid" (1974)

"Who Do You Think You Are?" is a song written by British songwriting-team Des Dyer and Clive Scott. It was first recorded by English pop group Candlewick Green and released in late December 1973. The song peaked at #21 in the United Kingdom in February 1974.

== Candlewick Green version ==
=== Info and background ===
The single had been released in the United States on BASF 19193.

=== Track listings ===
- 7" vinyl - Decca Records
1. "Who Do You Think You Are?" (Dyer, Scott)
2. "Fingers In Your Ears" (Dyer, Scott)

=== Charts ===
Chart (1973–74)	Peak position
UK Singles (OCC)	21

== Bo Donaldson and the Heywoods version ==
Bo Donaldson and the Heywoods covered "Who Do You Think You Are" in 1974. Their version became a hit in both the United States and Canada. It peaked at #15 on the U.S. Billboard Hot 100 and #13 on Cash Box. It was a bigger hit in Canada, where it reached #11. It was also an Adult Contemporary hit in both nations.

=== Track listings ===
- 7" vinyl - ABC Records
1. "Who Do You Think You Are?" (Dyer, Scott)
2. "Fool's Way Of Lovin'" (Michael Price, Dan Walsh)

=== Charts ===
==== Weekly charts ====
Chart (1974)	Peak position
Australia (Kent Music Report)	64
Canada Top Singles (RPM)	11
Canada Adult Contemporary (RPM)	35
US Billboard Hot 100	15
US Adult Contemporary (Billboard)	19
US Cash Box Top 100	13

==== Year-end charts ====
Chart (1974)	Rank
Canada (RPM)	120
US (Joel Whitburn's Pop Annual)	134

== Saint Etienne version ==
"Who Do You Think You Are"

Single by Saint Etienne

from the album You Need a Mess of Help to Stand Alone
- A-side: "Hobart Paving"
- B-side: "Your Head My Voice (Voix Revirement)"
- Released: 11 May 1993
- Genre: Indie pop; alternative dance
- Length: 3:50
- Label: Heavenly – HVN 29; Warner – 9 40910
- Songwriters: Des Dyer; Clive Scott
- Producer: Saint Etienne

Saint Etienne singles chronology
"You're in a Bad Way" (1993)	"Hobart Paving" / "Who Do You Think You Are" (1993)	"Xmas 93" (1993)

Music video
- "Who Do You Think You Are" on YouTube

British indie dance/indie pop band Saint Etienne released an alternative dance-pop arrangement of "Who Do You Think You Are" on their first compilation album, You Need a Mess of Help to Stand Alone (1993). This version featured Debsey Wykes as co-lead vocalist, sometime backing singing for the band and former singer of Dolly Mixture. It peaked at number 23 on the UK Singles Chart as a double A-side with "Hobart Paving".

=== Critical reception ===
Stewart Mason from AllMusic felt that "Who Do You Think You Are" is "one of St. Etienne's most groove-oriented tunes." Larry Flick from Billboard wrote, "English modern-pop act delves into Bo Donaldson & the Heywoods' pop evergreen with fanciful, disco-minded results. Singer Debsey offers a soft, sugar-coated vocal with a pleasant, cushiony house groove resting beneath." He added, "Far more interesting and effective than the group's previous releases." In his weekly UK chart commentary, James Masterton found that it's "a completely new track, a superbly crafted bit of pop which should be Top 10 if there is any justice in the world. We shall see." Taylor Parkes from Melody Maker declared it as "tuppeny-ha' penny Seventies bubblegum dipped in class and delivered deadpan". Damon Albarn and Alex James of Blur reviewed the song for Smash Hits, naming it Best New Single and giving it five out of five. Albarn said, "I like the idea of this. I think they are getting a lot better. I think this is their most complete song. I think the radio will almost certainly play this and it will easily be a Top 20 hit. It's wonderful shopping mall music. It's shopping mall music with attitude. That's what it is."

=== Music video ===
A music video was produced to promote the single. It was later made available on YouTube in May 2012.

=== Track listings ===
All tracks written and composed by Dyer and Scott; except where indicated.

- 7" - Heavenly Records / HVN 29 (UK) (also available on MC (HVN 29C))
1. "Hobart Paving" (Stanley, Wiggs) – 4:54
2. "Who Do You Think You Are" – 3:53
- 12" - Heavenly Records / HVN 29-12 (UK)
1. "Hobart Paving" (Stanley, Wiggs) – 4:54
2. "Your Head My Voice (Voix Revirement)" (Stanley, Wiggs) – 4:12
3. "Who Do You Think You Are" – 3:53
4. "Who Do You Think You Are" (Quex-Rd) – 8:08
- 12" - Heavenly Records / HVN 29-12P (UK) (UK promo. Labelled "Aphex Twin Remixes")
1. "Who Do You Think You Are" (Quex-Rd) – 8:08
2. "Your Head My Voice" (Voix Revirement) (Stanley, Wiggs) – 4:12
- CD - Heavenly Records / HVN 29CD (UK)
1. "Hobart Paving" (Stanley, Wiggs) – 4:54
2. "Who Do You Think You Are" – 3:53
3. "Who Do You Think You Are" (Quex-Rd) – 8:08
4. "Your Head My Voice (Voix Revirement)" (Stanley, Wiggs) – 4:12
- 12" - Warner Bros. Records / 0-40910 (US)
1. "Who Do You Think You Are" (Strobelights & Platform Shoes Mix) – 7:00
2. "Who Do You Think You Are" (Saturday Night Fever Dub) – 6:59
3. "Who Do You Think You Are" (Tilt Dub) – 6:00
4. "Who Do You Think You Are" (Quex-Rd) – 8:08
5. "Who Do You Think You Are" (Nu Solution Mix) – 7:46
6. "Hobart Paving" (UK single version) (Stanley, Wiggs) – 4:54
- 2x12" - Warner Bros. Records / PRO-A-6254 (US) (US 2x12" promo)
1. "Who Do You Think You Are" (Strobelights & Platform Shoes Mix) – 7:00
2. "Who Do You Think You Are" (Saturday Night Fever Dub) – 6:59
3. "Who Do You Think You Are" (Nu Solution Mix) – 7:46
4. "Who Do You Think You Are" (Tilt Dub) – 6:00
1. "Who Do You Think You Are" (Quex-Rd) – 8:08
2. "Your Head My Voice (Voix Revirement)" (Stanley, Wiggs) – 4:12
3. "Who Do You Think You Are" (Radio Remix) – 4:39
4. "Who Do You Think You Are" (Bonus Beats Down) – 4:55
- CD - Warner Bros. Records / 9 40910-2 (US)
1. "Who Do You Think You Are" (Album Version) – 3:52
2. "Who Do You Think You Are" (Strobelights & Platform Shoes Mix) – 7:00
3. "Who Do You Think You Are" (Quex-Rd) – 8:08
4. "Hobart Paving" (UK single version) (Stanley, Wiggs) – 4:54
5. "Who Do You Think You Are" (Nu Solution Mix) – 7:46
6. "Who Do You Think You Are" (Saturday Night Fever Dub) – 6:59
7. "Your Head My Voice (Voix Revirement)" – 4:12
8. "Who Do You Think You Are" (Radio Remix) (Stanley, Wiggs) – 4:39

=== Charts ===
Chart (1993)	Peak position
Europe (Eurochart Hot 100) with "Hobart Paving"	74
UK Singles (OCC)	23
UK Airplay (Music Week)	31
US Hot Dance Club Play (Billboard)	5
US Hot Dance Music/Maxi-Singles Sales (Billboard)	36

== Other cover versions ==
- In 1974, Dyer and Scotts's pop group Jigsaw recorded the song as an album track on their 1974 studio album; I've Seen The Film, I've Read The Book.
- In 1975, Claude François adapted the song into French under the title "On est qui, on est quoi" ("Who are we, what are we").
