= Revelino =

Irish alternative rock band

- Origin: Dublin, Ireland
- Genres: Alternative rock, shoegaze, post-punk,
- Years active: 1994–1996, 2001
- Labels: DiRT Records; Mercenary Records
- Past members: Brendan Tallon; Alan Montgomery; Bren Berry; Ciaran Tallon; Shane Rafferty
- Website: revelino.ie

Revelino was an Irish alternative rock band formed in Dublin, in 1994. They were active from 1994-96 and in early 2001, releasing three albums.

== History ==
Revelino were based on the south side of Dublin, first appearing on the Dublin gig scene in late 1994 with their eponymous first album released on DiRT Records. At the end of 1994, the band was voted into Fanning's Fab 50 for the song "Happiness is Mine". In 2004, the debut album was featured on Hotpress on its list of the 100 Greatest Irish albums.

In 1996, Revelino released their second album, Broadcaster, on DiRT Records. One of its singles, "Step on High", received positive attention from the English DJ John Peel, who gave it airplay and included it in his private collection. While the album was well-received by the Irish music press, it was described as having a "swansong" character, and preceded a seven-year period in which the band ceased performing.

Revelino's final album, To The End, was released in 2001 on Mercenary Records.

A remastered edition of the band's eponymous debut album was released in 2020.

To mark the 25th anniversary of their debut, former members Brendan Tallon and Bren Berry appeared on 2fm with Dan Hegarty in 2019.

== Musical style ==
At the time of Revelino's debut in 1994, their sound was described as somewhere between the walled guitars of the shoegaze era and a 1960’s pop sensibility reminiscent of the La’s.

== Discography ==
Revelino released three studio albums and five singles.

=== Studio albums ===
Year	Details	Peak chart positions
Year	Details	IRL
1994	Revelino: Released: October 1994; Label: DiRT Records	—
1996	Broadcaster: Released: 1996; Label: DiRT Records	—
2001	To The End: Released: 2001; Label: Mercenary Records	—

=== Singles ===
- Happiness Is Mine Single (1995) DiRT Records
- Don't Lead Me Down Single (1995) DiRT Records
- I Know What You Want Single (1996) DiRT Records
- Step On High Single (1996) DiRT Records
- Radio Speaks Single (1997) DiRT Records
