= James Fawn =

- Born: James Simmonds; 1847; Paddington, London, England
- Died: 19 January 1923 (aged 75-76); Lambeth, London, England
- Occupation: Music hall entertainer

James Fawn (born James Simmonds; 1847–19 January 1923) was a British music hall comic entertainer, popular towards the end of the 19th century when he was often billed as 'The Prince of the Red Nosed Comedians'. His best known song was "Ask a P'liceman".

== Biography ==
He was born in Paddington, London, in about 1847, as James Simmonds, the son of a tailor, Henry Simmonds. He first worked as a stage actor, and then as a comedian, in the mid-1870s, and regularly worked in pantomime with Arthur Roberts. The two sang duets, alternating verses.

Fawn developed a reputation as one of the best impersonators of a drunken person. Dressed in top hat and tails, he would pretend to be drunk and parody the "leisured classes", hiccuping as he sang. One of his most popular lines was to claim that "... it must have been the lobster I've eaten as I've hardly drunk enough to drown a fly!".

His most successful routine, "Ask a P'liceman", sometimes given as "If You Want to Know the Time Ask A Policeman", was first performed in 1888 and was written by E. W. Rogers and A. E. Durandeau. The song was "filled with references that reflected the Victorian working-class mistrust of the officers of the law", and made fun of the frequent claim that, if arrested for drunkenness, one's pocket watch was likely to go missing at the police station, with the line "Every member of the force / Has a watch and chain, of course." The sheet music of the song reportedly sold some half a million copies within three years of its publication.

He performed over 150 songs during his career. His other songs included "The House that Jerry Built", and "Not Wanted". Fawn performed at Gatti's Charing Cross Music Hall in 1890, and it has been suggested that that is the occasion on which Rudyard Kipling based his story My Great and Only, in which the narrator (based on Kipling himself) presents a song he has written to a leading performer looking for new material.

Fawn died in 1923, and a report at the time described him as having "a juicy kind of humour... [who] left the broader kind of salacity" to others such as Arthur Roberts.

He was married to Emily Margaret Norrington in 1866; they had a daughter. After his wife's death, he married Emily Ash (née Tomlin) in 1891.
