= E. W. Rogers =

English music hall songwriter

Edward William Rogers (1864– 21 February 1913) was an English songwriter for music hall performers of the late 19th and early 20th centuries.

== Biography ==
He was born in Newington, London, and in the 1880s started appearing on the music hall stage in sketches written by singer and songwriter Harry Pleon (1856–1911). He came to recognise that he was a better songwriter than performer, and first found success in 1888 when his song "Ask a P'liceman", with music by A. E. Durandeau, was taken up by comedian and singer James Fawn. Within three years, the song reportedly sold half a million copies as sheet music. Rogers and Durandeau also wrote Charles Coborn's 1890 song "Come Where the Booze Is Cheaper".

Rogers found further success when his 1890 song "Hi-Tiddley-Hi-Ti", with music by George Le Brunn, was performed by Charles Godfrey. In 1891, he began working as an accompanist to George Robey, initially without Robey realising that he was a successful songwriter. Rogers began writing some of Robey's songs, including "The Simple Pimple", and monologues. He also wrote material for Vesta Tilley, including her successful song "Following in Father's Footsteps" in 1902. Tilley commented on Rogers' prodigious output of material: "It was a rare thing not to see Rogers at my home in London every day with a batch of new numbers. He turned them out so quickly, and they were all more or less successful." He also wrote for other performers including Florrie Forde, Marie Lloyd, Tom Costello, Arthur Lennard, and Alec Hurley, for whom he wrote the original "Lambeth Walk" (not the 1937 Noel Gay song of the same name).

Rogers died in Wandsworth in 1913, aged 49.
