= Al Ferrier =

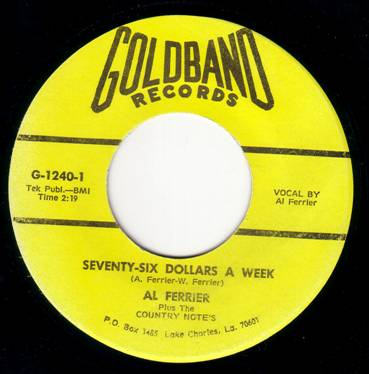
"Seventy-Six Dollars a Week", 1970

Alfous Glenn "Al" Ferrier, Sr. (born August 19, 1935 in Olla, Louisiana; died January 6, 2015 in Natchitoches, Louisiana) was an American musician playing country, Cajun and rockabilly music.

== Discography ==
=== Singles ===
Year	Title	Label
1956	"No No Baby" / "I'll Never Do Any Wrong"	Goldband Records
1956	"My Baby Done Gone Away" / "It's Too Late Now"	Goldband Records
1957	"I'm The Man" / "Hey Baby"	Excello Records
1958	"Let's Go Boppin' Tonight" / "What Is That Thing Called Love?"	Goldband Records
1959	"Kiss Me Baby" / "I Thought I Found Love"	Rocko Records
1959	"Chisholm Trail Rock" / "Gunsmoke"	Zynn Records
1960	"Blues Stop Knocking" / "She Left Me"	Zynn Records
1964	"78 To Birmingham" / "I'll Sin Until I Die"	Goldband Records
1964	"Last Chance" / "Take Two Steps"	Goldband Records
1970	"Honey Baby" / "Why Doubt My Love?"	Goldband Records
1970	"I'll Try One More Time"' / "I'm Just A Mender"	Goldband Records
1970	"Told Her No No Baby" / "Touch Of Mary's Hand"	Goldband Records
1970	"Yard Dog" / "If I Need You"	Goldband Records
1970	"Seventy-Six Dollars A Week" / "Hungry Eyes"	Goldband Records
1972	"163 St. Peter's Call" / "All You Need Is A Man"	RPI Records
1974	"I'm Not Drinking More" / "Don't Play Blue Eyes"	Master Track Records
1975	"Kiss Me Baby" / "I Thought I Found Love"	Rocko Records
1975	"I'll Take You For A Ride" / "It's My Fault"	Showtime Records
1975	"Be-Boppin' Daddy" / "You're Humburggin' Me"	Showtime Records
1976	"Lonesome Trucker" / "Watching The Might Lights Burn"	Showtime Records
1976	"Hey Baby" / "Honey"	Showtime Records
1976	"Hey Baby" / "I'm The Man"	Excello Records
1981	"Hello Josephine" / "I'll Try One More Time"	Goldband Records
1981	"Every Dog Has a Day" / "No Greater Love"	Goldband Records
1986	"Rockabilly Blues" / "Sad Songs Help Me Through The Night"	Goldband Records
	"Blues Stop Knocking At My Door"; "Indian Rock and Roll"; "Send Her Back"; "You Win Again"	not published
	"Love Me Baby"; "I'm Still Loving You"	not published

=== Albums ===
Year	Title	Label
1970	The Birth Of Rockabilly	
1976	From 1955 To 1975	
1977	Boppin’ Tonight	
1981	Al Ferrier	
1984	Bop Stop Rock In The Hole In The Wall	
1987	Dixie	
1993	Al Ferrier and his Boppin’ Hillbillies	
1996	Legendary Al Ferrier with Louisiana Swamp Cats	
1996	Help Me Keep The Faith	
2000	Al Ferrier & Louisiana Swamp Cats	
