= Jack Pleasants =

English comedian and singer (1874–1924)

- Born: Squire Pleasants; 27 August 1874; Bradford, West Riding of Yorkshire, England
- Died: 2 January 1924 (aged 49); Bradford, West Yorkshire, England
- Occupation(s): Music hall comedian and singer
- Years active: 1901–1924
- Known for: I'm 21 Today; I'm Shy, Mary Ellen, I'm Shy
- Spouse: Jessie (maiden name unknown) (?–1924, Pleasants's death)

Jack Pleasants (born Squire Pleasants; 27 August 1874 – 2 January 1924) was an English music hall comedian and singer.

== Life and career ==
Jack Pleasants was born in Bradford, West Riding of Yorkshire, England in 1874. After entering a talent contest in Leeds, he had his first music hall appearances there. He made his London debut in 1901, but was not an immediate success and returned to provincial theatres for several years, gradually increasing his popularity in the north of England. In 1907, he appeared with George Mozart in pantomime in Bradford.

From then his status as one of the top Northern dialect comedians grew. Billed as “The Bashful Limit”, he typically played the part of a "bashful fool", whose ostensible lack of experience with women could turn out to reveal hidden purpose. He wore make-up, a black frock coat, trousers, and a bowler hat, and sported a large marguerite flower.

He popularised the songs “I’m Twenty-One Today” and “I’m Shy, Mary Ellen, I’m Shy”, which remain the songs for which he is best remembered.

== Death ==
Jack Pleasants died in 1924 aged forty-nine. He died of a perforated appendix after an evening pantomime performance of Little Red Riding Hood at the Prince's Theatre, Bradford. One source suggests that Pleasants dropped dead on stage, and that he had been only "subbing" for Arthur Lucan and Kitty McShane of Old Mother Riley fame.

The pantomime began to seem jinxed. The 7 February 1924 edition of Variety carried the following report:

"Francis Laidler's pantomime at Prince's Theatre, Bradford is having a particularly unhappy time. First, the principal comedian, Jack Pleasants, died shortly after the production opened, and now the principal girl, Winifred O'Connor, has been nearly burned to death. She was shampooing her hair with spirit mixture assisted by her mother when the stuff caught fire, setting the room ablaze. The screams of the two women brought their landlord to the room, and he flung a carpet over them. Winifred O'Connor was so seriously burned that it will be some time before she can return to work."

Pleasants's widow, Jessie, lived in London and died just after World War II.

== Trivia ==
Both Will Fyffe and Sandy Powell began their careers by doing impressions of Jack Pleasants and other music hall performers.
