= Freddy Breck =

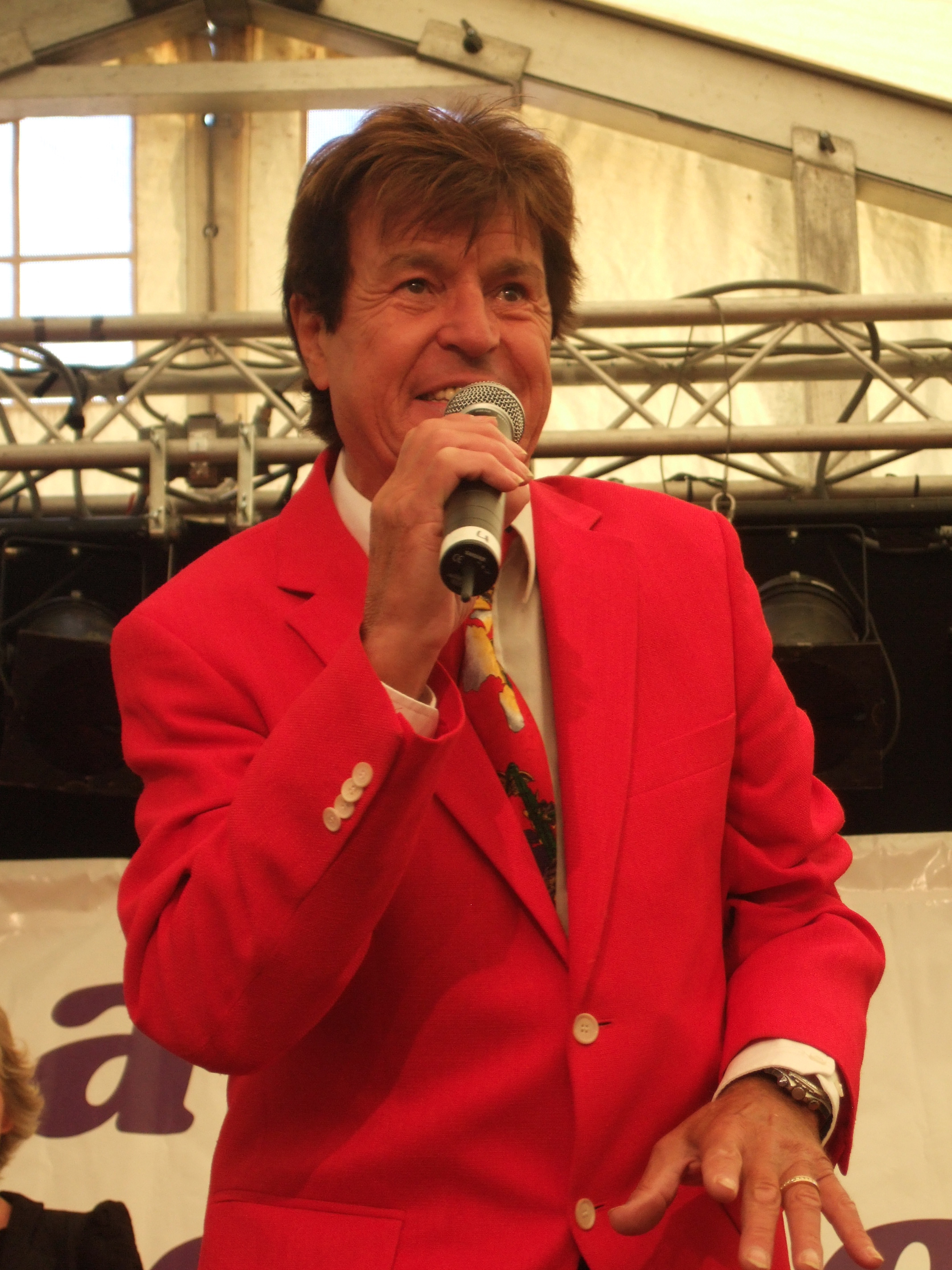

Background information
- Born: Sonneberg, Germany
- Occupation: Singer
- Labels: BASF, Cornet, Polydor, RCA Victor

Freddy Breck (Gerhard Breker; 21 January 1942 – 17 December 2008) was a German schlager singer, composer, record producer, and news anchor.

Breck was born in Sonneberg, Thuringia. He studied to be a machinist, then studied singing under Heinz Gietz. He sang schlager songs which were based on well-known classical melodies. His first success was "Überall auf der Welt", based on Va, pensiero from Giuseppe Verdi's Nabucco. This he recorded in English as "We Believe in Tomorrow" and released it as a single in late 1972 - it topped the South African Charts in early 1973. He went on to score 5 platinum records and 35 gold records over the course of his career.

In 1978, he issued an English language disc. In the 1980s, he worked as a news presenter for various stations, and wrote music for groups such as the Original Naabtal Duo, the Kastelruther Spatzen and Nina & Mike. He founded his own record label, Sun Day Records, with his wife Astrid in 1998, and in 1999 they released music as a duo, Astrid & Freddy Breck.

Breck died of cancer, in Rottach-Egern, Upper Bavaria, in December 2008.

== Discography ==
- 1973 Rote Rosen für dich
- 1974 Die Welt ist voll Musik
- 1975 Mit einem bunten Blumenstrauß
- 1977 Die Sterne steh’n gut
- 1977 Mach was Schönes aus diesem Tag
- 1978 Sommerliebe
- 1978 Years of love
- 1981 Melodien zum Verlieben
- 1982 Meine Lieder, meine Träume
- 1985 Deutschlands schönste Volkslieder (und die Sonntagskinder)
- 1991 Für Dich
- 1992 Mein leises Du
- 1995 So wie ich bin
- 1997 Ich liebe Dich
- 2004 Wir zwei
- Weihnachten mit Freddy Breck

== Singles ==
- 1972 "Überall auf der Welt", based on Giuseppe Verdi's Nabucco
- 1973 "Bianca", based on Tchaikovsky's Capriccio Italien
- 1973 "Rote Rosen", in English version Love and Roses, based on Franz von Suppé's Dichter und Bauer
- 1974 "Halli, Hallo"
- 1974 "Die Sonne geht auf"
- 1974 "Mit einem bunten Blumenstrauß"
- 1975 "Der große Zampano"
- 1976 "Das ist die wahre Liebe"
- 1976 "Der weiße Flieder"
- 1977 "Die Sterne steh’n gut"
- 1977 "Im Schatten der alten Kastanie"
- 1977 "Überall, wo die Meisjes sind"
- 1978 "Mach was Schönes aus diesem Tag"
- 1978 "Amigo Perdido"
- 1979 "Mädchen"
- 1981 "Frauen und Wein"
- 1986 "Monica", based on Johann Strauss junior's waltz Wiener Blut
- 1991 "Herz Ass ist Trumpf"

=== Chart positions ===
- "Überall auf der Welt"

Germany: 7
Netherlands: 7

- "Bianca"

Germany: 2
Belgium: 1
Netherlands: 3
Austria: 11
Switzerland: 4

- "Rote Rosen"

Germany: 2
Netherlands: 1
Austria: 7
Switzerland: 9

- "Halli, hallo"

Germany: 21
Netherlands: 13

- "So in Love with You"

UK: 44

- "Die Sonne geht auf"

Germany: 31
Netherlands: 13

- "Mit einem bunten Blumenstrauß"

Netherlands: 24

- "Der große Zampano"

Germany: 16
Netherlands: 19

- "Das ist die wahre Liebe"

Germany: 47

- "Die Sterne steh'n gut"

Germany: 48
