= Arcadian Serenaders =

1920s band

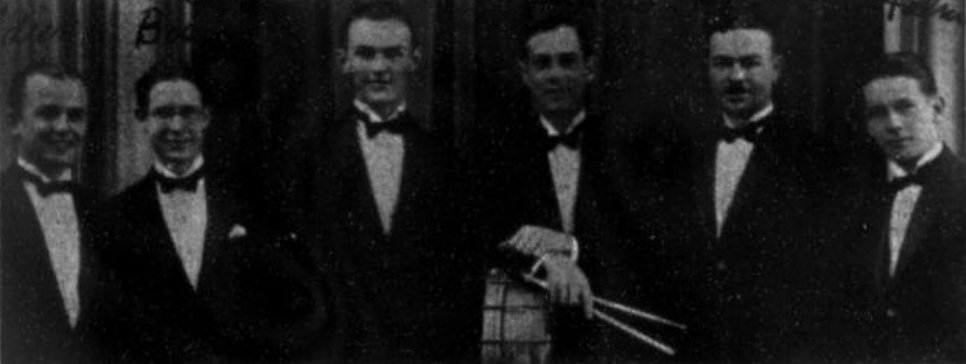
The Arcadian Serenaders in 1925

The Arcadian Serenaders, named Original Crescent City Jazzers before, were a band of white musicians from New Orleans during the 1920s. They performed in the Arcadian Ballroom in St. Louis.

The band's members were

- Sterling Bose (cornet)
- Felix Guarino (drums),
- Slim Hall (banjo),
- Chick Harvey (vocals),
- Cliff Holman (clarinet, alto saxophone),
- Marty Livingston (vocals),
- Avery Loposer (trombone, vocals),
- Wingy Manone (cornet)
- Bob Marvin (banjo) and
- Johnny Riddick (piano).

== Discography ==
Compilations

- Arcadian Serenaders: The Complete Sets. 1924-1925, 2001
