= Johnny Fortune =

Irish rugby union player

- Full name: John Joseph Fortune
- Born: 1 December 1933 Dublin, Ireland
- Died: 28 September 2015 (aged 81) Balbriggan, Co. Dublin, Ireland

Rugby union career
- Position: Wing
International career
Years	Team	Apps	(Points)
1963–64	Ireland	2	(3)

John Joseph Fortune (1 December 1933 – 28 September 2015) was an Irish international rugby union player.

Fortune was born in Dublin to parents from Enniscorthy.

A winger, Fortune played his rugby for Clontarf and Leinster, with two Ireland caps. He made his debut against the All Blacks at Lansdowne Road in 1963 and scored the match's opening try, which would have given Ireland the win but for a late penalty goal by Don Clarke. His other cap came against England at Twickenham in the 1964 Five Nations.

Fortune worked at ESB and lived for 40 years in the town of Balbriggan near Dublin.

== See also ==
- List of Ireland national rugby union players
