= Candlewick Green =

English pop group

Candlewick Green were a five-piece English pop group, formed in the 1970s. It is best known for its song "Who Do You Think You Are" (1973), also recorded by artists such as Jigsaw and Bo Donaldson and The Heywoods. The group's name is an allusion to children's TV animation series Camberwick Green.

After winning the television talent show Opportunity Knocks, Candlewick Green signed to Decca Records, and had a hit single with the song "Who Do You Think You Are?", written by Des Dyer and Clive Scott of the band Jigsaw. The tune reached no. 21 on the UK Singles Chart in early 1974. Both Bo Donaldson and The Heywoods and Saint Etienne later covered "Who Do You Think You Are".

Keyboardist Andy Ball left in the autumn of 1975 to join Mud for a two-year stint, latterly as a touring member only. With varying line-ups, Candlewick Green continued performing until the early 2000s, before finally retiring from the international stage.

== Members ==
- Alan Leyland (drums)
- Andy Ball (keyboards)
- Lennie Cogswell (guitar)
- Jimmy Nunnen (bass, backing vocals)
- Terry Webb (lead vocals)
- Derek Cleary (guitar, backing vocals)
- Dudley Jones
- Stevie Bee (bass, keyboard)
- Cy O'Hara (trumpet, guitar)
- Kjartan Poskitt (early 1980s)
- Peter La Scalla (early 1980s)
- Jacqui Munro (early 1980s)
- Trevor Ashforth Duo (early 1980s)

== Discography ==
=== Albums ===
- What Kind of Songs (Decca Records, 1974)
- Candlewick Green (Storm Records, 1977)
- 'Makin It' (SRT Productions) 1980

=== Singles ===
- "Doggie" (1972), BASF
- "Sunday Kinda Monday" (1973), Decca
- "Who Do You Think You Are?" (1973), Decca, UK no. 21
- "Everyday of My Life" (1974), BASF
- "Leave A Little Love" (1974), Decca
- "Last Bus Home" (1975), Buk Records
- "Sign of the Times" (1976), Buk Records
