= Pocket FishRmen =

Punk rock band from Austin, Texas

- Origin: Austin, Texas
- Genres: Punk rock
- Years active: 1986–2000, 2007–present
- Labels: Austin Throwdown; Saustex Media
- Members: Brant Bingamon; Lance Farley; Jason Craig; Cris Burns
- Past members: Ron Williams; Marcus Trejo; Snoopy Melvin

Pocket FishRmen is an underground punk rock band from Austin, Texas, originally active from 1986 to 2000.

The band's founding members were vocalist Brant Bingamon, guitarist Cris Burns, bassist Ron Williams, and drummer Marcus Trejo. In 1988, they released the debut "Amy Carter". In 1991, Trejo was replaced by Snoopy Melvin, and soon afterwards, Williams was replaced by Jason Craig. Their debut studio album, Future Gods of Rock, was released in 1993. In 1997, they released the album Heroes of Modern Perversion, followed by Simian Dreams the following year. They broke up in 2000, performing their final show on May 13 of that year in the Red Eyed Fly in Austin. Following the death of British DJ John Peel in 2004, it was revealed that he had kept a collection of favourite records separately, now known as John Peel's Record Box. Amongst the records, the Pocket FishRmen single "Yr story" was included. The selection was the subject of a 2005 documentary. The band reunited in 2007 with Lance Farley as their new drummer and released multiple new studio albums, including Rocko's Not Feeling Well in 2014. In 2017, they released the greatest-hits album The Greatest Story Ever Told on Saustex Media.

== Discography ==
- Future Gods of Rock (1993)
- Heroes of Modern Perversion (1997)
- Simian Dreams (1998)
- The Secret Code of Rock (2010)
- Rocko's Not Feeling Well (2014)
- The Greatest Story Ever Told (2017)
- We Are Masters of These Levels (2021)
