= Ask a P'liceman =

Song by James Fawn
- Published: 1888
- Composer(s): A. E. Durandeau
- Lyricist(s): E. W. Rogers

"Ask a P'liceman" (sometimes given as "If You Want to Know the Time Ask a Policeman") is a music hall song. It was first performed in 1888 by English comedian James Fawn and was written by Edward William Rogers (1864–1913) and Augustus Edward Durandeau (1848–1893).

Fawn was known as one of the best comedic impersonators of a drunken person. The song was "filled with references that reflected the Victorian working-class mistrust of the officers of the law", and made fun of the frequent claim that, if arrested for drunkenness, one's pocket watch was likely to go missing at the police station, with the line "Every member of the force / Has a watch and chain, of course." The sheet music of the song reportedly sold some half a million copies within three years of its publication.

The song's title was used for Will Hay's 1939 comedy film Ask a Policeman.
