= Hamilton Hill (singer) =

Australian Singer

- Born: Thomas Henry Christopher Hill; 14 August 1871; Gordon, Victoria, Australia
- Died: 26 June 1910 (aged 38); Los Angeles, California, U.S.
- Occupation: Singer
- Years active: 1890s–1910

Thomas Henry Christopher Hill (14 August 1871 – 26 June 1910), known as Hamilton Hill, was an Australian baritone singer and music hall performer who also worked in Britain and the United States.

== Life and career ==
Hill was born in Gordon, near Ballarat in Victoria, Australia, the son of John Hill and his wife Lucy (née Hamilton). He took his mother's maiden name when he started to perform, and first appeared on stage in Perth, Western Australia, in the early 1890s as support to Charles Godfrey. He then joined Henry Bracy's opera company, before having a spell touring with Harry Rickards.

In 1899 he married popular dancer Robina "Beanie" Galletly (1881–1935). They travelled to San Francisco, and he found work there at the Orpheum opera house. He toured the United States successfully for three years, before moving on again, to London, making his debut at the Empire Theatre in Leicester Square. He was again a success, and toured Britain, where one of his most popular songs was "Goodbye, Dolly Gray", though he was not the first to record it. He was known for his patriotic songs, and made a number of recordings, including "Bluebell", "Starlight", "A Little Boy Called Taps", and "Somebody's Sailor Boy". He recorded for several companies, including The Gramophone Co. and Zonophone.

In 1906 he returned to the United States, where he toured for the B. F. Keith theatre circuit, and recorded for Victor and Columbia Records. He died in Los Angeles in 1910 at the age of 38, and was buried in Angelus-Rosedale Cemetery.
