= Johnny Hamp's Kentucky Serenaders =

Johnny Hamp's Kentucky Serenaders was a US jazz and dance band, active from the late 1910s through the 1920s. The group was known simply as The Serenaders until Johnny Hamp became the band leader. Johnny Hamp was born in Lancaster, Pennsylvania, and should not be confused with British television producer Johnnie Hamp.

According to some sources, he became the band's leader by chance when the band was performing at the Hershey Ballroom in Hershey, Pennsylvania. The band leader at the time had an argument with the players and walked out. Hamp, who never played a musical instrument in spite of being a jazz fan and had no experience as a conductor (in addition, he only sang whenever the chorus was performed by a vocal ensemble or the whole band), volunteered to lead them for the rest of the evening and they accepted. After the performance, the band asked him to stay on as leader.

The "Kentucky" in the name appears to be related to the band's use of "My Old Kentucky Home" as a theme song, rather than any connection to the U.S. state of Kentucky. The group toured in the eastern United States and toured England in 1930. In 1931, the group was renamed Johnny Hamp and His Orchestra. The group made most of its recordings in New York City on the Victor label. Their biggest hit was "Black Bottom" recorded in 1926, which led to a dance fad; see Black Bottom (dance).

Hamp continued to record for Victor until April 1932. The next session was in August 1935 for ARC (Melotone, Perfect, Romeo, Oriole). In December, 1936, Hamp was back with Victor recording for their Bluebird label for only two sessions (the second in February, 1937), which turned out to be their last session. Johnny Hamp led other bands in the 1930s and early 1940s ending up as a hotel house band leader in Chicago.

Band members at different times included:

- Howard Bartlett on clarinet, soprano saxophone, tenor saxophone, vocals
- William Benedict on trombone
- Lester Brewer on trumpet
- Charles Buckwalter on piano, vocals and as arranger
- Franklyn Baur on vocals
- Joe Cassidy on clarinet, alto saxophone, vocals
- Roy Cropper on vocals
- Charles Dale on clarinet, soprano saxophone, alto saxophone
- Cliff Gamet on alto saxophone, vocals
- Carl Grayson (r.n.: Graub) on violin, vocals
- Elwood Groff on bass brass, vocals
- Irwin Hood on piano
- Lewis James on vocals
- Johnny Marvin on vocals
- Johnny McAfee on saxophone, vocals
- Frank Masterson on banjo, vocals
- Frank Munn on vocals
- Billy Murray on vocals
- Walter Pontius on vocals
- Elliot Shaw on vocals
- Charles Socci on guitar, vocals
- Ray Stillson on clarinet, soprano saxophone, alto saxophone
- John Strouse on drums
- Clayton Tewkesbury on trumpet
- Hal White on violin, vocals
- Jayne Whitney on vocals
- Melvin Watkins playing clarinet and saxophone

== Partial discography ==
- "Breeze Blow My Baby Back" 1919
- "Angry" 1925
- "Black Bottom" 1926 (see 1926 in music)
- "If I Had a Talking Picture of You" 1929 (see 1929 in music)
- "Venetian Moon" (released on 78 RPM by Columbia records)

The first reference below has a detailed discography.
