= The Mighty Avengers (band) =

Pop Group

The Mighty Avengers was an English pop group, formed by Tony Campbell in 1962 at Rugby, England.

== History ==
The group was managed by Danny Betesh of Kennedy Street Artistes. He negotiated a recording deal with Andrew Loog Oldham, who at the same time, also managed The Rolling Stones. Mick Jagger and Keith Richards wrote the group's only hit, "So Much in Love", which spent two weeks in the UK Singles Chart, reaching number 46 at the end of 1964. The song fared better in Australia, reaching number 22.

The group released several more singles, including "Hide Your Pride and "Blue Turns To Grey" which all failed to chart. The band split up in the mid-1960s, though several members later joined the group Jigsaw, which had several chart hits in the mid-1970s.

== Band members ==
- Tony Campbell (lead guitar, vocal)
- Dave "Biffo" Beech (drums, vocal)
- Mike Linnell (bass, lead vocal)
- Kevin "Bep" Mahon (guitar, harmonica)

== Later ==
In June 2011, their former band member, Mike Linnell, appeared as a contestant on the Channel 4 game show, Countdown.
