= There Is Some Fun Going Forward =

There is Some Fun Going Forward

Compilation album by various artists
- Released: 1972
- Genre: Progressive rock, folk rock
- Label: Dandelion Records (UK); See For Miles (CD re-release)
- Producer: Various

There is Some Fun Going Forward is the only sampler album released by John Peel's Dandelion Records label, and was marketed by Polydor. As one might expect from Peel, the artists featured were not necessarily mainstream, and in fact, the only artists featured who enjoyed chart success are Clifford T. Ward and Medicine Head. The sleeve featured a photo of Peel in the bath with a naked (or at least visibly topless) woman. It was re-released in 1995 by See For Miles as a CD with extra tracks.

== Track listing ==
=== Side One ===
1. "Only to do What is True" (Fiddler) - Medicine Head
2. "Anticipation" (Ward) - Clifford T. Ward
3. "Pretty Little Girl" (Coxhill) - Coxhill-Bedford Band
4. "Nell's Song" (Hart) - Mike Hart
5. "All Ends Up" (Milne) - Tractor

=== Side Two ===
6. "Fly High" (St John-Stevenson) - Bridget St John
7. "Sky Dance" (Midgeley) - John Trevor
8. "Mama Keep Your Big Mouth Shut" (E. McDaniel) - Stackwaddy
9. "The Colour is Blue" (Savage) - Country Sun
10. "Sand All Yellow" (Coyne-Clague-Cudworth) - Kevin Coyne

== Extra tracks on CD rerelease ==
11. "Vorblifa Exit" - Lol Coxhill
12. "Fetch Me My Woman" - Siren
13. "War Is Over" - Siren
14. "Autumn Lady Dancing" - Principal Edwards Magic Theatre
15. "Early Morning Song" - Bridget St. John
16. "Sleeping Town" - Beau
17. "Girl From Ipanema" - Stackwaddy
