= Rossini Hayward =

Rossini Hayward (born October 25, 1981) is a classical guitarist, composer and arranger. He has released four CDs and published numerous works predominantly for solo guitar with Ut Orpheus and Edition Margaux. He has recorded under the label NAXOS.

== Early life and education ==
Rossini Hayward was born in London. He studied Engineering Science and St. Anne's College, Oxford, where he was a scholar and graduated in 2005 with a First. It was at Oxford that he took his first guitar lessons with Gilbert Biberian. Subsequently he was awarded a scholarship to study the classical guitar an The Royal Welsh College of Music and Drama with John Mills, where he obtained a BMus. He went on to study a Masters in Music at the Hochschule für Musik Freiburg with Sonja Prunnbauer, graduating in 2012 with the highest honours.

== Recordings ==
=== Pieces of Mind: Classical Guitar Compositions and Arrangements (2018) ===
Rossini's first CD Pieces of Mind was recorded in a church Weston, England with John Taylor. It features a wide range of his arrangements for solo guitar and some of his original compositions.

=== Stille Nacht: Christmas Carols for Guitar (2020) ===
Stille Nacht was recorded with Romin Katzer in his studio in Nürnberg, Germany during the pandemic lockdown between March and June 2020. It comprises Rossini's arrangements of well-known Christmas Carols. In this recording he added overdubbed vocals and percussive effects to several tracks. The recording was released with the label NAXOS and has enjoyed considerable success being streamed millions of times. It has received air time on various radio stations including BBC Radio 3 and ABC Classics.

=== Themes for Dreams (2025) ===
Themes for Dreams is a recording of lullabies for solo guitar. It was recorded in the St. Josef's church in Melkendorf, Germany on 9–10 August 2025. In addition to Rossini's arrangements of well-known lullabies he has included some personal original compositions. A Dream for Eliot is a piece dedicated to his son. Goodnight Klara is dedicated to his wife and won the second prize in the 10th International Fidelio Composition Competition for Guitar.

=== Come Away (2026) ===
Come Away is a recording of songs by John Dowland and Henry Purcell. It features the singer Christina Röckelein and was recorded in St. Josef's church in Melkendorf, Germany. A number of tracks feature Dowland's original four-part vocal harmonies, for which Christina sung the soprano, alto and tenor lines with Rossini singing the bass.

== Selected List of Publications ==
=== Solo guitar ===
- Through Twilight Woods Edition Margaux em1178 (2019)
- Christmas Carols for Guitar Ut Orpheus CH345 (2020)
- Canon in D Ut Orpheus CH364 (2021)
- Prelude and Prayer Edition Margaux em 1188 (2020)
- Being Edition Margaux em1200 (2020)
- Variations on a Lullaby Ut Orpheus CH384 (2023)
- Rheingold Fantasy Edition Margaux em 1211 (2023)
- Leviathan Edition Margaux em 1222 (2024)

=== Guitar quartet ===
- Cantus Maris Morientis em 4043 (2024)

== Teaching ==
Rossini teaches guitar at the University of Bamberg and the Städtische Musikschule Bamberg.
