= Deeply Vale Festivals =

Former series of free festivals

- 1977 poster for the festival
- Genre: Punk rock, rock music
- Location: Bury in northwest England
- Years active: 1976–1979, 1980, 1981, 2015, 2016
- Founders: Chris Hewitt
- Attendance: 20,000+
- Website: Deeply Vale Festival

The Deeply Vale Festivals were free festivals held near Bury in northwest England in 1976, 1977, 1978 and 1979 and at a different site in 1980 and 1981. They are regarded as significant events that united punk music into the festival scene. Anniversary festivals took place in March 2015 and September 2016.

== History ==
=== 1970s ===
In the 1970s Rochdale resident and associate of John Peel (through his links with the band Tractor) Chris Hewitt was one of the main organisers of the event between 1976 and 1978 along with residents of a commune further up Oldham Road in Rochdale. Hewitt's inspiration for Deeply Vale Festivals was partly triggered working on Bickershaw Festival with Jeremy Beadle in 1972 and an event at Rivington Pike in August 1976. Chris went on to produce many other festivals and concerts and start a record company Ozit/Dandelion Records.

=== Deeply Vale 1976–79 ===
Starting with an audience of 300 camping for two days in 1976 watching space rockers Body and John Peel favourites Tractor, the festival grew to 3,000 in 1977 (bands including Andy McCluskey's Pegasus, a forerunner of OMD in 1977). By 1978 and 1979 there were 20,000 people watching bands and camping for six days.

Festival Welfare Services (a Home Office sponsored body) said in a 1978 report that the Deeply Vale Festival "was actually better organised than the large Bob Dylan concert at Blackbushe the same summer"; "In fact in 1978 it was a model for how festivals should be run". It was the biggest free festival in England ending its annual run in the valley of Deeply Vale after four years in 1979.

As with the 1970s festivals, Deeply Vale hoped to bring together music of all styles and has since been credited as a catalyst for many bands who have formed since the 1970s festivals. Among people who claim to have been in the audience and inspired to pursue a musical career include Andy Rourke of The Smiths, David Gedge from the Wedding Present, Dave Fielding, Mark Burgess and Reg Smithies from the Chameleons, Jimi Goodwin from the Doves, Boff Whalley from Chumbawamba Steve Cowen from the Mock Turtles and Ian Brown from the Stone Roses.

The Deeply Vale Festivals were the first of the hippie music festivals to mix punk bands on the bill in among festival stalwarts like Steve Hillage, Nik Turner, the Ruts, Misty in Roots, Tractor (who had already achieved some notoriety as a John Peel band), Here and Now, Alan Wild (now with Physical Wrecks) and The Fall.

The Fall were regulars at the festival at a young age (and Mark E. Smith held the event in high esteem), and Durutti Column played their fourth ever gig on the Deeply Vale Festival stage. Both these bands were introduced by a young Tony Wilson who had just started his own record company and offered to help his friend Chris Hewitt by appearing at Deeply Vale in 1978.

The festival resumed on a smaller scale at Pickup Bank (Edgworth/Darwen) in 1980 and 1981.

=== Recognition 2009 ===
In September 2009, two buildings associated with Deeply Vale Festivals, Factory Records, Tractor and John Peel – one building formerly Tractor Sound Studios in Heywood and one in Rochdale Tractor Music / Cargo Studios – had blue plaques unveiled to commemorate the important part the buildings played in the genealogy of rock music. The blue plaques campaign was put together by Peter Hook and Chris Hewitt.

=== Truly, Madly, Deeply Vale ===
Luke Bainbridge (journalist and editor of the Observer Music Monthly and attendee of Deeply Vale Festivals as a youngster) said in the 2004 ITV documentary Truly, Madly, Deeply Vale that the festivals were far more organised than Glastonbury by 1978. In July 2007 the DVD Deeply Vale Festivals was released. It contains 3 hours 40 minutes of archive band performances and interviews and the 49-minute Truly, Madly, Deeply Vale film plus other rare interviews, crowd footage and band performances.

=== Festivals book ===
A 272-page A4 book tracing the history of the four festivals in the Deeply Vale valley 1976/77/78/79, the two (Deeply Vale 1980 and 1981) festivals at Pickup Bank, the Rivington Pike Free Festivals 1976 and 1977, and the Manchester 1978 Rock Against Racism concerts was released in October 2014. The book came in a box set and contained eight hours of Deeply Vale related music spread over 6 CDs.

=== Deeply Vale 2015 ===
Following the release of the documentary, there were plans to resurrect the festival in this century. One idea was to merge with relaunching the Bickershaw Festival to become the Deeply Vale Bickershaw Festival. In the end Deeply Vale happened again after the release of the 2014 box set.

On 20 March 2015, Deeply Vale Festival 2015 took place in Heywood with Steve Hillage, with Mark E Smith from The Fall there to watch him, plus other performances from Notsensibles, Nik Turner, Segs from The Ruts, Victor Brox, George Borowski, Andy T, Graham Massey and Graham Clark, Andy Sharrocks and Accident on the East Lancs, Wilful Damage, Physical Wrecks, Movement Banned and Brian Eastwood and Pie.

=== Deeply Vale 2016 ===
To mark the 40th anniversary of the first year of Deeply Vale 1976, on Saturday 17 and Sunday 18 September 2016 a festival was held at the Heywood Civic Centre in Heywood, including appearances by many of the artists who had played the original festivals: Steve Hillage, members of Here and Now and Gong, Nik Turner, Segs from The Ruts, The Drones, Victor Brox, Andy T, Mike Sweeney and the Salford Jets, Fast Cars, Andy Sharrocks and Accident on the East Lancs, Wilful Damage, Physical Wrecks, George Borowski and Gaynor Wilson with Jaki Windmill, Andy Bole, Potential Victims, Crude Oil Inc, Alchemist, Mudanzas and loads more. The festival weekend was captured on film and released as a beautiful artistic 3 DVD set.

== See also ==
- List of punk rock festivals
- List of historic rock festivals
