= Songs for the Gentle Man =

Studio album by Bridget St John
- Released: 1971
- Studio: Sound Techniques, Chelsea, London
- Genre: Folk rock
- Label: Dandelion
- Producer: Ron Geesin

Bridget St John chronology
Ask Me No Questions (1969)	Songs for the Gentle Man (1971)	Thank You For... (1972)

Songs for the Gentle Man is a 1971 folk rock album by singer-songwriter Bridget St John. A follow-up to her highly successful debut album, Songs for the Gentle Man propelled her to cult status in the United Kingdom. The album was produced by Ron Geesin, who had worked with Pink Floyd.

== Track listing ==
All tracks composed by Bridget St John; except where indicated

1. "A Day a Way"—3:17
2. "City-Crazy"—2:45
3. "Early Morning Song"—1:56
4. "Back to Stay" (John Martyn)—4:46
5. "Seagull-Sunday" (Nigel Beresford)—3:09
6. "If You'd Been There"—4:08
7. "Song for the Laird of Connaught Hall – Part 2"—1:27
8. "Making Losing Better"—3:54
9. "The Lady and the Gentle Man"—3:10
10. "Downderry Daze"—3:20
11. "The Pebble and the Man" (Donovan Leitch)—3:34
12. "It Seems Very Strange"—0:41

Bonus Tracks on Japanese CD
13. "Fly High" (Single version)
14. "There's a Place I Know"
15. "Suzanne"
16. "Passing Thru'"

== Personnel ==
- Jerry Boys - engineer
- Baba Kerr - cover
- Adrian Lynne, Mitch Walker - photography
