= Tractor (band) =

British rock band

Tractor is an English rock band founded in Rochdale, Lancashire by guitarist/vocalist Jim Milne and drummer Steve Clayton in 1971. Both had been members of a beat group, The Way We Live, since 1966. They are notable both for their appreciation by John Peel and Julian Cope, but also for their longevity because as of 2007, they were still performing. The band was produced initially by schoolfriend sound engineer John Brierley.

== Early history ==
In the early days, the main marketing tool of unsigned hopeful bands was to send demo tapes. Accordingly, a tape was sent by John Brierley to Elektra Records, part of the CBS group. Clive Selwood was the CBS UK operations manager and he listened to the tape and liked what he heard. He and his business partner, DJ John Peel, signed the band to their Dandelion Records label. Peel had a fondness for Rochdale, having worked in a cotton mill there before becoming a DJ. Clive Selwood came to Rochdale to sign up the band.

The group was booked into London's Spot Studios and finished the sessions within two days, and in January 1971 the band's debut album, A Candle for Judith was released, credited to The Way We Live. The release, named after Clayton's then girlfriend, later wife, earned immediate critical acclaim "...impeccable in both technique and emotion"... Al Clark writing in Time Out in London in 1971.

Meanwhile, Peel bought the band recording equipment and a stereo PA system. He also convinced the band to change their name. Looking out of his kitchen window at Peel Acres in Suffolk, he spied a tractor in the fields adjacent to his house and recommended it as a name to them. Tractor's first release after the name change from The Way We Live was a 7-inch maxi single – "Stoney Glory"/"Marie"/"As You Say"—for Dandelion. They also backed up another Dandelion act – Beau — on his Creation album (1971). All of this recording was done in an attic and bedroom studio of a terraced house in Edenfield Road Rochdale, which John Peel named Dandelion Studios, Rochdale to tie in with his record label Dandelion Records.

The duo's first full-length follow-up was released in 1972. By January 1973, the album was earning positive reviews. Sound engineer John Brierley was eventually replaced by former The Way We Live singer Alan Burgess and, along with Chris Hewitt who would eventually manage the band, Milne, and Clayton, the group began building a studio in Dawson Street, Market Street Heywood, Lancashire, named Tractor Sound Studios, again partially financed by John Peel. This studio would feature in a BBC film about Rochdale, Heywood, and John Peel, when the band and Chris Hewitt revisited the studio in December 2006. In September 2009, the location of Tractor Sound Studios was celebrated with a blue plaque as a testimonial to the members of Tractor and John Peel. Unveiled by Steve Clayton, Peter Hook-Joy Division/New Order), Rev Mike Huck and Chris Hewitt The plaque is mounted on the front of the building. The part finished third album for Dandelion, which was to be eventually released in the 1990s as Worst Enemies, was recorded at both Chipping Norton Recording Studios, Oxfordshire and Tractor Sound Studios, Heywood.

Tractor eventually left the Dandelion label, which had effectively ceased to operate for about 17 years in 1973-confirmed by John Peel's article on Dandelion ceasing for a while in 1973

== After Dandelion ==
Tractor then recorded a single in their Heywood studio, the reggae-tinged "Roll the Dice", released on Jonathan King's UK Records label.

In the summer of 1976, Milne and Clayton and manager Chris Hewitt recruited bassist Dave Addison and teamed up again with studio engineer John Brierley, now the owner of Cargo Recording Studios at that point based in his house on Drake Street. They recorded another single "No More Rock 'n' Roll" / "Northern City", which was issued on Cargo Records of Rochdale and made the newly invented NME Indie singles chart. It also appeared on the 1977 punk compilation LP, Streets. The "No More Rock'n'Roll" single was released to coincide with the 1977 Deeply Vale Festival, a North West England music festival of the 1970s which the band were heavily involved in. At this point Tractor Music- PA Company and Music shop moved into premises along with Cargo Studios on Kenion Street, Rochdale. The whole street became a music complex during the 1970s to the 1990s with many well known bands including Joy Division buying equipment here and hiring PA's from Tractor Music and recording in Cargo Studios, A blue plaque was put on Tractor's building in Rochdale in 2009 to celebrate its use as Cargo Studios, Tractor Music and Suite Sixteen Studios.

In 1980, Milne, Clayton, and Addison entered the studio, this time adding blind musician Tony Crabtree on keyboards/guitar. They recorded another single – "Average Man's Hero" / "Big Big Boy" – this one for Roach Records, which was a label run by the band themselves. The band started live concerts and recording again in 2001 with the two piece original line up of Jim Milne and Steve Clayton.

== Recent history ==
As recently as 2004, Julian Cope has given Tractor and their first album favourable attention.

The band issued CDs on numerous labels from 1991 before starting their own company in 1996, Ozit Morpheus Records, which has now reissued their entire back catalogue. Tractor began performing live again in 2001 (just the original duo of Jim Milne and Steve Clayton) and have become a regular festival band playing both Glastonbury and Canterbury festivals. In 2004 Tractor took part and provided music for an ITV documentary, Truly, Madly, Deeply Vale. This was released as an extended DVD, Deeply Vale Festivals in July 2007. BBC Television also showed a short documentary on Tractor in January 2007. Tractor spent 2007 and 2008 in the studio recording additional material for a new extended version of their album about the Peterloo Massacre which was eventually released in August 2011. The new double LP Townhead Mill was released in late 2012.

Clayton published his first novel, The Art Of Being Dead, in 2008.

In 2019, as a protest against the planned demolition of four of the seven College Bank blocks of flats, the band released Shubunkin Over Rochdale College Bank, a vinyl LP including all the tracks from their 1972 LP plus "Watching White Stars", "Northern City", and "Mr Revolution Man".

== Discography ==
=== Albums ===
- A Candle for Judith (as 'The Way We Live') [1971] on LP and CD
- Tractor [1972] Album on LP and CD
- Original Masters album on CD AKA Tractor including..... The Way We Live - Original Masters 1992 Album CD
- Worst Enemies 1996 Compilation Album on CD
- Before, During and After the Dandelion Years, Through to Deeply Vale and Beyond 1998 Album on CD
- Steve's Hungarian Novel- 1999 Double Album on LP
- John Peel bought us a studio and PA CD (2006)
- Peterloo- Various artists including Tractor CD 16 August 2011
- The Road From Townhead Mill Double LP with free CD October 2012
- The Art Of being Steve Clayton Double LP summer 2013
- Shubunkin Over Rochdale College Bank LP 2019
- The Way We Live - A Candle for Judith 50th Anniversary 2 LP May 2021
- Tractor 50th Anniversary Album on 2 LP set July 2022

=== Singles ===
- "King Dick II" – as The Way We Live on Dandelion EP (picture label )
- "Stoney Glory"/"Marie"/"As You Say" – Dandelion Maxi single
- "Roll The Dice" – UK Records
- "No More Rock'n'Roll" – Cargo Records
- "No More Rock'n'Roll" – Jim Milne and Tractor without Steve Clayton Polydor
- "Average Man's Hero" – Roach Records

=== Compilations ===
- There is Some Fun Going Forward – Dandelion sampler album (1972)
- A Bolt From the Black – featuring Tractor, Jimmy Page, Samson, Warhorse
- Streets – Beggars Banquet sampler album (1977)
- Hard Rock – Dutch sampler
- It started in Rochdale CD Album 2008 Ozit Morpheus Records CD 247

=== DVD ===
- "Beyond Deeply Vale" – Ozit Morpheus/ents DVD ooo4
- "Deeply Vale Festivals" – Ozit Morpheus DVD ooo5
- "John Peel's Dandelion Records" – Ozit Morpheus DVD 0007
