= The Liverpool Roadrunners =

English Merseybeat band

The Roadrunners

Background information
- Also known as: The Liverpool Roadrunners
- Origin: Liverpool, England
- Genres: Merseybeat
- Years active: 1962–1966
- Website: liverpool-roadrunners.org.uk

The Roadrunners were an English band that emerged from the burgeoning music scene in 1960s Liverpool. (They were billed either as The Roadrunners or as The Road Runners. The word "Liverpool" has been added to distinguish them from other bands who subsequently used the name.)

Unlike many of their Liverpool contemporaries, they specialised in a Chicago blues / Muddy Waters / Bo Diddley / Bobby Bland style of rhythm and blues – a genre of music which was more popular in Southern England at the time, led by the up-and-coming Rolling Stones. Bill Harry, editor of Mersey Beat, recollects that George Harrison once said that "The Stones are good – almost as good as the Roadrunners".

The band was resident at the Hope Hall (now the Liverpool Everyman Theatre). Here they entertained students from the nearby university and art school. They also took part in "happenings" organised by Liverpool poet Adrian Henri. The band also performed many times at the Cavern Club. They were invited to support The Beatles on their last Cavern gig on 3 August 1963 and, on 28 February 1964, were on the bill of the first annual British Rhythm and Blues Festival held in Birmingham. They supported the Rolling Stones when they played at the Cavern 5 November 1963.

Two trips were made to Hamburg's Star-Club, first over the Christmas and into the New Year period of 1963 / 64 and again during July / August 1964. While at the Star-Club, the group recorded two sessions for the club's own Star-Club Record label that were initially only released in Germany under the titles of "Twist-Time im Star-Club 4" and "Tanz-Show im Star-Club 2".

== Line-up ==
The original line-up was:

- Mike (a.k.a. Henry) Hart – Guitar, Sax, Vocals (born Michael William Hart, 3 December 1943, Bebington, Cheshire died 22 June 2016)
- Pete Mackey – Bass, Vocals
- Dave Boyce – Drums (born 19 February 1945, Bebington, Cheshire)
- John Peacock – Piano
- Dave Percy – Guitar, Vocals

Inevitably there were changes in the line-up. The first being the leaving of guitarist Dave Percy and the arrival of two sax players (Nick Carver a.k.a. Nick le Grec and American Johnny Phillips) following the group's first Hamburg engagement. The band have commented that, by 1964, "everyone was jumping on the R&B bandwagon, so it was time to move on". Their second Star Club Records release – recorded live on-stage in front of a Star-Club audience – reflects a move towards a more contemporary soul / blues sound in the manner of James Brown and was very much facilitated by the sax sound of Johnny Phillips and Nick Carver. Unfortunately, Johnny Phillips was obliged to leave the group at the end of their second Hamburg stint. As a US citizen, he had been working in the UK without a work permit and was advised not to attempt returning to Liverpool with the other members of the band.

Success in Britain was elusive. Recording deals were talked about, but never seemed to happen.

The Roadrunners make two contributions to the recording of the grandly-named "First Annual R&B Festival" (1964) and also cut an EP to help raise money for Liverpool University's rag or "panto" week (a charity fund raising event).

Mike Hart left the band to pursue a solo career, recording two albums for John Peel's "Dandelion" label. (Peel was a British radio presenter who championed the innovative rather than the commercially successful.) In 1980 he began work on a third solo project. Five tracks were recorded, but none were released. They have been rediscovered, remastered and put online via the Roadrunners' website.

The band finally split in 1966.

In an article published in the Liverpool Post newspaper, 31 May 2011, poet Roger McGough stated that his and the Beatles' favourite band of the time was the Roadrunners.

Boyce died on 1 May 2024, at the age of 79.
