= (And The) Pictures in the Sky =

Single by Medicine Head
- B-side: "Natural Sight"
- Released: 1971
- Genre: Rock
- Label: Dandelion
- Songwriter(s): John Fiddler
- Producer(s): Keith Relf

Medicine Head singles chronology
"Coast to Coast (And Shore to Shore)" (1970)	"(And The) Pictures in the Sky" (1971)	"How Does It Feel" (1971)

"(And The) Pictures in the Sky" is a song by the British band, Medicine Head. It was written by band member, John Fiddler.

The first hit single for Medicine Head, it was released in 1971 and entered the UK Singles Chart in June, reaching number 22 in July.
