= Stack Waddy (album) =

Studio album by Stack Waddy
- Released: 1971
- Recorded: 20 Nov 1970 – May 1971 at Dandelion Records Studios, England
- Genre: Blues rock, psychedelic rock, hard rock, proto-punk
- Length: 36:01
- Label: Dandelion Records
- Producer: Eddie Lee Beppeaux, Miss Pig

Stack Waddy chronology
Stack Waddy (1971)	Bugger Off! (1972)

Stack Waddy is the first album by Stack Waddy, released in 1971 on Dandelion Records.

== Critical reception ==
Professional ratings
Review scores
Source	Rating
Allmusic	4/5 stars

Music website Allmusic gave Stack Waddy four out of five stars. Reviewer Dave Thompson highlights the work as one of the "must hear" rock albums of the early 1970s, pointing out the brutal and uncompromising interpretations on many songs as one of the most striking features of the album. He ends his comment by saying that: "...this is one of those few albums that genuinely requires you to wear protective clothing".

== Track listing ==
1. "Roadrunner" – 3:26
2. "Bring It to Jerome" – 5:18
3. "Mothballs" – 3:35
4. "Sure Nuff 'n Yes I Do" – 2:29
5. "Love Story" – 2:19
6. "Susie Q" – 2:27
7. "Country Line Special" – 3:55
8. "Rolling Stone" – 3:25
9. "Mystic Eyes" – 6:05
10. "Kentucky" – 2:42

== Personnel ==
Stack Waddy

- John Knail – vocals, harmonica
- Steve Revell – drums, percussion
- Mick Stott – electric guitar
- Stuart Banham – bass guitar

Production

- Eddie Lee Beppeaux, Miss Pig – producers
- John Peel – executive producer
- George Borzyskowski – photography
