= Medicine Head =

British blues rock band

- Origin: Stafford, England
- Genres: Blues rock
- Years active: 1968–1977
- Labels: Dandelion; Polydor; Barn; WWA
- Past members: John Fiddler; Peter Hope-Evans

Medicine Head were a British blues rock band – initially a duo – active in the 1970s. Their biggest single success was in 1973 with "One and One Is One", which reached number 3 on the UK Singles Chart. The group recorded six original albums, the first three of which were released by John Peel's Dandelion label.

== Main personnel ==
For most of its career, the group was a duo comprising:

- John Fiddler (born 25 September 1947, the Moxley area of Darlaston, Staffordshire, England) – (vocals, guitars, piano and drums)
- Peter Hope-Evans (born 28 September 1947, Brecon, Powys, Wales) – (harmonica, Jew's harp, guitar, and mouthbow)

At various stages, the band involved the following musicians: Laurence Archer, Clive Edwards, Keith Relf, Tony Ashton, Roger Saunders, George Ford, John Davies, Rob Townsend and Morgan Fisher.

== Career ==
Fiddler and Hope-Evans met while attending Wednesfield Grammar School, Wolverhampton and later Stafford Art School, only to then quit, and began performing together on an informal basis. In or around 1968, they began performing the blues and rock and roll songs in pubs and clubs in and around Birmingham. Radio DJ John Peel saw Fiddler and Hope-Evans perform at the Lafayette Club and later shared their music with John Lennon, Eric Clapton and Pete Townshend. At Lennon's insistence, the duo was signed by Dandelion Records.

The demo recording of "His Guiding Hand" was released as a single, Peel describing it as "the cheapest single ever made and one of the classic records of all time" and keeping the single in his box of most treasured records. The duo's first album, New Bottles Old Medicine, was recorded in a single two-hour session, and they toured with Peel at many of his gigs, Peel paying them out of his own fee. Their second album, Heavy on the Drum, was recorded with Keith Relf, formerly of The Yardbirds, as producer. The single "(And The) Pictures in the Sky" rose to number 22 on the UK Singles Chart in 1971. This was not included on Heavy on the Drum, but was added to CD reissues of their debut, New Bottles Old Medicine. "(And The) Pictures in the Sky" was the first hit on the Dandelion label.

Hope-Evans left the band for over a year, and Fiddler, Relf (on bass), and drummer John Davies recorded the band's third album and last on Dandelion, Dark Side of the Moon. It was released in 1972, the year before the Pink Floyd album of the same name. According to Nicholas Schaffner, Pink Floyd briefly changed the name of their piece (which they were already performing live), to Eclipse, until the Medicine Head album turned out to be "a commercial dud". The track "Only To Do What Is True" appeared on the 1972 compilation, There Is Some Fun Going Forward.

Medicine Head signed for Polydor Records, and Hope-Evans returned for the album One & One Is One, produced by Tony Ashton and recorded with various session musicians. The title track became the band's biggest hit, reaching number 3 in the UK in 1973, and they followed it up with "Rising Sun" (number 11). For the next album, Thru' A Five, the duo were augmented on a regular basis by Rob Townsend – previously of Family – on drums, Roger Saunders on guitar, and George Ford on bass. The album featured the Slim Harpo-influenced song "Slip and Slide", which became the band's final hit, reaching number 22 in the UK in 1974. Despite consistent touring, often as a supporting act, Medicine Head failed to place an album on the UK Albums Chart. For their final album, Two Man Band, recorded at Pete Townshend's Eel Pie Studios, they reverted to being a duo. Medicine Head finally folded in 1977.

In 2005, Angel Air released the album Don't Stop The Dance. In effect it was a 'lost' album, compiling some singles from an unsuccessful period with the WWA label, and some unreleased sessions with the band as a five-piece. In March 2007, Medicine Head's debut album New Bottles, Old Medicine was re-released on CD by Cherry Red Records. In May 2009, Cherry Red also released, One And One Is One – The Very Best Of Medicine Head. Fiddler released solo albums after the breakup of the band but revived the Medicine Head name for Fiddlersophical in 2011.

== Post break-up careers ==
Since the band's break-up, both members have continued to work in the music industry.

Fiddler was a member of British Lions and Box of Frogs, and has released solo material including a 1995 album, Return of the Buffalo. He has occasionally revived the Medicine Head name, to tour a show of their hits (fellow musicians have included Laurence Archer, Clive Edwards, Mark Luckhurst and James Fox) and to release further low-key recordings. In 2020, John Fiddler again resurrected the Medicine Head name to release 2021's Warriors of Love and 2024's Heartwork albums.

Hope-Evans appeared on many albums, most prominently with Pete Townshend, and has played in several bands including The Dance Band, who released a 1980 album Fancy Footwork, and more recently accompanying singer-songwriter Noah Francis.

== Discography ==
=== Albums ===
- New Bottles, Old Medicine (1970)
- Heavy on the Drum (1971)
- Dark Side of the Moon (1972)
- One & One Is One (1973)
- Thru a Five (1974)
- Medicine Head (1976)
- Two Man Band (1976)
- Live at the Marquee (2001)
- Don't Stop the Dance (2005)
- Only the Roses (2005)
- BBC Radio Sessions: 1971–1977 (2010)
- Fiddlersophical (2011)
- Warriors Of Love (2021)
- Heartwork (2024)

=== Singles ===
- "His Guiding Hand" (1969)
- "Coast to Coast (And Shore to Shore)" (1970)
- "(And The) Pictures in the Sky" (1971) – UK number 22
- "How Does It Feel"/"Morning Light" (1972)
- "Only to Do What Is True" (1972)
- "Kum On"/"On the Land" (1972)
- "One and One Is One" (1973) – UK number 3
- "Rising Sun" (1973) – UK number 11
- "Slip and Slide" (1974) – UK number 22
- "Mama Come Out" (1974)
- "(It's Got to Be) Alright" (1974)
- "It's Natural" (1976)
- "Me and Suzie Hit the Floor" (1976)

== See also ==
- Harvest Records discography
- List of Peel sessions
- List of performers on Top of the Pops
- List of British blues musicians
