= Nurses Song with Elephants =

Studio album by David Bedford
- Released: 1972
- Genre: Modern classical
- Length: 41:41
- Label: Dandelion Records
- Producer: David Bedford

David Bedford chronology
Nurses Song with Elephants (1972)	Star's End (1974)

Professional ratings
Review scores
Source	Rating
AllMusic	2.5/5 stars

Nurses Song with Elephants is the debut solo album of David Bedford. It was released in 1972 by Dandelion Records. It features Mike Oldfield, Kevin Ayers and composer Gilbert Biberian.

== Track listing ==
All tracks composed by David Bedford.

1. "It's Easier Than It Looks"
2. "Nurses Song with Elephants" (words by William Blake)
3. "Some Bright Stars for Queens College"
4. "Trona"
5. "Sad and Lonely Faces" (words by Kenneth Patchen)

== Personnel ==
- David Bedford – recorder, melodica, piano
- Mike Oldfield – bass guitar on "Nurses Song with Elephants"
- The Omega Players – guitar on "Nurses Song with Elephants"
- Gilbert Biberian – conductor ("Nurses Song with Elephants")
- The Queens College Girls Choir – vocals on "Some Bright Stars for Queens College"
- Sebastian Bell Ensemble ("Trona")
- Kevin Ayers – vocals on "Sad and Lonely Faces"
