= Bugger Off! =

Studio album by Stack Waddy
- Released: 1972
- Recorded: 1972 at Strawberry Studios, Stockport; England.
- Genres: Blues rock, psychedelic rock
- Length: 48:51
- Label: Dandelion Records
- Producers: Eddie Lee Beppeaux, Kevin Spotte.

Stack Waddy chronology
Stack Waddy (1971)	Bugger Off! (1972)

Bugger Off! is the second album by Stack Waddy, released in 1972 on Dandelion Records.

The album liner notes by Dandelion Records's owner and executive producer, John Peel, indicate each song was recorded in a single live take with the band refusing to make any kind of overdubbing or technical treatment on the resulting sound. He narrates that on one occasion he asked them to run through a song a second time and the band members yelled "Bugger Off!, Peel", which gave rise to the album's title.

== Critical reception ==
Professional ratings
Review scores
Source	Rating
Allmusic	4/5 stars

Music website Allmusic gave Bugger Off! four out of five stars. Reviewer Dave Thompson highlights the authenticity and rawness of the band, and says the album expands the fierceness in their self-titled debut album, defining it as positively antisocial.

== Track listing ==
1. "Rosalyn" – 2:31
2. "Willie the Pimp" – 4:03
3. "I'm Your Hoochie Coochie Man" – 4:19
4. "It's All Over Now" – 3:13
5. "Several Yards" – 5:58
6. "You Really Got Me" – 2:43
7. "I'm a Lover Not a Fighter" – 2:05
8. "Meat Pies 'Ave Come but Band's Not 'Ere Yet" – 5:19
9. "It Ain't Easy" – 3:50
10. "Long Tall Shorty (Mainly)" – 3:26
11. "Repossession Boogie" – 5:32
12. "The Girl from Ipanema" – 1:27
13. "Mama Keep Your Big Mouth Shut" – 3:42 (Bonus track from Repertoire Records 2000 CD re-release)

== Personnel ==
=== Musicians ===
- John Knail - vocals, harmonica
- Steve Revell - drums
- Mick Stott - guitar
- Stuart Banham - bass

=== Production ===
- Eddie Lee Beppeaux - producer
- Kevin Spotte - producer
- John Peel - executive producer, liner notes
- Hamish Grimes - sleeve design
- John Tobler - other (liner notes)
