= With 100 Kazoos =

With 100 Kazoos is a work for chamber ensemble and 100 kazoos by the British composer David Bedford. It was composed between March-August 1971. The work was commissioned by the BBC to be performed as part of Pierre Boulez's series of concerts at the Roundhouse in 1972. Boulez refused to conduct the piece.

== Instrumentation ==
1. Flute
2. Oboe
3. Clarinet in B flat
4. Bass Clarinet
5. Horn in F
6. Trumpet in B flat
7. Trombone
8. Violins (2)
9. Viola
10. Cello
11. Double Bass
12. 100 kazoos (played by the audience).

== Performance directions ==
The audience kazoo part is for 50 men and 50 women. The score recommends a 10-15 minute rehearsal with the audience prior to performance.

The piece makes considerable use of improvisation and aleatoric techniques, most notably when performers are asked to interpret on their instruments a number of Bedford's rudimentary line drawings. At certain points, the chamber ensemble and the kazoo section are also required to imitate one another.

The composition is indicative of Bedford's sense of humour and, like many of his works, draws upon elements of astronomy and science fiction. Amongst the images which performers are required to interpret, for example, are a star chart, the planet Saturn and a spaceman playing cards with aliens. Dedicatees of the work include the science fiction writers Roger Zelazny, Theodore Sturgeon, Samuel R. Delany and the astronomer Patrick Moore.

According to Bedford, his composition for kazoos was the result of a misunderstanding with Boulez regarding the concept of audience participation. For Boulez, 'audience participation' meant a question-and-answer session about music between himself and the audience. Boulez refused to conduct Bedford's work on the grounds that audience members would interrupt other pieces on the programme with their kazoos.
