= Gilbert Biberian =

British guitarist and composer

Gilbert Emanuel Biberian (19 February 1944 – 27 January 2023) was an Armenian born guitarist, composer and teacher.

Originally from Istanbul, Turkey of Greek-Armenian heritage. Biberian's ethnic roots was integral to his compositions.

He studied at Trinity College of Music, graduating in 1968. In 1965 a French Government grant took him to France to study with Ida Presti and Alexandre Lagoya. He studied composition with James Patten, Elisabeth Lutyens and Hans Keller, as well as widening and enriching his musical knowledge by working with non-guitarists Anthony Kinsella (piano) and Vic Bennett (clarinet).

Biberian has played at the Proms, at Covent Garden and has performed concertos and given solo recitals worldwide.

He has always enthusiastically encouraged and championed the creation of new compositions for guitar. New works have been written for and/or dedicated to him (for solo and ensemble) by James Patten, Elisabeth Lutyens, Reginald Smith Brindle, Alfred Nieman, Charles Camilleri, David Bedford, Roger Williams, Glen Morgan, Robert Keeley, Jeffrey Joseph, Kenneth Paige, Daniel Sturm, Vojislav Ivanovic, Betty Roe, Ivor Mairants, Geoffrey Burgon, Aurelio Peruzzi, Judith Bingham, Monique Cecconi-Botella, Ottavio Negro and Luis Morales Giacoman.

In addition to his pioneering work in chamber music, and always in search of exciting possibilities for the guitar, he expanded the role of the instrument by combining with mime in three works, "Pierrot", "Harlequin's Toccata" and "Colombine", which are now successfully established as stage and concert pieces.

He produced a great number of compositions, not only for solo and ensemble guitar but also for all string instruments including a concerto for guitar, cello and 19 strings, which received its world première at the Habana International Festival of Guitar, Cuba, in May 1992.

His guitar compositions are being recorded and performed by an ever-increasing number of guitarists. Biberian's compositions have been published in England, Italy, Holland, Canada and the US.

Biberian died on 27 January 2023, at Cheltenham General Hospital in Cheltenham (Gloucestershire), at the age of 78.

== Sources ==
- Editions Orfee profile
