= The Quads =

English new wave band

- Origin: Birmingham, England
- Genres: New wave, post-punk
- Years active: 1979–1987
- Label: Big Bear Records
- Past members: Josh Jones; Jack Jones; Johnny Jones; Jim Doherty

The Quads were a new wave band from Birmingham, England, active in the late 1970s and early 1980s. The band was formed in Birmingham by three brothers, Josh Jones, Colin "Jack" Jones and Terry "Johnny" Jones, plus bassist Jim Doherty.

== "There Must Be Thousands" ==
Their 1979 debut single "There Must Be Thousands" was a favourite of the BBC Radio 1 DJ John Peel, who selected it as his "single of the decade!" Josh Jones later described the recording of "There Must Be Thousands": "It was a grass roots protest and two fingers to the corporate record company stranglehold on the industry. We recorded our 'hit single' in the cellar of a house for 30 quid and then a ‘proper’ studio to get a decent vocal sound, taking the total cost to a heady 130 pounds."

Despite receiving considerable airplay on the main BBC Radio 1 daytime programmes, "There Must Be Thousands" only reached No. 66 in the UK singles chart, but in 2001 John Peel still listed it as one of his all-time favourite records. Then, in 2013, to coincide with its use on a promotional video by natural skincare company JooMo, the track was re-released by Big Bear Records.

== Later activities ==
The band released further singles, including "Gotta Getta Job", which they performed during the People's March for Jobs in 1981, a march in which they took part. They continued to perform until the mid-1980s, when Doherty left. They reformed in the 1990s and made further recordings for Don Arden, but they were not released.

Josh Jones later moved to Auckland, New Zealand and became an Anglican priest, while still creating and recording new music.

== Discography ==
=== Singles ===
- "There Must Be Thousands" / "You’ve Gotta Jive", 1979, UK No. 66
- "There's Never Been A Night" / "Take It", 1979
- "UFO" / "Astronaut's Journey", 1980
- "Gotta Getta Job" / "Gang Of Kids", 1981
- "Still Moment (In Time)" / "Time To Think", 1982

=== Compilations ===
- Bouncing In The Red, 1980 EMI album, includes:
  - "There Must Be Thousands"
- Brum Beat - Live At The Barrel Organ, 1980 Big Bear Records double album, includes:
  - "When Everything's Said And Done"
  - "Wonders Never Cease"
- Shake Some Action Volume 1, 2001 bootleg CD album, includes:
  - "There Must Be Thousands" (re-mastered from vinyl)

== Peel session ==
On 29 August 1979, The Quads recorded a Peel session incorporating;

- "Revision Time Blues"
- "I Know You Know"
- "There's Never Been A Night"
- "There Must Be Thousands"

== Members ==
- Josh Jones – vocals, guitar
- Jack Jones – guitar
- Johnny Jones – drums
- Jim Doherty – bass guitar

== Music excerpts ==
Quads - There Must Be Thousands excerpt
An excerpt from The Quads' There Must Be Thousands

- Listen on YouTube There must be thousands - Bouncing in the red, 1980 EMI
- Listen on YouTube Feel the need for more - Unreleased material, 1988
