= David Nolan (British author) =

David Nolan is a British television producer and author, specialising in music and popular culture biographies, covering subjects from the Sex Pistols to Simon Cowell. He is also the author of a trilogy of crime fiction novels known as ‘Manc Noir’.

Based in Manchester, Nolan is known for investigating and proving/disproving myths in popular music. He tracked down the audience for the famous 4 June and 20 July 1976 gig by the Sex Pistols at Manchester's Lesser Free Trade Hall, and discovered the reasons for the secrecy surrounding the family history of New Order frontman Bernard Sumner. He also incurred the wrath of Morrissey by turning him into a cartoon character for the Granada Television documentary These Things Take Time in 2002, after the former The Smiths singer refused to appear in the programme.

In 2008, he produced the Salford Music Map for Salford City Council, showing many of the city's music landmarks and artists, including Bernard Sumner, Ewan MacColl and Tim Burgess of the Charlatans. His biography of Tony Wilson was published in 2009. In it he revealed details of the late music entrepreneur's early years, his careers in music and television, his personal relationships as well his battle with the NHS for the cancer drug Sutent. The book was written with the co-operation of Wilson's partner.

After writing books on Ed Sheeran and Emeli Sandé, his biography of Nottingham singer Jake Bugg was published in 2014. It was reviewed by Bugg's father for the Nottingham Post, who said it contained, "Information I didn't know... Reading it was quite emotional for me at times."

Nolan's first non-entertainment book to date was Tell The Truth And Shame The Devil in 2015, his account of the trial and imprisonment of Alan Morris - a teacher at his former school St Ambrose College - for historic abuse crimes. The book was the basis for the BBC Radio Four documentary 'The Abuse Trial' broadcast in 2016. The programme won Gold at the New York International Festival, and also won a Rose d'Or.

In 2018 his first novel Black Moss was published, a crime fiction story set during the Strangeways prison riot in Manchester in 1990. It was followed in 2020 by The Mermaid's Pool and in 2022 by The Ballad of Hanging Lees - all three books are classed as ‘Manc Noir’ and named after bodies of water in and around Manchester. The Manc Noir novels are now being adapted into a TV series, starting with Black Moss.

Books

- I Swear I Was There: The Gig That Changed the World (Milo Books 2001/Independent Music Press 2006)
- Bernard Sumner: Confusion – Joy Division, Electronic and New Order Versus The World (IMP 2007)
- Damon Albarn – Blur, Gorillaz and other Fables (IMP 2007)
- You're Entitled To An Opinion – The High Times and Many Lives of Tony Wilson, Factory Records and the Haçienda (John Blake Publishing 2009)
- Simon Cowell – The Man Who Changed the World (John Blake Publishing 2010)
- Emma Watson – The Biography (John Blake Publishing 2011)
- Ed Sheeran – A+ (John Blake Publishing 2012)
- Emeli Sandé - The Biography (John Blake Publishing 2013)
- Jake Bugg - The Biography (John Blake Publishing 2014)
- Tell The Truth and Shame the Devil (John Blake Publishing 2015)
- I Swear I Was There - Sex Pistols, Manchester and the Gig That Changed The World (John Blake Publishing 2016)
- The 1975 - Love, Sex & Chocolate (John Blake Publishing 2017)
- George Michael - Freedom (Carlton Books 2017)
- Black Moss (Fahrenheit Press 2018)
- The Mermaid’s Pool (Fahrenheit Press 2020)
- The Ballad of Hanging Lees (Fahrenheit Press 2022)
- Rain Falls Hard (Fahrenheit Press 2024)

Television music documentaries

- Wall of Fame (1998) (The Beatles/Oasis/Joy Division)
- I Swear I Was There (2001) (Sex Pistols)
- These Things Take Time: The Story of the Smiths (2002)
- Meet the Bunnymen (Echo & the Bunnymen – 2001)
- Truly, Madly, Deeply Vale (free rock festival movement of the 1970s – 2004)
