= Beau (guitarist) =

British singer-songwriter and twelve-string guitar player

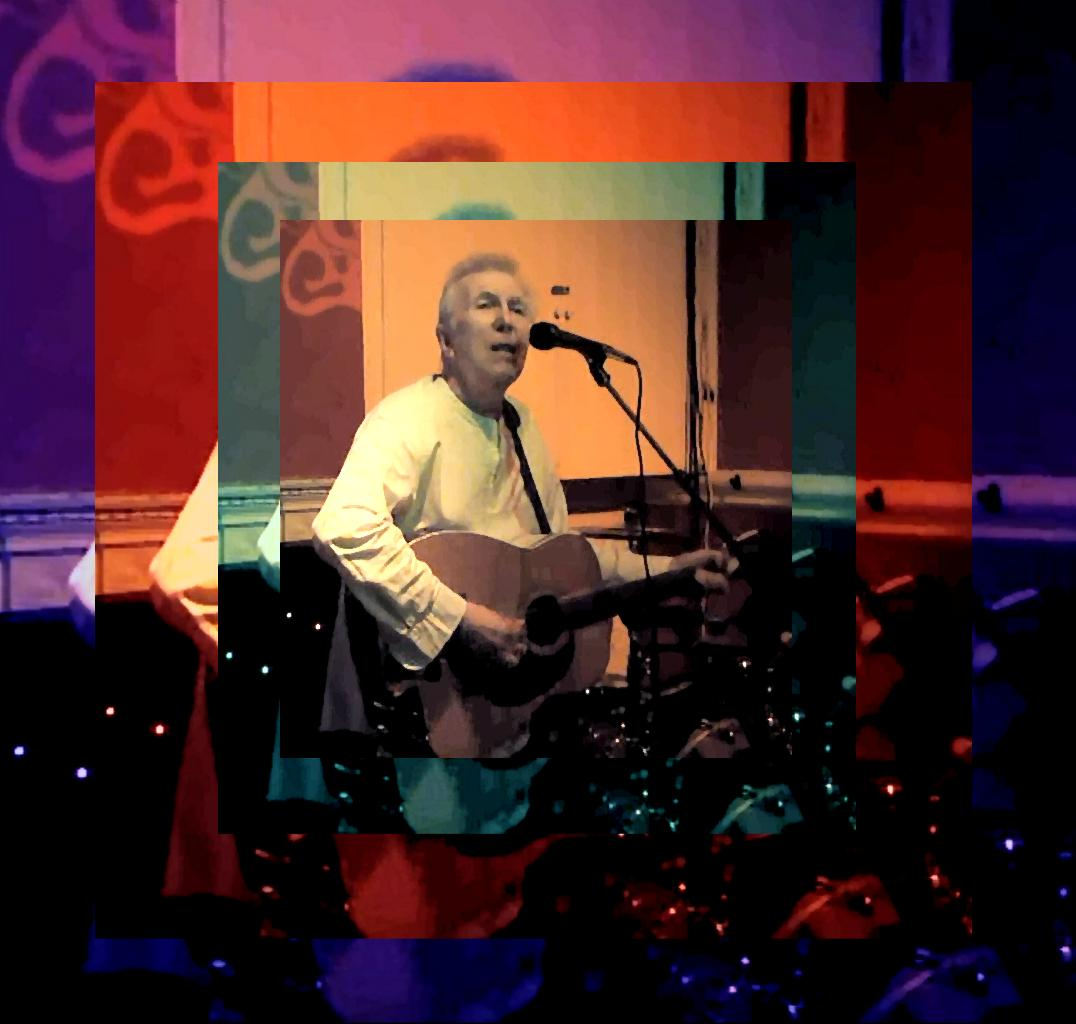
- Live in Lichfield (2012)

Background information
- Also known as: Beau, John Trevor, Trevor Midgley, Simfonica
- Born: Christopher John Trevor Midgley; May 1946; Leeds, England
- Genres: Folk, psychedelic folk, electronica
- Occupations: Musician, songwriter
- Instruments: Vocals, 12-string guitar, guitar, keyboards
- Years active: 1969–present
- Labels: Dandelion, See For Miles, Cherry Red, Angel Air, Fruits de Mer
- Website: ,

Beau, born Christopher John Trevor Midgley, is a British singer-songwriter and twelve-string guitar player.

== Biography ==
He first became known in the late 1960s through his recordings for John Peel's Dandelion Records label. He released two albums on Dandelion – Beau (1969) and Creation (1971) plus the single "1917 Revolution".

He wrote "The Roses of Eyam" (under the name of John Trevor) which folk singer Roy Bailey recorded on his Hard Times LP in 1985. Beau himself released the song officially for the first time as a bonus track on the 2007 British reissue of the original Beau disc (Cherry Red), and on the 2008 Japanese release of the same album (Airmail Recordings).

A CD of eighteen previously unissued songs – Edge of the Dark – was issued on the Angel Air label in 2009, followed in 2011 by the Cherry Red download albums The Way It Was and Creation Recreated. The latter was a remastered, partially remixed and much expanded version of 1971's Creation. Beau also contributed a previously unreleased song – In The Court of Conscience – to vinyl specialist Fruits de Mer Records' 2012 Annual, and a 180gram vinyl version of The Way It Was was issued by Ritual Echo Records in 2012.

A download album – Fables & Façades – was also released in 2012 on the Cherry Red label. An unusual departure, this was made up of eighteen mostly full-band arrangements recorded between 1978 and 2000.

Beau has produced several hundred songs - newly recorded albums continue to be released by Cherry Red for both download and streaming - and he has also recorded under the names of John Trevor, Trevor Midgley and Simfonica. Though mostly known as a "folk" performer, his writing has also been strongly influenced by blues and rock. He co-wrote "WARHOL – The Musical" with Steve Clayton of the band Tractor.

== List of work ==
=== Discography ===
- 1917 Revolution [single] (Dandelion, 1969)
- Beau (Dandelion, 1969)
- 1917 Revolution [single] (Dandelion (Netherlands), 1970)
- Creation (Dandelion, 1971)
- Creation/Beau (See For Miles, 1995)
- Beau (Cherry Red, 2007)
- Beau (Air Mail Archive (Japan), 2008)
- Creation (Air Mail Archive (Japan), 2008)
- Edge of the Dark (Angel Air, 2009)
- Beau (Cherry Red, 2010)
- The Way It Was (Cherry Red, 2011)
- Creation Recreated (Cherry Red, 2011)
- The Was It Was [vinyl] (Ritual Echo, 2012)
- Fables & Façades (Cherry Red, 2012)
- Twelve Strings to the Beau [vinyl] (Salvation Records, 2013)
- Fly the Bluebird (Cherry Red, 2014)
- Recorded @ Rocker’s – The Dandelion Radio Sessions… (Local Underground, 2014)
- Creation [vinyl] (Sommor (Spain), 2015)
- Shoeless in the Desert (Cherry Red, 2015)
- An Original Thought (Cherry Red, 2016)
- Song of the Volcanoes [as Simfonica] (Cathedral Transmissions, 2016)
- When Butterflies Scream (Cherry Red, 2017)
- Letters in Time [DVD] [as Simfonica] (TM Studios, 2017)
- Rattle The Asylum Bars (Cherry Red, 2018)
- Body Mass [as Simfonica] (TM Studios, 2018)
- Damascus Road (Cherry Red, 2019)
- The Magic of Public Relations (Cherry Red, 2020)
- The Methadone of Time (Cherry Red, 2021)
- Travelling The Highway [as Trevor Midgley] (Felt Production Music / Cherry Red, 2021)
- Beau [vinyl] (Trading Places (Italy), 2021)
- Al Killem's Final Show (Cherry Red, 2022)
- Creation [vinyl] (Trading Places (Italy), 2022)
- Twelve Strings to the Beau (Cherry Red, 2023)
- Edge of the Dark (Cherry Red, 2023)
- Kingdom of the Blind (Cherry Red, 2023)
- Deep in the Dark – Unreleased Rarities 1971-1991 (Cherry Red, 2023)
- Golden Domes [as Trevor Midgley] (Felt Production Music / Cherry Red, 2024)
- The Last Confessions of a Saboteur (Cherry Red, 2024)
- Palace of Light (Cherry Red, 2025)
- Live in Lichfield [vinyl EP] (Fruits de Mer Records, 2025)
- Bonfires of the Soul (Cherry Red, 2026)
- Warhol, The Musical - The Demos [as Trevor Midgley] (Cherry Red, 2026)

=== Compilations and other recordings ===
- There Is Some Fun Going Forward [Compilation] (Dandelion, 1972)
- There Is Some Fun Going Forward… plus (See For Miles, 1995)
- The Dandelion Sampler (See For Miles, 1996)
- Life Too, Has Surface Noise – The Complete Dandelion Records Singles Collection 1969–1972 (Cherry Red, 2006)
- Plain Sailing: An Acoustic Alternative (Cherry Red, 2008)
- All For Tomorrow (Cherry Red, 2009)
- Favourites From John Peel's Record Collection (Cherry Red, 2011)
- 2012 Annual (Fruits de Mer Records, 2011)
- Summer Folk Festival (Cherry Red, 2012)
- Indie Xmas (Cherry Red, 2012)
- The Crabs Sell Out / The Crabs Freak Out (Fruits de Mer Records, 2012)
- My Acoustic Valentine (Cherry Red, 2013)
- strange fish 5 (Fruits de Mer Records, 2013)
- Vintage Folk Festival Favourites (Cherry Red, 2013)
- A Vintage Summer Holiday (Cherry Red, 2013)
- Fruits de Mer Annual 2014 [with The Raiders] (Fruits de Mer Records, 2013)
- Love, Poetry and Revolution (Grapefruit, 2013)
- An Alternative Guide to Singer Songwriters (Cherry Red, 2014)
- Classic John Peel Collection (Cherry Red, 2014)
- Memories of a Folk Festival (Cherry Red, 2014)
- Dust on the Nettles (Grapefruit, 2015)
- The 13th Dream of Dr. Sardonicus Festival CD 1 (Fruits de Mer Records, 2015)
- The 13th Dream of Dr. Sardonicus Festival CD 3 [as Simfonica] (Fruits de Mer Records, 2015)
- The 14th Dream of Dr. Sardonicus - Day Two [as Simfonica] (Fruits de Mer Records, 2016)
- Ascending Scales [with The Honey Pot] (Fruits de Mer Records, 2017)
- Strangers in the Room: A Journey Through British Folk-Rock (1967-1973) (Grapefruit, 2019)
- The Forme to the Fynisment Foldes Ful Selden (Cold Spring Records, 2020)
- Peephole in My Brain – The British Progressive Pop Sounds of 1971 (Grapefruit, 2020)
- Separate Paths Together – An Anthology of British Male Singer/Songwriters 1965-1975 (Grapefruit, 2021)
- Crab Nebula [with The Raiders] (Fruits de Mer Records, 2023)
