= Principal Edwards Magic Theatre =

English performance arts collective

- Origin: Exeter, England
- Genres: Psychedelic rock; psychedelic folk; progressive folk
- Years active: 1968–1971 (as P.E.Magic Theatre); 1972–1974 (as Principal Edwards)
- Labels: Dandelion; Deram
- Past members: Principal Edwards Magic Theatre: Root Cartwright; Belinda "Bindy" Bourquin; David Jones; Lyn Edwards; Terry Budd; Roger Swallow; Jeremy Ensor; Joe Read; Martin Stellman; Vivienne McAuliffe; Eva Darlow; Monica Nettles; John McMahon Hill; Gillian Hadley; Les Adey; Michael "Harry" Housman; Chris Runciman Principal Edwards: Root Cartwright; Belinda "Bindy" Bourquin; David Jones; Geoff Nicholls; Richard Jones; Nick Pallett
- Website: http://www.principaledwards.com/

Principal Edwards Magic Theatre was an English performance art collective in the United Kingdom made up of about 14 musicians, poets, dancers, and sound and lighting technicians. It existed between 1968 and 1971, after which core members formed a more conventional rock band under the shortened name Principal Edwards.

== Formation ==
The collective was formed by students at the University of Exeter, who had originally intended producing an arts magazine. The initial musicians were Root Cartwright (guitar, mandolin, songwriter), Belinda "Bindy" Bourquin (violin, keyboards, recorder), David Jones (vocals, percussion), Jeremy Ensor (bass), Martin Stellman (vocals), Lyn Edwards (drums), and Vivienne McAuliffe (vocals). Dancers included Gillian Hadley (choreographer), John McMahon Hill, Eva Darlow and Monica Nettles, while Les Adey, Harry Housman and Chris Runciman were responsible for sound, lighting, props and effects. The name was taken from the Magic Theatre referenced in Hermann Hesse's novel Steppenwolf, and from Principal Thomas Charles Edwards, a theologian who was the first Principal of the University College of Wales, Aberystwyth and an ancestor of Lyn Edwards. According to Cartwright, the name had "no religious overtones, we just thought [it] sounded neat."

== Principal Edwards Magic Theatre, 1968–71 ==
Their first public performance was at an event called "Dance of Words" organised by students (one of whom was Jeremy Ensor) in Portsmouth and hosted by John Peel in May 1968, which also featured Fairport Convention, Free, Tyrannosaurus Rex, Alexis Korner, Gary Farr, Pete Brown's Poetry Band with John McLaughlin on guitar, and poets Brian Patten and Michael Horovitz. They were signed by Korner's management team and, with Peel's active support, performed at similar events and gigs in London and elsewhere, sharing bills with Pink Floyd, The Fugs, Family, Free, King Crimson, Yes, Deep Purple, Elton John, Ten Years After and others. The group were the first to be signed to Peel's Dandelion Records; though the label's co-founder Clive Selwood later described them as "the most pretentious act I have ever come across", and Peel's radio producer John Walters described them as "incorporating all kinds of arty-farty nonsense"; and performed at the first Bath Festival of Blues in June 1969.

They released their first single, "Ballad (of the Big Girl Now and a Mere Boy)", in July 1969, followed the next month by their first album, Soundtrack, produced by Peel and the band, and so called because music was only one aspect of their performance, which also incorporated dance, lighting and poetry. Most of the songs were composed by Cartwright, with lyrical contributions by other band members and associates. According to reviewer Pete Frame of Zigzag magazine, the album was "brimming with invention: time changes, unusual chord changes, interesting lyrics...". The sometimes whimsical, sometimes epic (verging on progressive rock) writing style of Cartwright, was paired with the eclectic lyrical contributions of David Jones, Gillian Hadley and Monica Nettles, and was performed by vocalist Vivienne McAuliffe. The violin and recorders of Bindy Bourquin were another key element of the group's trademark sound. Lyn Edwards, originally on bongos, took over on the drumkit.

With their education conflicting with their musical activities, members left their studies at Exeter and moved together into a large farmhouse/commune near Kettering, Northamptonshire to rehearse and as a base for their extensive touring, often as a support act for more established bands. During this time, the group opened for several acts including Pink Floyd, Led Zeppelin, and Fleetwood Mac. On one Friday evening in the 1969-1970 academic year they performed at a student dance at Rugby College of Engineering Technology, though people just stood and watched in awe. One member of the Entertainments Committee of the Students' Union had seen them elsewhere and they were booked on his recommendation and they produced a fantastic performance. In 1970, they recorded their second album, The Asmoto Running Band, produced by Nick Mason of Pink Floyd, and named for an in-joke about a roadie's poorly-written comment that they should aspire to being "a smooth running band". It was released by Dandelion in January 1971; according to Cartwright, the first side of the LP was "a green concept album, in a tongue-in-cheek sort of way."

They won a residency at the Hampstead Theatre Club in London, but there were differences over future direction. The original collective split up in December 1971, according to Cartwright as a result of "serious tensions between fringe theatre and rock priority, together with business hassles."

== Principal Edwards, 1972–74 ==
In early 1972, the core trio of Root Cartwright, Belinda Bourquin and David Jones, formed a new more rock-oriented band, with the abbreviated name of Principal Edwards. They were joined by musicians Richard Jones (bass, previously of the Climax Blues Band), Nick Pallett (guitar, vocals), and Geoff Nicholls (drums). Over the next three years they mounted three complete stage musicals, touring around the country; King of Changes; Stone Age Sam; and The Glass White Gangster. They were managed by Miles Copeland, and signed to Deram Records, who released their album Round One, again produced by Nick Mason, in 1974. However, the album was not a commercial success. After recording some more material, not released at the time but issued by Cherry Red Records in 2008 as The Devon Tapes, the band broke up.

== Life after Principal Edwards ==
Since the 1970s, members' fortunes have varied greatly. Singer Martin Stellman directed Denzel Washington in For Queen and Country; David Jones ran a community centre; and Root Cartwright became a gardener and photographic artist. Bindy Bourquin and Richard Jones married and both went into teaching. Jones plays in two bands: The Climax Ceilidh Band and Meridian. Nick Pallet and Geoff Nicholls played Twang and Bongo on Animal Kwackers, a British children's programme similar to The Banana Splits, which would also feature Tony Hannaford from G.T. Moore and the Reggae Guitars as Boots, with all three ending up in the EMI/Cobra-signed act Electrotunes in 1980.

Lyn Edwards worked extensively in theatre, as well as children's television (Play School) and BBC radio. He is currently teaching drums in schools and playing in several bands. Jeremy Ensor toured (as sound engineer/tour manager) with Deep Purple, Fleetwood Mac, McGuinness Flint, Dick Heckstall-Smith Band, Groundhogs, Albion Country Band and Greenslade (co-producing two of their LPs) and then worked as an A&R man for CBS and Phonogram Records signing, amongst others, Judas Priest, The Only Ones, and Graham Bonnett. He currently lives in north London was an IT Training Consultant. Now retired he gives talks on cruise ships.

Chris Runciman is still on the road as a tour manager/production manager, and sound and lights engineer for, amongst others, Jackson Browne, Steve Earle, and James Taylor. In recent years he worked as a technical consultant to Sir George Martin in Montserrat, helping design and then managing the Montserrat Cultural Centre.

Les Adey was the lighting technician for Genesis.

Serious illness and breakdowns have befallen some of the other former members. Dancers John McMahon Hill, Vivienne McAuliffe and Les Adey are deceased.

== Discography ==
=== As Principal Edwards Magic Theatre ===
- "Ballad (Of The Big Girl Now And A Mere Boy)" / "Lament For The Earth" (1969) Single, Dandelion Records
- Soundtrack (1969) LP, Dandelion Records
- The Asmoto Running Band (1971) LP, Dandelion Records - Produced by Nick Mason of Pink Floyd
- Round One Principal' (1974) LP, Dandelion Records - Produced by Nick Mason of Pink Floyd

(The track "The Asmoto Running Band" also appeared on an untitled sampler). (1971) EP, Dandelion Records

- Soundtrack / The Asmoto Running Band (1994) CD, See For Miles Records

(The track "Autumn Lady Dancing Song" from The Asmoto Running Band is omitted from this CD).

- Soundtrack (2006) CD, Cherry Red Records

(The "Ballad..." / "Lament for the Earth" single featured as bonus tracks on this CD).

- The Asmoto Running Band (2006) CD, Cherry Red Records

=== As Principal Edwards ===
- Round One (1974) LP, Deram
- "Captain Lifeboy" / "Nothing" (1973) single, Deram
- "Weekdaze" / "The Whizzmore Kid" (1973) single, Deram

=== Other song titles ===
- "The Kettering Song"
- "Enigmatic Insomniac Machine"
- "The Death of Don Quixote"
- "Freef(R')All"
- "Weirdsong of Breaking Through at Last"
