= Stack Waddy =

English blues rock band

- Origin: Timperley, Cheshire, England
- Genres: Blues rock, psychedelic rock, proto-punk
- Years active: 1965–2008
- Label: Dandelion Records
- Past members: John Knail; Mick Stott; Stuart Banham; John Groom; Steve Revel

Stack Waddy were an English blues rock band from Timperley, Cheshire, who were active in the late 1960s and early 1970s and again in 2007. Signed to John Peel's Dandelion label, the original line-up of John Knail, Mick Stott (born 1945, Salford, Lancashire died 6 January 2015), Stuart Banham and Steve Revel (replaced by John Groom on second album) released two albums and singles before breaking up for a while in 1973.

On 24 January 1972 (transmitted on 18 February), the band also recorded a performance for the John Peel BBC Radio 1 show, the tracks were: "Hoochie Coochie Man", "Rock Me Baby", "You Really Got Me" and "Willie the Pimp".

They have reconvened several times with their second line-up of Knail, Stott, Banham and Groom; with the last get together for the Dandelion Records biographical DVD film shoot in July 2007.

== Selected discography ==
=== Albums ===
- Stack Waddy (1971)
- Bugger Off! (1972)
- The Lost Dandelion Jams (2013)

=== Singles ===
- "Roadrunner" (1970)
- "You Really Got Me" (1972)
