= James Patten =

American artist (born 1977)

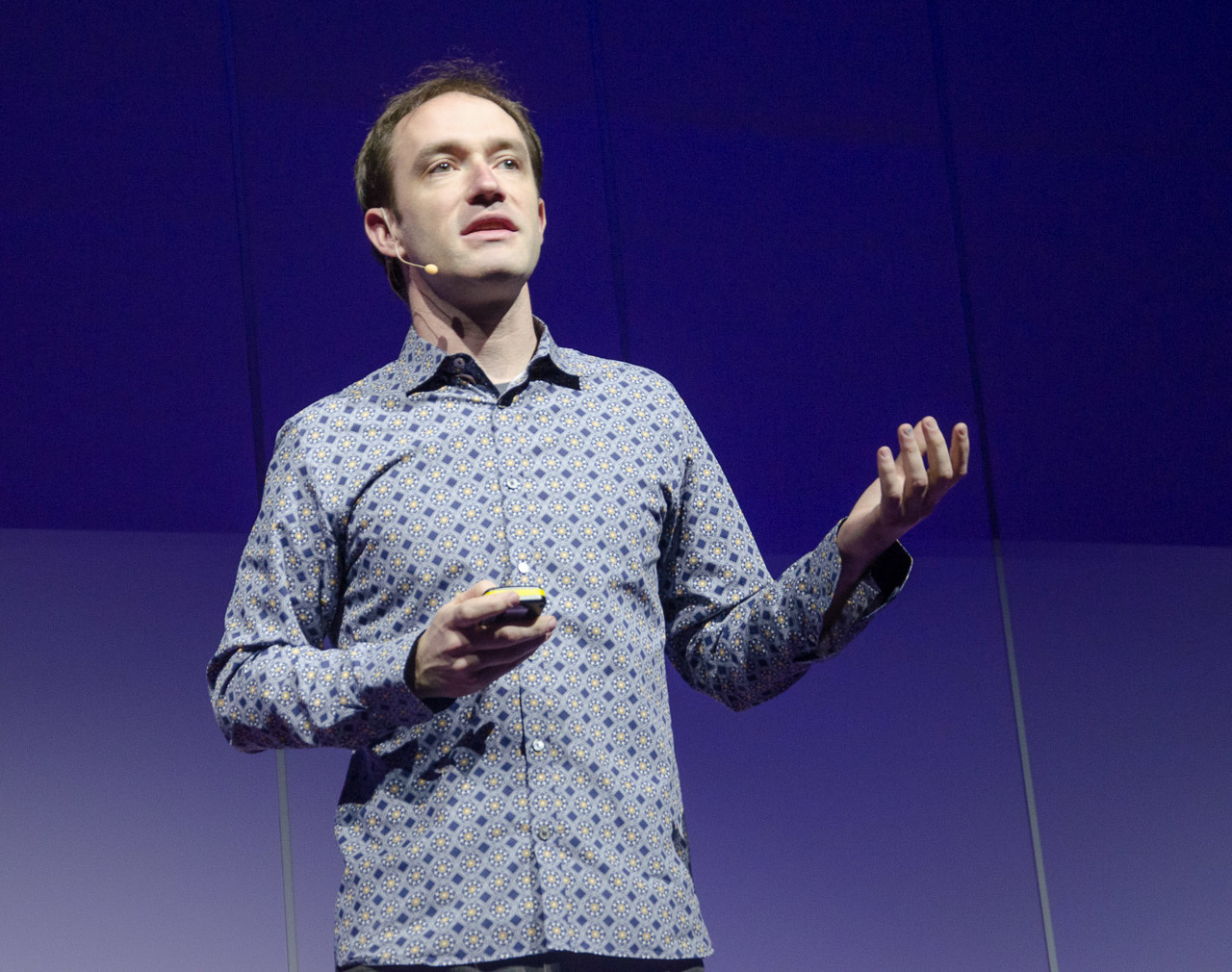
James Patten

James Patten (born 1977) is an American interaction designer, inventor, and visual artist. Patten is a TED fellow and speaker whose studio-initiated research has led to the creation of new technology platforms, like Thumbles, tiny-computer controlled robots; interactive, kinetic lighting features; and immersive environments that engage the body.

== Education ==
Patten earned his doctorate at the MIT Media Lab where he studied in the Tangible Media Group under Hiroshi Ishii. He received his PhD in Media Art and Sciences for his thesis, "Mechanical Constraints as Common Ground between People and Computers" and his MS in the same subject for his thesis, "Sensetable: A Wireless Object Tracking Platform for Tangible User Interfaces." Prior to the Media Lab, Patten studied virtual environments with Randy Pausch at the University of Virginia, and developed new interfaces for visualizing time-varying volumetric data at NASA Langley Research Center.

== Work ==
Patten's work has been exhibited or performed in various venues including the Cooper Hewitt, Smithsonian Design Museum, the Museum of Modern Art, the Transmediale Festival in Berlin, the Museo Guggenheim Bilbao and the Ars Electronica Center in Linz, Austria and recognized in several international design competitions.

James Patten is Director and Principal of Patten Studio, a decade old practice operating at the confluence of design, technology, and physical space to create interactive experiences. Projects and clients vary in scale and across industries, from brand activations, like Intel's SenseScape at CES 2016, to installations for public institutions, like the Museum of Science and Industry (Chicago) to monolithic rotating projectors for Rag & Bone's Spring/Summer Fashion Show 2017. His body of work consist merging both digital and physical spaces for "richer, real-world" tangibility. Patten's article, "Architecting Experiences" introduces a new set of design principles towards creating constructive "physical resonance." He has been admired for his ideas on improvisation and empowering people to be the authors of their own experiences, a view all the more relevant, with increasing filtration of online algorithms.

== Awards ==
- 2014 - TED Senior Fellow
- 2010 - Winner, American Association of Museums Muse Gold, Best Interactive Kiosk for “Create a Chemical Reaction”
- 2011 - TED Fellow
- 2005 - Honorable Mention - Transmediale Media Arts Festival for “Corporate Fallout Detector”
- 2005 - Director’s grant - Council for the Arts at MIT for “Corporate Fallout Detector”
- 2004 - Best in Show, Best Interactivity, Best in Academic Category - Designing Interactive Systems competition for “Audiopad”
- 2004 - Honorable Mention - International Design Magazine Annual Design Review for “Audiopad”
- 2004 - Bronze Award - Industrial Design Society of America - International Design Excellence Awards for “Audiopad"
- 2004-2006 - MIT Arts Scholar
- 2003-2005 - Mastercard Fellow, MIT Media Lab
- 2002-2003 - Intel Fellow, MIT Media Lab
- 2000-2001 - Mitsubishi Electric Research Lab Fellow, MIT Media Lab
- 1999 - Honorable Mention, Computing Research Association Outstanding Undergraduate Award
- 1998 - Louis T. Rader Research Award, Department of Computer Science, University of Virginia
- 1996-1999 - Echols Scholar - University of Virginia
- 1995 - Rodman Scholar - University of Virginia
