= John Peel =

English DJ and radio presenter (1939–2004)

John Peel OBE
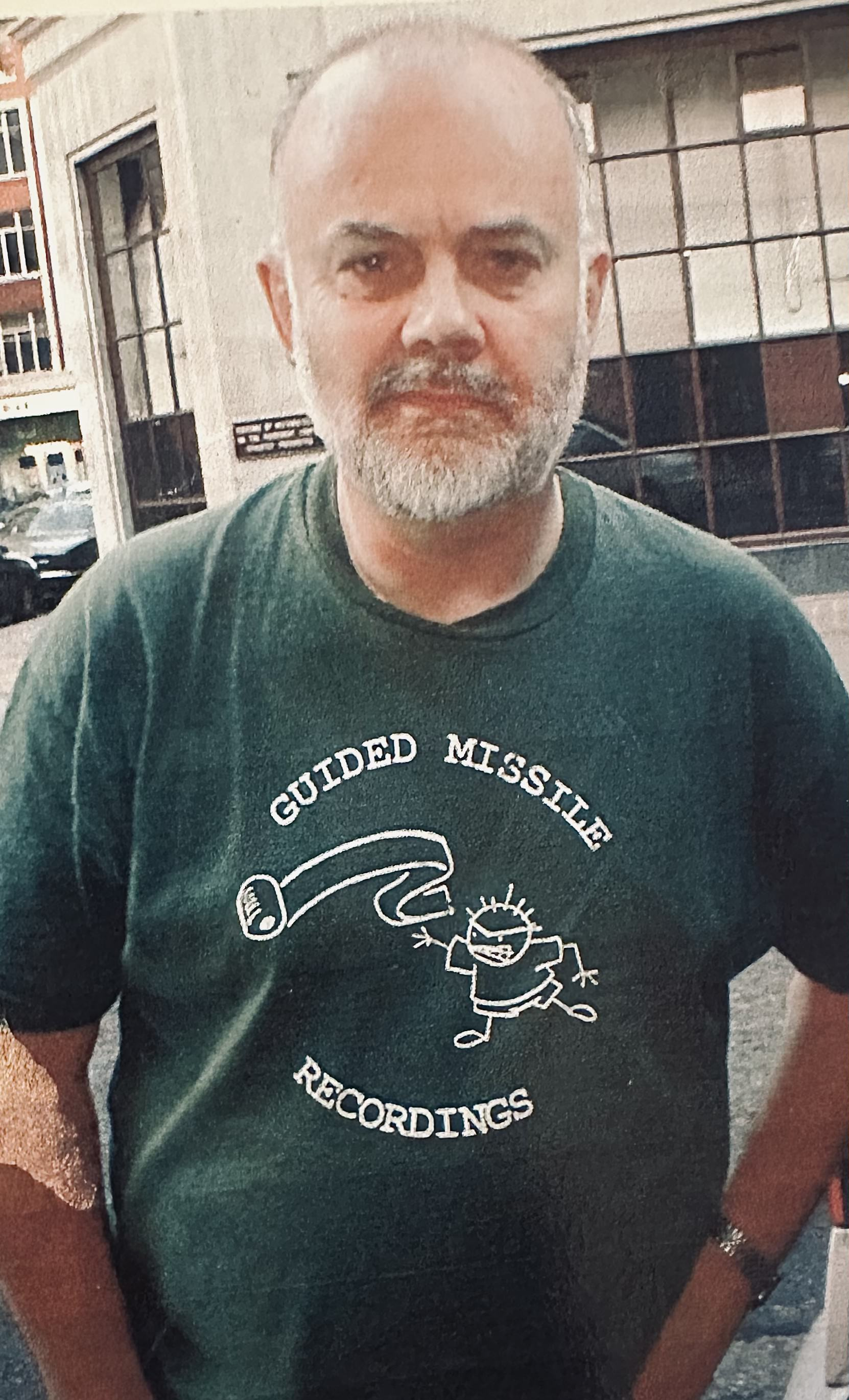
- Peel in London, 1999
- Born: John Robert Parker Ravenscroft; 30 August 1939; Heswall, England
- Died: 25 October 2004 (aged 65); Cusco, Peru
- Education: Shrewsbury School
- Occupations: Radio presenter; journalist
- Spouses: Shirley Anne Milburn (m. 1965; div. 1973); Sheila Gilhooly (m. 1974)
- Children: 4, including Tom

John Robert Parker Ravenscroft (30 August 1939 – 25 October 2004), better known as John Peel, was an English radio presenter and journalist. He was the longest-serving of the original disc jockeys on BBC Radio 1, broadcasting regularly from 1967 until his death in 2004.

Peel was one of the first broadcasters to play psychedelic rock and progressive rock records on British radio. He is widely acknowledged for promoting artists of many genres, including pop, dub reggae, punk rock and post-punk, electronic music and dance music, indie rock, extreme metal and UK rap. Fellow DJ Paul Gambaccini described Peel as "the most important single person in popular music from approximately 1967 through 1978. He broke more important artists than any individual."

Peel's Radio 1 shows included the regular "Peel Sessions", which usually consisted of four songs recorded by an artist in the BBC's studios, often providing the first major national coverage to bands that later achieved fame. The annual Festive Fifty countdown of his listeners' favourite records of the year was a notable part of his promotion of new music.

Peel appeared on television occasionally as one of the presenters of Top of the Pops in the 1980s, and provided voice-over commentary for a number of BBC programmes. He became popular with the audience of BBC Radio 4 for his Home Truths programme, which ran from the 1990s, featuring unusual stories from listeners' domestic lives.

== Early life ==
Peel was born John Robert Parker Ravenscroft at a nursing home in Heswall in Merseyside on 30 August 1939, the son of Joan Mary (née Swainson) and cotton merchant Robert Leslie Ravenscroft. He had two younger brothers and grew up in the nearby village of Burton. He was educated as a boarder at Shrewsbury School, where future Monty Python member Michael Palin was his contemporary. Peel said in his posthumously published autobiography that he was raped by an older pupil while at the school.

Peel was an avid radio listener and record collector from an early age, firstly of music offered by the American Forces Network and Radio Luxembourg. He recalled an early desire to host a radio programme of his own "so that I could play music that I heard and wanted others to hear". His housemaster, R. H. J. Brooke, whom Peel described as "extraordinarily eccentric" and "amazingly perceptive", wrote on one of his school reports, "Perhaps it's possible that John can form some kind of nightmarish career out of his enthusiasm for unlistenable records and his delight in writing long and facetious essays."

Peel completed his national service in 1959 in the Royal Artillery as a B2 radar operator. Afterwards, he worked as a mill operative at Townhead Mill in Rochdale and returned each weekend to Heswall on a scooter borrowed from his sister. While in Rochdale during the week, he stayed in a bed-and-breakfast in the area of Milkstone Road and Drake Street, and developed long-term associations with the town as the years progressed.

== Career ==
=== United States ===
In 1960, aged 21, Peel went to the United States to work for a cotton producer who had business dealings with his father. He took a number of other jobs afterwards, including working as a travelling insurance salesman. While in Dallas, Texas, where the insurance company he worked for was based, he conversed with the presidential candidate John F. Kennedy, and his running mate Lyndon B. Johnson, who were touring the city during the 1960 election campaign, and took photographs of them. Following Kennedy's assassination in November 1963, Peel passed himself off as a reporter for the Liverpool Echo in order to attend the arraignment of Lee Harvey Oswald. He and a friend can be seen in the footage of the 22/23 November midnight press conference at the Dallas Police Department when Oswald was paraded before the media. He later phoned in the story to the Echo.

While working for the insurance company, Peel wrote programs for punched card entry for an IBM 1410 computer (which led to his entry in Who's Who calling him a former computer programmer), and he got his first radio job working unpaid for WRR (AM) in Dallas. There, he presented the second hour of the Monday-night programme Kat's Karavan, which was primarily hosted by the American singer and radio personality Jim Lowe. Following this, and as Beatlemania hit the United States, Peel was hired by the Dallas radio station KLIF as the official Beatles correspondent on the strength of his connection to Liverpool. He later worked for KOMA in Oklahoma City, Oklahoma, until 1965, when he moved to KMEN in San Bernardino, California, and used his birth name, John Ravenscroft, to present the breakfast show.

=== Return to England ===
Peel returned to England in early 1967 and found work with the offshore British pirate radio station Radio London. He was offered the midnight-to-two shift, which gradually developed into a programme, The Perfumed Garden.

Peel's show was an outlet for the music of the UK underground scene. He played classic blues, folk music and psychedelic rock, with an emphasis on the new music emerging from Los Angeles and San Francisco. As important as the musical content of the programme was the personal – sometimes confessional – tone of Peel's presentation, and the listener participation it engendered. Underground events he had attended during his periods of shore leave, such as the UFO Club and the 14 Hour Technicolor Dream, together with causes célèbres like the drug busts of the Rolling Stones and John "Hoppy" Hopkins, were discussed between records. All this was far removed from Radio London's daytime format. Listeners sent Peel letters, poems and records from their own collections so that the programme became a vehicle for two-way communication; by the final week of Radio London he was receiving far more mail than any other DJ on the station.

Peel wrote a column, also The Perfumed Garden, for the underground newspaper the International Times, from August 1966 to April 1969.

=== BBC ===
When Radio London closed on 14 August 1967, Peel joined the BBC's new music station, BBC Radio 1, which was first broadcast on 30 September 1967. Unlike Big L, Radio 1 was not a full-time station but a broadcaster of a mixture of recorded music and live studio orchestras. Peel said he felt he was hired because the BBC "had no real idea what they were doing so they had to take people off the pirate ships because there wasn't anybody else". Peel presented a programme called Top Gear. At first he was obliged to share presentation duties with other DJs (Pete Drummond and Tommy Vance were among his co-hosts) but in February 1968 he was given sole charge of Top Gear. He presented the show until it ended in 1975.

In 1969, after hosting a trailer for a BBC programme on VD on his Night Ride programme, Peel received media attention because he divulged on air that he had become infected with a sexually transmitted disease earlier that year. This admission was later raised when he appeared as a defence witness in the 1971 Oz obscenity trial. The Night Ride programme, advertised by the BBC as an exploration of words and music, seemed to take up from where The Perfumed Garden had left off. It featured rock, folk, blues, classical and electronic music. A unique feature of the programme was the inclusion of tracks, mostly of exotic non-Western music, drawn from the BBC Sound Archive; the most popular of these were gathered on a BBC Records LP, John Peel's Archive Things (1970). In his sleeve notes to the LP, Peel calls the free-form nature of Night Ride his preferred radio format. Night Ride also featured poetry readings and numerous interviews with a wide range of guests, including his friends Marc Bolan, journalist and musician Mick Farren, poet Pete Roche, singer-songwriter Bridget St John and stars such as the Byrds, the Rolling Stones and John Lennon and Yoko Ono. The programme captured much of the creative activity of the underground scene. Its anti-establishment stance and unpredictability, however, did not find approval with the BBC hierarchy and it ended in September 1969 after 18 months.

=== Punk era ===
Peel's enthusiasm for music outside the mainstream occasionally brought him into conflict with the Radio 1 hierarchy. On one occasion, the station controller Derek Chinnery contacted John Walters and asked him to confirm that the show was not playing any punk, which he (Chinnery) had read about in the press and of which he disapproved. Chinnery was evidently somewhat surprised by Walters' reply that in recent weeks they had been playing little else.

In a 1990 interview, Peel recalled his 1976 discovery of the first album by New York punk band the Ramones as a seminal event,

At that time almost all the new bands comprised of people who had previously been in successful bands who had broken up then reformed... Well I played the first Ramones LP – it was identical to the first time I had heard Little Richard – the intensity was frightening! So I played five or six tracks on the next show and immediately I received mail from people demanding that I never play stuff like that again. Whenever that happens I always go in the opposite direction – so I played more and it was great! It was a classic case of changing courses in mid-stream and in a month the average age of the audience dropped by 10 years and the whole social class changed – which I was pleased about.

In 1979, Peel stated: "They leave you to get on with it. I'm paid money by the BBC not to go off and work for a commercial radio station ... I wouldn't want to go to one anyway, because they wouldn't let me do what the BBC let me do."

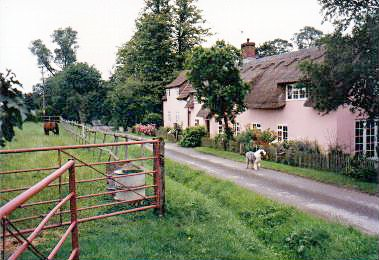
Peel Acres in Great Finborough, Suffolk

Peel's reputation as an important DJ who broke unsigned acts into the mainstream was such that young hopefuls sent him an enormous number of records, CDs, and tapes. When he returned home from a three-week holiday at the end of 1986 there were 173 LPs, 91 12"s and 179 7"s waiting for him. In 1983 Alan Melina and Jeff Chegwin, the music publishers for unsigned artist Billy Bragg, drove to the Radio 1 studios with a mushroom biryani and a copy of his record after hearing Peel mention that he was hungry; the subsequent airplay launched Billy Bragg's career.

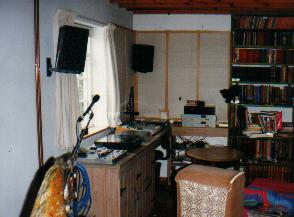
Studio at Peel Acres

In addition to his Radio 1 show, Peel broadcast as a disc jockey on the BBC World Service, on the British Forces Broadcasting Service (John Peel's Music on BFBS) for 30 years, VPRO Radio3 in the Netherlands, YLE Radio Mafia in Finland, Ö3 in Austria (Nachtexpress), and on Radio 4U, Radio Eins (Peel ...), and Radio Bremen (Ritz).

Peel was an occasional presenter of Top of the Pops on BBC1 from the late 1960s until the mid-1990s, and in particular from 1982 to 1987 when he appeared regularly. In 1971 he appeared not as presenter but performer, alongside Rod Stewart and the Faces, pretending to play mandolin on "Maggie May". He often presented the BBC's television coverage of music events, notably the Glastonbury Festival.

From 26 September to 31 October 1987, Peel produced a six-part radio series on BBC Radio 1 called Peeling Back the Years. In it, he discussed his life and career at length with his long-time producer John Walters and also played some of his favourite records. The show's theme music was "Blue Tango" by Ray Martin which, Peel revealed, was the first record he ever bought.

=== Later years ===
Between 1995 and 1997, Peel presented Offspring, a show about children, on BBC Radio 4. In 1998, Offspring grew into the magazine-style documentary show Home Truths. When he took on the job presenting the programme, which was about everyday life in British families, Peel requested that it be free from celebrities, as he found real-life stories more entertaining. Home Truths was described by occasional stand-in presenter John Walters as being "about people who had refrigerators called Renfrewshire". Peel also made regular contributions to BBC Two's humorous look at the irritations of modern life Grumpy Old Men. His only appearances in an acting role in film or television were in Harry Enfield's Smashie and Nicey: The End of an Era as John Past Bedtime, and in 1999 as a "grumpy old man who catalogues records" in the film Five Seconds to Spare. However, he had provided narration for others.

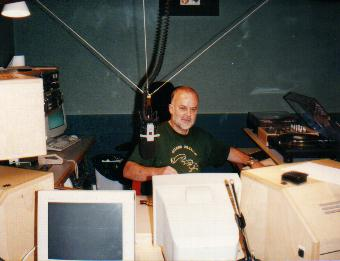
Peel at a Yalding House studio, 1997

Peel appeared as a celebrity guest on a number of TV shows, including This Is Your Life (1996, BBC), Travels With My Camera (1996, Channel 4 TV) and Going Home (2002, ITV TV), and presented the 1997 Channel 4 series Classic Trains. He was also in demand as a voice-over artist for television documentaries, such as BBC One's A Life of Grime.

In April 2003, the publishers Transworld successfully wooed Peel with a package worth £1.5 million for his autobiography, having placed an advert in a national newspaper aimed only at Peel. Unfinished at the time of his death, it was completed by Sheila and journalist Ryan Gilbey. It was published in October 2005 under the title Margrave of the Marshes. A collection of Peel's miscellaneous writings, The Olivetti Chronicles, was published in 2008.

== Personal life ==
=== Marriages ===
At the age of 25, while residing in Dallas in 1965, Peel married 15-year-old American girl Shirley Anne Milburn. The marriage was never happy, with reports that she was often violent towards him. Although she accompanied Peel back to England in 1967, they were soon separated and the divorce became final in 1973. In 1987, Milburn committed suicide.

Peel married Sheila Gilhooly on 31 August 1974. The reception was held at Regent's Park, with Rod Stewart as best man. In the 1970s, Peel and Gilhooly moved to "Peel Acres", a thatched cottage in Great Finborough. In later years, Peel broadcast many of his shows from a studio in the house, with Gilhooly and their children often being involved or at least mentioned. Peel's passion for Liverpool FC was reflected in his children's names: William Robert Anfield Ravenscroft (in reference to Anfield), Alexandra Mary Anfield Ravenscroft, Thomas James Dalglish Ravenscroft (in reference to Kenny Dalglish), and Florence Victoria Shankly Ravenscroft (in reference to Bill Shankly). Thomas, now better known as Tom Ravenscroft, also became a radio DJ.

=== Health problems ===
At the age of 62, in 2001, Peel was diagnosed with insulin-dependent diabetes following many years of fatigue.

=== Allegations of sexual misconduct ===
Writing in The Independent, Sarah Woolley and Fiona Sturges have questioned Peel's legacy due to sexual relations with underage fans. Frequently cited is his first marriage to Milburn in 1965; Milburn was aged 15 and Peel 25 when they married (which was legal in Texas at the time), and to which Peel maintained that her parents lied about her age.

In a 1989 interview with The Sunday Correspondent, Peel commented: "Girls used to queue up outside. By and large not usually for shagging. Oral sex they were particularly keen on, I remember. There was one extraordinary older woman – when I say older, I mean about 21 – came in and just climbed into bed with me. And we had a quick shag and she got dressed and went away again. So to go from years of self-abuse – I was unimaginably innocent by modern standards until I was 21 – to find yourself in that sort of position was like having all your masturbation fantasies becoming fact. But with it came dangers. One of my, er, regular customers, as it were, turned out to be 13, though she looked older. It became expedient to move to Oklahoma."

An interview originally published in The Herald in April 2004 stated that he admitted to sexual contact with "an awful lot" of underage girls. He said that, in the United States in the 1960s, the only available "pool of single, unconnected women was high school", as most women were married by the age of 20.

In 2012, a woman named Jane Nevin came forward stating that she had a three-month affair with Peel in 1969, when she was 15 and he was 30. She said they had unprotected sex; this was shortly after Peel discussed contracting a sexually transmitted disease. The relationship resulted in a "traumatic" abortion. She stated: "Looking back, it was terribly wrong and I was perhaps manipulated. But it was a different era." Two months after making her story public, Nevin contacted the BBC saying she regretted sharing it and wanting to put the record straight. She said that she had felt the need to share her story in the wake of the Jimmy Savile sexual abuse scandal, but in retrospect she felt her relationship with Peel was not abuse. In a video interview she stated that she had never told Peel her age, while providing a photo to show she looked much older than 15. She explained that she felt that she had been partially responsible for unfairly tarnishing Peel's name, stating: "it shouldn't be that way, he was marvellous... he was lovely to me."

In July 2022, a petition was launched to rename the "John Peel Stage" at the Glastonbury Festival, because of the accusations. In 2023, the stage was renamed "Woodsies". Emily Eavis, co-organiser of the festival, said the name change "was not related to a recent petition".

== Death ==
On 25 October 2004, during a working holiday in the Peruvian city of Cusco, Peel had a heart attack and died at the age of 65. Shortly after the announcement of his death, fans and supporters paid tribute to him. The following day, BBC Radio 1 cleared its schedule to broadcast a day of tributes. London's Evening Standard boards that afternoon read "the day the music died", quoting Don McLean's hit "American Pie".

Peel had often spoken of his eventual death. He once said on the Channel 4 miniseries Sounds of the Suburbs: "I've always imagined I'd die by driving into the back of a truck while trying to read the name on a cassette and people would say, 'He would have wanted to go that way.' Well, I want them to know that I wouldn't."

Peel once said that if he died before his producer John Walters, he wanted Walters to play Roy Harper's song "When an Old Cricketer Leaves the Crease". Walters had died in 2001, leaving Andy Kershaw to end his tribute programme to Peel on BBC Radio 3 with the song. Peel's stand-in on his Radio 1 slot, Rob da Bank, also played the song at the start of the final show before his funeral. Another time, Peel said he would like to be remembered with a gospel song. He stated that the final record he would play would be the C. L. Franklin sermon "Dry Bones in the Valley".

On his Home Truths BBC radio show, Peel once commented about his own death: "I definitely want to be buried, although not yet. I'm 61 on Wednesday—just a working day for me, I'm afraid—so actually I should have a mile or two left in me, but I do want the children to be able to stand solemnly at my graveside and think lovely thoughts along the lines of 'get out of that one, you swine', which they won't be able to do if I've been cremated."

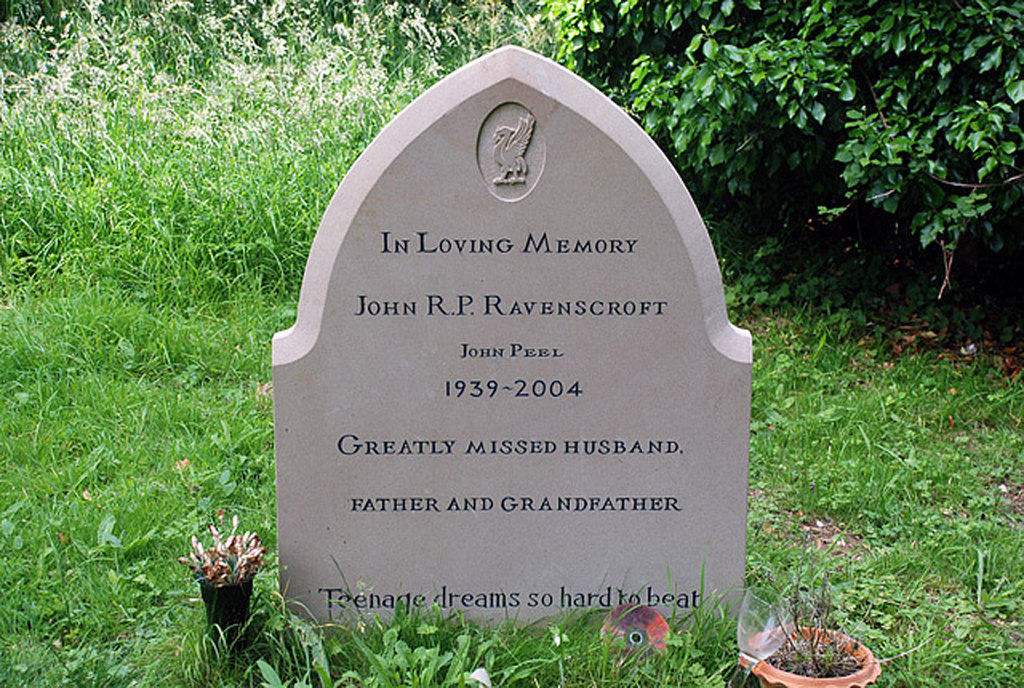
John Peel's grave

Peel's funeral took place in Bury St Edmunds on 12 November 2004 and was attended by more than 1,000 people, including many of the artists he had championed. Eulogies were read by his brother Alan and fellow DJ Paul Gambaccini. The service ended with clips of him talking about his life. His coffin was carried out to the accompaniment of his favourite song, the Undertones' "Teenage Kicks". Peel had written that, apart from his name, all he wanted on his gravestone were the "Teenage Kicks" lyrics "teenage dreams, so hard to beat". A headstone featuring the lyrics and the liver bird from his favourite football team, Liverpool FC, was placed at his grave in 2008. He was buried in the graveyard of St Andrew's Church in Great Finborough.

== Life in music ==
=== Peel Sessions ===
John Peel Sessions were a feature of his BBC Radio 1 shows, which usually consisted of four pieces of music pre-recorded at the BBC's studios. The sessions originally came about due to restrictions imposed on the BBC by the Musicians' Union and Phonographic Performance Limited which represented the record companies dominated by the EMI cartel.

Due to these restrictions, the BBC had been forced to hire bands and orchestras to render cover versions of recorded music. The theory behind this device was that it would create employment and force people to buy records and not listen to them free of charge on the air. One of the reasons why the offshore broadcasting stations of the 1960s were called "pirates" was because they operated outside of British laws and were not bound by the needle time restriction on the number of records they could play on the air.

The BBC employed its own house bands and orchestras and it also engaged outside bands to record exclusive tracks for its programmes in BBC studios. This was the reason why Peel was able to use "session men" in his own programmes. Sessions were usually four tracks recorded and mixed in a single day; as such they often had a rough-and-ready, demo-like feel, somewhere between a live performance and a finished recording. During the 37 years Peel remained on BBC Radio 1, more than 4,000 sessions were recorded by more than 2,000 artists. Many classic Peel Sessions have been released on record, particularly by the Strange Fruit label. In May 2020, an alphabetised catalogue of hundreds of classic Peel Sessions others had previously uploaded to YouTube was published.

=== Festive Fifty ===
The Festive Fifty, a countdown of the best tracks of the year as voted for by the listeners, was an annual tradition of Peel's Radio 1 show. Despite his eclectic playlist, it tended to be composed largely of "white boys with guitars", as Peel complained in 1988.

In 1991, the broadcast of the chart was cancelled, because it would be topped by Nirvana's "Smells Like Teen Spirit", and featured none of the dance music that Peel had favoured that year. This Phantom Fifty was eventually broadcast at the rate of one track per programme in 1993.

The 1997 chart was initially cancelled due to the lack of air-time Peel had been allocated for the period, but enough "spontaneous" votes were received over the phone that a Festive Thirty-One was compiled and broadcast.

Peel wrote that "The Festive 50 dates back to what was doubtless a crisp September morning in the early-to-mid Seventies, when John Walters and I were musing on life in his uniquely squalid office. In our waggish way, we decided to mock the enthusiasm of the Radio 1 management of the time for programmes with alliterative titles. Content, we felt, was of less importance than a snappy Radio Times billing. In the course of our historic meeting we had, I imagine, some fine reasons for dismissing the idea of a Festive 40 and going instead for a Festive 50, a decision that was to ruin my Decembers for years to come, condemning me to night after night at home with a ledger, when I could have been out and about having fun, fun, fun."

After his death, the Festive Fifty was continued on Radio 1 by Rob da Bank, Huw Stephens and Ras Kwame for two years, but then given to Peel-inspired Internet radio station Dandelion Radio, and continues to be compiled.

=== Dandelion Records and Strange Fruit ===
In 1969, Peel founded Dandelion Records, named after his pet hamster, so that he could release the debut album by Bridget St John, which he also produced. The label released 27 albums by 18 different artists before folding in 1972. Of its albums, There is Some Fun Going Forward was a sampler record intended to present its acts to a wide audience, but Dandelion was never a great success, with only two releases charting nationally: Medicine Head in the UK with "(And the) Pictures in the Sky" and Beau in Lebanon with "1917 Revolution". Having had an affinity with the Manchester area from working in a cotton mill in Rochdale in 1959, Peel signed Manchester bands Stack Waddy and Tractor to Dandelion and was always supportive of both bands throughout his life. It is alleged that Peel spotted a Rochdale postmark on the envelope containing the tape sent to him by Tractor, then called "The Way We Live".

Peel later said:

It was never a success financially. In fact, we lost money, if I remember correctly, on every single release bar one. I did quite like it but it was terribly indulgent. Not as indulgent as it would have been had I not had a business partner, admittedly ... I liked having a label. It enabled you to put out stuff that you liked without, in those days, having to worry about whether it was going to work commercially. I've never been a good business man.

Peel appeared on one Dandelion release: the David Bedford album Nurses Song with Elephants, recorded at the Marquee Studios, as part of a group playing twenty-seven plastic pipe twirlers on the track "Some Bright Stars for Queen's College".

In the 1980s, Peel set up Strange Fruit Records with Clive Selwood to release material recorded by the BBC for Peel Sessions.

=== Production (albums) ===
- 1969: Mike Hart Bleeds – Mike Hart
- 1969: The Year of the Great Leap Sideways – Occasional Word Ensemble
- 1969: Soundtrack – Principal Edwards Magic Theatre
- 1970: New Bottles Old Medicine – Medicine Head
- 1970: Burnin' Red Ivanhoe – Burnin' Red Ivanhoe (co-produced w/ Tony Reeves)
- 1972: Bugger Off! – Stack Waddy

John Peel is sometimes confused with the more prolific record producer Jonathan Peel, who was an in-house music producer for EMI before going freelance in 1970.

=== Favourite music ===
John Peel wrote in his autobiography, Margrave of the Marshes, that the band of which he owned the most records was the Fall. Regulars in the Festive 50, and easily recognised by vocalist Mark E. Smith's distinctive delivery, the Fall became synonymous with Peel's Radio 1 show through the 1980s and 1990s. Peel kept in contact with many of the artists he championed but only met Smith on two, apparently awkward, occasions.

The Misunderstood is the only band that Peel ever personally managed – he first met the band in Riverside, California in 1966 and convinced them to move to London. He championed their music throughout his career; in 1968, he described their 1966 single "I Can Take You to the Sun" as "the best popular record that's ever been recorded." and shortly before his death, he stated, "If I had to list the ten greatest performances I've seen in my life, one would be the Misunderstood at Pandora's Box, Hollywood, 1966 ... My god, they were a great band!"

His favourite single is widely known to have been "Teenage Kicks" by the Undertones; in an interview in 2001, he stated "There's nothing you could add to it or subtract from it that would improve it." In the same 2001 interview, he also listed "No More Ghettos in America" by Stanley Winston, "There Must Be Thousands" by the Quads and "Lonely Saturday Night" by Don French as being among his all-time favourites. He also described Lianne Hall as one of the great English voices.

In 1997, The Guardian asked Peel to list his top 20 albums. He chose Captain Beefheart's Trout Mask Replica as his number 1, having previously described it as "a work of art". His top 20 also included LPs by the Velvet Underground, the Ramones, Pulp, Misty in Roots, Nirvana, Neil Young, Pink Floyd, the Four Brothers, Dave Clarke, Richard and Linda Thompson, and the Rolling Stones.

A longer list of his favourite singles was revealed in 2005, when the contents of a wooden box in which he stored the records that meant the most to him were made public. The box was the subject of a television documentary, John Peel's Record Box. Out of 130 vinyl singles in the box, 11 of them were by the White Stripes, more than any other band in the box.

=== Awards and honorary degrees ===
Peel was 11 times Melody Maker's DJ of the year, Sony Broadcaster of the Year in 1993, winner of the publicly voted Godlike Genius Award from the NME in 1994, Sony Gold Award winner in 2002 and is a member of the Radio Academy Hall of Fame. At the NME awards in 2005, he was Hero of the Year and was posthumously given a special award for "Lifelong Service To Music". At the same event, the "John Peel Award For Musical Innovation" was awarded to the Others.

Peel received many honorary degrees, including an MA from the University of East Anglia, doctorates (Anglia Polytechnic University and Sheffield Hallam University), various degrees (University of Liverpool, Open University, University of Portsmouth, University of Bradford) and a fellowship of Liverpool John Moores University.

Peel was appointed an OBE in 1998, for his services to British music. In 2002, the BBC conducted a vote to discover the 100 Greatest Britons of all time, in which Peel was voted 43rd.

=== Various shows ===
Name of show	Radio station	First show	Last show	Frequency	Remarks
Kat's Karavan	WRR, Dallas	1961	?	weekly	unpaid
?	KLIF	?	?		
?	KOMA, Oklahoma City	?	?		
?	KLMA, Oklahoma City	?	?		
?	KMEN, San Bernardino	1966	1967		
The Perfumed Garden	Wonderful Radio London	ca 8 March 1967	14 August 1967		
Top Gear	BBC Radio 1	1967	1975		
Nightride	BBC Radio 1	6 March 1968	1969		
John Peel	BBC Radio 1	1975	2004		
Rock Today	BFBS Radio 1	April 1977	December 1979	weekly	
John Peel's Music on BFBS	BFBS Radio 1	Jan 1980	?	weekly	
?	DT64	?	?		
The John Peel Show: essentiële popmuziek zonder ondertiteling	VPRO Radio3	26 September 1984	24 September 1986	weekly	every Wednesday
?	Hansawelle	?	?		
John Peel	Radio Mafia, Helsinki	1990	2003		
John Peel Show	Rockradio, Finland	1987	1990		
?	YleX, Finland	2003	?		
?	Radio Bremen 2	1985	?		
?	Radio Bremen Vier	1987	?		
?	BBC Radio Cambridgeshire	1988	1990	weekly	
Nachtexpress	Hitradio Ö3	1989	1994	monthly	
Offspring	BBC Radio 4	1995	1997		
Peel	Radio Eins, Berlin	September 1997	18 December 2003	weekly	
Home Truths	BBC Radio 4	1998	16 October 2004		

== Legacy ==
In 2008, Merseytravel announced it would name a train after Peel. The John Peel Centre for Creative Arts opened in Stowmarket in early 2013. The main purposes of the centre is to serve as a live venue for music and performance and as a community meeting point. The 2005 Mogwai live compilation album Government Commissions: BBC Sessions 1996–2003 was dedicated to Peel as some of the tracks had been performed during the Peel Sessions. Peel's voice introduces the album's opening. On 8 October 2005, Cotswold Rail locomotive 47813 was named John Peel by Peel's widow Sheila at Bury St Edmunds station.

On 13 October 2005, the first "John Peel Day" was held to mark the anniversary of his last show. The BBC encouraged as many bands as possible to stage gigs on the 13th, and more than 500 gigs took place in the UK and as far away as Canada and New Zealand, from bands ranging from Peel favourites New Order and The Fall, to many new and unsigned bands. A second John Peel day was held on 12 October 2006, and a third on 11 October 2007. The BBC had originally planned to hold a John Peel Day annually, but Radio 1 has not held any official commemoration of the event since 2007, though gigs still took place around the country to mark the anniversary for a number of years afterwards.

In 2007, ambient duo Stars of the Lid released a tour EP ('Carte De Visite') with a track titled 'J.P.R.I.P' with a soundbyte of Peel during the intro. At the annual Gilles Peterson's Worldwide Awards, the "John Peel Play More Jazz Award" was named in his honour. In Peel's hometown of Heswall, a pub was opened in his honour in 2007. Named The Ravenscroft, the pub was converted from the old Heswall Telephone Exchange but has since been renamed. In 2012, Peel was among the British cultural icons selected by artist Peter Blake to appear in a new version of his most famous artwork – the Beatles' Sgt. Pepper's Lonely Hearts Club Band album cover.

Several Peel-related compilation albums have been released since his death, including John Peel and Sheila: The Pig's Big 78s: A Beginner's Guide, a project Peel started with his wife that was left unfinished when he died, and Kats Karavan: The History of John Peel on the Radio (2009), a 4-CD box set. Rock music critic Peter Paphides said in a review of the box set that "[s]ome artists remain forever associated with him", including ...And the Native Hipsters with "There Goes Concorde Again", and Ivor Cutler with "Jam". A sizable online community has also emerged dedicated to sharing recordings of his radio shows.

In 2011, BBC Music launched the John Peel Lectures, an annual series of lectures given by leading figures in music. In May 2012, a campaign was started to turn demolition-threatened Bradford Odeon into the John Peel Creative Arts Centre in the North, though this was ultimately unsuccessful.

=== Blue plaques ===
In 2009, blue plaques bearing Peel's name were unveiled at two former recording studios in Rochdale – one at the site of Tractor Sound Studios in Heywood, the other at the site of the Kenion Street Music Building – to recognise Peel's contribution to the local music industry.

In June 2017, Peel's widow Sheila unveiled a blue plaque in his honour in Great Finborough.

== See also ==
- List of Peel Sessions
- Alan Bangs
- John Peel Is Not Enough

== Bibliography ==
- Heatley, Michael (2004). John Peel : a life in music. London: Michael O'Mara. ISBN 978-1-84317-151-5. OCLC 56963874.
