= Mike Hart (singer-songwriter) =

English singer, songwriter and poet (1943 – 2016)

Michael William Hart (3 December 1943 – 22 June 2016) was an English singer-songwriter and poet.

In 1962, he founded the band The Roadrunners, before leaving in 1965 to join The Liverpool Scene, a poetry and music collective, with Adrian Henri, Andy Roberts, and Mike Evans. After recording one album with them he had a solo album, Mike Hart Bleeds, produced by John Peel, on Peel's Dandelion Records label.

He recorded a second solo album with Dandelion; Basher, Chalky, Pongo and Me.

In 1980 he began work on a third solo project. Five tracks were recorded, but none were released. They have been rediscovered, remastered, and put online.

He died on 22 June 2016 at the age of 72.

== Discography ==
=== with The Roadrunners ===
- "Twist Time im Star-Club Hamburg - 4" (Ariola S 71 225 IT), German release 1964
- "Rock Generation Vol. 5 – The First Rhythm & Blues Festival In England" (2 tracks from the band as ‘The Liverpool Roadrunners’) (BYG Records 529.705) French release 1964
- "The Roadrunners in Pantomania" EP (2 tracks by the Roadrunners, 1 track by Chris Edwards with the Roadrunners, 1 track by Chris Edwards & Clive Wood) (Cavern Sound 2BSN L7), Feb 1965
- "Star-Club Show 2" (Star-Club Records 148 001 STL), LP shared with Shorty & Them, German release 1965
- "Star-Club Show 2" CD release (Repertoire Records IMS 7014) 1994 CD release features original album plus tracks from Rock Generation Vol. 5 and Pantomania EP

=== with The Liverpool Scene ===
- "The Amazing Adventures Of …" (RCA Records SF 7995), 1968
- "Heirloon” (RCA Records SF8134), 1970
- "The Amazing Adventures Of … The Liverpool Scene" (Compilation Double-CD release 2009 on Esoteric Recordings ECLEC22138 featuring non-album tracks)

=== Mike Hart ===
- "Mike Hart Bleeds" (Dandelion Records S 63756), 1969
- "Basher, Chalky, Pongo And Me" (Dandelion Records 2310 211), 1972 (released as ‘Mike Hart & Comrades’)
- "Son, Son" / "Bad News Man" (Deram Records DM 409), 1974 single
- "The Lost Sessions" (Five tracks recorded 1980 for a possible new album; not released on record but remastered and put online for free download)
