= Bridget St John =

English singer-songwriter and guitarist (born 1946)

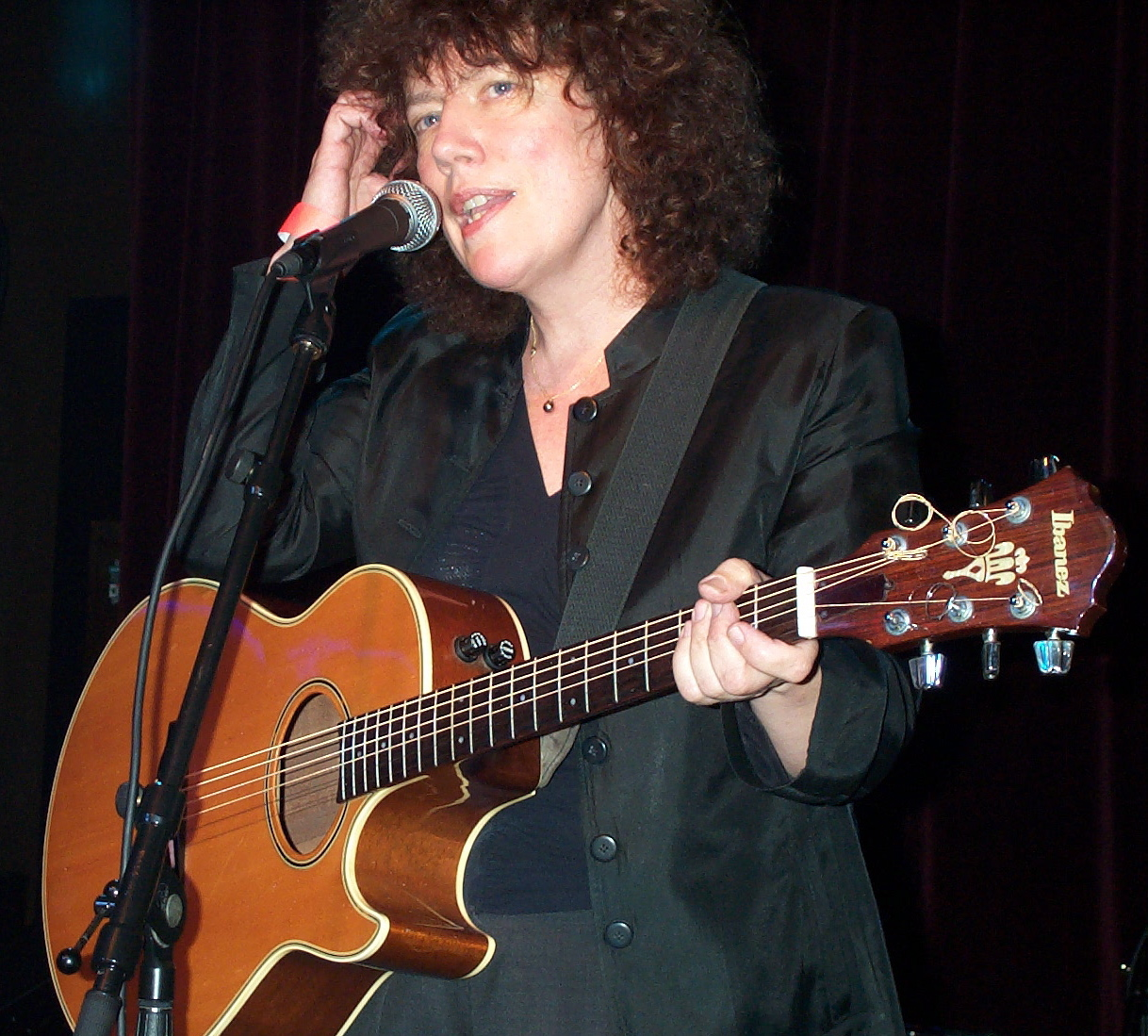
- St John in 2003

Background information
- Born: Bridget Anne Hobbs; 4 October 1946 (age 80); East Molesey, Surrey, England
- Genres: Folk; folk rock
- Occupations: Singer, guitarist, songwriter
- Instruments: Vocals, guitar
- Years active: 1968–1976; 1999–present
- Labels: Dandelion; Chrysalis

Bridget St John (born Bridget Anne Hobbs; 4 October 1946) is an English singer-songwriter and guitarist. She is best known for the three albums she recorded between 1969 and 1972 for John Peel's Dandelion record label. Peel produced her debut album, Ask Me No Questions. She also recorded a large number of BBC Radio and Peel sessions and toured regularly on the British college and festival circuit.

St John appeared at leading folk venues in the UK, along with other folk and pop luminaries of the time such as Nick Drake, Paul Simon, and David Bowie, among others. In 1974 she was voted fifth most popular female singer in that year's Melody Maker readers poll. Blessed with a "rich cello-like" vocal style, she is also an accomplished guitar player who credits John Martyn and Michael Chapman as her "musical brothers".

== Biography ==
=== Early life ===
St John was born on 4 October 1946 in East Molesey, Surrey, England. She grew up in a musical household where her mother and sisters were all accomplished pianists. She took piano lessons at her mother's behest, but she did not get along with her teacher and quit when she was 11. After studying the viola for two years and then the trumpet for two years, St John bought a guitar with £20 her grandmother gave her shortly before she finished high school. Her first performances were at Sheffield University in 1964–5, and her very first "proper gig" was at a pub in Rotherham. In 1967, St John spent three months in Aix-en-Provence as part of her French studies. During this period she met American singer-songwriter Robin Frederick.

=== Solo career, 1968–1974 ===
When it was time to return to England, St John travelled back to London with Robin Frederick. It was through Frederick that St John met John Martyn when he was living in Richmond. He was instrumental in getting St John's music out to a larger audience. In 1968, a poet friend of theirs, Pete Roche, put St John in touch with John Peel for his "Nightride" radio show. St John's first recording sessions for Peel were recorded by Al Stewart in 1968 on Stewart's ReVox. The four songs she recorded were released on John Peel Presents Top Gear, Peel's 1969 compilation of BBC demos. The four songs were: "The River" (written by Martyn), "Song To Keep You Company" (written by St John), "Night In The City" (written by Joni Mitchell), and "Lazarus" (traditional).

Peel and Clive Selwood formed Dandelion initially to release St John's music. St John's 1969 debut album for Dandelion, Ask Me No Questions, was produced by Peel and recorded in nine to ten hours. "Curl Your Toes" and "Ask Me No Questions" featured Martyn on second guitar. Richie Unterberger reviewing for AllMusic called the album "music for wandering through meadows on overcast days".

In 1970, St John recorded a vocal duet with Kevin Ayers on "The Oyster and the Flying Fish" for his Shooting at the Moon release. Her second album, Songs for the Gentle Man, was produced by Ron Geesin and released in 1971. This album was a significant step up from her debut, and contained string arrangements mostly by Geesin himself, particularly striking on the opening track "A Day A Way" and "Seagull- Sunday." Her third album Thank You For..., released in 1972, was even more ambitious and used more musicians with a folk-rock sound. The album was her last album for John Peel's Dandelion label, however, which folded due to its artists' lack of commercial success. St John's adventurous fourth album Jumblequeen, released through Chrysalis Records in 1974, garnered critical praise in Spare Rib.

=== Later years, 1975–present ===
St John emigrated to Greenwich Village in 1976 and virtually disappeared from the public eye for over 20 years. She took part in the Strawbs 25th Anniversary festival held in 1993. St John released a 'come-back' album in 1996, Take The Fifth and appeared at a Nick Drake tribute concert in New York City in 1999. She toured Japan in 2006 with the minimalist French musician Colleen, and appeared with the Electric Strawbs in the B.B. King Blues Club and Grill (NYC) on 27 June 2007.

Aside from work under her own name, St John has recorded with Mike Oldfield on his albums Ommadawn (1975) and Amarok (1990), and with Kevin Ayers and Robin Frederick. In 2007 she reunited with Ayers to record "Baby Come Home" on his album The Unfairground.

In 2008 she married Gordon Edwards, who served as the bass player for the 1970s jazz-funk band Stuff.

St John has toured with Michael Chapman, and in 2016 she recorded with Chapman for his 50 release.

She was described by John Peel as "the best lady singer-songwriter in the country".

St John's song Back to Stay is the opening credits soundtrack of the 2017 Korean film The Cage by Iranian-German director Lior Shamriz, lip-synced by queer Korean drag queen.

St John recorded the song "Fly" for Mojo magazine's Nick Drake compilation album, Green Leaves: Nick Drake Covered (cover dated March 2018).

St John supported Will Sheff (Okkervil River) on the song "Tommy McHugh" released in 2023.

== Discography ==
=== Albums ===
- Ask Me No Questions (Dandelion) 1969
- Songs for the Gentle Man (Dandelion) 1971
- Thank You For... (Dandelion) 1972 [reissued in 1995 on See For Miles with eight bonus tracks, recorded live at Montreux, Switzerland, 28 April 1972. Released in 2005 on Cherry Red with 10 bonus tracks, eight of which are the live Montreux recordings]
- Jumblequeen (Chrysalis) 1974 [reissued in 1995 on BGO with four bonus tracks. Reissued in 2006 on Hux with three bonus tracks]

=== Compilation and live albums ===
- John Peel Presents Top Gear (BBC) 1969 includes four tracks by Bridget St John
- Take the 5ifth (The Road Goes On Forever) 1996
- BBC Radio 1968–1976 (Hux) 2010 – 2 CDs
- Hello Again: A Collection Of Rare Tracks (P-Vine) 2010
- A Pocketful of Starlight: Best Of Bridget St John (Cherry Red) 2013
- Dandelion Albums & BBC Recordings (Cherry Red) 2015 – four CDs (first three albums plus BBC Recordings 1968–1972)
- Fly High: A Collection of Album Highlights, Singles and B-Sides, Demos, Live Recordings, Sessions and Interviews (Cherry Red) 2016 – Double CD
- From There/To Here: UK/US Recordings 1974–1982 (Cherry Red) August 26, 2022 – 3 CDs: Jumblequeen (with bonus tracks), Take The 5ifth (with bonus tracks), New York Sessions (previously unreleased).
