= Truly, Madly, Deeply Vale =

Cover of 2007 DVD

Truly, Madly, Deeply Vale is a 2004 television documentary produced by David Nolan for Granada Television, about the history of the Deeply Vale Festivals which ran from 1976 to 1979 in the North West of England. The programme makers tracked down many of the musicians who played there, including Mark E. Smith of the Fall, Steve Hillage and Vini Reilly of the Durutti Column. The hour-long programme is an elaborate pastiche of the film Woodstock and is largely presented in split-screen. It follows the efforts of festival organisers as they attempted a Glastonbury for the north, while the British musical landscape was changing from progressive rock to punk. It was narrated by Bob Harris, former presenter of The Old Grey Whistle Test, and has since been released on DVD in a much extended form as the 3 hours plus the Deeply Vale Festivals DVD.
