= David Bedford =

English composer and musician (1937–2011)

- Born: David Vickerman Bedford; 4 August 1937; Hendon, Middlesex, England
- Died: 1 October 2011 (aged 74)
- Occupations: Composer; musician; conductor; teacher
- Website: web.archive.org/web/20081230141300/http://www.impulse-music.co.uk/davidbedford/

David Vickerman Bedford (4 August 1937 – 1 October 2011) was an English composer and musician. He wrote and played both popular and classical music. He was the brother of the conductor Steuart Bedford, the grandson of the composer, painter and author Herbert Bedford and the composer Liza Lehmann, and the son of Leslie Bedford, an inventor, and Lesley Duff, a soprano opera singer.

From 1969 to 1981, Bedford was Composer in Residence at Queen's College, London. From 1968 to 1980, he taught music in a number of London secondary schools. In 1996 he was appointed Composer in Association with the English Sinfonia. In 2001 he was appointed Chairman of the Performing Right Society, having previously been Deputy chairman.

== Early life and career ==
Bedford was born in Hendon, London to Leslie Bedford, the director of engineering for the guided weapons division of the British Aircraft Corporation, and Lesley Duff, a soprano singer who worked with the English Opera Group. He was educated at Lancing College in West Sussex. When he was 19, he acted as a conscientious objector in lieu of performing national service, which was still mandatory in Britain at the time. During this time he worked as a porter at Guy's Hospital, London.

Bedford studied music at the Royal Academy of Music under Lennox Berkeley, and later in Venice under Luigi Nono. His studies and early influences included the work of Nono, Paul Hindemith, Arnold Schoenberg and Anton Webern. In the mid-60s, he was a music teacher at Whitefield school in Hendon, before joining Queen’s College in London as composer in residence in 1969.

Bedford was a former president of the Severnside Composers' Alliance and a founding Trustee of the PRS for Music Foundation, which supports the composition of new pieces.

== Recording and arranging ==
In 1969, Bedford was engaged to orchestrate Kevin Ayers' album Joy of a Toy, on which he also played keyboards. This led to his role as keyboard player for Ayers' band, Kevin Ayers and the Whole World, who recorded one album, Shooting at the Moon (1970). On that album, in addition to organ and piano, Bedford plays accordion, marimbaphone and guitar. Bedford also contributed to later Kevin Ayers albums as keyboard player and orchestral arranger.

Bedford's work with The Whole World led to collaborations with the group's saxophonist Lol Coxhill, with whom he formed the Coxhill-Bedford Duo. The Duo released several singles of old vaudeville and British music hall songs featuring Bedford on piano and lead vocal, and Coxhill on saxophone and second vocal, for John Peel's Dandelion Records label in the early 1970s. One of these singles was released under the pseudonym, Will Dandy and the Dandylettes (covering a medley of Al Jolson songs), with the B-side credited to the Coxhill-Bedford Duo. More tracks by the Duo appear on Coxhill's solo album, Ear of Beholder (1971) on which they play three songs, including an early version of "Don Alfonso" which Bedford would record again later. Still more Coxhill-Bedford Duo songs can be found on Banana Follies, a 1972 BBC concert radio broadcast featuring Kevin Ayers, released on CD in 1998. In that broadcast, Bedford and Coxhill also perform a short radio play titled "Murder in the Air". Coxhill later re-recorded the play without Bedford and released it as a 12-inch single, stating in the liner notes that he would have preferred to record it with Bedford, who was unavailable.

The first album to consist entirely of David Bedford compositions was Nurses Song with Elephants, recorded at the Marquee Studios, and released in 1972 on John Peel's Dandelion label. On this album, Bedford mixed classical ensemble with poems and voices. Some Bright Stars for Queen's College uses twenty-seven plastic pipe twirlers, John Peel himself being among the pipe twirler players. There are five tracks on the album: It's Easier Than It Looks, Nurses Song With Elephants, Some Bright Stars for Queen's College, Trona (1967), and Sad and Lonely Faces. Bass guitar on the title song is played by Mike Oldfield and the final track features a poem by Kenneth Patchen that is sung by Kevin Ayers.

Bedford collaborated even more extensively with Mike Oldfield, The Whole World's bass guitarist. He orchestrated and conducted Oldfield's The Orchestral Tubular Bells album (1975), an adaptation of Tubular Bells, the record that had given the Virgin record label its first major success in 1973. Bedford also orchestrated Oldfield's follow-up album-length composition, Hergest Ridge (1974) as The Orchestral Hergest Ridge, which was performed live and recorded for radio broadcast from concert performances twice, once in 1974 by the Royal Philharmonic Orchestra with Steve Hillage on guitar, and once in 1976 by the Scottish National Orchestra, again with Hillage on guitar, although Andy Summers had played on other performances that year. The latter recording was acquired by Virgin, but not released as an album, although portions of it were used in The Space Movie (1979), which featured Oldfield's music.

Bedford provided vocals and piano for Oldfield's cover versions of more old music hall numbers (in the manner of the now-defunct Coxhill-Bedford Duo), Don Alfonso (1974) and Speak (Tho' You Only Say Farewell) (1976), collaborated with Oldfield on a piece titled "First Excursion" for Oldfield's box set compilation Boxed, and orchestrated Oldfield's soundtrack for The Killing Fields (1984). In 1983, Oldfield created a short-lived record label called Oldfield Music whose sole release was a David Bedford album, Star Clusters, Nebulae and Places in Devon / The Song of the White Horse.

Bedford's association with Oldfield led to a record contract to make a number of albums for Virgin, some using orchestral players, others featuring Bedford's keyboards, and some include Oldfield as a featured performer. Album titles from this period include Star's End (1974), The Rime of the Ancient Mariner (1975, a musical setting of the poem by Samuel Taylor Coleridge), The Odyssey (1976, a musical setting of the poem by Homer), and Instructions for Angels (1977), the latter including an appearance by Mike Ratledge.Instructions For Angels was broadcast live by the BBC and featured Dave Lawson on Melotron along with a section of wine glass rims being played.

Bedford contributed to records by the Edgar Broughton Band, including a single titled Up Yours!, a polemic on the 1970 UK general election declaring their intention to drop out. The single features a string arrangement by Bedford.

Bedford worked on several Roy Harper projects, including the 1971 four-song album Stormcock which also featured Jimmy Page on guitar (credited as S. Flavius Mercurius for contractual reasons), and the 1974 album Valentine. Bedford also conducted an orchestra during Harper's live concerts, including the Valentine's Day launch of the album, the concert later released as Flashes from the Archives of Oblivion and featuring, among others, Keith Moon. In 2001 he was reunited with Harper when the latter celebrated his 60th birthday with a concert at London's Royal Festival Hall, joined by numerous guest artists, including Jeff Martin and John Renbourn. A recording of the concert Royal Festival Hall Live – June 10th 2001 was released as a double CD shortly afterwards.

He also worked with a wide variety of other artists, including A-ha, Billy Bragg, Camel, Elvis Costello, Frankie Goes to Hollywood, Madness, Andy Summers, Alan White (drummer for Yes) and Robert Wyatt.

== Avant-garde classical compositions ==
Bedford was also known for his avant-garde classical works. His 1963 Piece for Mo was described as "his first work of standing", although it was never recorded for release. In 1965 he composed a chamber work for soprano and septet called Music For Albion Moonlight, based on poems by Kenneth Patchen. He continued to set music to Patchen's poems throughout his career, including O Now the Drenched Land Wakes and The Great Birds, released by Deutsche Grammophon on one of their Avant Garde series of albums in 1968, and Instructions For Angels, released by Virgin in 1977.

He also composed a number of works for wind orchestra, beginning with Sun Paints Rainbows on the Vast Waves in 1982, commissioned by the Huddersfield Contemporary Music Festival. Many of these works have recorded by the wind orchestra of the Royal Northern College of Music, conducted by Clark Rundell, released by Doyen Records UK in 1998.

Bedford is noted for the large amount of educational music he wrote for children. The musical notation he used was often unconventional, frequently making use of graphics, thus letting his works be performed by children and others who cannot read conventional notation. In the liner notes to the album Viola Today (1974) by Karen Phillips, it is stated that in the score of Bedford's Spillihpnerak (1972) there is "(a) page consisting of a drawing of a lysozyme molecule which the performer is asked to interpret".

Bedford took a similar approach for his 1972 work, With 100 Kazoos, in which an instrumental ensemble is joined by the audience who are invited to play kazoos. The audience members were presented with various space-themed illustrations, and asked to interpret them using their kazoos. The piece was intended to be conducted by Pierre Boulez, but he rejected it, with Bedford stating "He rejected my piece on the grounds that audiences would be stupid and would fool about with their kazoos in the other pieces too".

Bedford composed a 35-minute choral suite, commissioned by the BBC, "Twelve Hours of Sunset", based on Roy Harper's song of the same name, from his 1974 album Valentine, which Bedford orchestrated. The suite was given its live premiere at the Royal Albert Hall, London on 8 August 1975, by the BBC Singers, BBC Choral Society and BBC Symphony Orchestra, with Simon Lindley on organ, conducted by John Poole, as part of the 75th Proms. Another performance for BBC Radio was on 29 August 1997, on BBC Radio 3, by the Crouch End Festival Chorus and BBC Symphony Orchestra, with Jacques van Steen conducting, as part of a 60th birthday tribute to Bedford, who was also interviewed.

He continued to combine skilled and non-skilled musicians in other works such as Seascapes (1986), combining a full symphony orchestra with school children, and Stories from the Dreamtime (1991), written for 40 deaf children and orchestra, as well as unconventional performance techniques such as requiring a singer to scream into a piano. The score to The Song of the White Horse (1978) instructs the choir to inhale helium gas to be able to reach the highest notes near the end of the piece.

Science fiction was a repeated area of interest for Bedford. The Tentacles of the Dark Nebula has words taken from Arthur C. Clarke's short story Transcience, recorded by tenor Peter Pears with Bedford conducting the London Sinfonietta. The title of Star's End was taken from Isaac Asimov's book Second Foundation. Rigel 9 is a play based on the book by Ursula K. Le Guin, featuring background music composed and recorded by Bedford.

Bedford's music has been described as modernist, avant-garde and experimental. He was known for his use of atonality, harmonic stasis, and rich timbre.

== Personal life ==
Bedford enjoyed sci-fi, was a keen astronomer and enjoyed cricket, all of which inspired his work. Bedford died of lung cancer in October 2011 and was survived by his third wife, his seven children, and his brother Steuart. Steuart died in 2021.

After his death, a number of commemorative performances took place, including one of his later works for children The Wreck of the Titanic which was performed nine times at venues across England during early 2012. The performance at the SAGE Gateshead included choirs from four North East primary/junior schools. In November 2018 BBC Radio 3 broadcast a recording of a concert performed by the BBC Concert Orchestra, conducted by Michael Seal, marking what would have been Bedford's 80th year. The programme included his orchestration of Mike Oldfield's Tubular Bells, with Steve Hillage on guitar, his 1981 reworking of his Alleluia Timpanis, and his Symphony No. 1.
