= See for Miles Records =

Former British record label

See for Miles Records (SFM) was a British record label that specialised in reissuing rock classics. It was one of the first British re-issue specialists predating the emergence of compact discs.

See for Miles reissued "oldies", including most of the records of many labels such as Dandelion Records on CD in the 1990s. The label reissued 56 Ventures albums on 28 CDs.

== Operations ==
The name hints both to its co-owner Colin Miles and The Who's "I Can See for Miles".

Mark Rye, known for managing Bill Nelson, joined See for Miles just as CDs were becoming popular, and started Magpie as its authorised mail-order company, in 1990. He had previously worked with Colin Miles at EMI. One of his business partners was Steve Waters.

== Legacy ==
The company went into administration and in 2007 the label rights were sold to Phoenix Music International.

Rye and Waters went on to work on the Rockhistory.co.uk series, filming British Invasion bands, and issuing a CD series called Extended Play.

== See also ==
- Lists of record labels
