= Dandelion Records =

British record label

Dandelion
- Founded: 18 July 1969
- Founder: John Peel
- Status: Defunct as of late 1972
- Country of origin: Britain

Dandelion Records was a British record label started on 18 July 1969 by the British DJ John Peel.

== History ==
The label was started as a way to get the music Peel liked onto record. Peel was responsible for "artistic direction" and the commercial side was handled by Clive Selwood of Elektra Records and his wife Shirley. Peel wrote:

The half-witted, idealistic notion behind Dandelion and our other violent, capitalist enterprise, Biscuit Music, is that any profits, if such there be, should go to the artists, not to Clive nor myself.

Dandelion and the sister publishing company Biscuit were named after Peel's hamsters at the suggestion of his then flatmate Marc Bolan.

Around twenty eight albums were released by the label. One album was by Gene Vincent, with a cast of musicians including members of The Byrds and Steppenwolf. Others were by younger or non-commercial artists, including Beau, Bridget St John, Medicine Head, Clifford T. Ward, David Bedford, Lol Coxhill, Stack Waddy, Tractor, Kevin Coyne/Siren, and Denmark's Burnin' Red Ivanhoe.

The only record ever to make the UK Singles Chart was "(And The) Pictures in the Sky" by Medicine Head, which reached #22 in 1971. Beau's "1917 Revolution" made #1 in the Lebanon in 1969.

Dandelion Records were distributed by, successively, CBS Records, Warner Bros. Records and Polydor. The label ran until late 1972 when it started to try to place its artists with other labels as its distribution via Polydor had ceased. It had issued about a dozen singles and two dozen albums. Several releases attracted a cult audience but never quite crossed into the mainstream, although one of the last singles, Clifford T. Ward's 'Coathanger', from his debut album 'Singer Songwriter', attracted a certain amount of airplay on Radio 1. Both Tractor and Medicine Head appeared fairly high in various album charts- Medicine Head would go on to appear on Top of the Pops and Tractor would get heavily involved in the hippy festival circuit which they still make rare appearances on to this day. As Peel himself told Record Collector in 1994, 'when you can't afford full-page ads in the music press, artists become very resentful...there's no faster way of losing friends.'

One of the most curious albums issued by the label was a sampler, There is Some Fun Going Forward.

Most Dandelion recordings have been reissued on vinyl and/or CD. A batch of half a dozen came out on CD on Repertoire Records in the early 1990s, followed by the whole catalogue as two-on-one CDs by See For Miles Records in the mid-1990s.

Individual albums have been licensed around the world, with major catalogue releases since 2005 on Cherry Red Records in the UK and Airmail Archive Recordings in Japan. Cherry Red acquired the entire catalogue of original Dandelion Records recordings (excluding Tractor / The Way We Live) in September 2009. The UK trade mark Dandelion Records and its Dandelion flower logo are the intellectual property of Ozit Morpheus Records who have released new recordings under the Dandelion Records brand.

The Dandelion Records by Tractor and The Way We Live were reissued in the 2000s by Ozit Morpheus Records, as was a six-hour DVD about John Peel and some of the artists on Dandelion Records. This was released as a tribute to John in November 2008. It includes a contribution from his wife Sheila Ravenscroft.

== Discography ==
=== Albums ===
- 63750: Bridget St John – Ask Me No Questions
- S63751: Beau – Beau
- 63752: Principal Edwards Magic Theatre – Soundtrack
- 63753: Occasional Word Ensemble – The Year of the Great Leap Sideways
- 63754: Gene Vincent – I'm Back and I'm Proud
- 63755: Siren – Siren
- 63756: Mike Hart – Mike Hart Bleeds
- 63757: Medicine Head – New Bottles Old Medicine
- DAN8001/K49001: Siren – Strange Locomotion
- DAN8002/K49002: Principal Edwards Magic Theatre – The Asomoto Running Band
- DAN8003/K49003: Stack Waddy – Stack Waddy
- DAN8004/K49004: The Way We Live – A Candle for Judith
- DAN8005/K49005: Medicine Head – Heavy on the Drum
- DAN8006/K49006: Beau – Creation (With The Way We Live)
- DAN8007/K49007: Bridget St John – Songs for the Gentle Man
- DSD8008/K69001: Lol Coxhill – Ear of Beholder
- 2310145: Burnin' Red Ivanhoe – WWW
- 2310146: Supersister – To the Highest Bidder
- 2310165: David Bedford – Nurses Song with Elephants
- 2310166: Medicine Head – Dark Side of the Moon
- 2310193: Bridget St John – Thank You For
- 2310211: Mike Hart – Basher Chalky Pongo and Me (as Mike Hart & the Comrades)
- 2310216: Clifford T. Ward – Singer Songwriter
- 2310217: Tractor – Tractor
- 2310228: Kevin Coyne – Case History (1972)
- 2310231: Stack Waddy – Bugger Off!
- 2485021: Various artists – There is Some Fun Going Forward (sampler album)

=== Singles ===
- 4403: Beau – "1917 Revolution" / "Sleeping Town"
- 4404: Bridget St John – "To B Without A Hitch" / "Autumn Lullaby"
- 4405: Principal Edwards Magic Theatre – "Ballad of the Big Girl Now" / "Lament for Earth"
- 4493: Clague - "Mandy Lee" / "Bottle Up and Go" (With Kevin Coyne)
- 4494: Coyne-Clague – "The Stride" / "I Wonder Where"
- S 4596: Gene Vincent – "Be-Bop-A-Lula '69" / "Ruby Baby"
- 4661: Medicine Head – "His Guiding Hand" / "This Love of Old"
- 4781: Mike Hart – "Yawney Morning Song" / "Almost Liverpool 8"
- 4786: Bill Oddie – "On Ilkla Moor Baht 'at" / "Harry Krishna"
- S 4974: Gene Vincent – "White Lightning" / "Scarlet Ribbons (For Her Hair)"
- S 5075: Medicine Head – "Coast to Coast" / "All for Tomorrow"
- S 5119: Stack Waddy – "Roadrunner" / "Kentucky"
- DAN7002/K19004: Siren – "Strange Locomotion" / "I'm All Aching"
- DAN7003/K19002: Medicine Head – "(And The) Pictures in the Sky" / "Natural Sight"
- DAN7004/K19003: Yamasukis – "Yamasuki" / "Aieaoa"
- 2001276: Medicine Head – "Kum On" / "On the Land"
- 2001282: Tractor – "Stoney Glory" / "Marie" / "As You Say"
- 2001325: Medicine Head – "Only To Do What Is True" / "Sittin' in the Sun"
- 2001327: Clifford T. Ward – "Carrie" / "Sidetrack"
- 2001331: Stack Waddy – "You Really Got Me" / "Willie the Pimp"
- 2001357: Kevin Coyne – "Cheat Me" / "Flowering Cherry"
- 2001382: Clifford T Ward – "Coathanger" / "Rayne"
- 2001383: Medicine Head – "How Does It Feel" / "Morning Light"
- 2058214: Coxhill Bedford Duo – "Mood" / "Sonny Boy" / "Oh Mein Papa" (B-side by Will Dandy & the Dandylettes)

== See also ==
- Lists of record labels

== Bibliography ==
- Peel, John; Ravenscroft, Sheila (2005). Margrave of the Marshes. London: Bantam Press. ISBN 0-593-05252-8.
- Selwood, Clive (2003). All the Moves But None of the Licks: Secrets of the Record Business. London: Peter Owen. ISBN 978-0-7206-1153-3.
