= State of Grace =

State of Grace may refer to:

== Religion ==
- State (religious life), religious classification of humanity
- State (theology) of being in God's grace in Christian theology

== Film and television ==
- State of Grace (TV series), an American sitcom
- State of Grace (1990 film), a 1990 American crime film directed by Phil Joanou
- State of Grace (1986 film), a 1986 French drama romance film
- States of Grace, a 2005 film directed by Richard Dutcher

== Music ==
- State of Grace (band), a hardcore punk band from Santa Cruz, California
- State of Grace, a 90s ambient electronica/pop band previously known as Fatal Charm

=== Albums ===
- State of Grace (album), a 2008 album by the Street Dogs
- State of Grace, a 2000 album by Paul Schwartz
- State of Grace, a 2007 album by The Holmes Brothers

=== Songs ===
- "State of Grace" (song), a 2012 song by Taylor Swift
- "State of Grace", by Billy Joel from the album Storm Front, 1989
- "State of Grace", by Nomeansno from the album The Worldhood of the World (As Such), 1995
- "State of Grace", by Patti Scialfa from the album 23rd St. Lullaby, 2004
- "State of Grace", by Talib Kweli from the album Gravitas, 2013
- "State of Grace", a 1996 song by Annie Crummer
