= Athens Ohio Halloween Block Party =

Annual event

Coordinates: 39°19′50″N 82°06′05″W

Athens Halloween Block Party
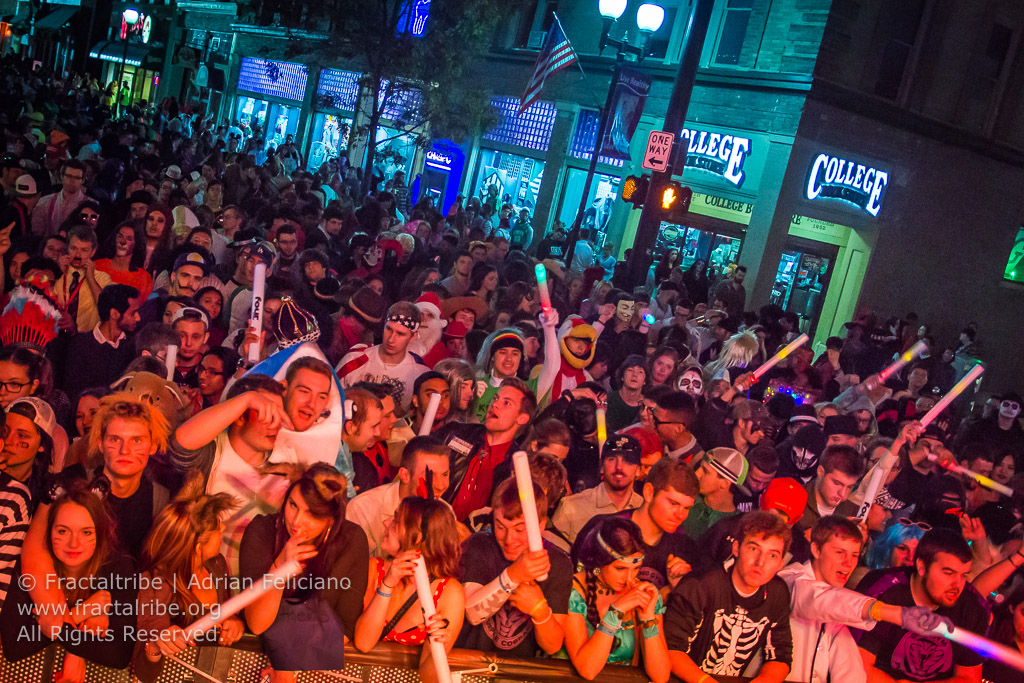
- View of the crowd from the stage facing South Union Street at the height of Echo Mecca's set during 2015's Halloween Block Party | Photo by Adrian Feliciano | Adrianfeliciano.com
- Genre: Block party
- Date: Saturday falling closest to October 31st
- Begins: 1:00P.M. (EST)
- Frequency: Annual
- Location: Athens, Ohio United States
- Inaugurated: October 31, 1974
- Participants: Athens County residents Ohio University students, college students statewide
- Attendance: ~10,000-36,000
- Website: http://www.athenshalloween.com/

Halloween in Athens Ohio is an annual block party in Uptown Athens, Ohio, United States.

Although called a block party, the festivities span several blocks and revelers can be found at house parties around the city. On the closest Saturday to Halloween, an estimated 10,000 to 30,000 party-goers dressed in costumes descend upon the City of Athens. The Ohio University spends roughly $90,000 a year in security and safety measures for the campus. The City of Athens brings in Police forces from surrounding counties to help with crowd control and safety.

== Origins and history ==
The now-traditional annual Halloween Block Party in Athens, Ohio began in 1974 when costumed partiers halted traffic on Court Street in uptown Athens for two hours on Halloween night. The Greenery Bar and Nightclub, owned by Athens resident Athan “Tom” Prakas, was a main force for the party. 1975 was known as the forgotten year as Homecoming and Halloween fell on the same weekend and there was no mention of an uptown block party. 1976 brought the crowds back to Court Street. In 1977 The Athens City Council passed a resolution closing Court Street to traffic and allowing an official Halloween celebration. Ohio University officials planned activities, including a costume contest, live music, and a four by eight foot cake to be served to party goers. 1978 marked the second year the block party was endorsed by the Athens City Council and University officials. Because of the high arrest numbers in 1978, the City of Athens and Ohio University dropped their sponsorship of the festivities in 1979. Despite the lack of official recognition, the block party happened anyway. The annual event continued to grow through the 80's and 90's without University or City support until 1990 when the block party was recognized by the City of Athens again.

The 2010 Halloween Bash saw larger crowds than prior years, but arrests were down from previous years. Temperatures were mild and stages were placed at the intersections of Court St. and State St. and Court St. and Union St. Seventy eight arrests were made by the Athens Police Department between 9:30 P.M. Saturday and 3:30 A.M. Sunday. A fire was reported at the Athena Movie Theatre that caused minor damage.

All indications point towards a continuation of the Halloween Block Party in Athens. Ohio University and the City of Athens continue to refine their plan to deal with the crowds and over the past few years arrests have been down.
