= Religious movement =

Non-specific interpretation of religion

A religious movement is a theological, social, political, or philosophical interpretation of religion that is not generally represented and controlled by a specific church, sect, or denomination. A religious movement is characterized by significant growth in people, ideas and culture. Otherwise, it ceases to be a movement.

== Islamic movements ==
- Salafism
- Ahl-i Hadith
- Deobandism
- Wahhabism

== Christian movements ==
- Charismatic movement
- Christian fundamentalism movement
- Home church movement
- Mission movement
- Revival movement
- Reform movements
  - Ecumenical movement
  - Protestantism
  - Religious orders

== Other religious movements ==
- Fundamentalism – "Global fundamentalism," is an uncomplimentary epithet for religious groups that are viewed as out of sync with the modern world.
- New Age movement
- New religious movement
  - Cult

== Sociological classifications of religious movements ==
- Sociological classifications of religious movements

== Related types of social movements ==
- Art movement
- Civil rights movement
- Ecological movement
- Human rights movement
- Labour movement
- Peace movement
- Political movement
- Social movement
