= Native Records =

British independent record label

- Founded: 1985
- Founder: Kevin Donoghue
- Distributors: the Cartel, Red Rhino Records, Rough Trade, Polydor Records, Pinnacle Records, Code 7, Plastic Head Distribution
- Country of origin: England
- Location: Sheffield, South Yorkshire
- Official website: www.go2native.com

Native Records is a British independent record label formed in Sheffield, England.

The label was founded by Kevin Donoghue in 1985, after he left RCA Records and during his time at the Music Factory where he was a sound engineer and record producer.

In January 1989, Native signed Nine Inch Nails but later released them from their contract when TVT Records offered a better deal.

The label was originally distributed via the Cartel and Red Rhino Records, with Rough Trade distributing in Germany and Radical distributing in Spain. After the collapse of the Cartel in 1989, distribution moved to Polydor Records and subsequently to Pinnacle Records. In 2018, Cherry Red Records acquired the catalogue of Witchwood Media, which included the Native and Inevitable Records catalogues.

Associated labels include: Ozone Recordings.

== Past artists ==
Among Native's releases were two singles by The Darling Buds before the band moved to Epic Records. Native's website later marketed a nine-track compilation titled Shame on You – The Native Recordings, catalogue number ntv 44.

Native's Past Artists Catalogue includes releases by:

The Barristers, The Fireflys, Darling Buds, The Snapdragons, Smashing Orange, Fatal Charm, Deluxe, Steamkings, Greenhouse, Richard H Kirk, Dig Vis Drill, Treebound Story (including Richard Hawley—then a young songwriter), Screaming Trees, The Montgomery Clifts, Berkeley, Torsohorse, Brody, Zoot and the Roots, The Exuberants, UV POP, Midnight Choir, They Must Be Russians, B.Troop, The Emotionals, Leafeater, The Junk, Soberskin, Pemberton Grange, Tadpole, Sound Junkies, Moneypenny, Lucigenic, Morph, Ward C, The North and Popkomm.
