= Fatal Charm =

Fatal Charm may refer to:

- Fatal Charm (band), a band from Nottingham, England
- Fatal Charm, an album by The Mumps, see Lance Loud
- Fearless (1978 film), an Italian poliziottesco film, also known as Fatal Charm
- Fatal Charm (1990 film), a 1990 American thriller film
