= Smashing Orange =

American shoegaze band

- Smashing Orange, 1994

Background information
- Origin: Wilmington, Delaware, United States
- Genres: Alternative rock; shoegazing; grunge
- Years active: 1990–1995
- Labels: Native, Ringers Lactate, Chameleon, MCA, Elelphant Stone
- Past members: Rob Montejo (vocals); Sara Montejo (vocals); Rick Hodgson (guitar); Steve Wagner (bass); Tim Supplee (drums); Stroller White (drums)

Smashing Orange was an American band formed in 1990. They released three albums before splitting up in the mid-1990s. Their early sound saw them classified as shoegazing.

== History ==
The band was formed by siblings Rob and Sara Montejo, with Rick Hodgson, Steve Wagner, and Tim Supplee, all of whom worked together in a local record store, and had left or dropped out of college prior to forming the band. When Lush played at The Marquee Club in London, Smashing Orange provided the support, unfortunately Sara was unable to enter the UK as she was under 16, so the band played their European tour as a four-piece. The band was signed by UK label Native Records, their first release being the single "My Deranged Heart" in April 1991, gaining comparisons with the likes of My Bloody Valentine and Galaxie 500. Their sound has also been described as sounding "like Ride would if they had any balls about them". This was followed a month later by a self-titled mini-album, and in November of that year by second single "Not Very Much To See".

While they were in the UK, Native arranged for them to record a session for the John Peel BBC radio show, which was broadcast in February 1992. Native released the mini album Above Ming Gardens in 1992.

Their first full-length album, The Glass Bead Game, was released in 1992, with third album, 1994's No Return in the End seeing a shift in style towards a harder garage rock sound, and also a move to MCA Records. Sara Montejo had left earlier and Supplee had been replaced on drums by Stroller White, but a disappointing response to the album saw the band split soon after its release.

An anthology of their early work, 1991 was issued by Elephant Stone Records in 2005.

== The Sky Drops ==
Rob Montejo went on to form Love American Style, releasing "Undo" on Oxygen Records. He then formed the short-lived, My Wig is On. They released an internet-only EP in 2002. In 2004, he released a self-titled internet-only full length. He is currently in the gaze-grunge duo The Sky Drops with Monika Bullette (drums/vocals). Their first EP Clouds of People was released in 2006. Their debut full length Bourgeois Beat was released in the Summer of 2009. The EP "Making Mountains" was released in June 2011. They performed at the 2011 Austin Psych Fest 4.

== Discography ==
=== Singles/EPs ===
- "My Deranged Heart" (Native/Ringers Lactate) 1991
- "Not Very Much To See" (Native) 1991
- track" My Deranged Heart" included on album "Guitar and Drums" a native document (native)1991

=== Albums ===
- Smashing Orange (Native) 1991
- Above Ming Gardens (Native) 1992
- The Glass Bead Game (American Native) 1992
- No Return In The End (MCA) 1994
- 1991 (Elephant Stone) 2005
