= Remix service =

Company that provides remixed music to disc jockeys

A remix service is a company that provides remixed music to disc jockeys.

== History ==
In the United States, the disco craze of the late 1970s led to the release of extended "disco" versions of songs, typically released as 12" vinyl singles. Many of these were not easily beatmixed, so DJs started to edit songs by splicing reel-to-reel tape copies, making their own versions better structured for a live DJ set.

Disconet, the first remix service, launched in 1977. Similar companies gathered DJs and producers together to create monthly, promotional-only compilation albums containing re-edits, remixes, or medleys that were intended specifically for club DJs.

By 1994 there was a saturation of remix services, most of which typically remixed the same tracks as their competitors. The RIAA began notifying remix services of their obligations regarding permission from music publishers, or else face litigation. Many of the services that survived this period, such as Ultimix, X-mix, Hot Tracks, and Wicked Mix, featured remixers that had radio mix-shows. In exchange for granting a remix of certain tracks, remixers could help labels promote new songs they were releasing by featuring them heavily in their mix-show.

Although some services ultimately ceased operations, mixes began to appear at most DJ record shops. One of the larger services attempted to establish a system for all services to become legal, by either paying a flat fee or a percentage of sales to a commission who would then allocate the money to the publishers whose tracks were used. This idea was rejected by the labels.

== Modern mixes ==
Over the years the remixes featured on DJ compilations have varied from simple edits (adding a mixable intro and outro to a song) to digital, multi-track remixes that differ substantially from the original track. Many remix services have focused on a specific style of music (such as hip-hop or rock) or type of remix (such as house mixes of pop hits).

Most remix-services companies (including Disconet) have folded for financial or legal reasons; remix services are required to work with the original record label or artist to get permission to edit and release a track, although various bootleg services do not.

== Distribution ==
Most remix-service companies required a DJ subscription agreement to buy the records or CDs, with each issue typically limited in quantity. As a result, many such compilations have become collector's items. While a remix-service version of a song might be released commercially by the artist's record label, the vast majority are limited to DJ subscribers.

== Notable companies ==
The UK-based Disco Mix Club (DMC) remix service has the most members in the world, with offices in nearly every country. they sponsor the yearly World DJ Championships as well as releasing many commercial compilations.

Some remix-service companies helped launch the careers of subsequently successful remixers/producers. Chris Cox (formerly of Thunderpuss) worked for Hot Tracks (now Select Mix). Armand Van Helden created mixes for Mega-Mixx and X-Mix. Markus Schulz, C. L. McSpadden and Aaron Scofield made mixes for Powerhouse; after the company folded Scofield and McSpadden offered remixes through Culture Shock, while Schulz releases remixes and original compositions through his own Coldharbour Recordings label. Ben Liebrand released numerous remixes with DMC. A few companies/artists besides Schulz have also developed their own commercial record labels to release new tracks.

== Megamixes ==
Many remix services issue megamixes, containing multiple songs mixed together, sometimes in rapid succession. They can consist of songs by a single artist or multiple artists, and some may follow a theme as well (eg. Christmas). Megamixes are sometimes called medleys.

Megamixes are also commonly found on commercial releases, sometimes using the same mix previously released to DJs on a remix service. The earlier Jive Bunny and the Mastermixers series of '50s and '60s megamixes were originally released on the Music Factory Mastermix service.

Among modern services, Ultimix is known for producing several megamixes each year based on popular songs of the year ("flashback medleys") as well as single-artist megamixes. Culture Shock has Hit "AC" Megamixes on their main series derived from their defunct radio show, as well as the satellite series Use Alternative Routes which contains modern rock megamixes. The UK-based DMC and Music Factory Mastermix remix services also frequently include megamixes on their issues.
