= Sociological classifications of religious movements =

Classifications of religious movements

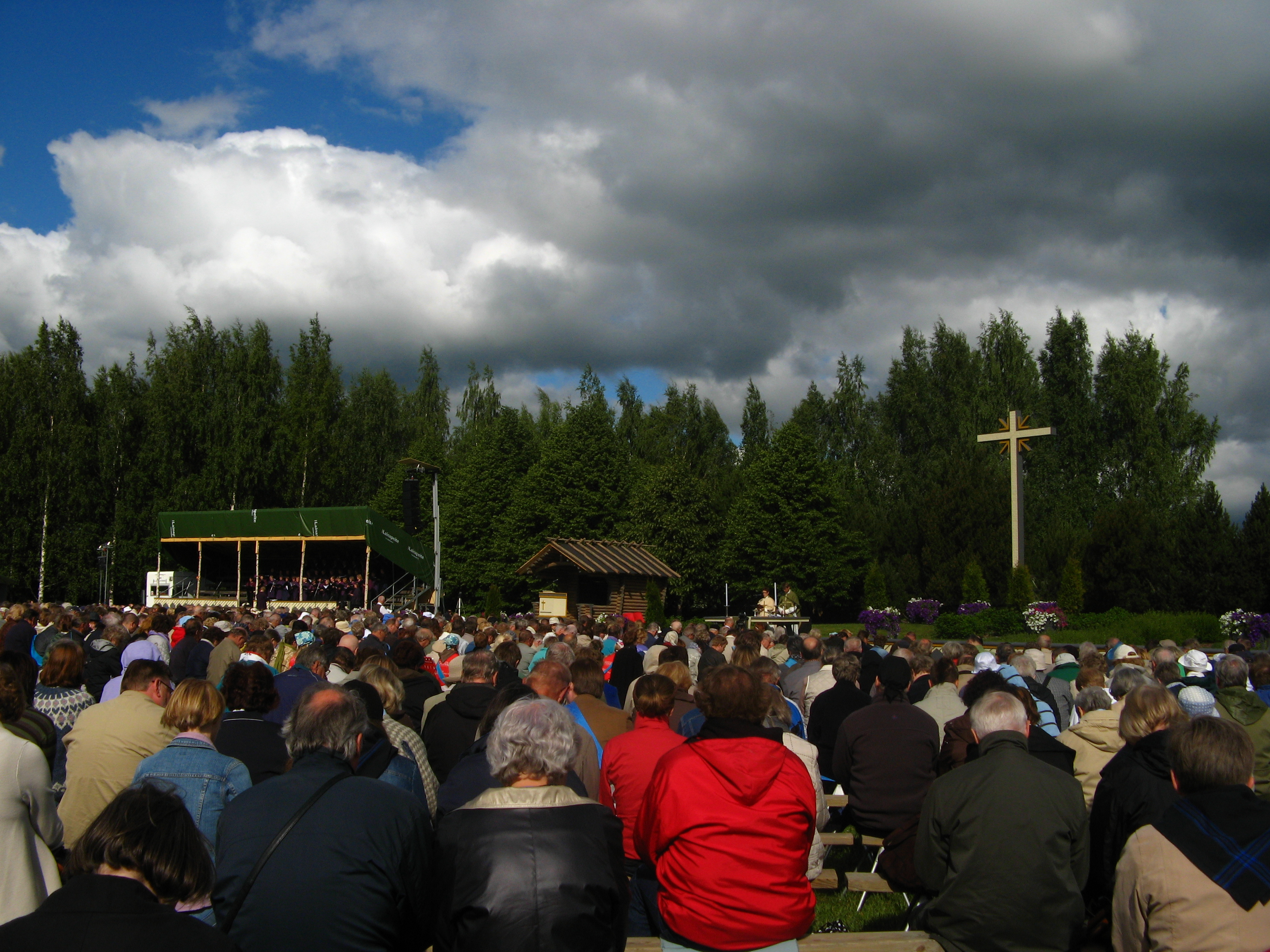
Herättäjäjuhlat, or the Awakening festival, in Seinäjoki, Finland in 2009

Various sociological classifications of religious movements have been proposed by scholars. In the sociology of religion, the most widely used classification is the church-sect typology. The typology is differently construed by different sociologists, and various distinctive features have been proposed to characterise churches and sects. On most accounts, the following features are deemed relevant:

- The church is a compulsory organisation into which people are born, while the sect is a voluntary organisation to which people usually convert.
- The church is an inclusive organisation to which all kinds of people may belong, while the sect is an exclusive organisation of religiously qualified people.
- The church is an established organisation that is well integrated into the larger society and usually inclined to seek for an alliance with the political power, while the sect is a splinter group from a larger religion: it is often in tension with current societal values, rejects any compromise with the secular order and tends to be composed of underprivileged people.
- The church exhibits complex hierarchical bureaucratic structures, while the sect is a smaller, democratic and relatively informal organisation.
- The ministers of a church are formally trained, educated and ordained, while the sect rejects sharp distinctions between clergy and laity, and is often ruled by charismatic leaders.
- In theology and liturgy the church is inclined to dogmatism, traditionalism and ritualism, while the sect promotes intensified spiritual experiences for its members and adopts a more inspirational, informal and unpredictable approach to preaching and worship.

The church-sect typology has been enriched with subtypes. The theory of the church-sect continuum states that churches, ecclesia, denominations and sects form a continuum with decreasing influence on society. Sects are break-away groups from more mainstream religions and tend to be in tension with society. Cults and new religious movements fall outside this continuum and in contrast to aforementioned groups often have a novel teaching. They have been classified on their attitude towards society and the level of involvement of their adherents.

== Church-sect typology ==
A diagram of the church-sect typology continuum including church, denomination, sect, cult, new religious movement, and institutionalized sect

The church-sect typology has its origins in the work of Max Weber and Ernst Troeltsch, and from about the 1930s to the late 1960s it inspired numerous studies and theoretical models especially in American sociology.

Weber characterised the church as a compulsory, bureaucratic, inclusive organisation whose membership is obtained primarily at birth by ascription, and the sect as a voluntary, democratic, exclusive organisation whose members are recruited through individual admission after establishment of qualification. Ernest Troeltsch accepted Weber's definition but added the notion of a varying degree of accommodation with social morality: the church is intrinsically conservative, inclined to seek for an alliance with the upper classes and aiming at dominating all elements within society, while the sect is in tension with current societal values, rejects any compromise with the secular order and tends to be composed of underprivileged people.

Subsequent sociological and theological studies elaborated on Weber's and Troeltsch's typologies incorporating them into a theory of the church-sect "continuum" or "movement". H. Richard Niebuhr viewed religious groups as ranging between the poles of the sect and the church: sects are protest groups that break away from the church in search of more authentic religious experiences. Sects are inherently unstable and as they grow they tend to become church-like; once they have become established institutions, marked by compromise and accommodation, they are in turn exposed to new schismatic challenges. The sect is a result of "the religious revolts of the poor," and the driving force of the cyclical movement between sect and church is not so much doctrinal controversy as social stratification and conflict taking place along class, race, ethnicity and sectional lines.

Other scholars enriched the typology with subtypes. Howard Becker introduced a continuum of types ranging from the cult to the sect, the denomination and the ecclesia, and John Milton Yinger delineated a sixfold typology: the universal church (e.g., the Roman Catholic Church), the ecclesia, by which he meant established national churches (e.g., the Church of England, the Russian Orthodox Church), the denomination (e.g., Baptists, Presbyterians), the established sect (e.g., Seventh-Day Adventists, Quakers), the sect (e.g., many Pentecostals, the Worldwide Church of God) and the cult (e.g., The Family, Scientology). Benton Johnson simplified the definition of sect and church and based it on a single variable: the degree of acceptance of the social environment. A church is a religious group that accepts the social environment in which it exists, a sect is a religious group that rejects it.

The church-sect typology and the notion of a church-sect continuum or movement from the sect to the church came under strong attack in the sociology of religion of the 1960s onwards. The theory suffered from lack of agreement on the distinguishing features, from proliferation of new types and from questionable empirical evidence on its core assumptions. Many contributions to the debate were perceived as being pure classificatory in nature and devoid of significant theoretical content. Eventually there was general agreement among scholars to abandon use of the typology altogether, although the waning of the debate on the church-sect typology did not affect the persisting interest for Weber's contributions on the topic and more broadly for his sociology of religion. Moreover, notwithstanding the criticisms, the distinction between sect and church has become part of the standard theoretical repertoire of sociologists.

=== Max Weber ===
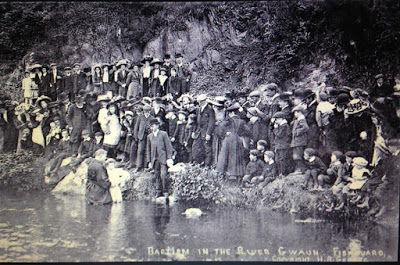
A scene from the 1904–1905 Welsh revival. Dan Davies of Hermon Chapel conducting a baptism in the River Gwaun in 1905.

As Weber's ideas on church and sect have developed in the course of time, what follows is a sketch of key definitions and themes.

Both the church and the sect are hierocratic organisations as they enforce their orders through psychic coercion by providing or denying religious goods such as spiritual benefits (magical blessing, sacraments, grace, forgiveness, etc.) and material benefits (ecclesiastical benefices and other endowments). Unlike the sect, however, the church is a compulsory organisation whose membership is typically determined by birth or by infant baptism rather than by voluntary association, and which claims "a monopoly on the legitimate use of hierocratic coercion". Because of its claim to universal hierocratic domination, the church is inclined to level all non-religious distinctions and to overcome "household, sib and tribal ties ... ethnic and national barriers". No one is in principle excluded from the church, not even the unrepentant sinners, the sceptics and the indifferents. The church "lets grace shine over the righteous and unrighteous alike ... Affiliation with the church is, in principle, obligatory, and hence proves nothing with regard to the member's qualities."

The church is also characterised by "a professional priesthood removed from the 'world', with salaries, promotions, professional duties, and a distinctive way of life". Ministers are usually appointed on the basis of their formally certified religious education and operate in a hierarchical administrative structure. The demands of the church towards the clergy can be more or less demanding, but their full satisfaction – the holiness of the minister – is not a condition for the efficacy of the sacraments or for the performance of the religious rituals: the church fulfils its mission ex opere operato, and sharply distinguishes between persona and office, that is, between charisma of the individual minister (which may occasionally be lacking) and efficacy of the religious function, which is perpetual and depends on the will of God alone.

While the church is "a compulsory association for the administration of grace", the sect (for Weber) is "a voluntary association" of religiously qualified persons. It is voluntary because it is based on willingness to adopt the standards of ethical conduct required for sect membership: membership is not ascribed at birth but results from the free acceptance of the sect's doctrine and discipline by the follower, and from the continuous acceptance of the follower by the sect. The sect does not express a claim of universal hierocratic domination, and therefore it is exclusive – an "aristocracy of the elect" – instead of inclusive like the church. It consists of individuals whose conduct and life style "proclaim the glory of God", religiously qualified persons who believe (or hope) to be "called to salvation". As a free association of "religious virtuosos", the sect raises high demands towards its members and enforces the strictest discipline upon them.

A "sect" in the sociological sense of the word is an exclusive association of religious virtuosos or of especially qualified religious persons, recruited through individual admission after establishment of qualification. By contrast a "church," as a universalistic establishment of the salvation of the masses raises the claim like the "state," that everyone, at least each child of a member, must belong by birth.

In contrast to the professional priesthood of the church, members of the sect can exercise hierocratic power only by virtue of personal charisma. Lay preaching and universal priesthood are the norm, as well as "direct democratic administration" by the congregation, which is jointly responsible for the celebration of the sacraments by a worthy minister in a state of grace. The ministerial position is not an "office" backed by ecclesiastical structures of authority but an appointment or "election" subject to the popular will of the congregation; the minister is a servant of the congregation, and no bureaucratic separation between persona and office, between individual and function, is ever admissible.

The Catholic, Anglican and Orthodox churches are paradigmatic cases of church-like organisations; outside Christianity, good examples of so-defined churches can be found, according to Weber, in Islam, in the Lamaist form of Buddhism and, in a more limited sense, in Mahdism, Judaism and probably in the late Ancient Egyptian hierocracy. The official management of Confucianism stood against Buddhist, Taoist, and sectarian pursuits of salvation of all sorts. Calvinism is best characterized as a sect-like church; Baptists, Quakers and Methodists are paradigmatic cases of sects, as are Christian Scientists and Adventists. In between these two poles, varying degrees of approximation to the church or to the sect are possible, according to Weber. Hinduism, for example, is a strictly birth-religion, to which one belongs merely by being born to Hindu parents, but is exclusive as a sect because for certain religious offences one can be forever excluded from the community.

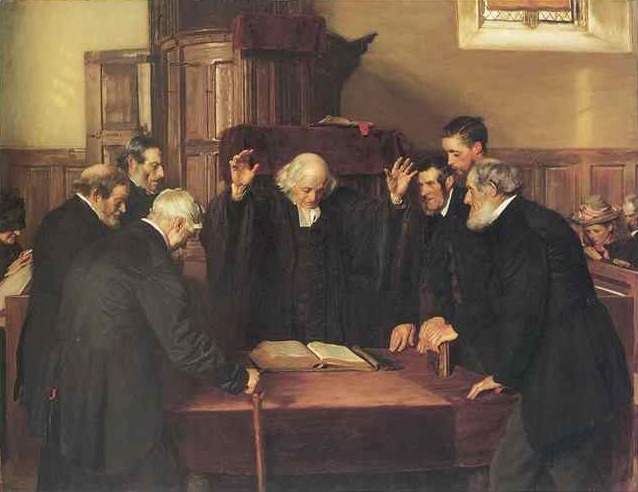
The Ordination of Elders in a Scottish Kirk, by John Henry Lorimer, 1891. National Gallery of Scotland.

In fact, the distinction between church and sect is not dichotomic, but continuous. The labels "church" and "sect" do not correspond exactly to any empirical phenomenon but rather stress elements common in varying degrees to most phenomena. They are ideal types, that is, heuristic devices for highlighting relevant aspects of the social world, highly simplified representations of reality, "special and 'one-sided' viewpoints" according to which the researcher selects what is relevant for the purposes of historical and sociological explanation. As ideal types, church and sect do not describe reality and hardly can be found in pure form, but help us understand why people act the way they do by developing meaningful social theories.

One theory developed by Weber suggests that the development of capitalism and democracy in the United States have been positively affected by the sectarian form of certain religious groups such as the puritans and the Baptists. According to Weber, American democracy "did not constitute a formless sand heap of individuals, but rather a buzzing complex of strictly exclusive, yet voluntary associations;" American democracy is not made of isolated individuals but rather of associations which, like the sects, function as control mechanisms that foster high moral standards and encourage individual responsibility:

- First, Weber believes that sects generally promote individualism and freedom of conscience. While the church's claim to universal hierocratic domination is inherently hostile to freedom of conscience and individual rights, the sect "gives rise to an inalienable personal right of the governed as against any power, whether political, hierocratic or patriarchal".
- Secondly, according to Weber there is "an elective affinity between the sect and political democracy", which stems from the structural features of the sect – the treatment of clerical officials as servants of the congregation and the practice of direct democracy in its administration.
- Finally, as voluntary associations of qualified people, sects maintain discipline: they select, probe and sanction their members, and are likely to have the greatest educative influence on individuals and through them on the wider society.

Weber argues that sect membership worked in the United States as "a certificate of moral qualification and especially business morals": sects provided proof of one's reputation, honesty and trustworthiness, and in doing so they became a vital source of "the bourgeois capitalist business ethos among the broad strata of the middle classes (the farmers included).".

=== Ernst Troeltsch ===
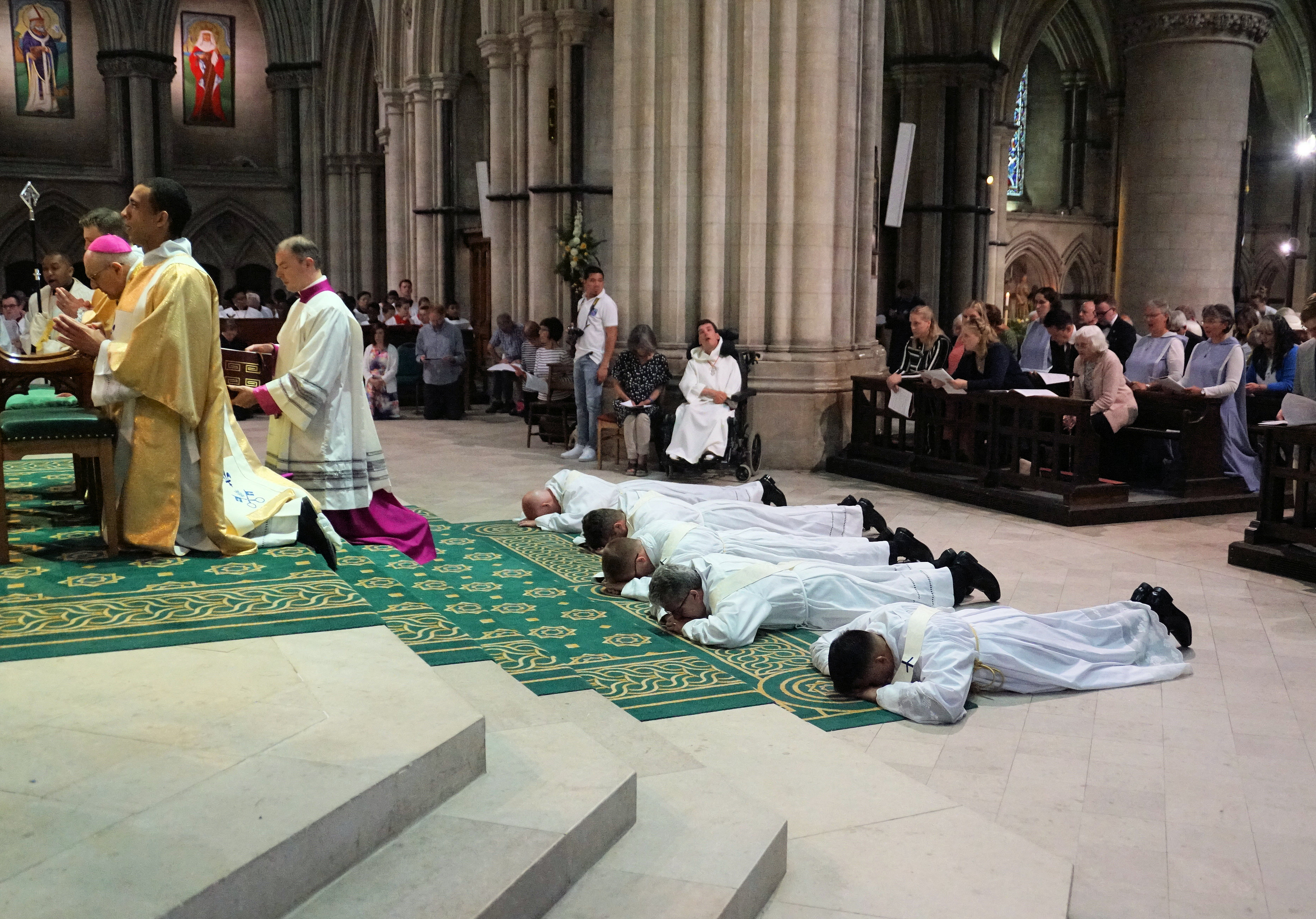
Ordination to Priesthood, St John the Baptist Cathedral, Norwich, Roman Catholic Diocese of East Anglia, 2019

Troeltsch largely relies upon Weber's distinction between church and sect. Like Weber, Troeltsch stresses the "objective institutional character" of the church compared to the "voluntary community" of the sect, and distinguishes the "universal all-embracing ideal" of the church, its desire to control great masses of people, from the gathering of "a select group of the elect" by the sect, which is placed "in sharp opposition to the world." To these Weberian ideas Troeltsch adds a new distinguishing feature, which is the different attitude towards compromise and accommodation with societal demands. The church adapts to the secular world and exhibits a high degree of compromise with the larger society and with the civil authorities, which it supports in order to maintain itself and gain influence; in contrast to this, the sect is born out of protest, rejects any compromise and tends to be smaller and composed of underprivileged people. Sectarian commitments are motivated by the social protests of the lower classes.

Troeltsch arrives at his definitions of church and sect on the basis of an examination of the history of Christian Europe prior to about 1800, and conceives of church and sect as independent sociological expressions of two different interpretations of Christianity. The sect emphasizes the eschatological features of Christian doctrine, which it interprets literally and in a radical manner; it is a small, voluntary fellowship of converts who seek to realize the divine law in their own behaviour, setting themselves apart from and in opposition to the world, and refusing to draw a sharp distinction between clergy and laity; it embraces ideals of frugality, prohibits participation in legal and political affairs, and appeals principally to the lower classes. In theology and liturgy, the sect refrains from bureaucratic dogmatism and ritualism and, compared to the church, it adopts a more inspirational, informal and unpredictable approach to preaching and worship.

=== Church and ecclesia ===
Johnstone provides the following seven characteristics of churches:

- Claim universality, include all members of the society within their ranks, and have a strong tendency to equate "citizenship" with "membership"
- Exercise religious monopoly and try to eliminate religious competition
- Are very closely allied with the state and secular powers; frequently there is overlapping of responsibilities and much mutual reinforcement
- Are extensively organized as a hierarchical bureaucratic institution with a complex division of labor
- Employ professional, full-time clergy who possess the appropriate credentials of education and formal ordination
- Primarily gain new members through natural reproduction and the socialization of children into the ranks
- Allow for diversity by creating different groups within the church (e.g., orders of nuns or monks) rather than through the formation of new religions

The classical example of a church by this definition is the Catholic Church, especially in the past, such as the State church of the Roman Empire.

Islam is a church in countries like Saudi Arabia and Iran, where there is no separation of church and state. The Basic Law of Saudi Arabia states: "[The Constitution of Saudi Arabia is] God's Book [the Qur'an] and the Sunnah of His Prophet [Muhammad]". These nations are ruled under an official interpretation of religious law (Salafi in the case of Saudi Arabia), and the religious law predominates the legal system. Saudi Arabia, however, lacks Johnstone's criteria for an ordained clergy and a strictly hierarchical structure; however, it has the ulema and their Senior Council with the exclusive power of issuing fatwa, as well as fiqh jurisprudence through the Permanent Committee for Scholarly Research and Ifta. In the Shi'a denominations, there is a professional clergy led by a Grand Ayatollah.

A slight modification of the church type is that of ecclesia. Ecclesias include the above characteristics of churches with the exception that they are generally less successful at garnering absolute adherence among all of the members of the society and are not the sole religious body. The state churches of some European nations would fit this type.

=== Denominations ===
The denomination lies between the church and the sect on the continuum. Denominations come into existence when churches lose their religious monopoly in a society. A denomination is one religion among many. When churches or sects become denominations, there are also some changes in their characteristics. Johnstone provides the following eight characteristics of denominations:

1. similar to churches, but unlike sects, in being on relatively good terms with the state and secular powers and may even attempt to influence government at times
2. maintain at least tolerant and usually fairly friendly relationships with other denominations in a context of religious pluralism
3. rely primarily on birth for membership increase, though it will also accept converts; some actively pursue evangelization
4. accept the principle of at least modestly changing doctrine and practice and tolerate some theological diversity and dispute
5. follow a fairly routinized ritual and worship service that explicitly discourages spontaneous emotional expression
6. train and employ professional clergy who must meet formal requirements for certification
7. accept less extensive involvement from members than do sects, but more involvement than churches
8. often draw disproportionately from the middle and upper classes of society

Most of the major Christian bodies formed post-reformation are denominations by this definition (e.g., Baptists, Methodists, Lutherans, Seventh-day Adventists).

=== Sects ===
Sociologically, a "sect" is defined as a newly formed religious group that formed to protest elements of its parent religion (generally a denomination). Their motivation tends to be situated in accusations of apostasy or heresy in the parent denomination; they often decry liberal trends in denominational development and advocate a return to so-called "true" religion.

Leaders of sectarian movements (i.e., the formation of a new sect) tend to come from a lower socio-economic class than the members of the parent denomination, a component of sect development that is not yet entirely understood. Most scholars believe that when sect formation involves social class distinctions, they reflect an attempt to compensate for deficiencies in lower social status. An often-seen result of such factors is the incorporation into the theology of the new sect a distaste for the adornments of the wealthy (e.g., jewelry or other signs of wealth).

After their formation, sects take one of three paths: dissolution, institutionalization, or eventual development into a denomination. If the sect withers in membership, it will dissolve. If the membership increases, the sect is forced to adopt the characteristics of denominations in order to maintain order (e.g., bureaucracy, explicit doctrine, etc.). And even if the membership does not grow or grows slowly, norms will develop to govern group activities and behavior. The development of norms results in a decrease in spontaneity, which is often a primary attraction of sects. The adoption of denomination-like characteristics can either turn the sect into a full-blown denomination or, if a conscious effort is made to maintain some of the spontaneity and protest components of sects, an institutionalized sect can result. Institutionalized sects are midway between sects and denominations on the continuum of religious development. They have a mixture of sect-like and denomination-like characteristics; examples include Hutterites, Iglesia ni Cristo, and the Amish.

Most of the well-known denominations of the U.S. existing today originated as sects breaking away from denominations (or Churches, in the case of Lutheranism and Anglicanism), including Methodists, Baptists, and Seventh-day Adventists.

Mennonites are an example of an institutionalized sect that did not become a denomination.

== Cult typology ==
The concept of "cult" has lagged behind in refining the terms used in analyzing the other forms of religious origination. Bruce Campbell discusses Troeltsch's concept in defining cults as non-traditional religious groups that are based on belief in a divine element within the individual. He gives three types of cults:

1. a mystically-oriented illumination type
2. an instrumental type, in which inner experience is sought solely for its effects
3. a service-oriented type that focuses on aiding others

Campbell discusses six groups in his analysis: Theosophy, Wisdom of the Soul, spiritualism, New Thought, Scientology, and Transcendental Meditation.

In the late nineteenth century, a number of works appeared that helped clarify what was involved in cults. Several scholars of this subject, such as Joseph Campbell (1904–1987) and Bruce Campbell, noted that cults are associated with beliefs in a divine element in the individual—either one's soul, self, or true self. Cults are inherently ephemeral and loosely organized. There is a major theme in many of the recent works that show the relationship between cults and mysticism. Campbell highlights two major types of cults: one mystical and the other instrumental. This analysis can divide the cults into either occult or metaphysical assemblies.

Campbell proposes that cults are non-traditional religious groups based on belief in a divine element in the individual. Other than the two main types, there is also a third type – the service-oriented cult. Campbell states that "the kinds of stable forms which evolve in the development of religious organization will bear a significant relationship to the content of the religious experience of the founder or founders."

=== Classification by origin and development ===
In standard sociological typology, cults are, like sects, new religious groups. But, unlike sects, they can form without breaking off from another religious group, though this is not always the case. The characteristic that most distinguishes cults from sects is that they do not advocate a return to pure religion but rather promote embracing something new or something that has been completely lost or forgotten (e.g., lost scriptures or new prophecy). Cults are also much more likely to be led by charismatic leaders than are other religious groups, and charismatic leaders tend to be the individuals who bring forth the new or lost component that is the focal element of the cult.

Cults, like sects, often integrate elements of existing religious theologies, but cults tend to create more esoteric theologies synthesized from many sources. According to Ronald L. Johnstone, cults tend to emphasize individual and individual peace.

Cults, like sects, can develop into denominations. As cults grow, they bureaucratize and create many of the characteristics of denominations. Some scholars are hesitant to grant cults denominational status because many cults maintain their more esoteric characteristics. However, their closer semblance to denominations than to the cult type allows them to be classified as denominations. Sample denominations in the U.S. that began as cults include Christian Science and the Nation of Islam.

=== Cults or new religious movements ===
From the second half of the 20th century, some scholars in the social scientific study of religion have advocated referring to cults as new religious movements (NRMs) hoping to avoid the often pejorative and derogatory connotations attached to the word "cult" in popular language.

=== Criticism ===
Religious scholar John A. Saliba notes the many attempts to draw a classification or typology of cults and sects but concludes that the divergences that exist in these groups' practices, doctrines, and goals do not lend themselves to a simple classification that has universal approval. He argues that the influx of Eastern religious systems, including Taoism, Confucianism, and Shintoism, which do not fit within the traditional distinctions between church, sect, denomination, and cult, have compounded typological difficulties. Koehrsen shows that the difficulties of classifying religious groups according to the typology even apply to Christian congregations. Single congregations continuously move on the church-sect spectrum. They switch between "churches" and "sects", strategically adapting their religious practices to the given context.

=== Meta-criticism ===
Lorne L. Dawson examines the history and future of the church-sect typology in a 2008 article, opining that the typology survives as a useful tool.

== Wallis' distinction between cults and sects ==
The sociologist Roy Wallis (1945–1990) introduced differing definitions of sects and cults. He argued that a cult is characterized by "epistemological individualism" by which he means that "the cult has no clear locus of final authority beyond the individual member." According to Wallis, cults are generally described as "oriented towards the problems of individuals, loosely structured, tolerant, non-exclusive", making "few demands on members", without possessing a "clear distinction between members and non-members", having "a rapid turnover of membership", and are transient collectives with vague boundaries and fluctuating belief systems. Wallis asserts that cults emerge from the "cultic milieu." Wallis contrasts a cult with a sect in that he asserts that sects are characterized by "epistemological authoritarianism": sects possess some authoritative locus for the legitimate attribution of heresy. According to Wallis, "sects lay a claim to possess unique and privileged access to the truth or salvation, such as collective salvation, and their committed adherents typically regard all those outside the confines of the collectivity as 'in error'."

== Cult and/or new religious movements ==
=== Stark and Bainbridge ===
In 1975, the sociologists Rodney Stark and William Sims Bainbridge distinguish three types of cults, classified on the basis of the levels of organizational and client (or adherent) involvement:

- Audience cults which have hardly any organization because participants/consumers lack significant involvement.
- Client cults, in which the service-providers exhibit a degree of organization in contrast to their clients. Client cults link into moderate-commitment social networks through which people exchange goods and services. The relationship between clients and the leaders of client cults resembles that of patients and therapists.
- Cult movements, which seek to provide services that meet all of their adherents' spiritual needs, although they differ significantly in the degree to which they use mobilize adherents' time and commitment.

The sociologist Paul Schnabel has argued that the Church of Scientology originated from an audience cult (the readership of Hubbard's book Dianetics: The Modern Science of Mental Health and the Astounding Science Fiction article which had preceded it) into a client cult (Dianetics) then into a cult movement (the Church of Scientology).

=== Roy Wallis ===
The sociologist Roy Wallis introduced a classification system of new religious movements based on movements' views on and relationships with the world at large.

- World-rejecting movements view the prevailing social order as deviant and a perversion of the divine plan. Such movements see the world as evil or at least as materialistic. They may adhere to millenarian beliefs. The International Society of Krishna Consciousness (a.k.a. "Hare Krishnas"), the Unification Church, the Brahma Kumaris and the Children of God exemplify world-rejecting movements.
- World-accommodating movements draw clear distinctions between the spiritual and the worldly spheres. They have few or no consequences for the lives of adherents. These movements adapt to the world but they do not reject or affirm it.
- World-affirming movements might not have any rituals or any formal ideology. They may lack most of the characteristics of religious movements. They affirm the world and merely claim to have the means to enable people to unlock their "hidden potential". As examples of world-affirming movements, Wallis mentions Werner Erhard's est and Transcendental Meditation.

== See also ==
- Anthropology of religion
- Cult
- List of Christian movements
- New religious movement
- Psychology of religion
- Religious denomination
- Sect
- Sectarianism
- Sociology of religion
