= Athena Cinema =

Movie theater in Athens, Ohio

Coordinates: 39°19′42″N 82°06′04″W

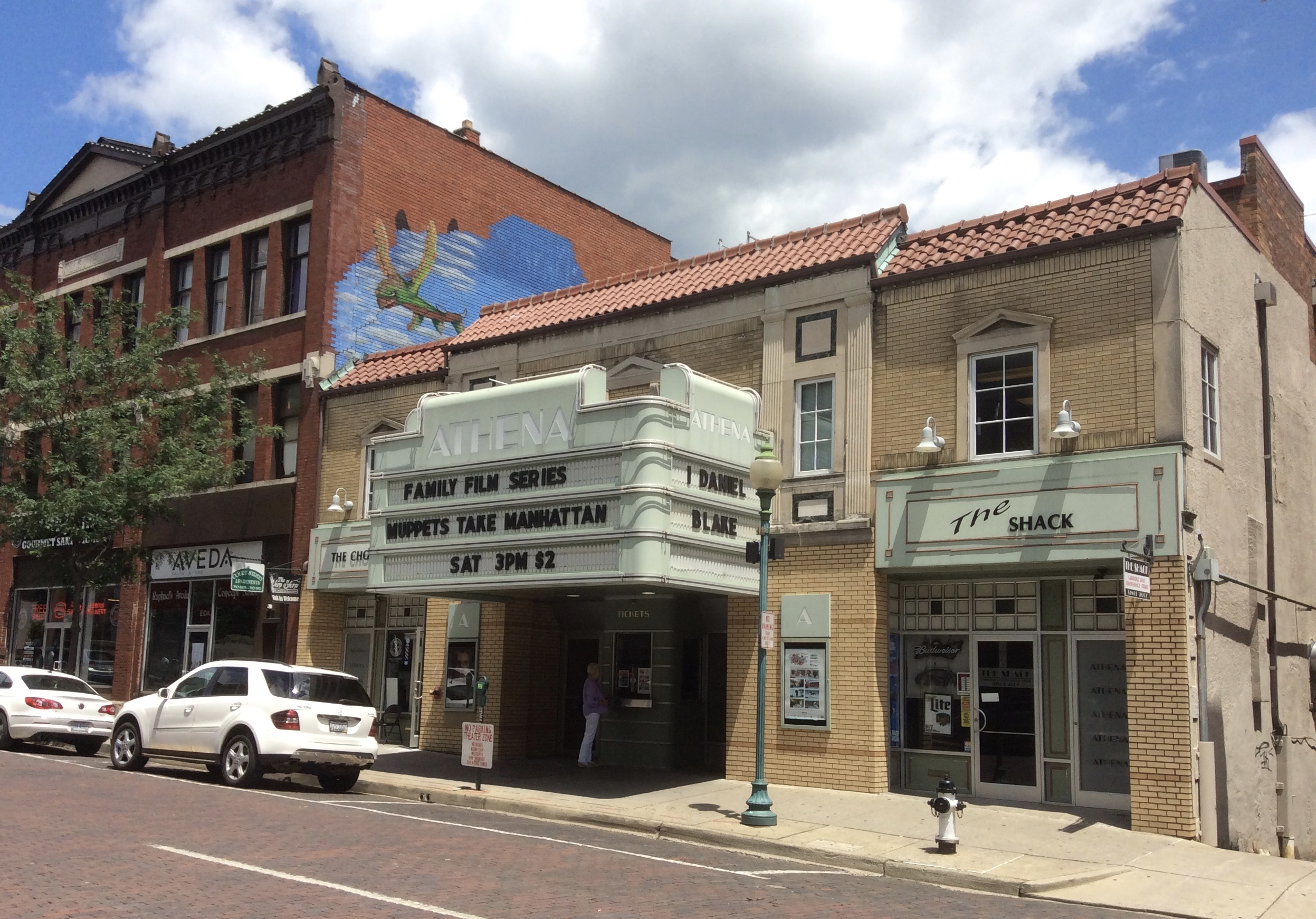
Athena Cinema

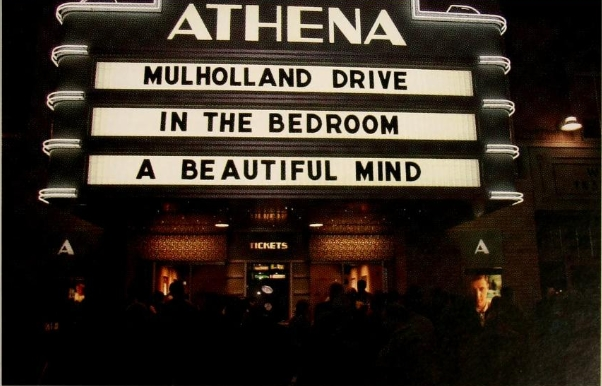
The Athena Cinema in 2001

The Athena Cinema is a movie theater in Athens, Ohio that has been continuously operating since 1915. Originally called The Majestic, the name was eventually changed to Schine's Athena before its current incarnation, the Athena Cinema. Today, it is owned by Ohio University.

== Current ownership and operation ==
In 2001, Bill Duerson, owner of the Athena, put it up for sale, due to struggles with profits. It was later contracted to Ohio University which sought to restore the building, reopening in February 2002. The University contracted the theater to an independent manager. When the lease was nearing expiration, a committee formed to decide how the theater could have a place within the university's mission, employing clusters of business students who added ideas of how the Athena should operate.

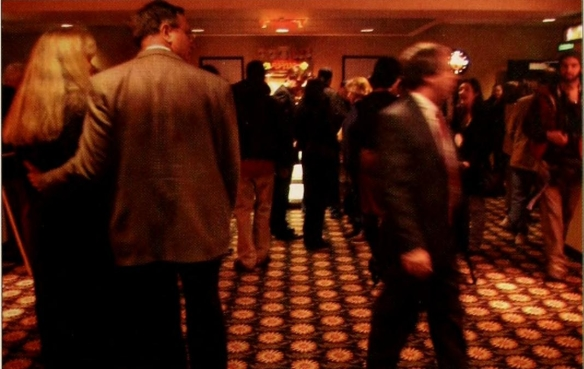
Patrons taking in the Athena upon its 2002 reopening

The students and the committee decided that the Athena should continue as a movie theater and that the College of Fine Arts should run it. "Other recommendations included improving marketing, exploring linkages to the academic enterprise, connecting with more students, co-promoting with uptown businesses, looking at new programming that has community appeal and giving the theater a different niche than other local movie houses."

On September 19, 2008 the Athena reopened under the management of the College of Fine Arts and began screening art house as well as international films.

The current director is Alexandra Kamody, an Ohio University alum and former student worker. The Athena is staffed with over 40 students, paid through Federal Work Study.

Since 1973, the theater has also been the host for the annual Athens International Film + Video Festival (AIFVF).

== History ==
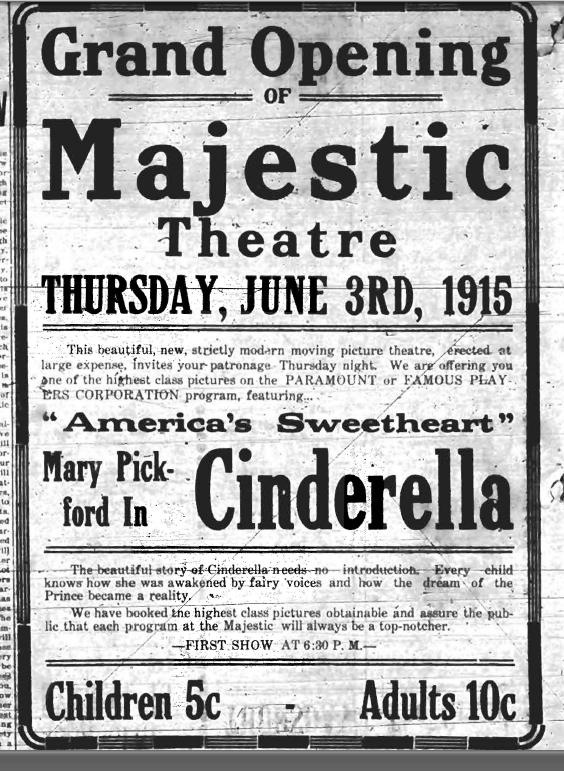

The Majestic, now known as the Athena, opened up in 1915 when the Bethel grocery store was evicted. The first film shown at the theater was Cinderella, starring Mary Pickford. The theater was such a low price, at 5 cents for a “four reeler movie”, that people would rather go to the theater than spend more money seeing something at an expensive opera house. The theater was getting in all the most popular movies from Etta of the Footlights to A Good Little Devil. The theater wanted to keep its prices low and show first run movies for their low price of 5 cents to please their Athens customers. The theater wasn't without its problems though.

People of Ohio weren't ready for some of the more risqué movies. In Ohio, The Birth of a Nation was not allowed to be shown. It took the Ohio Board of Censors two years to allow it, and even then, patrons had to travel to either Columbus or Cincinnati to view it. Another movie that was fairly risqué and caused problems at the Athena was Theda Bara's Sin. The only way the movie was able to be shown, and get past the Censor board, was to play off the movie that it was a depiction of what would happen if one committed a sin and also a study of human behavior.

== Student involvement ==
The Athena has always been a big part of Ohio University's history. The earliest noted school and student involvement was the conga line that formed in 1941 after winning the basketball game. The students, in pure ecstasy, formed a conga line and went into the Athena; danced down the aisle, crossed in front of the screen, then back out onto Court Street and continued down the street.

Students have also always had a little hand in the pricing of tickets. In 1968, two students picketed the theater on a Friday night because of the increased ticket prices. The theater's ticket used to be $1.50, but then the theater announced that they were raising the price of an adult ticket to $2.00. Those students were outraged and decided that picketing was the best solution to lower the prices.

Three days later the theater decided to speak with the original picketers. Since the number of picketers had increased from two to twenty by the end of the weekend, they decided to sit down and come to an agreement on what both parties felt was best for everyone. They decided to do a trial run and see what happened.

They decided that they would now offer a matinee price of $1 if patrons came before 5pm and then at night, they would offer $2 movie tickets. If patrons took advantage of this trial run pricing scheme, then the managers offer this deal all the time. This pleased both parties and everyone went away happy. The student delegates encouraged people to take advantage of this deal, since it was only a trial run, to show the managers that they want this deal to stay.

== Scandal ==
The Athena has had its fair share of scandal.

The Athena, in 1972, switched showing Sexual Freedom in Denmark for No Deposit, No Return because of certain complaints. The mayor, Donald Barrett, sent the Captain of the Police department, Charles Cochran to check out the film to see what everyone in town was complaining about. The mayor claimed that it was the Captain's duty to check out the film and see if the complaints from citizens were warranted.

The theater showed a very risqué movie in 1977 called Fantasy Girls. Two cops went to see the movie and spoke with the manager. It was just a friendly chat but they did express their concern for such raunchy movies being shown at the theater. The Chief of Police, Ted Jones, told the theater to stop showing X-Rated movies. Although he would not say what would happen to the theater if they refused to stop showing X-Rated movies. The manager stopped showing the film but refused to stop showing widely accepted raunchy films such as A Clockwork Orange.

A few days later, the Chief Jones said that he is "not comfortable with police officers making decisions" regarding what is obscene and what is not. The manager of the theater, Ben Geary, completely disagreed with Jones' decision. Geary believed that he has done nothing wrong and that the X-rated movies are monitored. He said that he still disagrees with Jones's opinion.
