= Athens, Ohio =

City in Ohio, US

- City
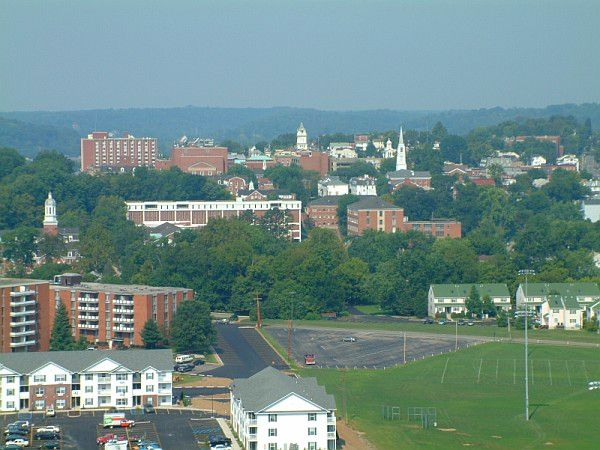
- Athens in 2003

- Flag Logo
- Interactive map of Athens, Ohio
- Location within Ohio Location within the United States
- Coordinates: 39°19′45″N 82°5′46″W
- Country: United States
- State: Ohio
- County: Athens
- Townships: Athens, Canaan
- Incorporated: 1811 (village); 1912 (city)
- Named for: Athens, Greece

Government
  - Mayor: Steve Patterson (D)
  - Legislator: Athens City Council

Area
  - Total: 10.21 sq mi (26.44 km^{2})
  - Land: 9.96 sq mi (25.79 km^{2})
  - Water: 0.25 sq mi (0.65 km^{2})
- Elevation: 709 ft (216 m)

Population (2020)
  - Total: 23,849
  - Estimate (2023): 24,673
  - Density: 2,394.7/sq mi (924.58/km^{2})
- Time zone: UTC-5 (EST)
  - Summer (DST): UTC-4 (EDT)
- ZIP code: 45701
- Area codes: 740, 220
- FIPS code: 39-02736
- GNIS feature ID: 2394009
- Website: ci.athens.oh.us

Athens is a city in Athens County, Ohio, United States, and its county seat. The population was 23,849 at the 2020 United States census. Located along the Hocking River within Appalachian Ohio about 65 miles (105 km) southeast of Columbus, Athens is best known as the home of Ohio University, a large public research university with an undergraduate and graduate enrollment of more than 21,000 students. It is the principal city of the Athens micropolitan area.

== History ==
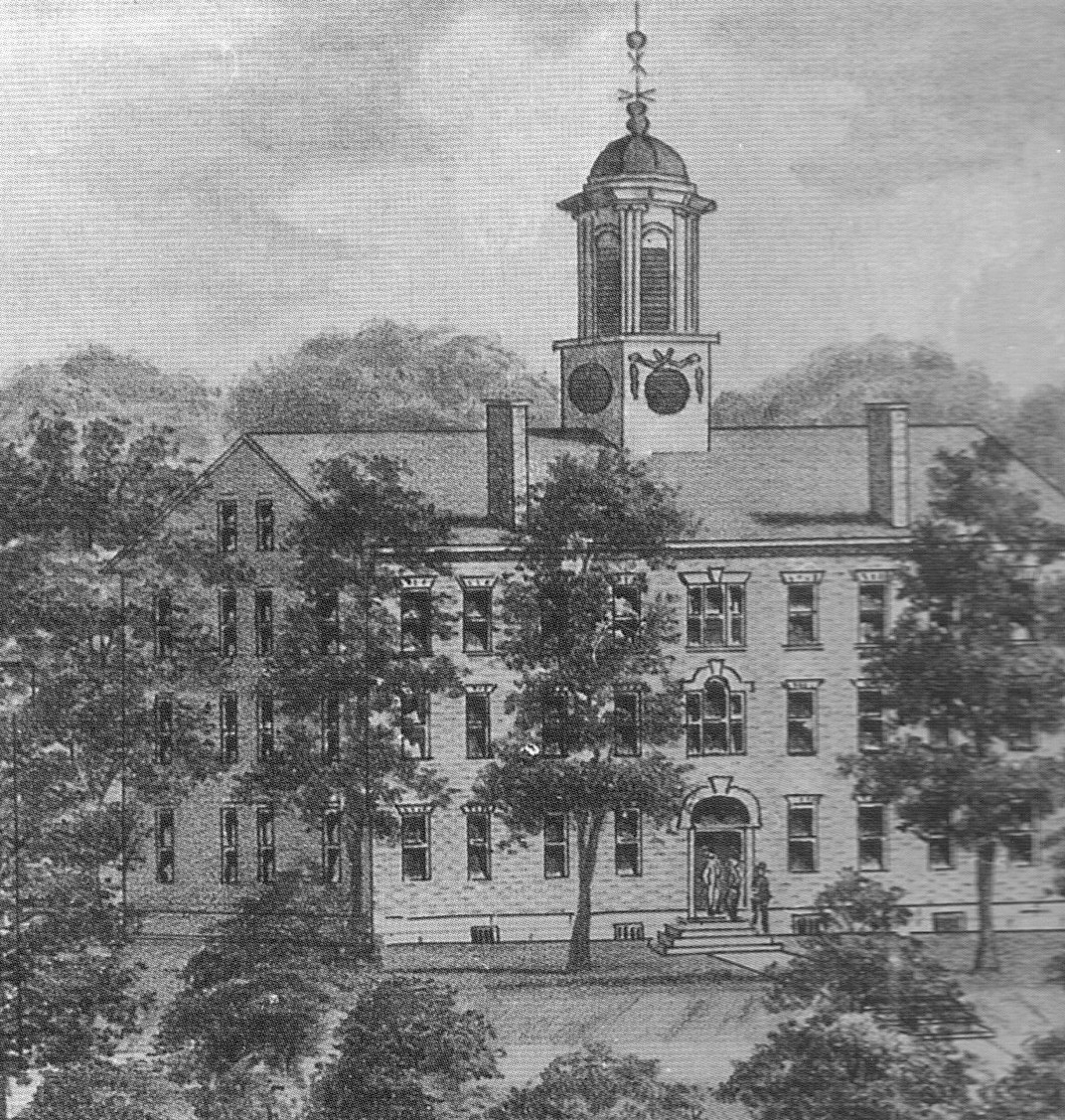
The College Edifice was the first building of higher education in the Northwest Territory

The first permanent European settlers arrived in Athens in 1797, more than a decade after the United States victory in the American Revolutionary War. In 1800, the town site was first surveyed and plotted and incorporated as a village in 1811. Ohio had become a state in 1803. Ohio University was chartered in 1804, the first public institution of higher learning in the Northwest Territory. Previously part of Washington County, Ohio, Athens County was formed in 1805, named for the ancient center of learning, Athens, Greece.

Ohio University in Athens was established with the first federal endowment of an educational institution in the United States. In July 1787, the Congress of the Confederation gave to the Ohio Company of Associates "two townships of good land for the support of a literary institution" in the newly created Northwest Territory.

During The First Session of the Second Territorial General Assembly, held in Chillicothe from November 23, 1801, to January 23, 1802, the General Assembly passed an act establishing the "American Western University" at Athens. The act was approved by Arthur St. Clair, Governor of the Northwest Territory on January 9, 1802. However, no university with the name of American Western University would be established. Ohio became a state in 1803 and on February 18, 1804, the state legislature passed an act establishing the "Ohio University" in the town of Athens. Athens received city status in 1912, following the 1910 census showing the population had passed 5,000 residents, the requirement for city status in Ohio.

Originally, large tracts of land in Athens and Alexander Townships were set aside through a contract between the Congress (under the Articles of Confederation) and the Ohio Company of Associates, a group of American Revolutionary War veterans. These lands were given to Ohio University by the Federal government. This was the first federal land grant for a university, pre-dating the Morrill Act by more than 70 years. At first, lands were mostly leased out, but the failure of many lessors to pay their rents resulted in most of the land being sold. The sale of these lands funded the growth of Ohio University. Today it is one of the largest institutions of higher learning in Ohio, with an enrollment of over 20,000 on the Athens campus and over 28,000 for all campuses.

The earliest industry in the area was salt production, followed by iron production and coal extraction. The largest employer in the county is Ohio University. In 1843, the Hocking Canal opened, enabling shipping from the Ohio River up the Hocking River, which passes through Athens, to Nelsonville, Ohio, and points beyond. However, the canal was closed during cold winters when it froze over.

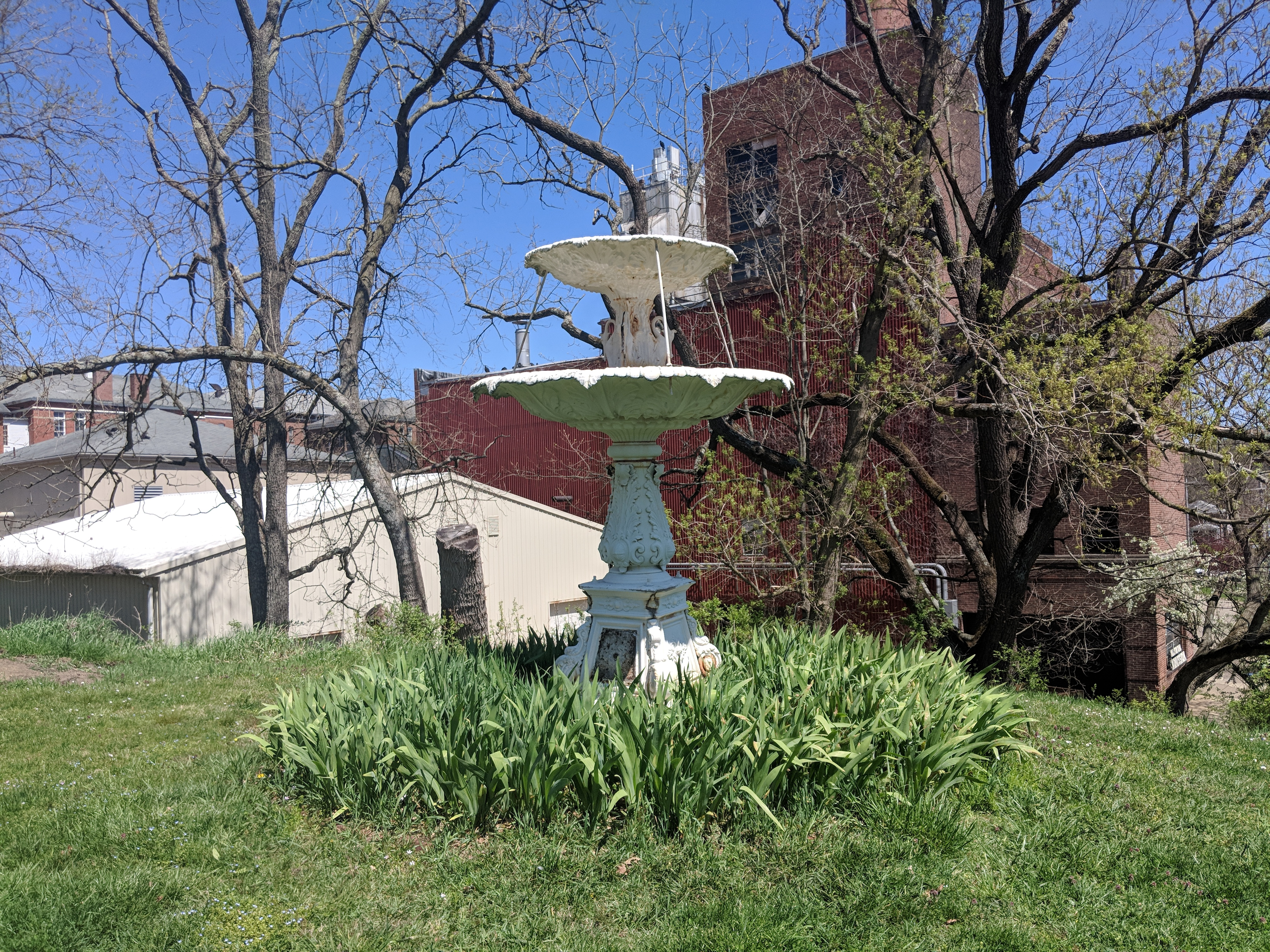
Fountain at The Ridges

The first railroad reached Athens in 1857. In the late 19th century, an interurban line opened between Athens and Nelsonville and operated for some years. The Athens Lunatic Asylum, later named the Athens State Hospital, opened in 1874. This was on high ground to the south of town and to the south of the Hocking River. In the late 19th century the hospital was the town's largest employer. The state hospital was eventually decommissioned and the property was deeded to Ohio University. It is now known as The Ridges. Much of the building space has been renovated for offices and research space or demolished, and most of the grounds have been set aside as open space, including a land lab.

In 1904, the U. S. Army and the Ohio National Guard conducted joint training exercises near the city. Multiple US army regulars became drunk and were arrested by National Guard Provosts for causing disturbances. The arrests angered the regulars; on Friday a large contingent set out from camp to free an arrested comrade. The armed regulars were stopped by provosts and the ensuing quarrel quickly escalated into a shoot-out on Washington Street, during which one guardsman was killed and five others were wounded.

By 1935, Athens was known as a coal and fruit-producing region and a state center of higher education and psychiatric care. The major manufactured goods included stoves, lumber, parquetry flooring, caskets, and flooring.

Following a flood in 1968, 5.5 miles (8.9 km) of the Hocking River was rechanneled through the city.

The university (and in turn, the city) saw large growth during the post-World War Two era and again during the Vietnam War era. Growth slowed in the 1980s with small increases in growth into present times.

== Geography ==
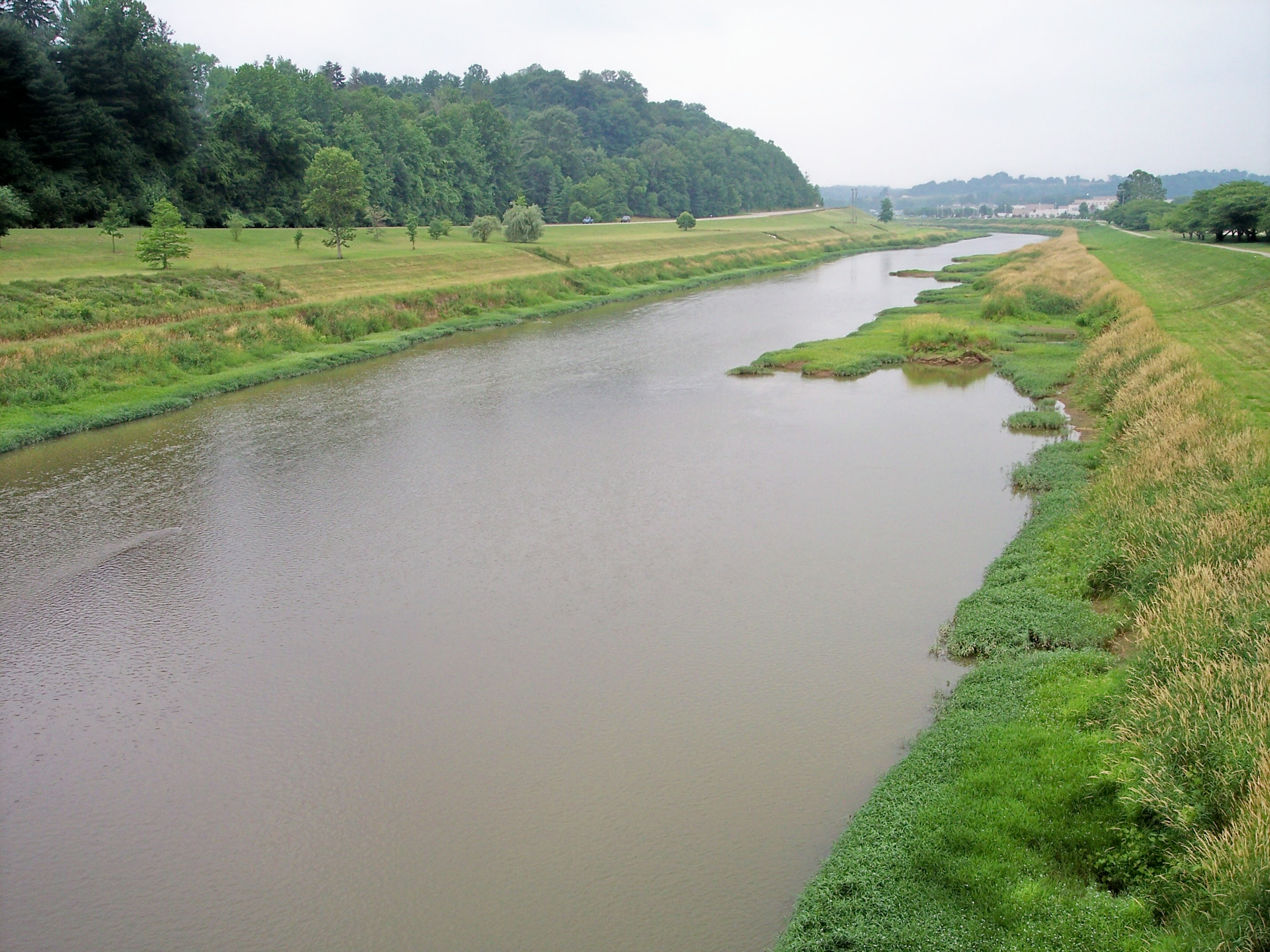
Hocking River in 2006

Athens is located in the unglaciated Allegheny Plateau about 47 miles (76 km) from Chillicothe, Ohio and 35 miles (56 km) west of Marietta, Ohio. Athens is surrounded by hills that rise about 300 feet (91 m) from river valley to the narrow ridge tops. The county extends west from the Ohio River, mostly centered around the lower Hocking River watershed.

According to the 2010 census, the city has a total area of 10.05 square miles (26.0 km^{2}), of which 9.83 square miles (25.5 km^{2})—or 97.81%—is land, and 0.22 square miles (0.57 km^{2})—or 2.19%—is water. Large sections of Athens and Ohio University are located in the floodplain of the Hocking River. Over the last two centuries the town suffered from many destructive floods, including notable floods in 1832, 1873, 1907, 1937, 1949, 1964 and 1968. In 1969 the United States Army Corps of Engineers completed a major work that rerouted and expanded the channel of the Hocking River, for a stretch of several miles around the town, moving the river hundreds of feet to the south.

=== Climate ===
Athens has a hot-summer humid continental climate (Köppen Dfa), typical of most of Ohio.

Climate data for Athens, Ohio (1991–2020 normals, extremes 1893–present)
Month	Jan	Feb	Mar	Apr	May	Jun	Jul	Aug	Sep	Oct	Nov	Dec	Year
Record high °F (°C)	77 (25)	80 (27)	88 (31)	93 (34)	95 (35)	102 (39)	106 (41)	104 (40)	100 (38)	92 (33)	85 (29)	80 (27)	106 (41)
Mean daily maximum °F (°C)	38.0 (3.3)	42.2 (5.7)	52.2 (11.2)	65.2 (18.4)	72.3 (22.4)	79.5 (26.4)	82.4 (28.0)	81.5 (27.5)	76.2 (24.6)	65.2 (18.4)	53.2 (11.8)	42.6 (5.9)	62.5 (16.9)
Daily mean °F (°C)	29.8 (−1.2)	32.8 (0.4)	41.1 (5.1)	52.4 (11.3)	61.1 (16.2)	69.4 (20.8)	72.7 (22.6)	71.4 (21.9)	65.0 (18.3)	53.8 (12.1)	42.6 (5.9)	34.6 (1.4)	52.2 (11.2)
Mean daily minimum °F (°C)	21.5 (−5.8)	23.4 (−4.8)	30.1 (−1.1)	39.7 (4.3)	50.0 (10.0)	59.2 (15.1)	63.0 (17.2)	61.4 (16.3)	53.8 (12.1)	42.4 (5.8)	32.1 (0.1)	26.7 (−2.9)	41.9 (5.5)
Record low °F (°C)	−28 (−33)	−15 (−26)	−8 (−22)	12 (−11)	26 (−3)	33 (1)	35 (2)	36 (2)	24 (−4)	12 (−11)	4 (−16)	−26 (−32)	−28 (−33)
Average precipitation inches (mm)	2.89 (73)	2.94 (75)	3.57 (91)	3.78 (96)	4.20 (107)	4.50 (114)	4.34 (110)	3.16 (80)	3.18 (81)	2.93 (74)	2.91 (74)	3.16 (80)	41.56 (1,056)
Average snowfall inches (cm)	5.8 (15)	5.9 (15)	2.3 (5.8)	0.1 (0.25)	0.0 (0.0)	0.0 (0.0)	0.0 (0.0)	0.0 (0.0)	0.0 (0.0)	0.0 (0.0)	0.5 (1.3)	3.0 (7.6)	17.6 (45)
Average precipitation days (≥ 0.01 in)	13.3	11.4	12.1	12.2	13.9	12.1	11.3	10.1	8.7	10.1	10.3	12.7	138.2
Average snowy days (≥ 0.1 in)	5.2	4.5	1.9	0.3	0.0	0.0	0.0	0.0	0.0	0.0	0.6	3.3	15.8
Source: NOAA

== Demographics ==
Historical population
Census	Pop.	Note	%±
1810	578		—
1820	1,094		89.3%
1830	728		−33.5%
1840	710		−2.5%
1850	808		13.8%
1860	2,852		253.0%
1870	1,696		−40.5%
1880	2,457		44.9%
1890	2,620		6.6%
1900	3,066		17.0%
1910	5,463		78.2%
1920	6,418		17.5%
1930	7,252		13.0%
1940	7,696		6.1%
1950	11,660		51.5%
1960	16,470		41.3%
1970	23,310		41.5%
1980	19,801		−15.1%
1990	21,265		7.4%
2000	21,342		0.4%
2010	23,832		11.7%
2020	23,849		0.1%
2025 (est.)	25,313		6.1%

=== 2020 census ===
As of the 2020 census, Athens had a population of 23,849. The median age was 22.1 years. 8.1% of residents were under the age of 18 and 6.5% of residents were 65 years of age or older. For every 100 females there were 95.1 males, and for every 100 females age 18 and over there were 94.9 males age 18 and over.

98.6% of residents lived in urban areas, while 1.4% lived in rural areas.

There were 7,532 households in Athens, of which 15.1% had children under the age of 18 living in them. Of all households, 19.6% were married-couple households, 36.9% were households with a male householder and no spouse or partner present, and 36.9% were households with a female householder and no spouse or partner present. About 40.6% of all households were made up of individuals and 6.7% had someone living alone who was 65 years of age or older.

There were 8,184 housing units, of which 8.0% were vacant. Among occupied housing units, 26.0% were owner-occupied and 74.0% were renter-occupied. The homeowner vacancy rate was 1.7% and the rental vacancy rate was 6.6%.

Racial composition as of the 2020 census
Race	Number	Percent
White	18,925	79.4%
Black or African American	2,192	9.2%
American Indian and Alaska Native	127	0.5%
Asian	974	4.1%
Native Hawaiian and Other Pacific Islander	2	<0.1%
Some other race	415	1.7%
Two or more races	1,214	5.1%
Hispanic or Latino (of any race)	988	4.1%

=== 2010 census ===
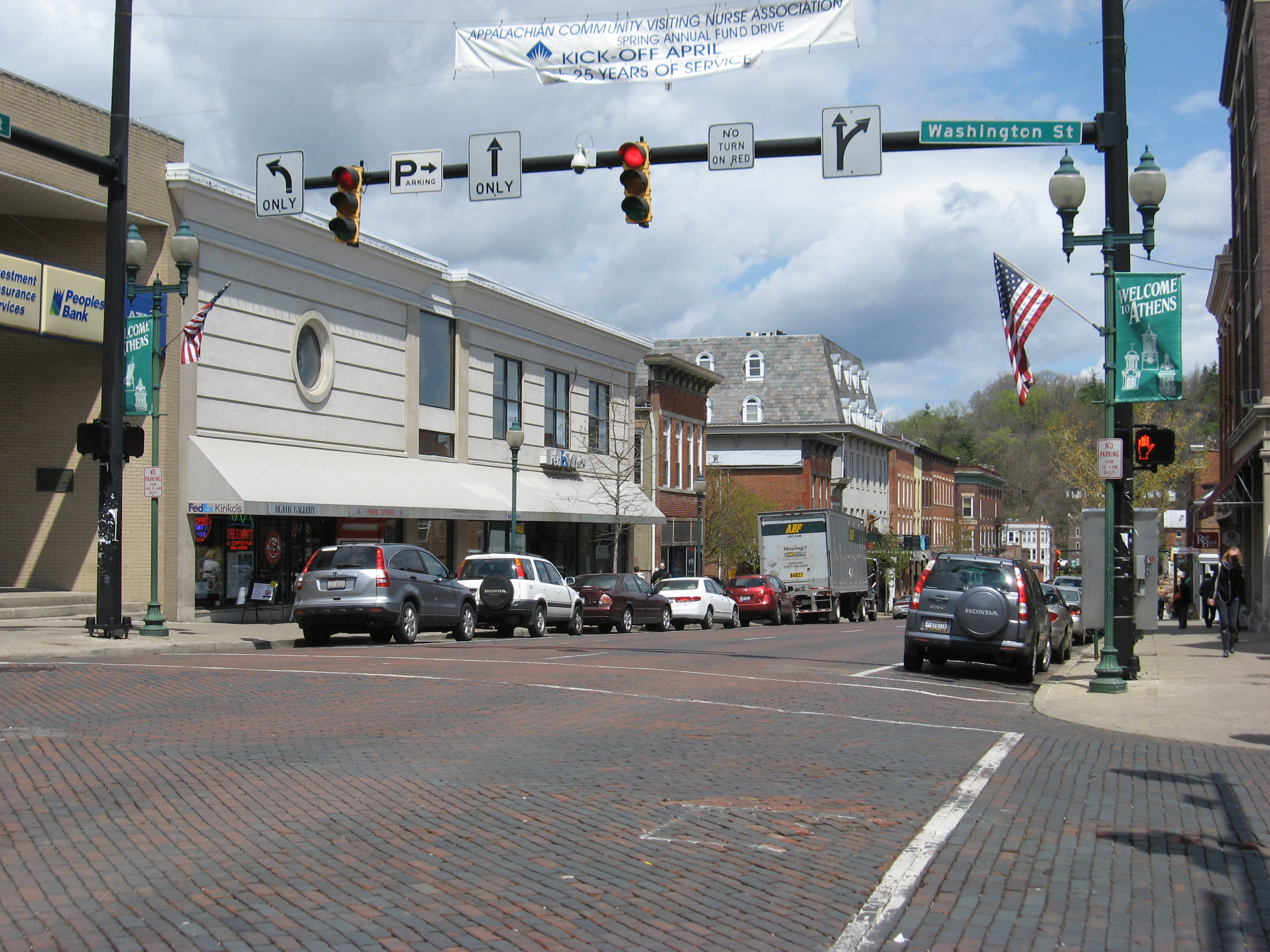
Court Street, the main street in Uptown Athens

As of the census of 2010, there were 23,832 people, 6,903 households, and 1,842 families residing in the city. The population density was 2,424.4 inhabitants per square mile (936.1/km^{2}). There were 7,391 housing units at an average density of 751.9 per square mile (290.3/km^{2}). The racial makeup of the city was 86.4% White, 4.4% African American, 0.2% Native American, 6.1% Asian, 0.6% from other races, and 2.3% from two or more races. Hispanic or Latino of any race were 2.4% of the population.

There were 6,903 households, of which 11.8% had children under the age of 18 living with them, 20.5% were married couples living together, 4.2% had a female householder with no husband present, 2.1% had a male householder with no wife present, and 73.3% were non-families. 33.8% of all households were made up of individuals, and 5% had someone living alone who was 65 years of age or older. The average household size was 2.28 and the average family size was 2.74.

The median age in the city was 21.6 years. 5.8% of residents were under the age of 18; 67.6% were between the ages of 18 and 24; 14.4% were from 25 to 44; 7.9% were from 45 to 64; and 4.3% were 65 years of age or older. The gender makeup of the city was 50.0% male and 50.0% female.

=== 2000 census ===
As of the census of 2000, there were 21,342 people, 6,271 households, and 1,906 families residing in the city. The population density was 2,560.4 people per square mile (988.6 people/km^{2}). There were 6,715 housing units at an average density of 805.6 per square mile (311.0/km^{2}). The racial makeup of the city was 89.16% White, 3.82% Black or African American, 0.15% Native American, 4.47% Asian, 0.06% Pacific Islander, 0.60% from other races, and 1.74% from two or more races. Hispanic or Latino of any race were 1.41% of the population.

There were 6,271 households, out of which 12.9% had children under the age of 18 living with them, 22.9% were married couples living together, 5.6% had a female householder with no husband present, and 69.6% were non-families. 34.5% of all households were made up of individuals, and 6.6% had someone living alone who was 65 years of age or older. The average household size was 2.25 and the average family size was 2.72.

In the city the population was spread out, with 6.7% under the age of 18, 66.7% from 18 to 24, 13.7% from 25 to 44, 8.0% from 45 to 64, and 4.9% who were 65 years of age or older. The median age was 22 years. For every 100 females, there were 88.2 males. For every 100 females age 18 and over, there were 86.9 males.

The median income for a household in the city was $17,122, and the median income for a family was $53,391. Males had a median income of $35,849 versus $28,866 for females. The per capita income for the city was $11,061. About 14.8% of families and 51.9% of the population were below the poverty line, including 19.1% of those under age 18 and 7.2% of those age 65 or over.

== Economy ==
Ohio University is the largest employer in Athens County. In addition to direct employment through the university, much of the local economy depends on tourism and events related to the university, through local restaurants, bars, stores and hotels. Manufacturing and technology related businesses, including Quidel Corporation (formerly Diagnostic Hybrids), and Stewart-MacDonald.

== Arts and culture ==
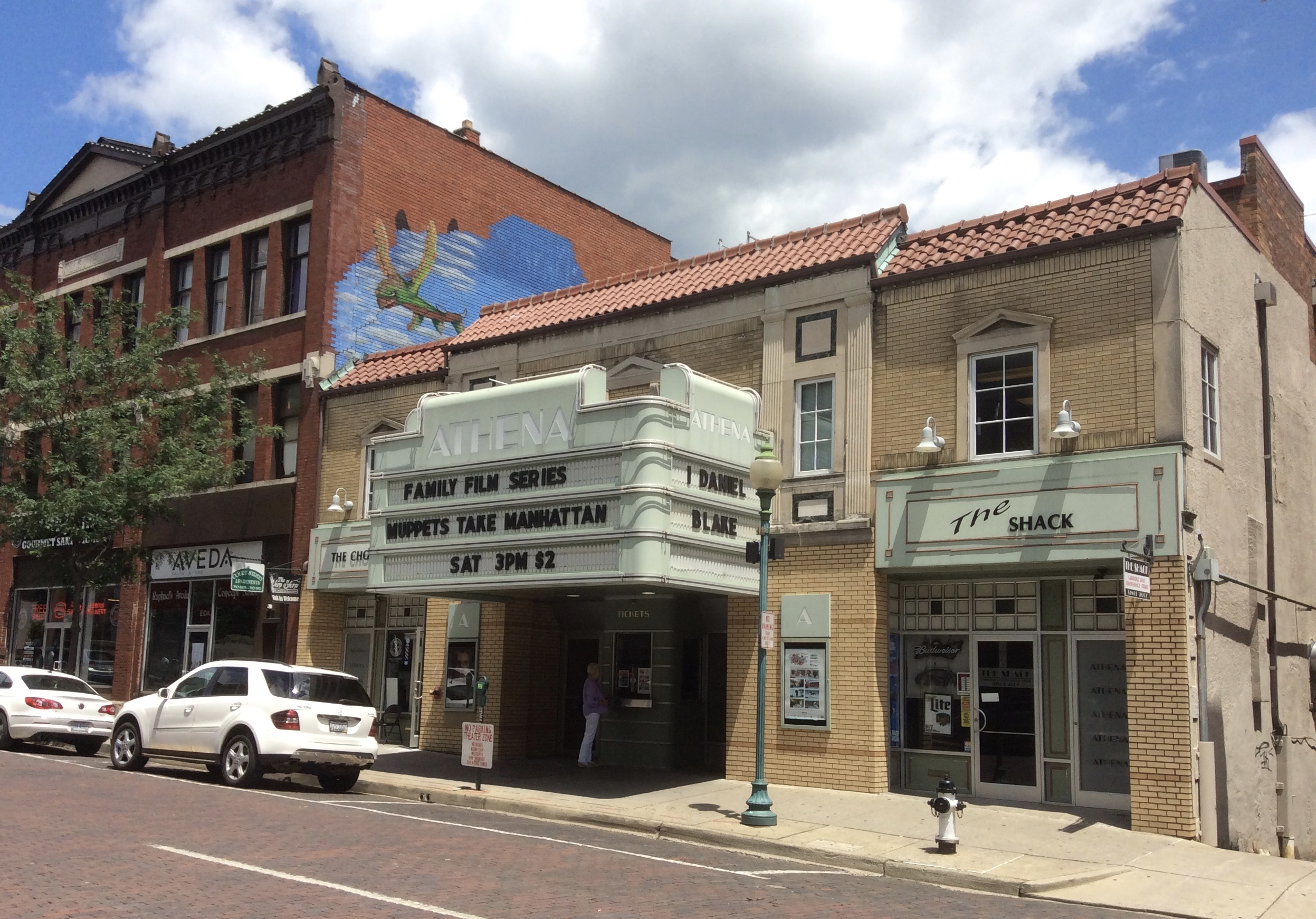
The Athena Cinema

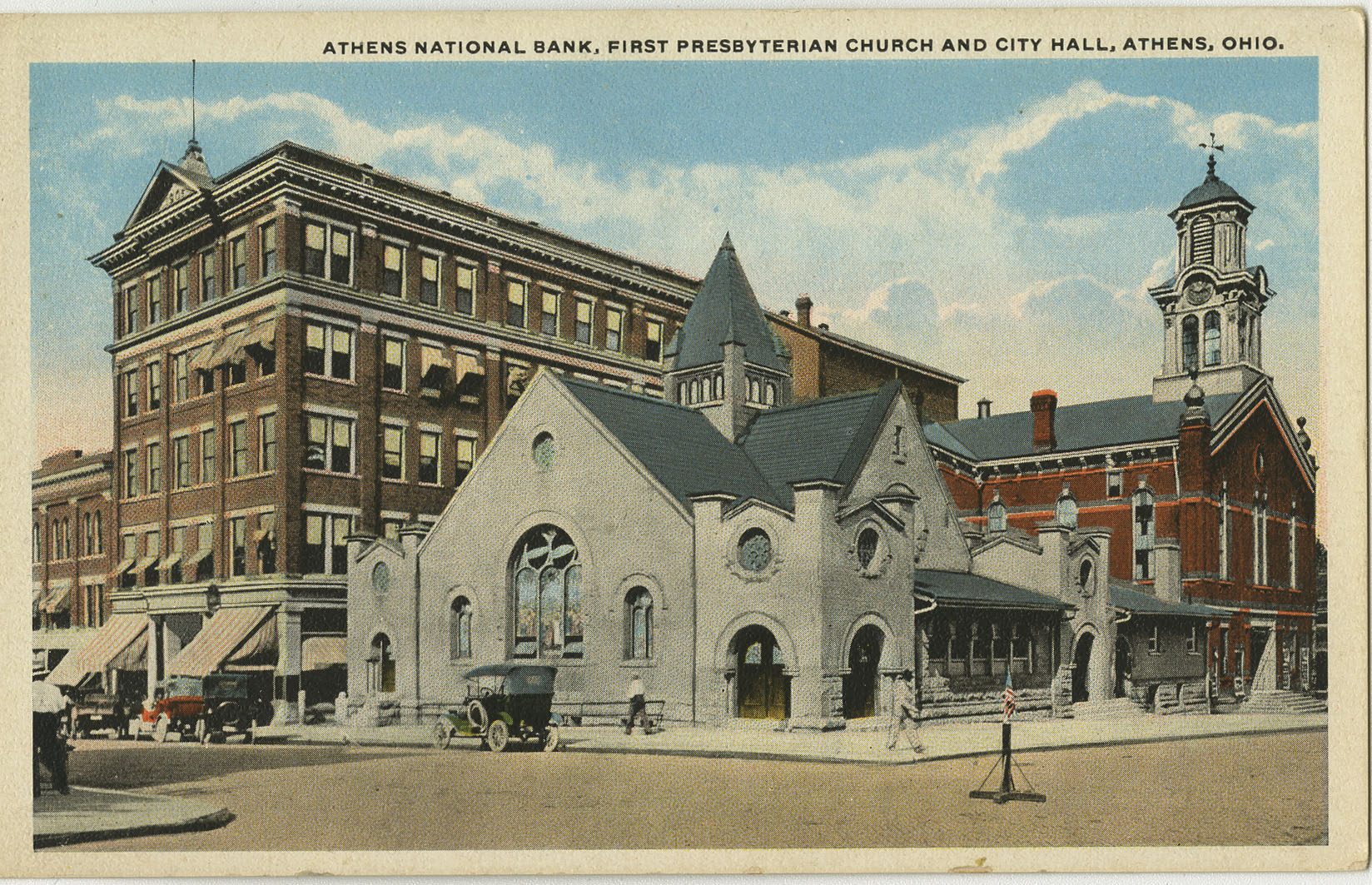
City Hall and the First Presbyterian Church on a pre-1923 postcard

Athens has a long musical tradition that includes local acts and events for touring musicians, performing at Ohio University and festivals in Athens. The folk song "Athens County" – words by Joe Dolce; music by Jonathan Edwards – refers to Athens, Ohio, where Edwards & Dolce attended college in the late 60s. Edwards went on to have a Number 2 hit song nationally with 'Sunshine' while Dolce moved to Australia and had an international Number 1 hit with Shaddap You Face. Dolce is now an established poet and essayist in Melbourne. Bands hailing from Athens include The Headstone Circus, The Snapdragons, Appalachian Death Ride, She Bears, Southeast Engine, The Ridges and the metal band Skeletonwitch.

Several theater companies have operated in Athens over the years. Studio for Young Actors, aka Drama Club Youth Academy was a youth theater which operated from 2000 to approximately 2010. They performed both original and published plays and musicals featuring young actors. Their main venue was Stuart's Opera House in Nelsonville, Ohio They subsequently moved their performance venue to Arts/West a community arts space in Athens, Ohio, operated by the City of Athens.

=== Annual festivals ===
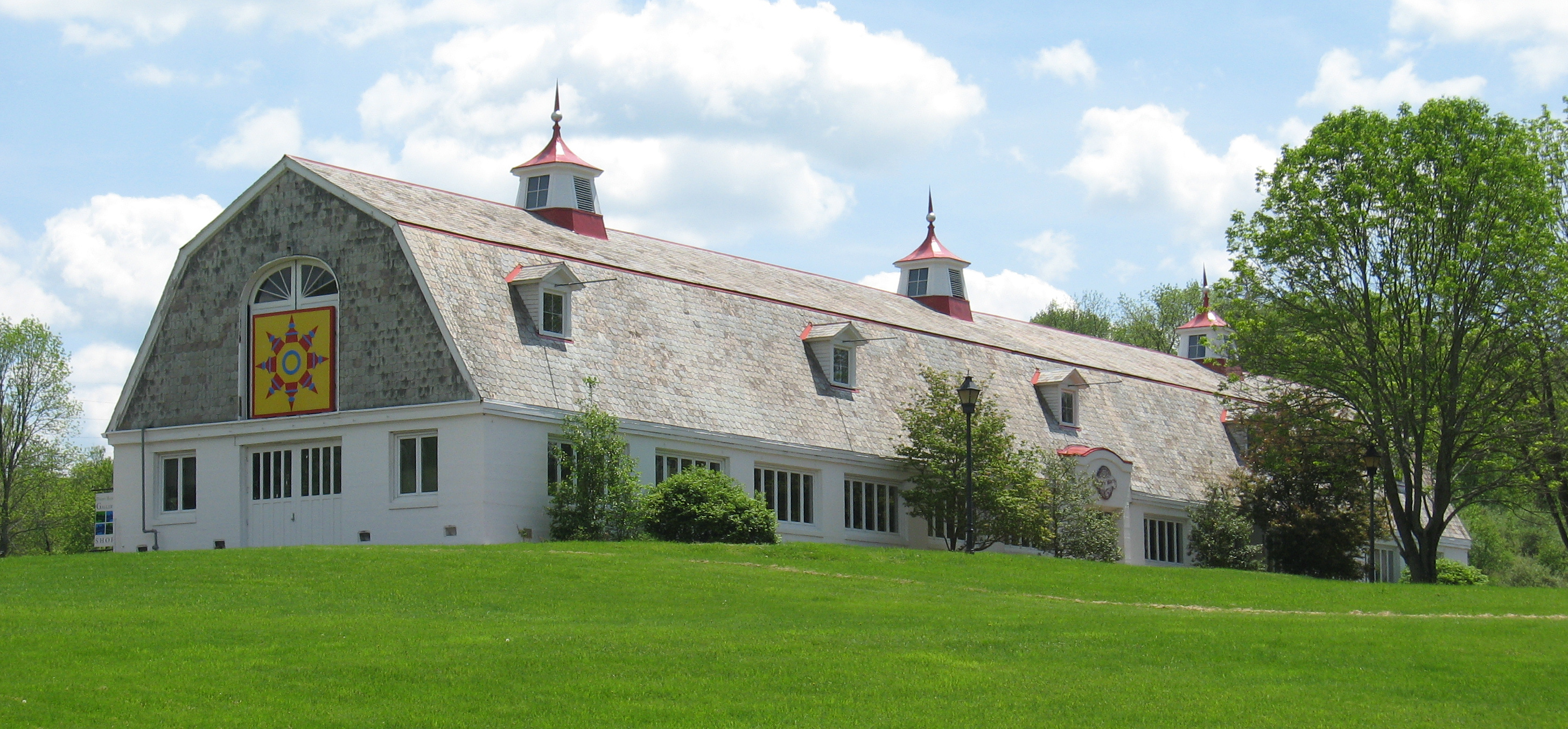
Dairy Barn Cultural Arts Center

- Athens is home to the annual Halloween Block Party, a massive international spectacle that draws attention from news media across the world each year. Ohio University's citation as the world's most haunted institution of higher education by the British Psychical Institute; Athens's citation as one of the 10 most haunted American cities; and the annual Halloween celebration, have dually added to Athens's reputation as one of the 10 most terrifying places on Earth and the "World Capital of Halloween". Athens was vaunted as one of the top fifteen most haunted cities in America on the Fox Family Channel special "Scariest Places On Earth" that aired on October 23, 2000. Locals with knowledge of the history of The Ridges criticized the Fox portrayal as sensationalistic and misleading on details of the situation.
- Blackout Fest is held annually at The Union Bar & Grill and features many local, national, and international indie rock acts.
- The Athens Community Music Festival is held each August. In 2017 two dozen local bands were involved.
- Starting in 2004, Ohio University Seniors Dominic Petrozzi and Timothy Kehoe created One Fest. The festival name is changed each year to represent the number of years it has been held (for example, 2011 was 8Fest). As of 9 Fest, the event has been held at its new location on West Union Street, just outside the campus. It has become one of the largest independent collegiate music festivals in the country, boasting previous performances by national recording artists such as Mike Posner, Machine Gun Kelly, Timeflies, Chip Tha Ripper, Wiz Khalifa, Kendrick Lamar, Steve Aoki and more. in 2008, the name of the festival was changed to "The Number Fest" with an updated "edition" for each year it takes place. Number Fest – 14th Edition will be held on April 16, 2016.
- Lobsterfest is an annual free concert hosted by the university's All Campus Radio Network.
- Ohio Brew Week, founded in 2005 as a way to increase commerce in the town of Athens while students were away for summer, has grown into a nine-day festival including dozens of Ohio craft breweries and hundreds of beers. Notable attendees have included Brooklyn Brewery president Steve Hindy and co-founder of Great Lakes Brewing Company Pat Conway. Events typically include keg tappings, live performances at local venues, and the "last call" street festival.

== Parks and recreation ==
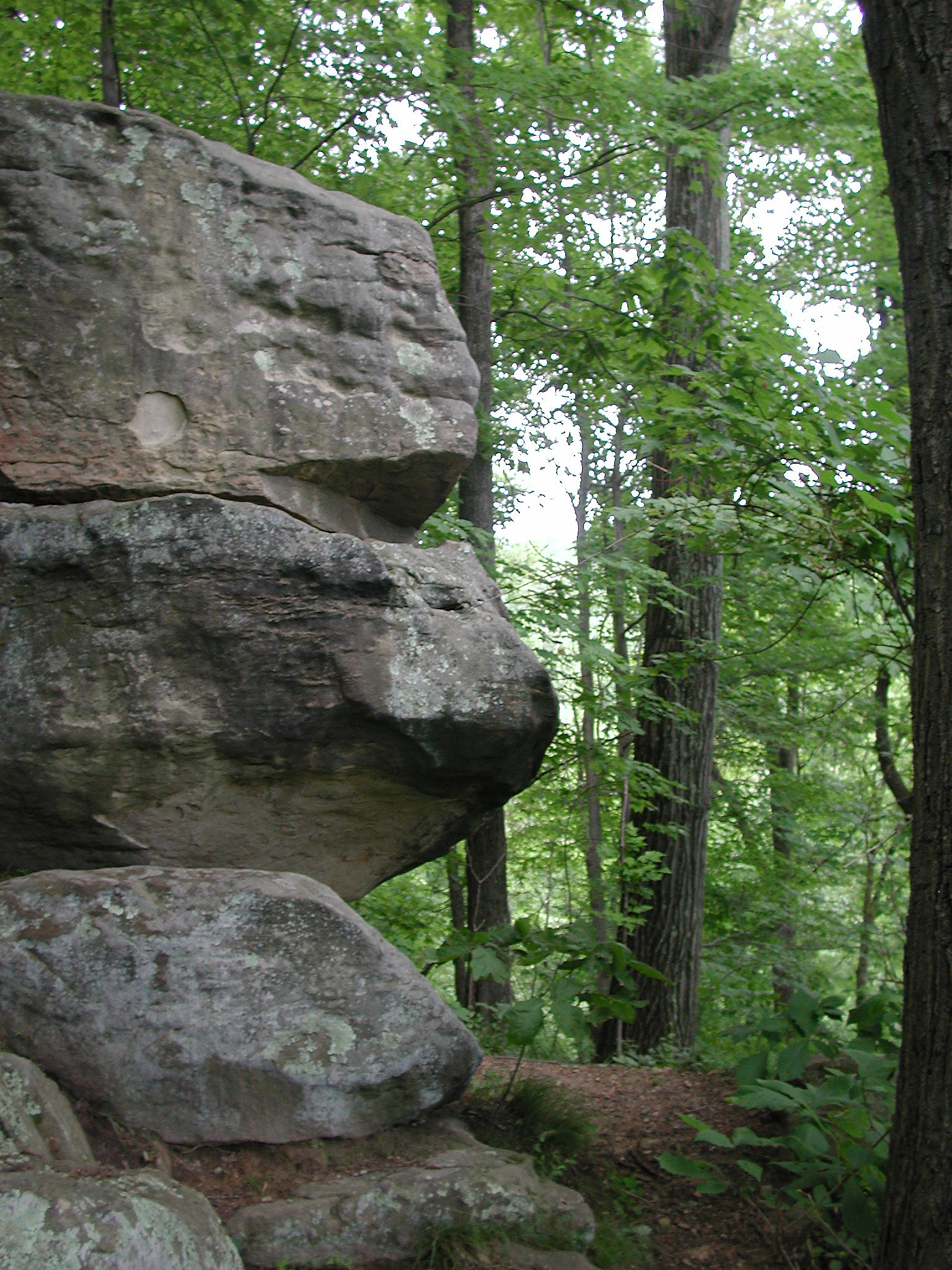
Sells Park Lookout

The Hockhocking Adena Bikeway is a multi-use asphalt trail with its main hub (mile marker 0) at the Athens Community Center on East State Street. The trail extends 16.4 miles (26.4 km) northwest to Robbins' Crossing and Hocking College in Nelsonville and on to the Rocky Brands complex near the Public Square, and approximately 1.5 miles (2.4 km) further east along East State Street and US Route 50 to South Canaan Road (Athens County Road 24A). Access points with parking are located at mile 4 at the West State Street Park, mile 10.2 off Rt. 682 in The Plains, and mile 16.4 at Robbins' Crossing and Hocking College. The trail, which generally follows the course of the Hocking River, provides access to the East State Street commercial areas, Ohio University's campus (at South Green and Peden Stadium), The Plains, and Hocking College. It is designed for walking, running, biking, cross-country skiing, skating, and wheelchairs. Additionally several city streets are marked as bike lanes.

Athens is a qualified Tree City USA as recognized by the National Arbor Day Foundation.

=== Trails ===
The Athens Trail Network is a multi-use trail network branching out from Sells Park at the end of Avon Place. A series of twelve trails and connectors branch out into the surrounding woods, heading eastwards to eventually connect with the trails of Strouds Run State Park. The trails are designed for hiking, running, and biking, although some sections are off-limits to bicycles. The trails provide scenic views of the East State Street commercial area and travel past and through notable features such as Sells Pond, Riddle State Nature Preserve (also known as Hawk Woods), Boulder Cove, Turtlehead Cave (also known as Blue Ash Rockhouse), Finger Rock, Pioneer Cemetery, and Dow Lake at Strouds Run State Park. The trail network is maintained by community and university volunteers.

== Government ==
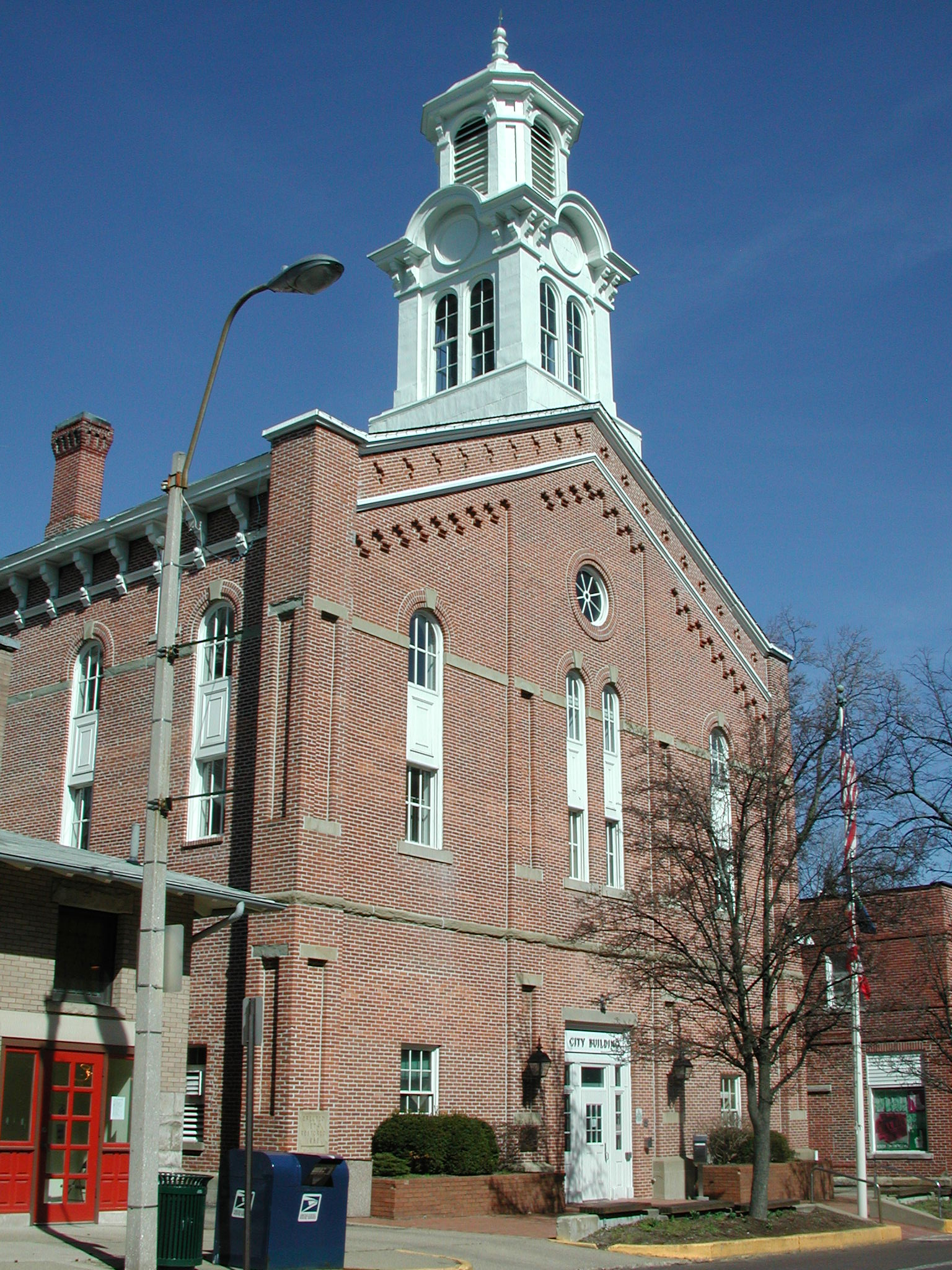
Athens City Hall

As of 2026, the mayor of Athens is Steve Patterson. A Democrat, Patterson was elected to his third term as mayor in 2023. As of 2025, Patterson also serves as president of the National League of Cities.

The city has had a police department since 1911, which staffs approximately 30 police officers plus a like number of reserve officers and support staff. Ohio University also has a police force with about 25 officers. The Athens fire department was founded in 1830 and became full-time in the 1930s; it has two stations with a staff of about 30 and covers both the city and the Ohio University campus. The city is part of the county-wide Enhanced 911 system, which is able to locate landline or registered cell phone users, and send a text or phone call message of alert to those who sign up.

Athens is under the jurisdiction of the Athens County Department of Health, the Athens County Planning Office, and Athens County Job and Family Services. The city has a large number of rental homes/apartments which are inspected by the Housing Code Office.

== Education ==
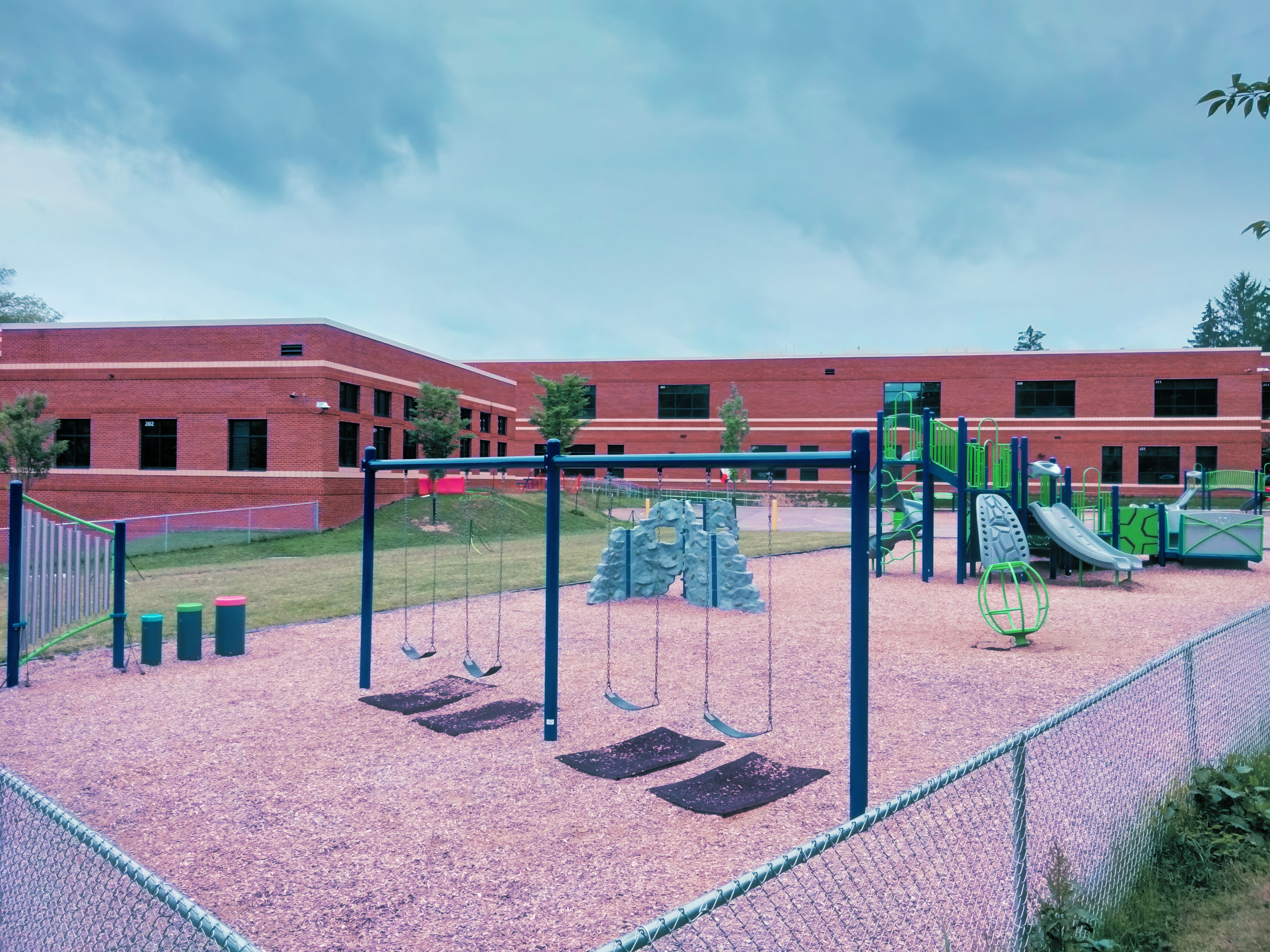
Athens East Elementary

Ohio University is a public university located in Athens (30,000+ students) that is situated on an 1,800-acre (7.3 km^{2}) campus. Founded in 1804, it is the oldest university in Ohio, oldest in the Northwest Territory, and ninth oldest public university in the United States. Known as the Bobcats, Ohio University hosts over 250 academic programs, 5,300 employees, and has been recognized by the John Templeton Foundation as one of the top character building institutions in the country. In addition to its main campus in Athens, Ohio University also operates regional campuses in Chillicothe, Cleveland, Dublin, Ironton (Ohio University – Southern), Lancaster, Pickerington, Proctorville, St. Clairsville (Ohio University – Eastern), and Zanesville.

Outside of Ohio University, the residents of Athens are served by the Athens City School District, founded in the late 1840s. Currently it consists of 5 schools: East Elementary (PK-3), Morrison Gordon Elementary (PK-3), The Plains Intermediate School (4–6), Athens Middle School (grades 7–8), and Athens High School home of the 'Bulldogs' and Joe Burrow Stadium. East Elementary and Morrison Gordon Elementary were replaced with new buildings on the same locations, and opened in Fall 2021, and The Plains Intermediate was significantly remodeled for a re-opening in Fall 2022. In 2019, a new Athens High School was scheduled to begin design and construction in 2024 with a planned Fall 2026 opening. As a result of COVID and other work-related delays, work has not yet begun, but as a result of a tax-funded levy passed in November 2023 giving a $24 million bond to the Athens City School District (ACSD), as well as $28.5 million from the OFCC CFAP, construction will begin in 2025 and be completed within an estimated 18 to 30 months.

On the city's east side, Athens has a public library, a branch of the Athens County Public Libraries.

== Media ==
- The Athens Messenger, Athens' oldest newspaper, founded in 1848. Published five days per week.

== Infrastructure ==
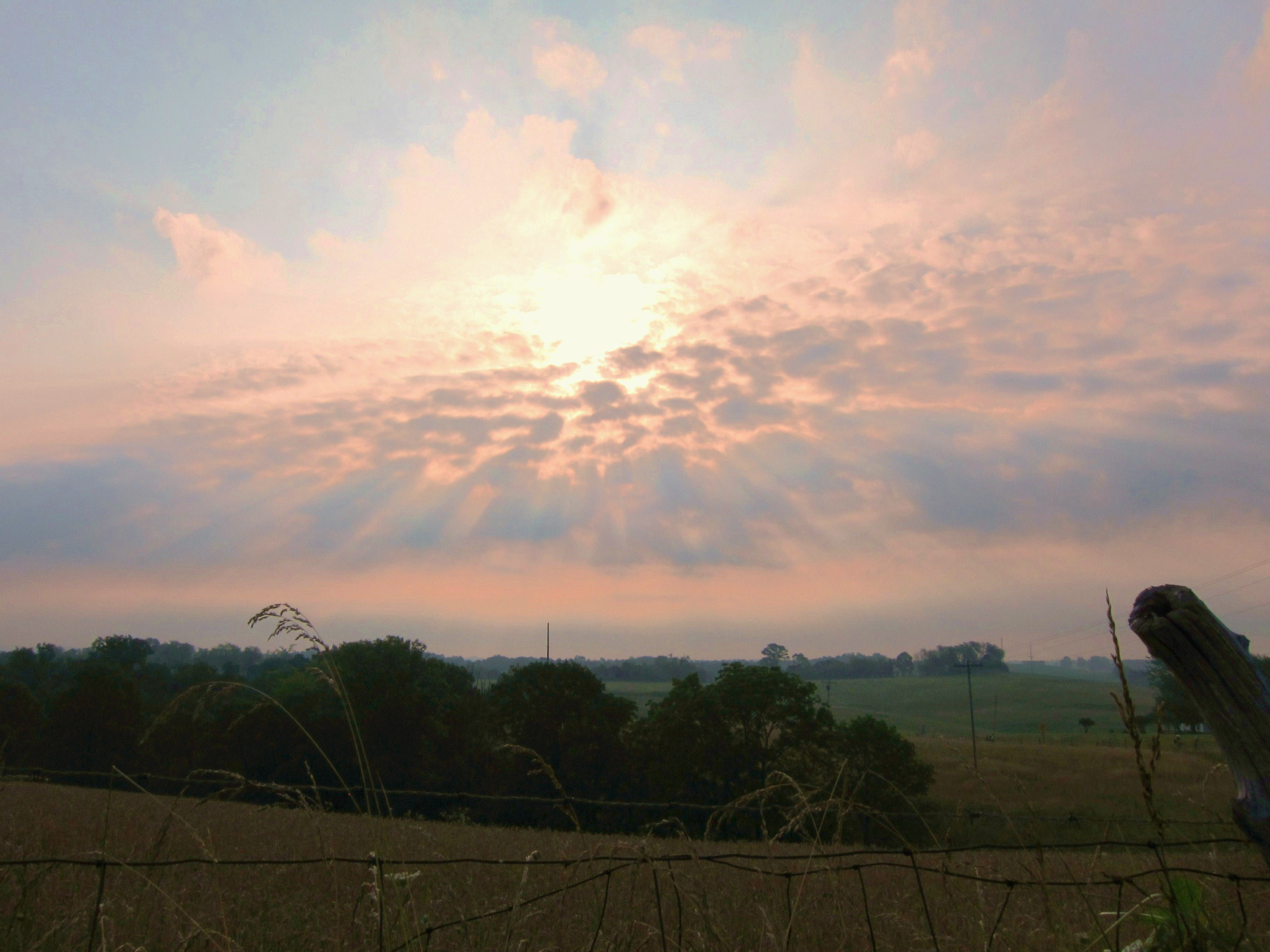
Hockhocking Adena Bikeway from Athens to Nelsonville

=== Transportation ===
Railroad came to the city in the 1850s, with the last passenger train ending in 1981. That left a few freight trains passing near the city. Until 1981, Amtrak's Shenandoah (Cincinnati – Washington, D.C.) stopped at Athens station. In earlier years, the daily B&O trains, Diplomat (St. Louis – Jersey City, NJ) and National Limited (St. Louis – Jersey City, NJ) stopped at the station.

Gordon K. Bush Airport is located ten nautical miles (12 mi; 19 km) southwest of Athens's central business district.

Athens has a public bus system which is free to OU students and staff and at a reduced price for seniors and school age students. It has several routes inside the city and one to The Plains. OU has a bus system that links with a city bus system. Many student apartment complexes have their own bus shuttle. Athens also has an inter-city bus line from Athens to Columbus, Cincinnati, Marietta, Ohio, and Cleveland–the GoBus–running twice a day with stops in-between.

=== Health care ===
At Ohio University the Heritage College of Osteopathic Medicine was established in 1975. It is currently the only osteopathic medical school in the state and offers the degree Doctor of Osteopathic Medicine (D.O.). The college is accredited by the American Osteopathic Association. In 1993, Barbara Ross-Lee, D.O., was appointed to the position of dean of the Heritage College of Osteopathic Medicine; she was the first African-American woman to serve as the dean of a U.S. medical school. The Heritage College of Osteopathic Medicine has 814 students enrolled across three campuses in Athens, Cleveland, and Dublin. Ohio University partners with University Medical Associates (UMA), which was founded in 2003, and is a wide-ranging medical service provider in multiple locations around the Athens area, both on campus and off. UMA's mission is to deliver health care services to the residents of southeastern Ohio while providing clinical training opportunities for future osteopathic physicians.

Ohio University also runs Campus Care, which is an on-campus clinic for enrolled students.

Additionally, Athens is served by OhioHealth O'Bleness Memorial Hospital a 140+ bed non-profit community hospital founded in the early 1920s as Sheltering Arms Hospital. O'Bleness, built in the early 1970s, overlooks the Hocking River and is near the university campus. O'Bleness emergency department (as well as the lab & radiology) is open 24/7 365 days at year. The hospital has a helipad located near the ED. On the hospital grounds is the Cornwell Center, which houses a catheterization lab, cardiac/pulmonary rehabilitation program as well as medical offices. The Castrop Center houses Athens Cancer Center, medical offices plus a public pharmacy. A new 2 story Doctor's Park building open in 2021 with doctor offices, including exams and Lab. O'Bleness was in a management agreement with OhioHealth from 2010 until early 2014 when O'Bleness became a whole part of the OhioHealth system.

== Notable people ==
- Gwyneth Philips, professional ice hockey goaltender, Olympic gold medalist at the 2026 Winter Olympics
