= Music Factory =

UK promotional remix service and music company

Music Factory Entertainment Group
- Logo used for Mastermix
- Formation: 1980s (service origins; see History)
- Headquarters: Rotherham, South Yorkshire, England
- Region served: United Kingdom
- Products: Promotional DJ compilations and remix services
- Website: mastermixdj.com

Music Factory Entertainment Group is a United Kingdom-based music company associated with the Mastermix promotional remix service for professional disc jockeys.

== Overview ==
Mastermix is marketed as a subscription and download service supplying DJ-focused compilations and mixes, described by the company as intended for professional users rather than the general public.

== History ==
A business trading as The Music Factory is described by local business reporting as beginning in the early 1980s, later developing brands including Mastermix. In July 2023, Music Factory Entertainment reported receiving a £1 million investment from Finance Yorkshire to support expansion of its catalogue and related activity.

== Corporate information ==
In the United Kingdom company register, Mastermix Music Limited was incorporated on 3 March 1994 and has previously been registered under the names Music Factory Holdings Limited and The Music Factory Entertainment Group Limited.

== Catalogues and releases ==
Mastermix releases have included multiple numbered or themed series that are generally distributed as promotional DJ products, while some associated recordings have been commercially released under related branding (including releases associated with Jive Bunny and the Mastermixers).
