= The Snapdragons =

British musical group

- Origin: Leeds, England
- Genre: Alternative rock
- Years active: 1987–1990
- Label: Native
- Past members: James Taylor; John Sullivan; Simon "Spike" Mullings; Pellegrino "Pel" Riccardi

The Snapdragons (sometimes referred to as The Snapdragons UK, to distinguish them from the later American band of the same name) were an indie rock band from Leeds, England. They were led by their singer and main songwriter, James Taylor (not to be confused with The Prisoners mainman or the American singer-songwriter of the same name). They released two albums and four singles in the late 1980s and early 1990s, while signed to the independent record label, Native Records.

== History ==
The band signed to Native Records, who released their first single, "The Things You Want", in 1988, and in February that year they recorded a session for Simon Mayo's BBC Radio 1 show. "The Things You Want" was included on Volume VI of the Indie Top 20 series of albums (and later on Cherry Red Records' C88 compilation). The band's debut album, Dawn Raids on Morality, was produced by Pat Collier and released in 1989. In 1989, they also recorded a session for the BBC Radio 1 DJ, John Peel. The band toured the UK and supported other Native Records acts, such as The Darling Buds and Richard Hawley's debut band, Treebound Story. The band were amongst indie bands tipped to do well in 1990, alongside James, The Family Cat, Asia Fields and The Wood Children. However inconsistent performances by the band, and the departure of John Sullivan and later "Spike" Mullings, hindered the band's ability to reach a wider audience.

The follow-up album The Eternal in a Moment (1990) was a compilation of tracks from singles and EPs not found on the first album, and included "The Things You Want" and "The Eternal in a Moment", which were the band's first two singles.

A second studio album entitled Mass was recorded with Nigel Lister replacing John Sullivan on guitar. However this was not issued by Native, due to legal problems which effectively saw the demise of the band.

Drummer Pel Riccardi went on to join the Utah Saints.

The band's last single, "Dole Boys on Futons", was included on Cherry Red's C89 compilation in 2018.

Simon "Spike" Mullings died in a kayaking accident on 1 September 2024, at the age of 57.

== Personnel ==
- James Taylor (vocals, guitar, main songwriter)
- John Sullivan (guitar, piano, songwriter)
- Simon "Spike" Mullings (bass guitar)
- Pellegrino "Pel" Riccardi (drums)

== Discography ==
7" singles

- 1988 "The Things You Want" - 7NTV 37
- 1989 "The Eternal in a Moment" - 7NTV 47

12" singles

- 1988 "The Things You Want" - 12NTV 37
- 1989 "Dole Boys On Futons" - 12NTV 41
- 1989 "No Expectations" - 12NTV 46
- 1989 "The Eternal in a Moment" - 12NTV 47
- 1989 "Dole Boys on Futons" - CD NTV 41 (3 inch CD)

Albums

- 1989 Dawn Raids on Morality
- 1990 The Eternal in a Moment
