= State (religious life) =

In Christianity, the word state may be taken to signify a profession or calling in life. St. Paul says, in I Corinthians 7:20: "Let every man abide in the same calling in which he was called". States are classified in the Catholic Church as the clerical state, the religious state, and the secular state; and among religious states, again, we have those of the contemplative, the active, and the mixed orders.

In Christianity, another use of the term state is a person's standing before God. Catholic theology and Evangelical Lutheran theology both teach that through the committal of mortal sin, an individual falls from the 'state of grace'. Both Catholicism and Evangelical-Lutheranism teach that through the sacrament of absolution individuals may be restored to the 'state of grace'.

== See also ==
- Catholic religious order
- Consecrated life
- Diocesan priest
- Religious minister
- Secular clergy
- Vocational Discernment in the Catholic Church
