= Fatal Charm (band) =

British rock band

- Origin: Nottingham, England
- Genres: Post-punk; alternative rock; new wave
- Years active: 1978–1989, 2005–2006, 2012
- Labels: Company; Double D; Ariola; Carrere; Native; Really Great; Zimbabel
- Past members: Paul Arnall; David Barker; Kevin Davies; Kevin Gallagher; Sarah Simmonds; Carl Owen
- Website: fatalcharm.co.uk

Fatal Charm (also known as The Fatal Charm) is a post-punk turned alternative rock band that formed in Nottingham, England in 1978.

From 1980 onwards, their musical style contained variations on the alternative rock genre that defied comparison with other emerging UK acts such as Echo & the Bunnymen, the Cure, New Order and Ultravox, who were darker and more introspective. Neither were they as 'poppy' as the female fronted bands that followed, such as T'Pau, the Primitives, and the Darling Buds.

== Early days ==
The band was formed in 1978 by Paul Arnall and quickly took on new members. Over the years, recording deals came and went, due mainly to a great deal of uncertainty and volatility that existed in the music industry at that time. By 1980, the line-up was:

Paul Arnall (guitar, vocals, songwriter)
David Barker (keyboards)
Kevin Davies (bass guitar)
Kevin Gallagher (drums)

The four-piece released four tracks on the 1980 compilation LP East. The collapse of various recording contracts precipitated frequent changes to the personnel, and vocalist Sarah Simmonds joined in the same year, enabling Arnall to concentrate on his writing and musicianship. On occasion, the band was even reduced to the Arnall/Simmonds duo, and they continued to perform live with the aid of reel-to-reel tapes and Simmonds playing keyboards.

The band supported big-name acts like Ultravox and Orchestral Manoeuvres in the Dark on tour, gaining them some media coverage, including an appearance on Channel 4's music television programme The Tube in 1983. They also played two Radio 1 In Concert shows, supporting Ultravox and the Cult.

== Debut album ==
1984's 'Summer Spies'

'Images of Fire' - cover of 1986 U.K. 12" Single

In 1984, the band released their third single titled "Summer Spies". Prior to this, their earlier singles "Paris" and "Christine" had not gained much attention. This track ultimately served as a catalyst for their debut album, Endangered Species, which was released the following year in 1985. In the lead-up to the album's launch, the band also released the singles "King of Comedy" and "You Know (You'll Never Believe)".

Arnall and Simmonds followed up with the single "Images of Fire" in 1986, recorded on 8-track at home released by Native Records and it peaked at No. 16 in the UK Independent Singles Chart. Likewise, 1987's single "Lucille", also released by Native, charted. Around this time, Simmonds revealed interest in writing melodies and hook lines and the pair set about writing more material.

== Second album ==
In 1989, the band's second album, This Strange Attraction was greeted by critical acclaim from most quarters and another radio session arranged for Radio 1's Bob Harris. This time the recording was on their own label - "Really Great Records". Presumably the name paid homage to, or was a parody of, the East Midlands-based "Dead Good Records" later re-released on Native Records. Mansfield's B-Movie included 3 Fatal Charm tracks on the 1979 compilation album East.

By now there had been many Radio 1 sessions for some of the station's DJs, including Janice Long, Andy Peebles, Annie Nightingale and Simon Mayo.

In the wake of the second album, there was considerable media interest in the band and they were offered financial backing, a new management deal and a contract with major label RCA Records. Consequently, the Fatal Charm name was shelved in recognition of a new beginning based on a more ambient dance/pop style of music. State of Grace was born in 1991 and ran through to 1998.

== Retrospective works and live performances ==
In 1996, a retrospective collection of the band's earliest material was released (titled Out of my Head, by the Fatal Charm).

Then in 2005, Arnall returned to the original tapes of various archived recordings, some of them previously unreleased and others unfinished. The keyboards and synthesizers were stripped back and replaced with a cleaner, more contemporary guitar sound. The third Fatal Charm album is simply entitled Pop and includes a re-worked version of "Western Laughter", previously only available as a flexi-disc given away free at early concerts.

Pop, published by the band's own Cycles and Trips label is only available through the website and appears therefore to be a side-project rather than an attempt to re-launch the band in a full-time capacity.

Simmonds has over the years obtained qualifications in music, trained her voice to cover a range of singing styles, become a singing teacher and has sung with internationally acclaimed vocal groups The Swingle Singers (1st alto) and Synergy. Her other credits include contributions to the soundtracks for Troy, Star Wars: Episode III – Revenge of the Sith and Shrek 2; also backing vocals for Björk at the opening ceremony of the 2004 Summer Olympics.

Pop was followed by the release of further retrospective albums featuring the various incarnations of the band. After a lengthy period of inactivity, Fatal Charm performed live dates in March and April 2012 and added more dates throughout the year.

== Discography ==
Albums
Title	Year	Record label	Band Name
Endangered Species	1985	Carrere	Fatal Charm
This Strange Attraction	1989	Really Great	Fatal Charm
Free Thoughts EP (w/ The Bardots and Barenaked Ladies)	1992	Cheree	State of Grace
Pacific Motion	1994	3rd Stone	State of Grace
Jamboreebop	1995	3rd Stone	State of Grace
Hello EP	1995	RCA	State of Grace
Out of My Head	1996	Three Lines	Fatal Charm
Every Day	1997		State of Grace
Everyone Else's Universe	1997	3rd Stone	State of Grace
Sometimes	1998	Zimbabel	State of Grace
Sometimes - More	1999	Zimbabel	State of Grace
Pop	2005	Really Great	Fatal Charm
Lovebrigade	2006	Really Great	Fatal Charm
Plastic (compilation)	2006	Really Great	
Ocean	2007	Zimbabel	State of Grace

Singles
Title	Year	Record label	Band Name
"Paris"	1979	Company	Fatal Charm
"Western Laughter/Dark Eyes"	1980	Double D	Fatal Charm
"Paris/Christine"	1981	Ariola	Fatal Charm
"Summer Spies"	1984	Carrere	Fatal Charm
"You Know (You'll Never Believe)"	1985	Carrere	Fatal Charm
"King of Comedy"	1985	Carrere	Fatal Charm
"Images of Fire"	1986	Native	Fatal Charm
"Lucille"	1987	Native	Fatal Charm
"Camden"	1992	Cheree	State of Grace
"Love, Pain, & Passion"	1992	3rd Stone	State of Grace
"Miss You"	1993	3rd Stone	State of Grace
"Smile"	1995	3rd Stone	State of Grace
