= Friends of the Stars =

English music band

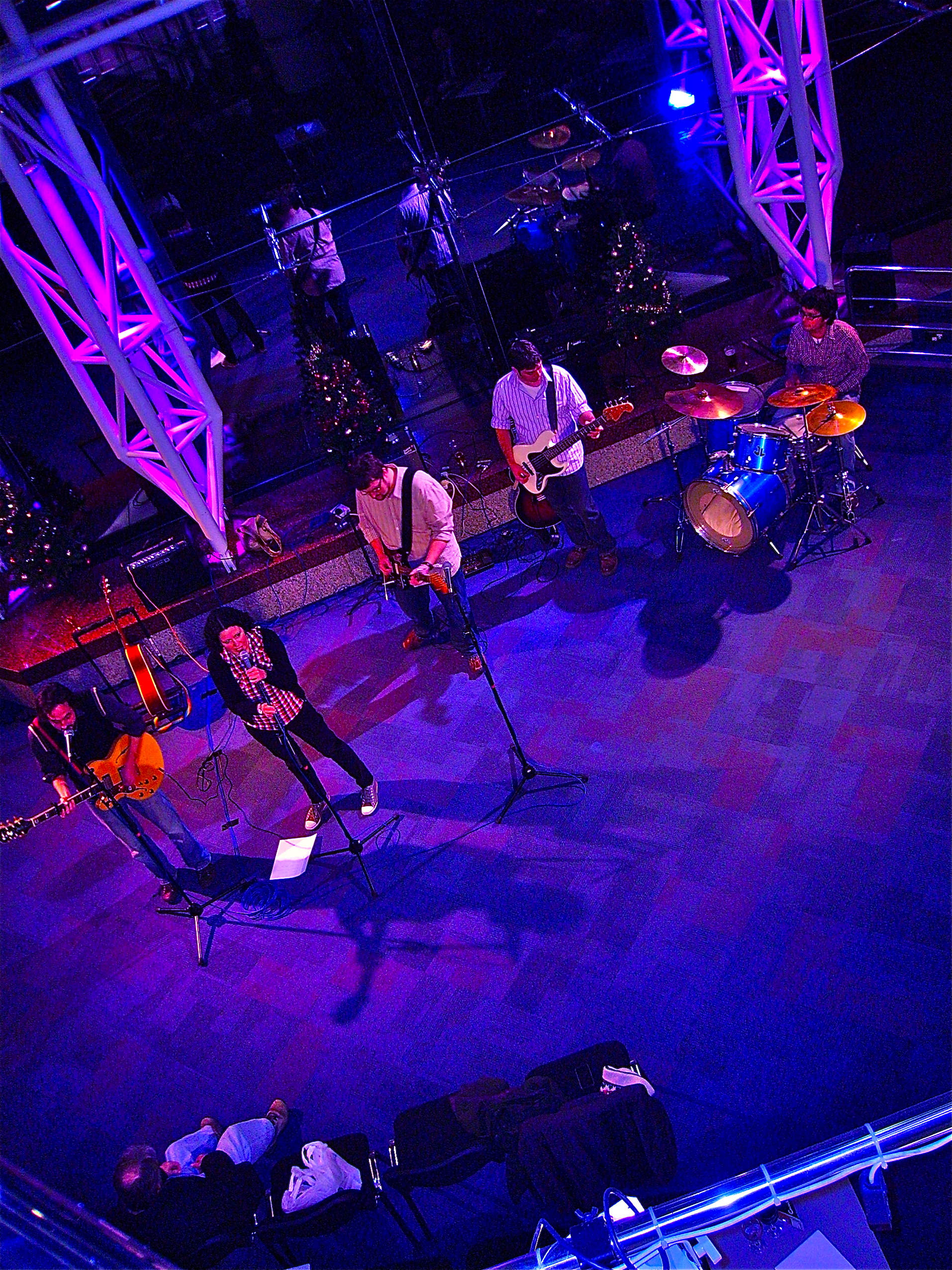
Friends of the Stars live at Birmingham Symphony Hall December 2010

Friends of the Stars, originally known as Buick 6, formed in Birmingham in the late 1990s and quickly became a popular live band associated with the burgeoning alternative country movement and known for catchy, classic songwriting and soaring three-part vocal harmonies. The original line-up, consisting of Craig Hamilton, Anna Russell, Jez Ince, James Summerfield and Nick Wilkinson released two singles on Winnebago Records. After replacing Wilkinson with former Novak drummer Phil Robinson, the band recorded a John Peel session before being forced to change their name following legal threats from an Irish band of the same name.

The band, now known as "The Tocques", went on to record another Peel Session and had several close shaves with major labels through a development deal with Sanctuary Records Group which ultimately didn't work out for either party.

Ayrshire-born singer-songwriter Cam Docherty, who had played with the band on their second Peel Session and at numerous gigs, joined permanently on lead guitar to replace Summerfield who left to pursue a solo career in 2004. The band changed their name to "Friends of the Stars" to draw a line under their underwhelming brush with the corporate music business.

With a new do-it-yourself ethic and renewed sense of purpose, the band began producing their own recordings and released debut album Lighting and Electrical on Commercially Inviable Records in 2007. Follow-up album Faith's Meat Kiosk is due for release on the same label on 23 April 2012. Both albums were mixed by Beth McGowan.

Jez Ince stopped working with the band due to family commitments in 2005 and was replaced on bass by Rachael Dobbie in 2008.
