= List of songs recorded by Jennifer Love Hewitt =

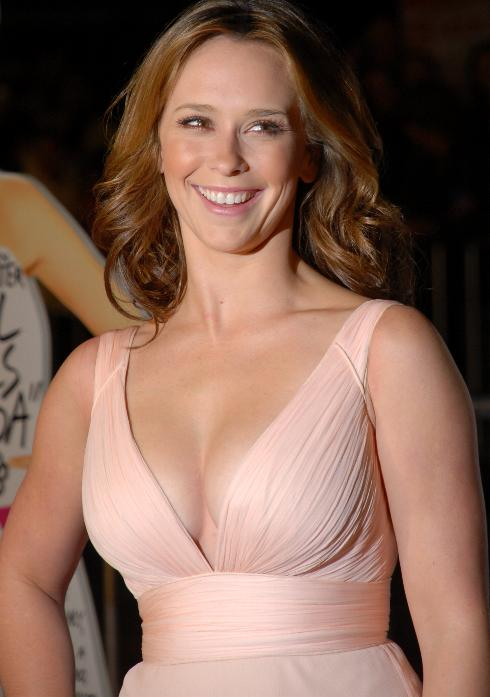
Hewitt attending the premiere of 27 Dresses in Westwood, Los Angeles, January 2008

American actress and singer Jennifer Love Hewitt has recorded songs for four studio albums as well as a number of soundtracks and other projects. Hewitt first rose to prominence in the entertainment industry for acting in television commercials and the children's television series Kids Incorporated. At age 10, she moved with her mother from Killeen, Texas to Los Angeles to pursue a music career, and collaborated with Earth, Wind & Fire on the song "One World" for the 1990 compilation album Music Speaks Louder Than Words. Two years later, Hewitt recorded her first studio album Love Songs (1992) under the name "Love Hewitt". The video game company Meldac released Love Songs exclusively in Japan, and it includes cover versions of songs by ABBA and Michael Jackson. Prior to the album's release, Hewitt released the stand-alone cover of Blondie's "Heart of Glass" earlier in 1990. According to a 2013 Rolling Stone article, Love Songs led to Hewitt becoming a pop star in Japan.

After Hewitt attracted further attention following her role in the family drama Party of Five, she released two studio albums in the United States through Atlantic. Let's Go Bang (1995) featured dance-pop and "light R&B", and her self-titled album (1996) had R&B-inspired pop music and adult contemporary music with lyrics about "love, loss, and longing". Following the two albums' poor sales, Hewitt was dropped by Atlantic and went on to act in several films and television programs. As well as starring in the 1998 slasher film I Still Know What You Did Last Summer, she recorded the 1999 single "How Do I Deal" for its soundtrack, which became the best-selling song of her career. In 2002, Hewitt signed a record contract with Jive, and her fourth studio album BareNaked was released in October that year. Recording "rock-oriented" songs, Hewitt collaborated with Meredith Brooks for the album. Hewitt said that she had more creative freedom with BareNaked since she was "able to find [her]self as an artist". She co-wrote nine of the album's thirteen songs and was involved with its arrangements and instrumentation.

In 2002, Hewitt wrote and recorded "I'm Gonna Love You (Madellaine's Love Song)" for the animated film The Hunchback of Notre Dame II, in which she also voiced the character Madellaine. She appeared in the 2004 television film A Christmas Carol, an adaptation of the original novella, and contributed to its soundtrack. Despite finding commercial success with BareNaked, Hewitt shifted away from music in 2004 to focus on her acting career, including the lead role in the supernatural television show Ghost Whisperer. Her final record was the compilation album, Cool with You: The Platinum Collection, released in Asia in June 2006. In 2013, she recorded five songs for the television drama The Client List, in which she starred as the lead character. The same year, she collaborated with Sophie B. Hawkins for a song for the comedy film Alpha Males Experiment. In 2024, Hewitt released a cover of Kenny Rogers's and Dolly Parton's "Islands in the Stream" after it was featured on 9-1-1, a show in which she plays a lead role.

== Songs ==
Key
†	Indicates single release
‡	Indicates songs written or co-written by Jennifer Love Hewitt

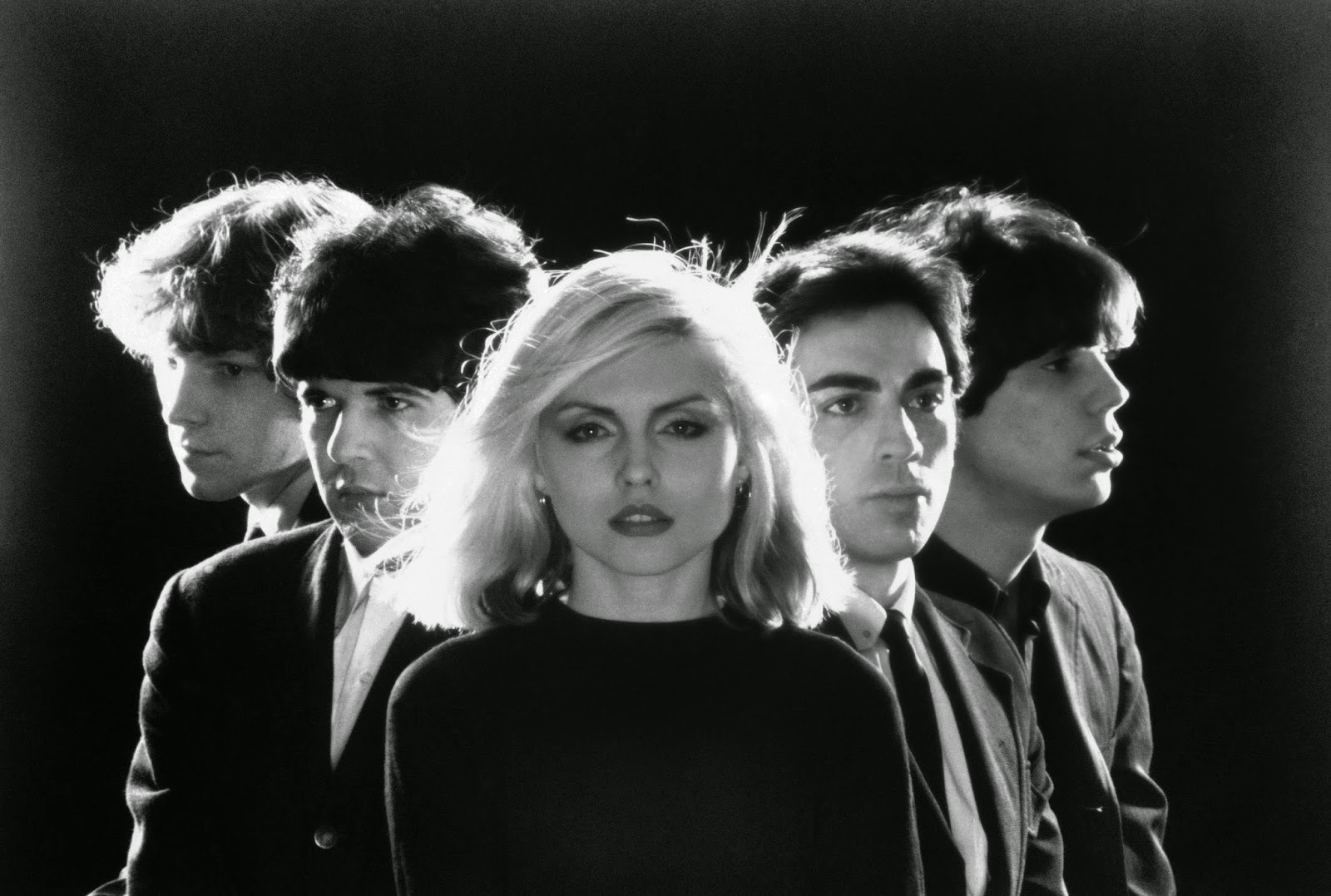
Hewitt recorded a cover of "Heart of Glass", originally performed by Blondie.

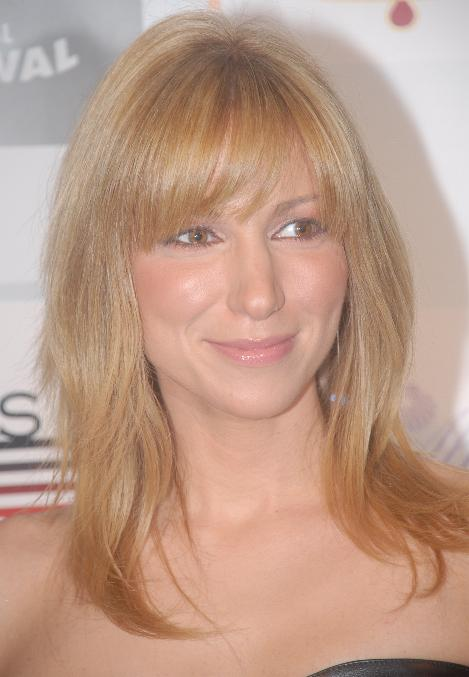
Deborah Gibson co-wrote a song for Hewitt's debut studio album.

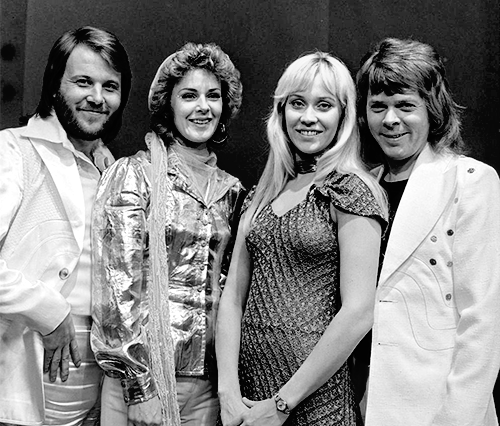
Hewitt recorded a cover of "Dancing Queen", originally performed by ABBA.

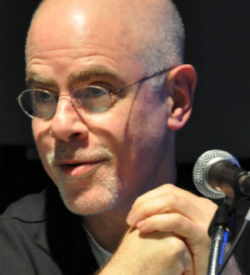
Wayne Cohen co-wrote several songs for Hewitt's second and third studio albums.

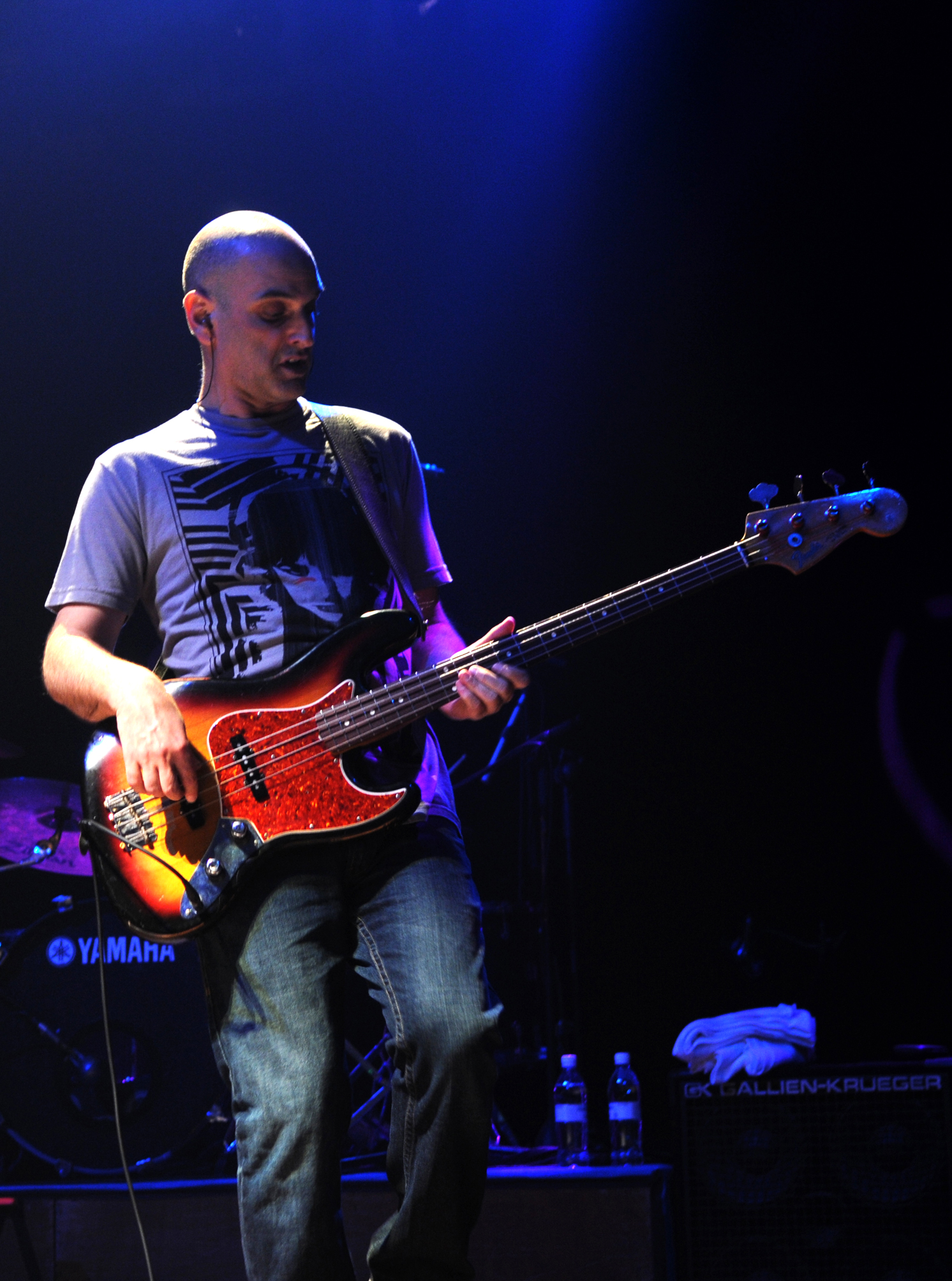
Guy Erez co-wrote two songs for Hewitt's album BareNaked.

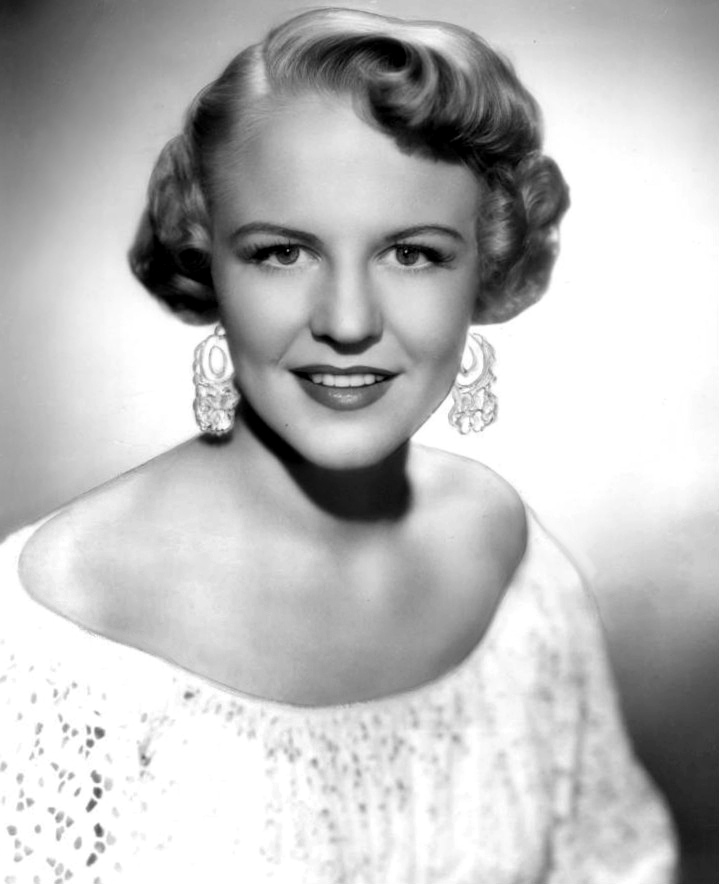
Hewitt recorded a cover of "I'm a Woman", originally performed by Peggy Lee, for the television show The Client List.

Name of song, writers, original release, and year of release
Song	Writer(s)	Release(s)	Year	Ref.
"90's Kids"	Ed Grenga; Gary McLaughlin; Jennifer Love Hewitt ‡	Love Songs	1992	
"Avenue of the Stars"	Jennifer Love Hewitt; Meredith Brooks; Andy Goldmark; Scot Sax ‡	BareNaked	2002	
"Baby I'm-a Want You"	David Gates	Let's Go Bang	1995	
"BareNaked" †	Jennifer Love Hewitt; Meredith Brooks; Guy Erez; Emerson Swinford ‡	BareNaked	2002	
"Bedtime Stories"	Robert Etoll; Deborah Gibson	Love Songs	1992	
"Ben"	Don Black; Walter Scharf	Love Songs	1992	
"Can I Go Now" †	Meredith Brooks; Livingstone Brown; Mike Stevens	BareNaked	2002	
"Can't Stand in the Way of Love"	Enid Levine; Wayne Cohen	Let's Go Bang	1995	
"Cool with You" †	Joleen Belle; Robert Palmer	Jennifer Love Hewitt	1996	
"Couldn't Find Another Man" †	Angelo Montrone	Let's Go Bang	1995	
"Dancing Queen" †	Benny Andersson; Björn Ulvaeus; Stig Anderson	Love Songs	1991	
"The Difference Between Us"	Camus Celli; Nicky Holland; Andres Levin	Let's Go Bang	1995	
"Don't Push the River"	Wayne Cohen; Billy Mann	Jennifer Love Hewitt	1996	
"Don't Turn Your Head Away"	Debbie Kaye; Angelo Montrone	Let's Go Bang	1995	
"Everywhere I Go"	Gerry Stober; Susan Pomerantz; Terrah Smith	Let's Go Bang	1995	
"First Taste of Love"	Porter Carroll; Robert Etoll; Jerry Stober	Love Songs	1992	
"First Time"	Meredith Brooks; Guy Erez; Paul Goldo; Emerson Swinford	BareNaked	2002	
"Free to Be a Woman"	Jennifer Love Hewitt; Angelo Montrone ‡	Let's Go Bang	1995	
"The Garden"	Angelo Montrone	Let's Go Bang	1995	
"The Greatest Word"	Wayne Cohen; Conner Reeves	Jennifer Love Hewitt	1996	
"Heart of Glass" †	Debbie Harry; Chris Stein	Non-album single	1990	
"Hey Everybody" †	Jennifer Love Hewitt; Meredith Brooks; Livingstone Brown ‡	BareNaked	2002	
"His Eye Is on the Sparrow"	Civilla D. Martin	The Client List	2013	
"How Do I Deal" †	Dillon O'Brian; Phil Roy; Bob Thiele	I Still Know What You Did Last Summer	1998	
"I Always Was Your Girl"	Tracey Thorn; Ben Watt	Jennifer Love Hewitt	1996	
"I Believe In..."	David Bryant; Fran Lucci; Dara Stewart	Jennifer Love Hewitt	1996	
"I Know You Will"	Jennifer Love Hewitt; Meredith Brooks; Dave Darling ‡	BareNaked	2002	
"I Want a Love I Can See"	Smokey Robinson	Jennifer Love Hewitt	1996	
"I'll Find You"	Robert Etoll	Love Songs	1992	
"I'm a Woman" †	Jerry Leiber and Mike Stoller	The Client List	2013	
"I'm Gonna Love You (Madellaine's Love Song)"	Jennifer Love Hewitt ‡	Disney's Superstar Hits	2002	
"In Another Life"	Andrew Gold; Greg Prestopino; Sam Lorber	Let's Go Bang	1995	
"It's Good to Know I'm Alive"	Dick Rudolph; Michael Sembello	Jennifer Love Hewitt	1996	
"Islands in the Stream" †	Barry Gibb; Robin Gibb; Maurice Gibb	Non-album single	2024	
"Just Try"	Meredith Brooks; Brian McKnight	BareNaked	2002	
"Kiss Away from Heaven"	Peter Bliss; Angelo Montrone	Let's Go Bang	1995	
"Last Night"	Wayne Cohen; Peter Zizzo	Jennifer Love Hewitt	1996	
"Let's Go Bang" †	Andy Goldmark; Bruce Roberts; George Lyter	Let's Go Bang	1995	
"Listen (To Your Heart)"	Austin Roberts; Robert Etoll	Love Songs	1992	
"A Little Jazz"	Danny Young; Melanie Andrews	Love Songs	1992	
"Me and Bobby McGee"	Kris Kristofferson; Fred Foster	BareNaked	2002	
"Never a Day Goes By" (Note: An acoustic version of "Never a Day Goes By" also appears on Jennifer Love Hewitt.)	Wayne Cohen	Jennifer Love Hewitt	1996	
"No Ordinary Love" †	Deborah Cox; Lascelles Stephens	Jennifer Love Hewitt	1996	
"One World" (featuring Earth, Wind & Fire)	P.P. Oland; F. Previte; Sergey Manukyan; M. Targo	Music Speaks Louder Than Words	1990	
"(Our Love) Don't Throw It All Away"	Barry Gibb; Blue Weaver	Jennifer Love Hewitt	1996	
"A Place Called Home"	Lynn Ahrens; Alan Menken	A Christmas Carol	2004	
"Please Save Us the World" †	Lance Cosgrove	Love Songs	1992	
"Rock the Roll"	Jennifer Love Hewitt; Meredith Brooks; Paul Goldo ‡	BareNaked	2002	
"Something to Talk About"	Shirley Eikhard	The Client List	2013	
"Stand in Your Way"	Meredith Brooks; Livingstone Brown; Shelly Peiken	BareNaked	2002	
"Stronger"	Jennifer Love Hewitt ‡	BareNaked	2002	
"What's It Gonna Take" †	Peter Margolis; Seth Mellman	Love Songs	1991	
"When I'm With You"	JJ Heller	The Client List	2013	
"When It Hurts" (featuring Sophie B. Hawkins)	Sophie B. Hawkins; Jennifer Love Hewitt ‡	Alpha Males Experiment	2013	
"When You Say Nothing at All"	Paul Overstreet; Don Schlitz	The Client List	2013	
"Where You Gonna Run To?"	Jennifer Love Hewitt; Meredith Brooks; Paul Goldo ‡	BareNaked	2002	
"Won't U B Mine"	Robert Etoll	Love Songs	1992	
"You Make Me Smile"	L. Desmond; Ren Toppano	Let's Go Bang	1995	
"You"	Jennifer Love Hewitt; Meredith Brooks ‡	BareNaked	2002	
