= Jennifer Love Hewitt discography =

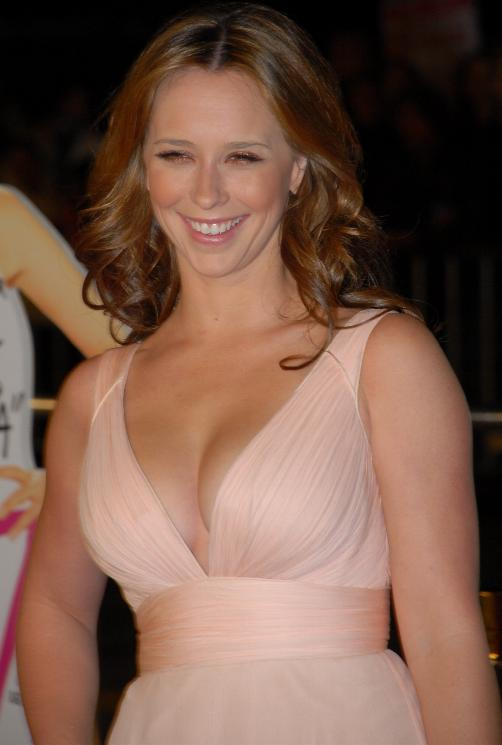
- Hewitt attending the premiere of 27 Dresses in Westwood, Los Angeles, January 2008
- Studio albums: 4
- Compilation albums: 1
- Singles: 14
- Music videos: 7
- Promotional singles: 5

American actress and singer Jennifer Love Hewitt has released four studio albums, a compilation album, seven music videos, and thirteen singles, as well as five promotional singles. Hewitt moved to Los Angeles at the age of 10 to pursue a music career; she instead rose to prominence as an actress in television commercials and on the children's television series Kids Incorporated. In 1990, Hewitt released a stand-alone cover of Blondie's "Heart of Glass" and appeared with Earth, Wind & Fire on a compilation album, Music Speaks Louder Than Words. While she continued to act, Hewitt signed a recording contract with video game company Meldac. She released her debut studio album, Love Songs, under the name "Love Hewitt" in March 1992; it included three singles: "Dancing Queen", "What's It Gonna Take", and "Please Save Us the World".

Hewitt received further attention in 1994 for her performance in the family drama Party of Five. During this success, she signed with Atlantic and released two studio albums: Let's Go Bang in September 1995 and a self-titled album in September 1996. To promote Let's Go Bang, the title track and "Couldn't Find Another Man" were marketed as singles. "Cool with You", "No Ordinary Love", and "I Believe In..." were released as singles from her self-titled album. Both albums were commercially unsuccessful, which resulted in Hewitt's being dropped from Atlantic; after this, she focused on her acting career.

Hewitt recorded the single "How Do I Deal" for the soundtrack of the 1998 slasher film I Still Know What You Did Last Summer, in which she had a starring role. The song reached number 59 on the Billboard Hot 100, as well as number 8 on the Australian songs chart and number 5 on the New Zealand songs chart. It received a gold certification from the Australian Recording Industry Association (ARIA) and is the best-selling song of her career.

In October 2002, Hewitt released her fourth studio album, BareNaked. It peaked at number 37 on the Billboard 200, number 31 on the Australian albums chart, number 75 on the German albums chart, and number 72 on the Dutch albums chart. Two singles were released from the album: "BareNaked" and "Can I Go Now"; both charted in the United States and internationally, and each received a gold certification from the ARIA. "Hey Everybody" was the only promotional single from the album. The same year, Hewitt recorded "I'm Gonna Love You (Madellaine's Love Song)" for the film The Hunchback of Notre Dame II, in which she also voiced the character Madellaine. She later contributed a song to the 2004 television film A Christmas Carol, an adaptation of the original novella by Charles Dickens; she also played a lead role in the film. Since 2004, Hewitt has shifted her attention to acting over music. In June 2006, the compilation album, Cool with You: The Platinum Collection, was released only in Asia as Hewitt's final record. She released five songs in 2013 in association with the television drama The Client List, in which she played the lead character. One of the tracks, "I'm a Woman", was promoted as a single with a music video. The same year, Hewitt collaborated with Sophie B. Hawkins on a song for the comedy film Alpha Males Experiment.

== Albums ==
=== Studio albums ===
List of studio albums, with selected chart positions
Title	Album details	Peak chart positions				
Title	Album details	US	AUS	GER	NL	Sales
Love Songs	Released: March 21, 1992; Label: Meldac (28003); Formats: CD, cassette	—	—	—	—	
Let's Go Bang	Released: October 10, 1995; Label: Atlantic (7567828192); Formats: CD, cassette, digital download	—	—	—	—	
Jennifer Love Hewitt	Released: September 3, 1996; Label: Atlantic (82934-2); Formats: CD, cassette, digital download	—	—	—	—	
BareNaked	Released: October 8, 2002; Label: Jive (01241-41821-2); Formats: CD, digital download	37	31	75	72	US: 101,000
"—" denotes releases that did not chart or were not released in that territory.

=== Compilation album ===
Title	Album details
Cool with You: The Platinum Collection	Released: June 6, 2006; Label: Warner Music (112917); Formats: CD

== Singles ==
=== As lead artist ===
List of singles, with selected chart positions and certifications
Title	Year	Peak chart positions								Certifications	Album
Title	Year	US	US Pop	AUS	BEL (FL)	GER	NZ	NL	SWI	Certifications	Album
"Heart of Glass"	1990	—	—	—	—	—	—	—	—		Non-album single
"Dancing Queen"	1991	—	—	—	—	—	—	—	—		Love Songs
"What's It Gonna Take"	1991	—	—	—	—	—	—	—	—		Love Songs
"Please Save Us the World"	1992	—	—	—	—	—	—	—	—		Love Songs
"Let's Go Bang"	1995	—	—	—	—	—	—	—	—		Let's Go Bang
"Couldn't Find Another Man"	1995	—	—	—	—	—	—	—	—		Let's Go Bang
"Cool with You"	1996	—	—	—	—	—	—	—	—		Jennifer Love Hewitt
"No Ordinary Love"	1996	—	—	—	—	—	—	—	—		Jennifer Love Hewitt
"I Believe In..."	1997	—	—	—	—	—	—	—	—		Jennifer Love Hewitt
"How Do I Deal"	1999	59	36	8	—	—	5	—	—	ARIA: Gold	I Still Know What You Did Last Summer
"BareNaked"	2002	— (Note: "BareNaked" did not enter the Billboard Hot 100, but it did peak on the Bubbling Under Hot 100 Singles chart at number 24.)	35	6	56	—	26	73	—	ARIA: Gold	BareNaked
"Can I Go Now"	2003	—	—	12	20	79	—	26	69	ARIA: Gold	BareNaked
"I'm a Woman"	2013	—	—	—	—	—	—	—	—		The Client List
"Islands in the Stream"	2024	—	—	—	—	—	—	—	—		Non-album single
"—" denotes releases that did not chart or were not released in that territory.

=== Promotional singles ===
Song	Year	Album
"Hey Everybody"	2002	BareNaked
"Something to Talk About"	2013	The Client List
"When I'm with You"	2013	The Client List
"His Eye Is on the Sparrow"	2013	The Client List
"When You Say Nothing at All"	2013	The Client List

== Other appearances ==
Title	Year	Other artist(s)	Album
"One World"	1990	Earth, Wind & Fire	Music Speaks Louder Than Words
"I'm Gonna Love You (Madellaine's Love Song)"	2002	None	Disney's Superstar Hits
"A Place Called Home"	2004	None	A Christmas Carol
"When It Hurts"	2013	Sophie B. Hawkins	Alpha Males Experiment

== Music videos ==
Title	Year	Director(s)
"Heart of Glass"	1990	Unknown
"Please Save Us the World"	1992	Unknown
"Couldn't Find Another Man"	1995	Nigel Dick
"How Do I Deal"	1998	Joseph Kahn
"BareNaked"	2002	Liz Friedlander
"Can I Go Now"	2003	Liz Friedlander
"Big Spender"	2012	Unknown
"I'm a Woman"	2013	Matthew Rolston
"Islands in the Stream"	2024	Unknown
