= Thousand Hours =

- Born: Paul Mansford
- Origin: London, United Kingdom
- Genres: Electronic, blue-eyed soul
- Occupations: Singer, instrumentalist, songwriter
- Instruments: Vocals, keyboard
- Years active: 2012-present
- Website: www.thousandhoursmusic.com

Thousand Hours is a London, UK-based electromantic blue-eyed soul music project featuring Paul Mansford. Mansford is a singer, instrumentalist and songwriter whose performances employ live and looped vocals/EDM, beats/synths, and ambient Nord keyboard stylings.

== Influences ==
Thousand Hours' music has elements in common with artists such as James Blake, Daft Punk, Calvin Harris, SBTRKT, M83, Sam Sparro, Example and Allen Stone.

== History ==
Mansford previously performed as frontman and lead vocalist for Total Movement, a London-based electropop project with his twin brother Alan (bass and vocals), Joe Dickenson (guitar and samples), and Will Calver (drums and triggers). Their single "Show Them What You’re Made Of" (2010) was signed to German Clubland label Sound of Now, and their EP releases include Halo (2008) and Grace (2009).

Thousand Hours' executive producer is New York City- and London-based multi-platinum songwriter Wayne Cohen (European Pop Idol, Eternal, Jennifer Love Hewitt, Curtis Stigers, Martin Sexton, Laura and the Tears). The two met through a mutual friend with whom Cohen was co-writing. Cohen and Mansford eventually began collaborating, working on songs and recordings via Skype. From there, Thousand Hours – initially a one-man band featuring looped beats, vocals, and synths – was born. Out of Mansford and Cohen's different interpretations of the project came a style of "electromantic" music. NPR contributor Stephanie Coleman deemed the term electromantic as "having no meaning and every meaning. It's a buzz word - people will make their own associations to the word electromantic."

== Discography ==
Thousand Hours' debut album, Dark & Light, was released on 22 March 2013. All vocals by Paul Mansford and his loop pedal (London, UK) | Produced and mixed by Wayne Cohen (NYC) | Assistant Produced and Mixed by Max Graham | Some programming by Henry Steinway | Live keyboards by Paul | Recorded at Paul's house (London) and Stand Up Sound] (NYC) | Mixed at Stand Up Sound (NYC)

== Performances ==
Thousand Hours has performed at London venues such as The Regal Room and The Bedford. Thousand Hours' New York City debut in June 2013 included shows at Rockwood Music Hall, The Bowery Electric, The Bitter End, and ZirZamin, and as a featured performer at Sync Summit, a music industry showcase which took place at SoHo House in New York City.
