= Barenaked =

Barenaked may refer to:

- Barenaked Ladies, Canadian rock band which sometimes uses the adjective in associated projects such as Barenaked for the Holidays
- BareNaked, an album by Jennifer Love Hewitt
  - BareNaked (song), a song from the album
