= Uchuu =

Uchuu may refer to:

- Uchuu Keiji Gavan (Space Sheriff Gavan), the first of the Metal Heroes TV series broadcast 1982–1983
- Uchuu Keiji Shaider (Space Sheriff Shaider), the third of the Metal Heroes series
- Uchuu Keiji Sharivan (Space Sheriff Sharivan), the second of the Metal Heroes series
- Super Space Sheriff Gavan Infinity, the first of the Project Red TV Series in 2026 (Metal Heroes Revival Series)
- Uchuu no kishi Tekkaman Blade Space Knights, the second soundtrack album for the anime series, Tekkaman Blade
- Uchuu Race: Astro Go! Go!, racing game for the Super Famicom system, exclusive to Japan
- Uchuu simulations A large and realistic simulation of the Universe created using ATERUI II, the world's most powerful supercomputer dedicated to astronomy
- Uchuu, Palau, a bar in Palau
