= Black Butterfly =

Black Butterfly may refer to:

== Film ==
- Black Butterfly (1968 film), a Hong Kong film directed by Lo Wei
- Black Butterfly (2006 film), a Peruvian film directed by Francisco Lombardi
- Black Butterfly (2013 film), 2013 Indian film directed by Rajaputra Ranjith
- Black Butterfly (2017 film), an American film directed by Brian Goodman

== Music ==
- Black Butterfly (Dana Dawson album) 1995
- Black Butterfly (Tsakani Mhinga album) 2003
- Black Butterfly (Buckcherry album), a 2008 album by American hard rock band Buckcherry
- "Black Butterfly" (song), a 1984 song by American singer-songwriter Deniece Williams

== Other ==
- Psychedelica of the Black Butterfly, a 2015 video game
- Black Butterfly (novel), a 2008 novel by Mark Gatiss
