= Earthbound (Conner Reeves album) =

1997 debut album by Conner Reeves

Studio album by Conner Reeves
- Released: 24 November 1997
- Studios: Jacobs Studios (Farnham); Abbey Road (London)
- Labels: Wildstar; CDWILD3
- Producer: Grant Mitchell

Conner Reeves chronology
| Earthbound (1997) | Welcome to the Future (2006) |

Singles from Earthbound
- 1. "My Father's Son" Released: 18 August 1997; 2. "Earthbound" Released: 10 November 1997; 3. "Read My Mind" Released: 30 March 1998

Earthbound is the debut album by English singer and songwriter Conner Reeves, released on 24 November 1997. Three singles came from the album—"My Father's Son", "Earthbound" and "Read My Mind"—all of which reached the top 20 of the UK singles chart. Earthbound reached number 25 in the UK Albums Chart, staying on the chart for 11 weeks.

== Critical reception ==
Professional ratings
Review scores
| Source | Rating |
|---|---|
| AllMusic | 3/5 stars |
| Smash Hits | 4/5 stars |

Andy Gill of The Independent wrote on 28 November 1997:

Earthbound presents a blue-eyed soul singer of remarkable abilities, not least of which is a gift for writing songs which, like the closing track, "Ordinary People", already sound like standards. Reeves and his producer Grant Mitchell are intimately familiar with every wrinkle of their genre, turning their hands with equal facility to swingbeat, mild funk, gospel pleading and political soul.

== Track listing ==
| No. | Title | Writer(s) | Length |
|---|---|---|---|
| 1. | "They Say" | Conner Reeves | 4:30 |
| 2. | "My Father's Son" | Reeves; Graham Lyle | 4:06 |
| 3. | "Read My Mind" | Reeves; Wayne Cohen | 4:18 |
| 4. | "We Are the Wave" | Reeves; Marc Hall | 4:49 |
| 5. | "Nobody but You" | Reeves; Lyle; Terry Britten | 5:00 |
| 6. | "Earthbound" | Reeves; Lyle | 4:28 |
| 7. | "We Were Only Dancing" | Reeves; Grant Mitchell | 4:54 |
| 8. | "Let It Breathe" | Reeves | 4:02 |
| 9. | "Working Man" | Reeves; Hall | 4:19 |
| 10. | "Ordinary People" | Reeves | 4:56 |

== Personnel ==
Adapted from the album's liner notes.

Musicians

- Conner Reeves – vocals (all tracks)
- Adam Drake – guitar (tracks 1–7, 9)
- Henry Jackman – drum programming (tracks 4–7)
- Manu Katché – drums (track 9)
- Keeling Lee – guitar
- London Session Orchestra; led by Gavyn Wright, conducted by James Shearman (tracks 4, 6, 10)
- Graham Lyle – guitar (track 2)
- Dominic Miller – guitar (tracks 6, 9)
- Grant Mitchell – keyboards (all tracks), piano (track 10), organ (track 9), Rhodes piano (track 9), drum programming (tracks 2, 7), strings arrangement (tracks 6, 10)
- Pino Palladino – bass guitar (tracks 2, 6, 9)
- Ren Swan – percussion (track 6)

Technical

- Grant Mitchell – producer (all tracks), programming (all tracks)
- Ren Swan – recording (all tracks), mixing (tracks 1, 4–10)
- Steve Fitzmaurice – mixing (track 2)
- Ian Green – mixing (track 3)
- Tony Matthew, Damon Iddins, Carl Pritchard, Alex Black – recording assistants
- Recorded at Jacobs Studios (Farnham, England), mixed at Astoria (London) & Sarm West (London)
- Strings recorded at Abbey Road (London)
- Loren Haynes – photography
- Intro, London – design

== Charts ==
Chart performance for Earthbound
| Chart (1997) | Peak position |
|---|---|
| UK Albums (Official Charts) | 25 |
| UK R&B Albums (Official Charts) | 5 |

== Certifications ==
| Region | Certification | Certified units/sales |
|---|---|---|
| United Kingdom (BPI) | Gold | 100,000^{^} |
^{^} Shipments figures based on certification alone.
