= Wayne Cohen =

American songwriter

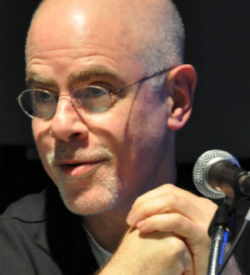
- Wayne Cohen

Background information
- Born: Wayne Jordan Cohen; New York City, US
- Genres: Pop
- Occupation(s): Songwriter, composer, producer, artist developer, advertising music creative director, music educator
- Instrument(s): bass, piano, guitar, voice, keyboards, programming
- Website: waynecohensongs.com

Wayne Cohen is an American songwriter, producer, artist developer and music educator whose songs include Top 10 hit singles and #1 albums, which have sold more than 5 million, in the US, UK, Europe, Australia/New Zealand and Asia. He works from his NYC studio Stand Up Sound, as well as in London and Los Angeles.

== Discography ==
Song	Artist	Release	Label	Notability	Credits	Year
Not Anonymous	Jamie Lee Harrison	Not Anonymous (single)	Jamie Lee Harrison - UK		writer, producer	2022
True To You (Do Do Do)	Jamie Lee Harrison	True To You (Do Do Do) (single)	Jamie Lee Harrison - UK		writer, producer	2022
The Way (Go Go Go)	Jamie Lee Harrison	The Way (Go Go Go) (single)	Jamie Lee Harrison - UK		writer, producer	2021
Dream Enough	Sitti	album: Sitti: Sessions	Warner Music Philippines, Rhino Records USA		writer	2012 (PHL) 2013 (US)
Firelight	Thousand Hours	album: Dark & Light	Stand Up Sound		writer, producer	2013
Aligned	Thousand Hours	album: Dark & Light	Stand Up Sound		writer, producer	2013
Light Me Up	Thousand Hours	album: Dark & Light	Stand Up Sound		writer, producer	2013
Detonate	Thousand Hours	album: Dark & Light	Stand Up Sound		writer, producer	2013
Some Kind of Beauty	Thousand Hours	album: Dark & Light	Stand Up Sound		writer, producer	2013
Are You Willing	Rachelle Spector	album: Out of My Chelle	Genius 4ever Records	Produced by Phil Spector	writer	2010
Love Live On	Laura and the Tears	album: Love Live On! - EP	Smack	single: BBC Radio 2 playlist	writer, producer	2009
Special	Boris	album: Rely On Me	BMG	#1 Album	writer	2005
Never A Day Goes By	Alsou	album: Alsou	Universal		writer	2002
Rewind	Precious	album: Precious, four CD compilations, single	EMI	single: #11 on UK Charts	writer	2000
Love Keep Us Together	Martin Sexton	album: The American, two CD compilations	Atlantic		writer	1998
Nowhere and Everywhere	Michelle Lewis	album: Practical Magic soundtrack	Warner	Certified gold,	writer	1998
Nowhere and Everywhere	Michelle Lewis	album: Little Leviathan	Warner	first single on album	writer	1998
Read My Mind	Conner Reeves	album: Earthbound, compilation CD	Wildstar	single: #19 on UK Charts	writer	1998
Catch up to Your Heart	Eric Bibb	album: Me To You	Code Blue		writer, producer	1998
Between a Woman and a Man	Eric Bibb	album: Me To You	Code Blue		writer	1998
Nothin' Like You Used To Do	Eric Bibb	album: Good Stuff	EarthBeat!		writer	1998
24 Hour Love	Robin S.	album: From Now On	Atlantic		writer	1997
Love Keep Us Together	Martin Sexton	album: Black Sheep	Kitchen Table Records		writer	1996
Caught in the Rain	Martin Sexton	album: Black Sheep	Kitchen Table Records		writer	1996
Never A Day Goes By	Jennifer Love Hewitt	album: Jennifer Love Hewitt	Atlantic		writer, producer	1996
Don't Push The River	Jennifer Love Hewitt	album: Jennifer Love Hewitt	Atlantic		writer, producer	1996
Last Night	Jennifer Love Hewitt	album: Jennifer Love Hewitt	Atlantic		writer, producer	1996
The Greatest World	Jennifer Love Hewitt	album: Jennifer Love Hewitt	Atlantic		writer, producer	1996
How I Wanna Be Loved	Dana Dawson	album: Black Butterfly	EMI	single	writer	1996
Can't Stand in the Way of Love	Jennifer Love Hewitt	album: Let's Go Bang	Atlantic		writer	1995
Just a Step From Heaven	Eternal	album: Always & Forever	EMI	single: #8 on UK Charts, multi-territory hit single	writer	1993
Sleeping With the Lights On	Curtis Stigers	album: Curtis Stigers	Arista	UK Albums peak position 7, hit single	writer	1991
The Man You're Gonna Fall in Love With	Curtis Stigers	album: Curtis Stigers	Arista	UK Albums peak position 7	writer	1991
Count My Blessings	Curtis Stigers	album: Curtis Stigers	Arista	UK Albums peak position 7	writer	1991
The Last Time I Said Goodbye	Curtis Stigers	album: Curtis Stigers	Arista	UK Albums peak position 7	writer	1991
Nobody Loves You Like I Do	Curtis Stigers	album: Curtis Stigers	Arista	UK Albums peak position 7	writer	1991

Song	Film/TV Placement	Credits	Year
Need You Deep	City Girl Diaries - Style Network TV show	writer, producer	2013
Instrumental Library	Cover Shot - TLC cable TV show	writer, producer	2008
A Girl's Gotta Do (What A Girl's Gotta Do)	Summerland - WB TV	writer, producer	2007
Score and songs	The Sound - indie feature film by Roger Majkowski	writer, producer, music supervisor	2005
No More Next Time (performed by Kit Hain)	The Young and the Restless - daytime soap	writer, producer	2001
Not the One (performed by Michelle Lewis)	Jack and Jill - WB TV series	writer, producer	2000
Nowhere and Everywhere (Performed by Michelle Lewis)	Practical Magic - WB feature film	writer	1998

== Artist Developer ==
In addition to his many released songs, Wayne is known within the music industry to have made significant contributions to the development of the careers of multi-million selling Clive Davis-signed blue-eyed soul artist Curtis Stigers, singer/songwriter Martin Sexton, singer/songwriter Michelle Lewis, Australian indie pop/rock artist Dimitra, UK artists Thousand Hours, Laura Welsh (Laura and the Tears) and US artist Karen Kanan.

== Business Ventures ==
Wayne owns Stand Up Sound/Stand Up Songs/Wayne’s World (ASCAP), a NYC-based music and audio production company, recording studio (see citation), and independent music publishing company. His company runs a robust internship program, which has hosted many student interns from the US and the UK. He also has co-publishing ventures with Sony Music Publishing.

== Educator ==
In addition to his three decades of real-world experience, Wayne has taught Melody Writing, Lyric Writing, Music Production and Music Marketing at university-level institutions including the State University of NY at Purchase College, New York University (the Clive Davis Institute of Recorded Music, Tisch and Steinhardt divisions) and at Berklee College of Music. He has also developed a song tutoring (see citation) course that benefits songwriters around the world, in person, and via Skype.

== Early life ==
Before becoming a songwriter, Wayne was a music creative director, composer and producer for visual media. He started his career at age 21 as the youngest music and radio producer in the history of ad agency Young & Rubicam, followed by a long stint with major NYC based advertising music production company HEA Productions. His advertising accomplishments include composing and producing music and audio for international television/radio ad campaigns for advertisers including Coca-Cola, Burger King, Amtrak, U.S. Army, and Dr. Pepper. Prior to his work in advertising Wayne earned his Independent Learning - jazz studies B.A. from Indiana University, and performed across the US and in the UK in jazz and rock bands.
