= Zombie Nation (video game) =

1990 video game

- Cover art for the North American release for the NES
- Developer: KAZe
- Publishers: Meldac / Liveplanning (NES); City Connection (Nintendo Switch and Microsoft Windows)
- Director: Norio Nakagata
- Producers: Sueo Sekizawa (executive producer); Junichiro Kawazoe
- Designer: Takane Ōkubo
- Programmer: Kunihiro Hiramatsu
- Artists: Shin-ichi Ogawa; Takao Yoshiba
- Composers: Takane Ohkubo; Norio Nakagata
- Platforms: Nintendo Entertainment System, Microsoft Windows, Nintendo Switch
- Release: Nintendo Entertainment System: JP: December 14, 1990; NA: January 1991; Nintendo Switch and Microsoft Windows: JP: October 28, 2021
- Genre: Shoot 'em up
- Mode: Single-player

Zombie Nation (Note: Known also as Samurai Zombie Nation) is a 1990 shoot 'em up game developed by KAZe and published by Meldac.

== Gameplay ==
Depending on the version of the game, the player controls the giant levitating disembodied samurai head Namakubi (生首, namakubi; lit. "severed head") or a giant Tengu mask. The player can destroy structures and enemies by shooting rapid-fire eyeballs and vomit at them. Enemies include zombie snipers, zeppelins and lava monsters. The player can upgrade their firepower by rescuing zombie hostages that leap out of structures when destroyed.

The player starts every level with a full life bar of eight units (displayed as mini Namakubi heads at the bottom of the screen), and as the player gets hit, the life bar decreases. When it is down to one bar remaining, the music changes to a dramatic theme. The game ends when the player loses all eight units of the life bar or is crushed by the scrolling of the screen. However, the player can regenerate some of their life by defeating enemies and structures. In addition, the player gets six (increasing by one for every stage section completed, up to a maximum of nine) continues to beat the game.

Zombie Nation features two difficulty levels, easy and hard. The game also allows the player, like in the Mega Man series, to select any stage at will. Once a stage is selected the following stages will be played sequentially cycling from stage 4 back to 1. The objective is to clear all four stages and then destroy the final boss, Darc Seed.

== Story ==
The head of the samurai Namakubi hears of Shura falling into Darc Seed's clutches. He then heads to the United States to destroy Darc Seed, free the American people from the looming zombification and reclaim the samurai sword Shura.

== Regional differences ==
Screenshot of Abarenbō Tengu

The game was first released in Japan under the name Abarenbou Tengu on December 14, 1990. The US version was released a month later. As both versions only have differences between the sprites, with the Japanese version having a tengu mask belonging to Japanese folklore, the US version has major graphical and story changes, replacing the tengu mask with the decapitated samurai head.

== Reception ==
Initial and retrospective reviews

Review scores
Publication	Score
Dragon	2.5/5
GamePro	4.6/5 (Note: GamePro gave Zombie Nation three 5/5 ratings for graphics, fun factor, and challenge and two 4/5 scores for sound and gameplay.)
Nintendo Power	3.15 (Note: Nintendo Power awarded Zombie Nation a 3.6/5 for graphics/sound, 3.3 for play control, 2.8/5 for challenge, and 2.9/5 for theme/fun.)

The St. Petersburg Times tied the game with Splatterhouse 2 as the tenth-best video game of 1992. Mashable, in ranking Zombie Nation the second-weirdest video game of all time, claimed it "brings the side-scrolling shooter genre to a weird and gross new height. As challenging as it is confusing, the high point of this game is the chance to take down an animated, evil Statue of Liberty."

== Other media ==
In August 2020, City Connection announced a re-release of the game under the name Abarenbou Tengu & Zombie Nation (暴れん坊天狗 & ZOMBIE NATION, Abarenbō Tengu & ZOMBIE NATION). The game was released on both the Nintendo Switch and Microsoft Windows platforms on October 28, 2021.
