= Super Pinball: Behind the Mask =

1994 video game

- North American cover art
- Developer: KAZe
- Publishers: NA/EU: Nintendo; JP: Meldac
- Designer: Takashi Kobayashi
- Composer: Yusuke Takahama
- Platform: Super NES
- Release: JP: January 8, 1994; NA: May 1994; EU: August 8, 1994
- Genre: Pinball
- Modes: Single-player, multiplayer

Super Pinball: Behind the Mask is a pinball video game for the Super Nintendo Entertainment System that was released in 1994 in North America and Japan.

== Gameplay ==
The game has three tables: "Blackbeard and Ironmen", "Jolly Joker", and "Wizard". The game can be played in competition mode where up to 4 players compete for the highest score, or in conquest mode where a single player attempts to beat score objectives on all three playfields.

== Reception ==
Reception

Aggregate score
Aggregator	Score
GameRankings	65% (2 reviews)

Review scores
Publication	Score
Electronic Gaming Monthly	6.4/10
GamePro	14.5/20

GamePro criticized the game for emulating early pinball machines, which were "straightforward and not very imaginative", rather than modern pinball video games. They elaborated that "The bumpers, flippers, and bonus markers are too small, and the angle of the board will give you a permanent squint." Electronic Gaming Monthly remarked that it "is probably the best looking home pinball game out there, but that's about it. The game play gets very repetitious and boring ..." Nintendo Power found the 3-D view of the machine on a single screen to be unusual, but praised the look, feel, and sound of the game.
