= Romantic World =

1991 single by Dana Dawson

Single by Dana Dawson

from the album Paris New York and Me
- B-side: "Everytime"
- Released: December 1990
- Recorded: 1990
- Genre: Pop
- Length: 4:10
- Label: CBS
- Songwriters: Romano Musumarra, Porter Carroll
- Producer: Romano Musumarra

Dana Dawson singles chronology
"Ready to Follow You" (1988)	"Romantic World" (1990)	"Tell Me Bonita" (1991)

"Romantic World" is a 1990 song recorded by American singer Dana Dawson. Written by Romano Musumarra and Porter Carroll, it was released in December 1990 as the lead single from the album Paris New York and Me, on which it appears as the first track. It was very successful in France, becoming Dawson's first top five in France and her biggest hit in the country.

In France, "Romantic World" debuted at number 43 on the chart edition of 22 December 1990, but fell of the top 50 two weeks later. Then it re-entered the chart at number 45 and climbed quickly, reaching a peak of number four in its 13th week of presence. It totalled 15 weeks in the top ten and fell off the top 50 after 26 weeks. It achieved Gold status, awarded by the Syndicat National de l'Édition Phonographique, the French certificator, for over 400,000 units sold. It achieved a minor success in Sweden and Belgium (Flanders) where it charted for two and three weeks respectively, and peaked at number 33, and was a commercial failure in Australia where it failed to reach the top 100. On the European Hot 100, it debuted at number 98 on 9 February 1991, peaked at number 21 in its ninth week and remained in the top 100 for 19 weeks.

In 1993, South African singer Brenda Fassie covered the song on her album I Am Not A Bad Girl.

== Track listings ==
CD single

1. "Romantic World" — 4:10
2. "Everytime" — 4:42

CD maxi

1. "Romantic World" — 4:10
2. "Romantic World" (alo alo mix) — 5:03
3. "Everytime" — 4:44

7" single

1. "Romantic World" — 4:10
2. "Everytime" — 4:42

12" maxi - Europe

1. "Romantic World" — 5:50
2. "Romantic World" (instrumental version) — 4:10
3. "Everytime" — 4:42

12" maxi - Australia

1. "Romantic World" — 4:45
2. "Romantic World" (instrumental version) — 4:43
3. "Romantic World" (extended version) — 5:50

== Charts and sales ==
=== Weekly charts ===
Chart (1990–1991)	Peak position
Australia (ARIA)	113
Belgium (Ultratop 50 Flanders)	33
Europe (Eurochart Hot 100)	21
France (SNEP)	4
Sweden (Sverigetopplistan)	33

=== Year-end charts ===
Chart (1991)	Position
Europe (Eurochart Hot 100)	91

=== Certifications ===
Certifications for "Romantic World"
Region	Certification	Certified units/sales
France (SNEP)	Gold	400,000^{*}
^{*} Sales figures based on certification alone.

== Release history ==
Country	Date	Format	Label
Spain	1990	Promotional 7" single	CBS
Europe	1990	CD single	CBS
Europe	1990	CD maxi	CBS
Europe	1990	7" single	CBS
Europe	1990	12" maxi	CBS
Australia	1990	12" maxi	Columbia
