= WordZap =

1991 video game

Word Zap
- Game Boy cover art
- Developers: Realtime Associates (Game Boy version), MICA
- Publisher: Jaleco Entertainment (Game Boy version)
- Designer: Michael F.C. Crick
- Composer: George Sanger (Game Boy)
- Platforms: Microsoft Windows, Game Boy
- Release: Microsoft Windows: 1991; Game Boy: NA: September 1992
- Genre: Puzzle
- Modes: Single-player; Multiplayer

WordZap is a puzzle video game designed by Michael F.C. Crick, son of scientist Francis Crick. In 1991, it was included with Volume 3 of the Microsoft Entertainment Pack and was later released by Jaleco for the Game Boy in 1992. An updated version for newer editions of Microsoft Windows is available on the game's official website as shareware. The game has been compared with Scrabble and Boggle; in WordZap, players race to make proper English words to fill their rack of words, but when one player makes a word already found by the other player, the word is "zapped" from both players' racks. Each round ends when either one player fills the word rack, or time runs out without either player being able to make another word.

== Gameplay ==
Players must form words using the supplied tiles (Windows version).

In the Game Boy version, players can choose between 3-, 4-, or 5-letter words. They can also enable or disable hints, allow or disallow plural forms of words and even choose the level of vocabulary used in the game. Each round has a different theme attached to it (e.g., "Any Letter"). Players have a limited time to solve each round before it ends. They also have a choice between the conventional "WordZap" mode and the "WordHai" mode, which permits players to create 3-letter words from a set of 21 tiles. Removing a tile from the screen requires using it; opening up options for building new words.

There is a built-in dictionary using a complete list of ten thousand English-language words. Two players can compete against other using a Game Link. Only the "WordZap" mode is available for two-player play. All types of skill levels are accommodated in this game from novice players to experts.

== Development ==
The game was originally picked up by Meldac as WordHai at the 1991 Summer Consumer Electronics Show, but Meldac of America went into bankruptcy before the game ever went into release, and it was picked up by Jaleco where it was released as WordZap.

== Reception ==
GamePro wrote: "WordZap is guaranteed to satisfy the bored traveler, or wannabe vocabulary whizz."
