= I Wonder Why (Curtis Stigers song) =

1991 single by Curtis Stigers

Single by Curtis Stigers

from the album Curtis Stigers
- B-side: "Nobody Loves You Like I Do"
- Released: August 12, 1991
- Genre: Jazz; soft rock
- Length: 4:19
- Label: Arista
- Songwriters: Curtis Stigers; Glen Ballard
- Producer: Glen Ballard

Curtis Stigers singles chronology
"I Wonder Why" (1991)	"You're All That Matters to Me" (1992)

"I Wonder Why" is a song by American singer and songwriter Curtis Stigers, released on August 12, 1991 in the United States by Arista Records as the first single from his eponymous debut album (1991). The song is written by Stigers with Glen Ballard, who also produced it. It reached number four on the Danish and Irish singles charts, number five on the UK Singles Chart, and number nine on the US Billboard Hot 100. The single also reached the top 10 in Belgium, Denmark, Germany, the Netherlands, and Norway.

== Track listings ==
- 7-inch single and US cassette single
1. "I Wonder Why"
2. "Nobody Loves You Like I Do"
- Australian CD single
1. "I Wonder Why"
2. "Nobody Loves You Like I Do"
3. "The Man You're Gonna Fall in Love With"

== Charts ==
=== Weekly charts ===
Chart (1991–1992)	Peak position
Australia (ARIA)	43
Belgium (Ultratop 50 Flanders)	4
Canada Top Singles (RPM)	14
Canada Adult Contemporary (RPM)	2
Denmark (IFPI)	4
Europe (Eurochart Hot 100)	18
Germany (GfK)	8
Ireland (IRMA)	4
Netherlands (Dutch Top 40)	7
Netherlands (Single Top 100)	11
Norway (VG-lista)	9
Sweden (Sverigetopplistan)	25
UK Singles (Official Charts)	5
UK Airplay (Music Week)	1
US Billboard Hot 100	9
US Adult Contemporary (Billboard)	5
US Cash Box Top 100	9

=== Year-end charts ===
Chart (1991)	Position
Canada Adult Contemporary (RPM)	63

Chart (1992)	Position
Belgium (Ultratop)	56
Canada Adult Contemporary (RPM)	91
Europe (Eurochart Hot 100)	88
Germany (Media Control)	53
Netherlands (Dutch Top 40)	73
Netherlands (Single Top 100)	90
UK Singles (OCC)	38
UK Airplay (Music Week)	21
US Adult Contemporary (Billboard)	42

== Release history ==
Region	Date	Format(s)	Label(s)	Ref.
United States	August 12, 1991	Cassette	Arista	
Australia	December 16, 1991	CD; cassette	Arista	
United Kingdom	January 6, 1992	7-inch vinyl; CD; cassette	Arista	
Japan	January 21, 1992	Mini-CD	Arista	
Australia	September 21, 1992	CD; cassette (I Wonder Why EP)	Arista	
