= 3 Is Family =

1995 single by Dana Dawson

Single by Dana Dawson

from the album Black Butterfly
- B-side: "Freedom Calling"; "The Miracle of Your Love"
- Released: June 26, 1995
- Genre: Pop dance
- Length: 3:40
- Label: EMI United Kingdom; 1st Avenue
- Songwriter: Billy Mann
- Producer: Ric Wake

Dana Dawson singles chronology
| "Moving On" (1992) | "3 Is Family" (1995) | "Got to Give Me Love" (1995) |

Audio
- "3 Is Family" on YouTube

"3 Is Family" is the first single released from American singer Dana Dawson's second and final studio album, Black Butterfly (1995). The song was written by Billy Mann and produced by Ric Wake. In several territories, including the United Kingdom, it was released as her debut single on June 26, 1995, by EMI and 1st Avenue Records. It was not released in the United States.

The track was positively received by music critics and became a big radio hit in Europe, charting within the top 10 on the singles charts of Italy and the United Kingdom. On the European Hit Radio year-end chart for 1995, it was ranked at number 36. The song's success resulted in the follow-up single, "Got to Give Me Love", having its release date pushed back to October 1995.

== Critical reception ==
James Masterton described the song as "bright" and "an almost classic bit of summer pop" in his weekly UK chart commentary, noting that Dawson's voice sounded like Australian singer Kylie Minogue's. A reviewer from Music & Media wrote, "Coming from First Avenue in Hitsville, UK again, a hit is born almost per definition. Positioning her, she's the missing link between production stable mates Eternal and Dina Carroll." British magazine Music Week rated it four out of five, adding, "Yankee Dana is big in Europe, and must be fancied to make her UK breakthrough with this. The radio edit is concise and catchy, while mixes by T-Empo and Dancing Divaz have pushed it to the top of the club chart."

James Hamilton from the Record Mirror Dance Update declared it as a "Janet Jackson-ishly gurgled and cooed anxious jiggler". Gina Morris from Smash Hits gave it three out of five, writing, "Soulful and life-affirming, '3 Is Family' is the perfect afternoon-in-the-park-having-your-sarnies-nicked-by-pigeons pop song. The next Dina Carroll or Michelle Gayle no less." Peter Larsen of Danish radio station VLR said of the song, "It's simply a great pop song, which fully serves its purpose to make the people feel happy," while Sandra Boussu of Belgian radio station Hit-FM 106.1 described it as "summery" and "cheerful".

== Chart performance ==
Despite becoming a European radio hit, ending 1995 as European Hit Radio's 36th-most-successful hit, the song appeared on the official singles charts of only a few countries. On the Eurochart Hot 100, the single reached number 28. In the United Kingdom, it debuted at number 19 on July 9, 1995, then peaked at number nine two weeks later, spending a total of eight weeks in the top 100. On Music Week's RM Club Chart, it reached number one on June 17, 1995. The song charted for a single week in Iceland, debuting and peaking at number 37 on the Íslenski Listinn Topp 40 on the issue of August 26, 1995. "3 Is Family" spent 11 weeks on the German Singles Chart, climbing to number 59 on September 25. The same month, it debuted at number five in Italy, its peak. Outside Europe, the song managed to chart in Israel and Australia, where it peaked at numbers 19 and 54, respectively.

== Track listings ==
- UK and Australian CD single
1. "3 Is Family"
2. "Freedom Calling"
3. "The Miracle of Your Love"
4. "3 Is Family" (T-Empo radio mix)
- UK 12-inch single

A1. "3 Is Family" (T-Empo club mix)
A2. "3 Is Family" (T-Empo dub)
A3. "3 Is Family" (D.A.R.C. hip hop mix)
B1. "3 Is Family" (Dancing Divas club mix)
B2. "3 Is Family" (Dancing Divas dub mix)
B3. "3 Is Family" (D.A.R.C. R&B mix)

- UK cassette single and European CD single
1. "3 Is Family"
2. "Freedom Calling"
- Japanese CD single
1. "3 Is Family" (radio version)
2. "3 Is Family" (D.A.R.C. R&B mix)
3. "3 Is Family" (D.A.R.C. hip hop mix)
4. "3 Is Family" (D.A.R.C. salsa mix)
5. "3 Is Family" (T-Empo radio edit)
6. "3 Is Family" (Dancing Divas club mix)

== Charts ==
=== Weekly charts ===
| Chart (1995) | Peak position |
|---|---|
| Australia (ARIA) | 54 |
| Europe (Eurochart Hot 100) | 28 |
| Europe (European Dance Radio) | 3 |
| Europe (European Hit Radio) | 5 |
| Germany (GfK) | 59 |
| Iceland (Íslenski Listinn Topp 40) | 37 |
| Israel (Israeli Singles Chart) | 19 |
| Italy (Musica e dischi) | 5 |
| Italy Airplay (Music & Media) | 2 |
| Netherlands (Dutch Top 40 Tipparade) | 18 |
| Netherlands (Single Top 100 Tipparade) | 9 |
| Scottish Singles Sales (Official Charts) | 20 |
| UK Singles (Official Charts) | 9 |
| UK Dance (Official Charts) | 2 |
| UK Hip Hop/R&B (Official Charts) | 3 |
| UK Airplay (Music Week) | 3 |
| UK Club Chart (Music Week) | 1 |

=== Year-end charts ===
| Chart (1995) | Position |
|---|---|
| Europe (European Hit Radio) | 36 |
| UK Airplay (Music Week) | 48 |
| UK Club Chart (Music Week) | 15 |

== Release history ==
| Region | Date | Format(s) | Label(s) | Ref(s). |
|---|---|---|---|---|
| United Kingdom | June 26, 1995 | CD; cassette | EMI United Kingdom; 1st Avenue | |
| United Kingdom | July 10, 1995 | 12-inch vinyl | EMI United Kingdom; 1st Avenue | |
| Australia | September 4, 1995 | CD | EMI United Kingdom; 1st Avenue | |
| Japan | September 13, 1995 | CD | EMI | |
| Australia | November 20, 1995 | Cassette | EMI United Kingdom; 1st Avenue | |
