= Never Saw a Miracle =

1992 single by Curtis Stigers

Single by Curtis Stigers

from the album Curtis Stigers
- Released: August 1992
- Genre: Jazz; soft rock
- Length: 3:43
- Label: Arista
- Songwriters: Barry Mann; Curtis Stigers
- Producer: Glen Ballard

Curtis Stigers singles chronology
"Sleeping with the Lights On" (1992)	"Never Saw a Miracle" (1992)	"This Time" (1995)

"Never Saw a Miracle" is a song by American singer Curtis Stigers, co-written by Stigers with Barry Mann. It was released in August 1992 by Arista Records as the fourth of the four charting singles released from his eponymous debut LP (1991). The song, produced by Glen Ballard, became an international hit, reaching the British and Canadian top 40. It made a lesser showing on pop charts in the United States. "Never Saw a Miracle" was a bigger adult contemporary hit, reaching number 13 in Canada and number five in the US.

== Charts ==
Chart (1992–93)	Peak position
Australia (ARIA)	177
Canada Top Singles (RPM)	39
Canada Adult Contemporary (RPM)	13
UK Singles (OCC)	34
UK Airplay (Music Week)	34
US Bubbling Under the Hot 100 (Billboard)	7
US Adult Contemporary (Billboard)	5

== Release history ==
Region	Date	Format(s)	Label(s)	Ref.
United States	August 1992	Cassette	Arista	
United Kingdom	October 5, 1992	7-inch vinyl; CD; cassette	Arista	
