= Tina Sugandh =

American musician and reality television personality

Tina Sugandh (born October 17, 1977) is an American musician and reality television personality. She is a principal cast member on season 1 of the Bravo reality television show, Newlyweds: The First Year (2013).

== Biography ==
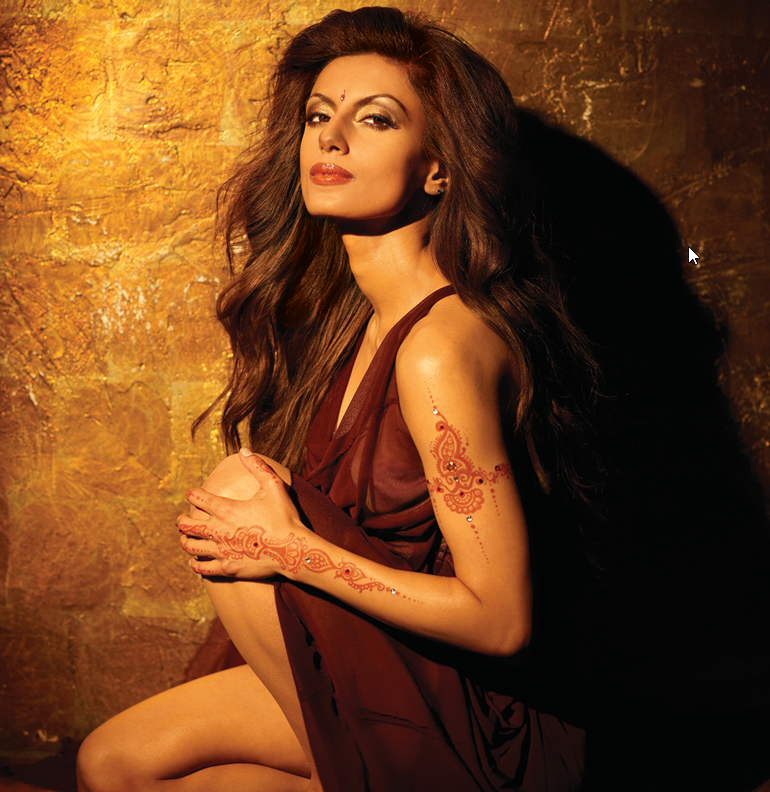
Tina Sugandh

Sugandh was born in Mumbai and moved with her family to Pennsylvania when she was five months old. Her sister, Seema Sugandh, sang and played a variety of instruments, her mother, Marketing Director and Singer on All India Radio Mumbai Geeta Sugandh, sang on the radio and at different functions while her father, Senior Professor Kanaiya, was a master of ceremonies, singer, and comedian.

Throughout Sugandh's school years, while maintaining high honors in school, her family performed globally.

At 15, Sugandh was encouraged by Sean Harris, a screenwriter and creative mentor. Harris eventually convinced Sugandh that she should pursue music as a career and, to that end, spent time working on a demo. Between her studies as a biology major at Rutgers University, and weekend performances with her family, Sugandh worked with Harris, who arranged photoshoots and studio plans for her and encouraged her to write her own music.

Sean Sullivan and Jay Jay French (Twisted Sister, Sevendust) signed her to their new company, Rebellion Entertainment. They spent the next year developing her songs and creating new demos. These demos lead to a publishing deal with Warner/Chappell Music, Hollywood Records, Disney, Z-TV India, and a Sony deal.

She has worked with producers Lester Mendez (Shakira, Enrique Iglesias and Jewel), Track & Field (Nelly Furtado), Ming & FS, Dr. Luke, Danny P and Timbaland.

== Professional career ==
After signing to Hollywood Records as a singer and to Warner/Chappell Music as a songwriter, Sugandh began hosting the program Asian Variety Show on Saturday mornings.

In 2008, her remix of "Break Me" reached #4 on the Billboard Dance Chart.

In 2009, Sugandh collaborated with Ringo Starr on his album Y Not.

In 2010, Sugandh released a single entitled "So Good", which features Fat Joe.

In 2013, Sugandh joined the cast of Bravo's TV show "Newlyweds The First Year", then subsequently went on to star in an additional Bravo Series, "People's Couch".

== Discography ==
- River of Dreams - Around The World In 80 Days (2004)
- There Is No Alternative (T.I.N.A.) - Ice Princess (2005)
- White Christmas - Christmas With The Kranks (2004)
- Lift Off - Raise Your Voice
- I Be What I Be - Masala! Mehndi! Masti! Festival (2005)
- Theme song from Hope & Faith with Kelly Ripa (2005)
- Break it Down - The Clique (2008)
- So Good Feat. Fat Joe - (2010)
- Adventure - Hanna's Gold (2011)

== Debut album ==
Her first solo album, TablaGirl, was supposed to come out on May 12, 2009, but after 3 years of recording with the world's top producers, was never released by Hollywood Records due to a change in marketing budget decisions. It was then sold to Sony Records, who was then to release it under their new exclusive distribution agreement in 2009 with Razor & Tie. Eventually it was released via digital download only.

No	Title	Writer(s)	Producer(s)
1	Jao	Tina Sugandh	Angelo Montrone, Lester Mendez
2	Bollywood Girl	Tina Sugandh	Angelo Montrone
3	You Without Me	Tina Sugandh	Angelo Montrone
4	Break Me	Tina Sugandh	Angelo Montrone
5	HisStory	Tina Sugandh	Angelo Montrone
6	Indestructible	Tina Sugandh	Angelo Montrone
7	Patiently Wait	Tina Sugandh	Angelo Montrone
8	T.I.n.a.	Tina Sugandh	Angelo Montrone
9	Love Junkie	Tina Sugandh	Angelo Montrone
10	Prisoner	Tina Sugandh	Angelo Montrone
11	*Stay	Tina Sugandh	Angelo Montrone
