= You're All That Matters to Me =

1992 single by Curtis Stigers

Single by Curtis Stigers

from the album Curtis Stigers
- B-side: "Count My Blessings"
- Released: 1992
- Length: 4:40
- Label: Arista
- Songwriters: Curtis Stigers; Gregg Sutton; Shelly Peiken
- Producer: Glen Ballard

Curtis Stigers singles chronology
"I Wonder Why" (1991)	"You're All That Matters to Me" (1992)	"Sleeping with the Lights On" (1992)

"You're All That Matters to Me" is a song by American singer-songwriter Curtis Stigers. It was the second single released from his debut studio album, Curtis Stigers (1991) by Arista Records, and peaked at number six on the UK Singles Chart in 1992. Although a commercial disappointment in the United States, the song reached the top 40 in Belgium, Ireland, and Canada, reaching number two on the Canadian RPM Adult Contemporary chart for three weeks. It is written by Stigers with Gregg Sutton and Shelly Peiken, and produced by Glen Ballard.

== Charts ==
=== Weekly charts ===
Chart (1992)	Peak position
Belgium (Ultratop 50 Flanders)	32
Canada Top Singles (RPM)	38
Canada Adult Contemporary (RPM)	2
Europe (Eurochart Hot 100)	16
Germany (GfK)	54
Ireland (IRMA)	11
Netherlands (Single Top 100)	83
UK Singles (Official Charts)	6
UK Airplay (Music Week)	1
US Billboard Hot 100	98
US Adult Contemporary (Billboard)	17
US Cash Box Top 100	50

=== Year-end charts ===
Chart (1992)	Position
Canada Adult Contemporary (RPM)	24
UK Singles (OCC)	59
UK Airplay (Music Week)	14

== Release history ==
Region	Date	Format(s)	Label(s)	Ref.
United States	1992	7-inch vinyl; cassette	Arista	
United Kingdom	March 16, 1992	7-inch vinyl; 12-inch vinyl; CD; cassette	Arista	
Japan	March 21, 1992	Mini-CD	Arista	
United Kingdom	March 23, 1992	7-inch poster sleeve vinyl	Arista	
Australia	April 12, 1993	CD; cassette	Arista	
