= Robert Etoll =

American composer, producer, and multi-instrumentalist

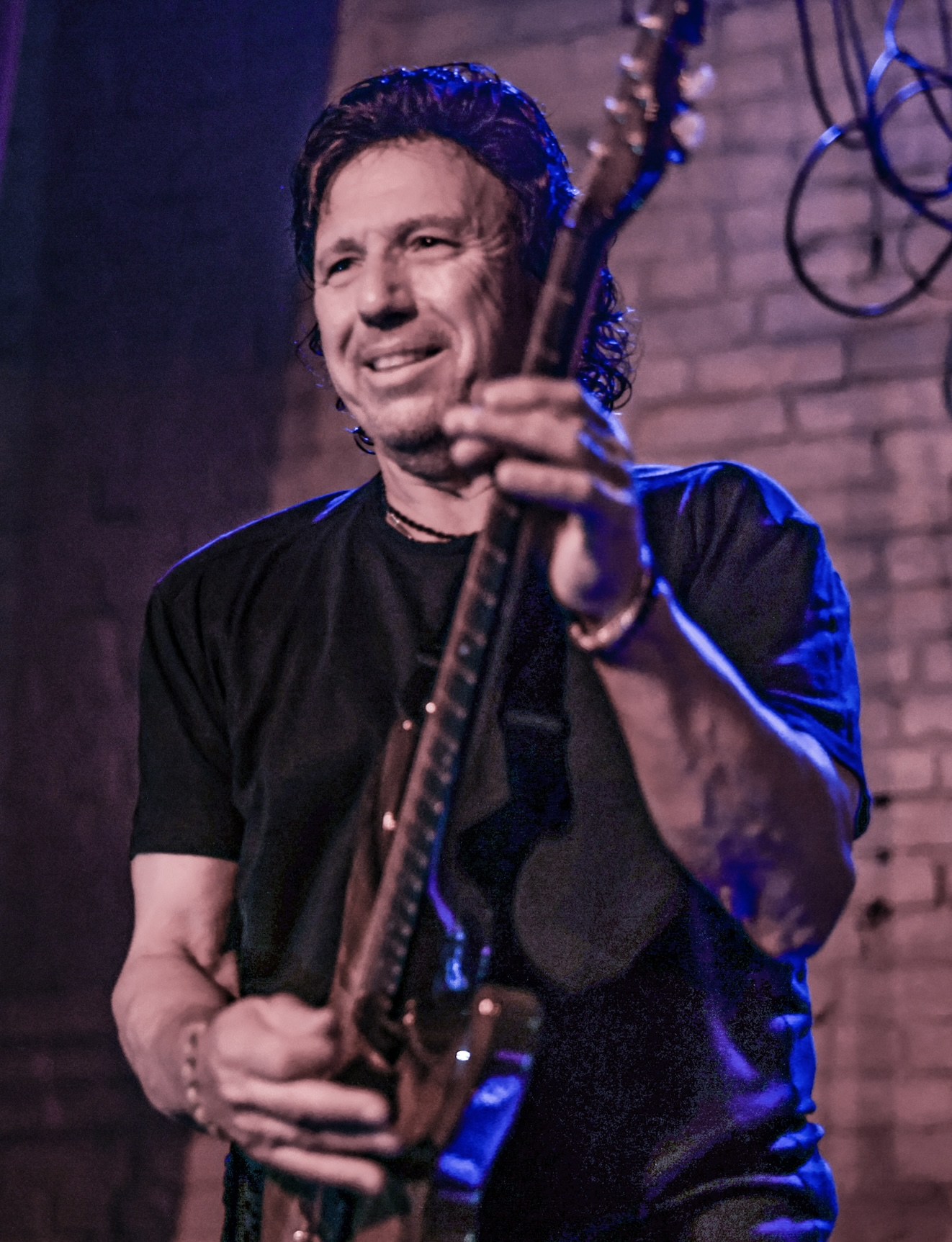
- Born: July 20, 1953 (age 73); Troy, New York, U.S.
- Education: Berklee College of Music
- Occupations: Multi-instrumentalist, songwriter, composer, music producer, sound designer, film composer
- Website: robertetollproductions.com

Robert Etoll (born July 20, 1953) is an American multi-instrumentalist, songwriter, composer, music producer, sound designer, and film composer. He is best known for his work as a composer and producer through his company, Q-Factory Music.

== Early life ==
Etoll was born and raised in Troy, New York. He began guitar lessons at age seven at Miller's Music and later at the Troy Music Academy. During his teenage years, he also studied piano. He graduated from Lansingburgh High School.

His first band, The Marlins — later renamed Sweet Silence — performed at local CYO and high school dances, block parties, and other community events. In 1971, the group won a local battle of the bands competition and opened for The Grass Roots at the Saratoga Performing Arts Center in Saratoga Springs, NY.

Etoll later attended Berklee College of Music, where he studied guitar performance, composition, and arranging.

== Career ==
While studying at Berklee, Etoll joined an established horn band that later became Back Bay Brew, a funk-rock-soul group that toured from Boston down the eastern seaboard to Florida. After the group disbanded, he moved to Los Angeles in 1976, where he worked as a session musician and toured Europe with renowned drummer, Alphonse Mouzon.

By the late 1980s, Etoll had signed as a songwriter with Warner Chappell Music and later MCA Music Publishing. His songs were recorded by various artists including The Pointer Sisters, Reba McEntire, and Akina Nakamori.

In addition to songwriting and music production, Etoll composed music for films, documentaries, television series, and game shows. He also served for 18 years as the house composer for Cessna Aircraft, creating music and sound design for corporate campaigns.

A director of one of the films he scored invited Etoll to compose a 30-second television spot for The Godfather Part III for Paramount Pictures, set to air during the Super Bowl. The project marked his entry into music composition and sound design for the trailer industry. Soon after, Etoll founded Q-Factory Music.

Etoll contributed as a music producer and composer for the Japanese animated television series Zoids. He also provided music for the game show Lingo.

During the 1990s, Etoll taught Music for Film and Television for UCLA Extension.

== Film and television work ==
=== Film scores ===
Year	Title	Role	Ref
1987	The Danger Zone	Composer	
1987	Vampire at Midnight	Composer	
1989	Danger Zone II: Reaper's Revenge	Composer	
1990	Danger Zone III: Steel Horse War	Composer	
1993	Running Cool	Composer	
1994	Death Riders	Composer	
1994	Would You Kindly Direct Me to Hell?: The Infamous Dorothy Parker	Composer	
2001	Never Say Never Mind: The Swedish Bikini Team	Composer	
2002–2007	Lingo	Composer	

=== Additional music ===
Year	Title	Role	Ref
1987	Vampire at Midnight	Score performer	
1992	To Protect and Serve	Music supervisor	
2003	Before We Ruled the Earth	Additional music	
2003	Dinosaur Planet	Additional music, composer	
2005	Avia Vampire Hunter	Music	
2006	Monster House	Trailer music composer	
2015–	Disney anthology television series	Producer (Heaven's Triumph)	
2018	Die 1000 Glotzböbbel vom Dr. Mabuse	Musician	
2023	Teenage Mutant Ninja Turtles: Mutant Mayhem	Composer (promotional music)	
2025	Enigma Black Stage	Producer (Q-Factory Music; Frolicking Mayhem)	

=== Soundtrack contributions ===
Year	Title	Contribution	Ref
1987	The Danger Zone	Lyrics & music (Bad Men Ridin, etc.)	
1987	Vampire at Midnight	Lyrics & music (Midnight Kiss, Steppin' Right, etc.), Performer	
1987	Super 88	Writer (Every Body Tells a Story)	
1988	Martika	Writer (It's Not What You're Doing)	
1988	Femme Fatale (Akina Nakamori album)	Writer (“Paradise Lost (Love Is in Fashion)”, “Move Me (Strictly Confidential)”)	
1990	Viva el espectáculo	Writer (Loca tentación)	
1992	Love Songs (Jennifer Love Hewitt album)	Writer (“Bedtime Stories”, “First Taste of Love”, “I’ll Find You”, “Listen (To Your Heart)”, “Won’t U B Mine”)	
1994	Exit to Eden	Performer (Why Can't We Live Together), Writer (Lift Me Up)	
2003	Dinosaur Planet	Soundtrack contributor	
2004	The Princess Diaries 2: Royal Engagement	Writer (Genovia Fight Song)	
2008	First Blood Part II: How to Become Rambo Part 2	Writer (Urban Soul)	
2009	A Single Man	Writer (Moon Over Manhattan)	
2012	Piranha 3DD	Writer, Performer (Head Banger)	
2025	Saipan	Performer (True Believer)	

== Discography ==
Year	Title	Ref
2010	Sound Design, Volume 5	
2012	Final Reckoning	
2012	Quest – An Epic Dark Adventure	
2014	Chemical Rage	
2015	Story of Life – Uplifting Hopeful Music	
2015	Rage – Dark Industrial Rock	
2015	Shadows from Beyond	
2019	Emotiva (String Quartet)	
2022	Black and White – Emotional Piano	
2022	Wondrous Labyrinth	
2024	Dilemma	
2024	Final Glory	
