= Meldac =

Japanese music and video game company

- Type: Private
- Industry: Video games, Music industry
- Founded: July 1985
- Founder: Hiromu Takamizawa; Tohru Sasaki; Tetsu Kiso; Hajime Toyama
- Headquarters: Japan
- Owner: Dark Ducks (through Dark Ducks Office Co. Ltd.), Mitsubishi Electric, Nippon Crown (1985–2001); Tri-M (2001–2005); Tokuma Japan Communications (2005–present)

Meldac (メルダック, Merudakku) is a Japanese music and video game company. It was founded in July 1985 by Hiromu Takamizawa, Tohru Sasaki, Tetsu Kiso, and Hajime Toyama — all members of the now-defunct vocal group Dark Ducks — with financial backing from the Mitsubishi keiretsu and its affiliates, including former Mitsubishi Electric subsidiary Nippon Crown.

They also had a subsidiary in America called Meldac of America before it became defunct in 1992. The rights to Meldac's unfinished titles, including WordZap, were picked up by Jaleco.

Meldac has produced albums for Jennifer Love Hewitt (Love Songs), Christopher Sluka, and J-Walk. In addition to music albums, the company also published video games such as Zombie Nation for the Nintendo Entertainment System. They also ported Heiankyo Alien and Mercenary Force for the Game Boy in addition to Uchuu Race: Astro Go! Go! for the Super Famicom.

Since 2005, the label has been owned by Tokuma Japan Communications.

== Discography ==
The company's first release was the Dark Ducks studio album As Time Goes By 1930-40 (catalog number: MED-1).

- Jennifer Love Hewitt - Love Songs (MECP-28003)

== Video games ==
- V'Ball (1989)
- Heiankyo Alien (1990)
- Mercenary Force (1990)
- Zombie Nation (1990)
- Battle of Kingdom (1991)
- The King of Rally (1992)
- Yomihon Yumegoyomi: Tenjin Kaisen 2 (1992) – Japan only Game Boy sequel to Tenjin Kaisen (Mercenary Force)
- Super Pinball: Behind the Mask (1994)
- Uchuu Race: Astro Go! Go! (1994)
