= Mercenary Force =

- Publisher: Meldac of America (US)
- Platform: Game Boy
- Release: JP: April 27, 1990; US: October 1990
- Genre: Shoot 'em up
- Mode: Single-player

Mercenary Force (Note: Japanese: 天神怪戦, Hepburn: Tenjin Kaisen; lit. 'The Tenjin Battle') is a 1990 shoot 'em up video game developed for the Game Boy. The video game is set in the Shogunate-era of Japan where the player must choose five of six possible mercenaries with different abilities and skills for each level.

On its release in 1990, some reviewers complimented the game's unique setup of choosing characters with different skills in a shooter game; others found it ultimately did not change a game that was very difficult.

== Gameplay ==
Mercenary Force is a side scrolling shoot 'em up video game. The game is set in the Shogunate-era of Japan where the player chooses four out of a possible five mercenaries. Each of these mercenaries costs a different of yen to hire and have different stats measuring their amount of health, their regular attack is and how their special attack is done. The player can also choose the formation of these characters.

== Development and release ==
Specifics on who developed and published Mercenary Force have been described by video game journalist John Szczepaniak as being "difficult to come by", writing that three obscure Japanese companies were involved: Meldac, Live Planning and Lenar. These companies were also involved with two other titles for the Game Boy: Heiankyo Alien and Battle of Kingdom.

Mercenary Force was released in Japan for the Game Boy on April 27, 1990. It was released for the American market in October 1990, where it was published by Meldac of America. On its release in the Western world, no references to its cultural origins in Japan were removed. A sequel was released in Japan as Yomihon Yumegoyomi: Tenjin Kaisen 2 in 1992.

== Reception ==
Reception

Review scores
Publication	Score
Famitsu	6/10, 6/10, 7/10, 5/10
Game Zone	82/100
Total!	54%

A reviewer in GamePro described the game as being both unusual and challenging, while complimenting its graphics and gameplay. Paul Lakin of Game Zone while saying that players can shuffle their team, but that most of the time the game's action was fairly normal moving and firing. He ultimately described it as an "above average shooter".

Four writerss in the Japanese video game magazine Famitsu reviewed the game. Three of the reviewers found the game monotonous with one saying that while the setting is new and that they were glad it deviated from the trend of puzzle games for the Game Boy, it ultimately did not change how the gameplay was overall. While one reviewer complimented the upbeat music and characters, three also found it difficult with one saying that the game felt too restrictve on a smaller Game Boy screen. A reviewer in Total! found it to be a difficult and original game, but ultimately found its addition of more characters was more of a hindrance then anything.

== See also ==
- List of Game Boy games
