= Dana Dawson =

American actress

- Born: August 7, 1974; Queens, New York, U.S.
- Died: August 10, 2010 (aged 36); New York City, New York, U.S.
- Occupations: Actress, singer
- Years active: 1981–2010
- Spouse: Jason Curry (m. 2007)

Dana Dawson (August 7, 1974 – August 10, 2010) was an American actress and singer.

== Early life and career ==
Dawson made her acting debut at the age of seven in a national tour of Annie. She was an understudy of the character Mimi, in the national tour of Rent in 2000 and joined the Broadway cast in 2001. In an interview in The Patriot-News (Harrisburg, Pennsylvania) Dawson said that she was given time to become secure in each of the two roles she understudied – Mimi and Joanne – before learning the other.

As a singer, Dawson released her first single in 1988 at the age of 14. The song "Ready To Follow You" was penned by French singer Jacqueline Taïeb and produced in France, and reached the Top 20 on the French single chart. Dawson then worked with French producers on her debut album, Paris New York And Me, which includes her debut single and spawned four other singles that enjoyed success in France in the early 1990s, especially "Romantic World" and "Tell Me Bonita", which both peaked at number 4 on the French single chart. Paris, New York and Me was also certified gold in France.

In 1993, Dawson took a break of two years to give her career more international impact: even though she had a lot of success in France, her records were not really available in other countries. So Dawson signed a recording contract with EMI and was now musically based in the UK. Her second album, Black Butterfly, was released in October 1995, and included three singles that made the UK Singles Chart: "3 Is Family" reached number 9 in July 1995, "Got to Give Me Love" reached number 27 in October 1995, and "Show Me" reached number 28 in May 1996. The album was available all over Europe and also in Japan. "3 is Family" was the major hit of the album and Dawson promoted it all over Europe. In 1996, she released the single "How I Wanna Be Loved" but it failed to reach the Top 40 in the UK Singles Chart. It was eventually included on a UK re-issue of the Black Butterfly album.

In 1997, Dawson collaborated on the Dolce & Gabbana single "More, More, More", and provided the vocals on this dance cover version of the Andrea True Connection hit single.

The Disney Channel show Lizzie McGuire featured her 2001 single, "Nice Life", which was only released as a single in France.

Several multi-track "singles" of Dawson's music have been released in the United Kingdom, including "3 Is Family", "Got to Give Me Love", and "How I Wanna Be Loved".

Dawson's songs are included on many other albums, including EMI's Music of the Twentieth Century: 1980–1999 and Virgin's Best Dance Album 1995; she also performed on the Michael W. Smith 1989 Gospel album I 2 Eye.

== Personal life ==
Dawson married the New York jazz artist and musician Jason Curry on July 7, 2007, in Hamilton, Bermuda.

She died on August 10, 2010, of colorectal cancer, at age 36.

== Discography ==
=== Albums ===
- 1991: Paris, New York and Me
- 1995: Black Butterfly (re-released in the UK in 1996 with one bonus track)

=== Singles ===
Year	Single	Peak positions							Album
Year	Single	AUS	BEL (FLA)	FRA	GER	ITA	SWE	UK	Album
1988	"Ready to Follow You"	—	33	15	—	—	—	—	Single only
1990	"Romantic World"	113	33	4	—	—	33	—	Paris New-York and Me
1991	"Tell Me Bonita"	—	—	4	—	—	—	—	Paris New-York and Me
1991	"Open Hearts"	—	—	24	—	—	—	—	Paris New-York and Me
1992	"Moving On"	—	—	—	—	—	—	—	Paris New-York and Me
1995	"3 Is Family"	54	—	—	59	6	—	9	Black Butterfly
1995	"Got to Give Me Love"	68	—	—	—	22	—	27	Black Butterfly
1996	"Show Me"	—	—	—	—	18	—	28	Black Butterfly
1996	"How I Wanna Be Loved"	—	—	—	—	—	—	42	Black Butterfly
1997	"More More More" (by Dolce & Gabbana)	—	—	—	—	—	—	—	Singles only
2001	"Nice Life" (France only)	—	—	—	—	—	—	—	Singles only
"—" denotes releases that did not chart or were not released.
