= Uchū Race: Astro Go! Go! =

1994 video game

- Cover art
- Developers: KAZe Co., Ltd.
- Publisher: Meldac
- Director: Norio Nakagata
- Programmer: Yoshiaki Suzuki
- Composer: Yūsuke Takahama
- Platform: Super Famicom
- Release: JP: February 25, 1994
- Genre: Futuristic racing
- Mode: Single-player

Uchū Race: Astro Go! Go! (宇宙レース アストロゴー！ゴー！; "Space Race: Astro Go! Go!") is a Japan-exclusive racing video game for the Super Famicom.

== Gameplay ==
Racing in Pinball Colony 2.

Although the game is in 3D, there is no camera rotation in the game.

Unlike F-Zero, losing the race due to death (falling in pits, running out of energy, etc.) is impossible because the rescue vehicle is always available to rescue players. The services of the rescue vehicle are used when the player is stuck in an unrecoverable situation or when the player falls into the bottomless pit. Players have a choice between a time trial mode and a Grand Prix mode. In the Grand Prix mode, the player is given five chances to get third place or better. Losing five times would ask the player to continue the game using the standings earned prior to getting disqualified, but the sixth loss would lead to a game over.

The player's top five total times and the player's fastest lap are stored in the game's internal battery-backed RAM. All fifteen courses can be played from the time trial mode, even those that have never been raced on Grand Prix mode. The game is single-player only.

== Cancelled North American release ==
A North American version was planned titled Freeway Flyboys, but was unreleased. The American version was reviewed in the July 1994 issue (Volume 62) of Nintendo Power which likened the game as a combination between F-Zero and The Care Bears (most likely referencing the 1985–88 television series produced by DIC Entertainment and Nelvana). The cancelled North American version said that the game took place on the planet Daisy Age, but instead took place on several planets.

== Reception ==
Reception

Review scores
| Publication | Score |
|---|---|
| Consoles + | 80% |
| Computer and Video Games | 69/100 |
| Official Nintendo Magazine | 80/100 |
| Super Play | 51% |
| Total! | 80% |
| Video Games (DE) | 81% |
| Super Gamer | 55/100 |

German video gaming magazine Total! gave Uchū Race: Astro Go! Go! a rating of 3.25 of out 6.
