= How Do I Deal =

1998 single by Jennifer Love Hewitt

Single by Jennifer Love Hewitt

from the album I Still Know What You Did Last Summer soundtrack
- Released: November 17, 1998
- Length: 3:23
- Label: 143; Warner Bros.
- Songwriters: Dillon O'Brian; Phil Roy; Bob Thiele
- Producers: Bruce Fairbairn; David Foster

Jennifer Love Hewitt singles chronology
"I Believe In..." (1997)	"How Do I Deal" (1998)	"BareNaked" (2002)

"How Do I Deal" is a song by American actress Jennifer Love Hewitt from the soundtrack to the film I Still Know What You Did Last Summer. The song was released as a single on November 17, 1998, with an accompanying music video. The single became Hewitt's one and only appearance on the US Billboard Hot 100 singles chart, peaking at number 59 during a seven-week run. Worldwide, the single reached number five in New Zealand and number eight in Australia, where it is certified gold.

== Track listings ==
US CD, 7-inch, and cassette single

1. "How Do I Deal" (single version) – 3:23
2. "Try to Say Goodbye" (performed by Jory Eve) – 3:36

European CD single

1. "How Do I Deal" – 3:24
2. "Sugar Is Sweeter" (performed by CJ Bolland) – 5:34

Australian CD single

1. "How Do I Deal" – 3:23
2. "Sugar Is Sweeter" (Danny Saber Remix featuring Justin Warfield, performed by CJ Bolland) – 4:57
3. "Try to Say Goodbye" (performed by Jory Eve) – 3:35

== Charts ==
=== Weekly charts ===
Chart (1998–1999)	Peak position
Australia (ARIA)	8
New Zealand (Recorded Music NZ)	5
US Billboard Hot 100	59
US Pop Airplay (Billboard)	36

=== Year-end charts ===
Chart (1999)	Position
Australia (ARIA)	61

== Certifications ==
Region	Certification	Certified units/sales
Australia (ARIA)	Gold	35,000^{^}
^{^} Shipments figures based on certification alone.

== Release history ==
Region	Date	Format(s)	Label(s)	Ref.
United States	November 17, 1998	Rhythmic contemporary; contemporary hit radio	143; Warner Bros.	
Australia	January 19, 1999	CD	143; Warner Bros.	
