= Curtis Stigers =

American jazz singer (born 1965)

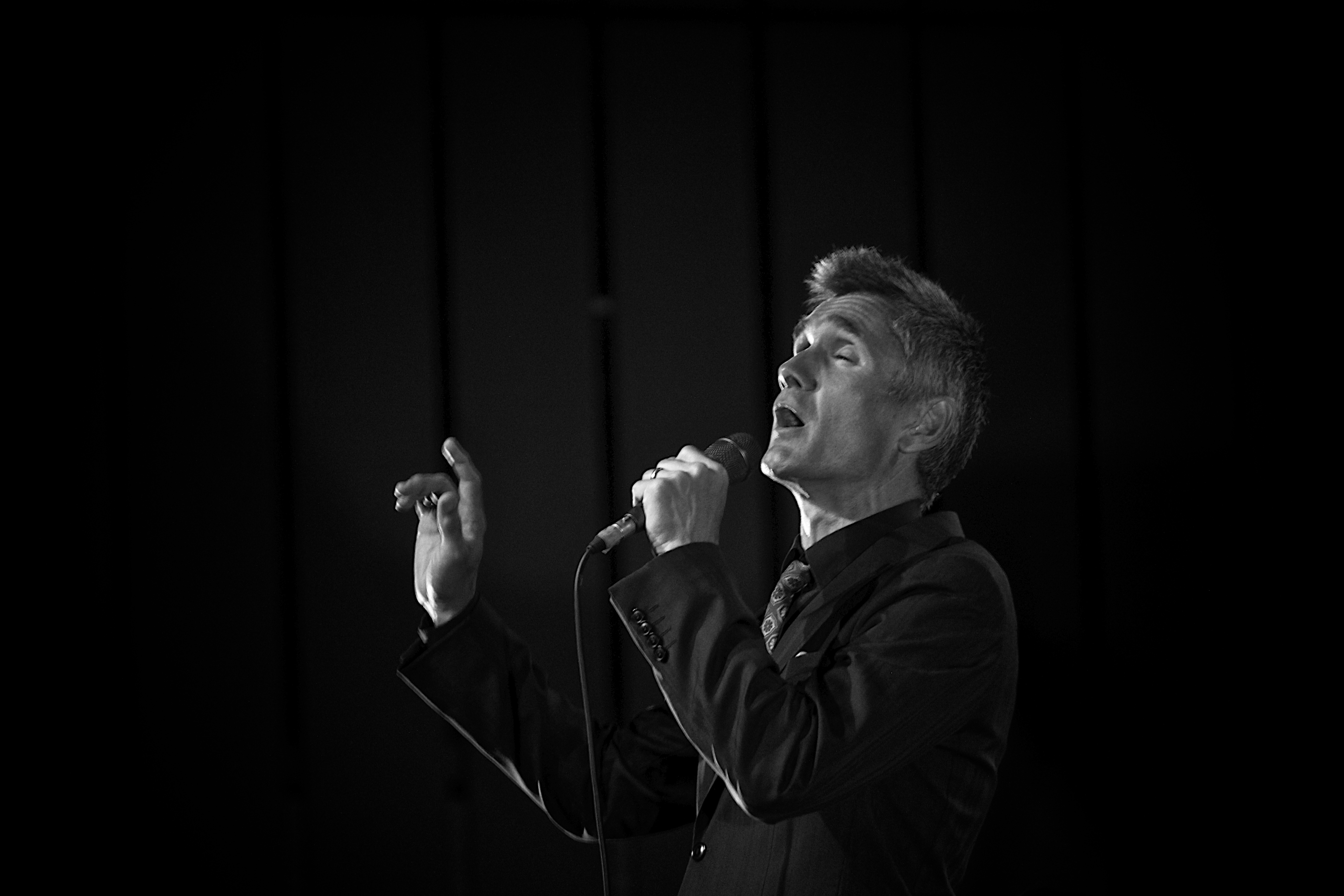
- Stigers performs at the Wigan Jazz Festival in 2010

Background information
- Born: October 18, 1965 (age 60); Hollywood, California, U.S.
- Origin: Boise, Idaho, U.S.
- Genres: Jazz, soft rock
- Occupation: Singer-songwriter
- Instruments: Vocals, saxophone, guitar
- Labels: Arista, Columbia, Concord Jazz

Curtis Stigers (born October 18, 1965) is an American jazz singer. He achieved a number of hits in the early 1990s, most notably the international hit "I Wonder Why" (1991), which reached No. 5 in the UK and No. 9 in the US.

== Career ==
Stigers was born in Hollywood, California, but grew up in Boise, Idaho. He started his music career as a teenager, playing in rock and blues bands, as well as receiving an education in clarinet and saxophone in high school in Boise. He acquired much of his motivation for pursuing jazz from jam sessions led by Gene Harris at the Idanha Hotel. His song "Swingin' Down at Tenth and Main" is a tribute to those times with Harris. After graduation from high school, he moved to New York City, intending to become a rock musician. But he spent more time in jazz clubs singing and playing saxophone.

Arista released his debut album, which achieved multi-platinum sales. His combination of rock and soul was also popular on the soundtrack to the 1992 movie The Bodyguard, which contained his version of "(What's So Funny 'Bout) Peace, Love, and Understanding" by Nick Lowe. Concord Jazz released Baby Plays Around, an album that included Chris Minh Doky and Randy Brecker. He recorded several more jazzy albums for Concord before turning to the country flavor of his 2012 album Let's Go Out Tonight with cover versions of songs by Steve Earle, Richard Thompson, and Hayes Carll.

He has worked with Elton John, Eric Clapton, Prince, Bonnie Raitt, Rod Stewart, The Allman Brothers Band and Joe Cocker. He sang a duet with Julia Fordham on her re-recording of "Where Does the Time Go?" on the 1998 compilation album The Julia Fordham Collection.

His song "I Wonder Why" reached No. 5 on the UK Singles Chart and No. 9 on the United States Billboard Hot 100 chart in 1991, while "You're All That Matters to Me" reached No. 6 as the follow-up single in the UK. In 2006, Stigers participated in the BBC Television show Just the Two of Us, where he sang with journalist Penny Smith. He was one of the soloists at a concert celebrating the MGM musical during the 2009 Proms season. His song "This Life" was for the American television show Sons of Anarchy. He also sang "John the Revelator" for the season one finale.

== Discography ==
=== Studio albums ===
Year	Title	Label	Peak chart positions						Certifications
Year	Title	Label	US	US Heat.	US Jazz	NLD	SWE	UK	Certifications
1991	Curtis Stigers	Arista	101	1	—	27	24	7	BPI: 2× Platinum
1995	Time Was	Arista	—	25	—	—	—	34	
1999	Brighter Days	Columbia	—	—	—	—	—	—	
2001	Baby Plays Around	Concord Jazz	—	—	24	—	—	—	
2002	Secret Heart	Concord Jazz	—	—	18	—	—	—	
2003	You Inspire Me	Concord Jazz	—	—	—	—	—	—	
2005	I Think It's Going to Rain Today	Concord Jazz	—	—	16	—	—	—	
2007	Real Emotional	Concord	—	—	—	—	—	—	
2009	Lost in Dreams	Concord	—	—	39	—	—	—	
2012	Let's Go Out Tonight	Concord Jazz	—	—	22	—	—	—	
2014	Hooray for Love	Concord Jazz	—	—	—	—	—	64	
2017	One More for the Road (live album; with the Danish Radio Big Band)	Concord Jazz	—	—	—	—	—	—	
2020	Gentleman	EmArcy	—	—	—	—	—	—	
2022	This Life	EmArcy	—	—	—	—	—	—	
"—" denotes releases that did not chart or were not released in that territory.

=== Compilation albums ===
- All That Matters – The Best of Curtis Stigers (Camden, 2001)
- The Best of 1991 – 1999 (Sony BMG, 2005)
- The Collection (Concord, 2006) (UK No. 50)

=== Singles ===
Year	Title	Peak chart positions									Album
Year	Title	US Pop	US A/C	AUS	BE	IRE	NLD	NOR	SWE	UK	Album
1991	"I Wonder Why"	9	5	43	4	4	11	9	25	5	Curtis Stigers
1992	"You're All That Matters to Me"	98	17	—	32	11	83	—	—	6	Curtis Stigers
1992	"Sleeping with the Lights On"	96	—	200	—	—	—	—	—	53	Curtis Stigers
1992	"Never Saw a Miracle"	107	5	—	—	—	—	—	—	34	Curtis Stigers
1995	"This Time"	—	—	—	—	—	—	—	—	28	Time Was
1995	"Keep Me from the Cold"	—	—	—	—	—	—	—	—	57	Time Was
1996	"Everytime You Cry"	—	—	—	—	—	—	—	—	—	Time Was
1999	"End of the Afternoon"	—	—	—	—	—	—	—	—	—	Brighter Days
1999	"To Be Loved"	—	—	—	—	—	—	—	—	—	Brighter Days
2007	"I'll Be Your Baby Tonight"	—	—	—	—	—	—	—	—	—	Real Emotional
2012	"Things Have Changed"	—	—	—	—	—	—	—	—	—	Let's Go Out Tonight
2020	"Gentleman"	—	—	—	—	—	—	—	—	—	Gentleman
"—" denotes releases that did not chart or were not released in that territory.
