= Black Butterfly (Dana Dawson album) =

Studio album by Dana Dawson
- Released: 1995, 1996 (re-issue)
- Label: EMI
- Producer: Ric Wake; Lotti Golden; Tommy Faragher; Dennis Charles; Ronnie Wilson; Narada Michael Walden; Peter Zizzo; Erik "Smooth" Hicks

Dana Dawson chronology
Paris New-York and Me (1991)	Black Butterfly (1995)

Professional ratings
Review scores
Source	Rating
AllMusic	3/5 stars

Black Butterfly is the second and final album by American singer Dana Dawson, originally released in 1995. The album includes Dawson's biggest hit single, "3 Is Family", which charted in Australia and several European countries, reaching number 9 in the United Kingdom. Two more singles from the album achieved success on the UK Singles Chart, with "Got to Give Me Love" reaching number 27, and "Show Me" reaching number 28. Additionally, another single, "How I Wanna Be Loved," was later added to a re-issue of the album and reached number 42 on the UK Singles Chart.

Black Butterfly was Dawson's final studio album release before her death in 2010.

== Track listing ==
No.	Title	Writer(s)	Length
1.	"Black Butterfly" (interlude)	Dana Dawson; Sam Noel	0:39
2.	"3 Is Family"	Billy Mann	3:40
3.	"Got to Give Me Love"	Dawson; Tracy Ackerman; Lee Mack; Lotti Golden; Tommy Faragher	4:12
4.	"Show Me"	Dawson; Peter Vitesse	3:49
5.	"Dignified"	Dave James; Jackie Rawe	5:37
6.	"Visions" (interlude)	Dawson; James; Keith Beauvais	0:54
7.	"You Are My Baby"	Dawson; Narada Michael Walden; Sally Jo Dakota	5:23
8.	"So Good Together"	Golden; Faragher	4:13
9.	"How I Wanna Be Loved"	Mann; Wayne Cohen	3:46
10.	"All of These Things"	Dawson; Peter Zizzo	4:13
11.	"Nothing in This World"	Golden; Faragher	4:58
12.	"Love Me" (interlude)	Dawson; James; Beauvais	0:43
13.	"Baby Do Right By Me"	Simon Climie; Lulu; Billy Lawrie	4:00
14.	"Stop Yourself"	Dawson; Dennis Charles; Ronnie Wilson	4:15
15.	"Intentions"	Dawson; Charles; Wilson	4:00
16.	"Touch Me"	Walden; Erik Hicks; Brian Hughes	4:52
17.	"Proverbs" (interlude)	Dawson; James; Beauvais	0:42
18.	"Sad Sad Songs"	Dawson; Golden; Faragher; Maria Christianson	4:37
19.	"Home" (interlude)	Dawson; James; Beauvais	0:16
20.	"Salvation"	Dawson; Climie	5:53
21.	"Angel" (interlude)	Dawson; James; Beauvais	0:14

Note

- Track 9 was added to the 1996 re-issue of the album.
