= Angelo Montrone =

American songwriter

Angelo Montrone is an American record producer, songwriter, and talent scout (A&R). Montrone has played a key role as producer and A&R man for Grammy-winning acts including Matisyahu and Los Lonely Boys, as well as producing acts such as jam band favorite Railroad Earth, and discovering a young Jennifer Love Hewitt. Over the course of his nearly 30-year career, he has worked as an independent record producer as well as being a staff producer and A&R man for Sony, Elektra Entertainment, Atlantic Records, Or Music, Razor & Tie, and Majestic Music. Montrone had a #4 song on the Billboard Dance Charts with "Break Me". Also, his song "Free to Be a Woman" was the theme song for the Style Network's show The Modern Girl. He is the founder and CEO of the Majestic Music record label based in Hampton Falls, New Hampshire.

== Biography ==
Montrone began playing piano at the age of seven, qualified for a school violin program at 10, played trombone in his school band from ages 11 through 13, and throughout that time sang and did solo piano performances for his school. At 14 he got into his first rock band as a keyboard player, and at 16 was playing professionally as lead singer and keyboard player in the band he cofounded, Amadeus, which performed around the New England area.

During the 1990s, Montrone made forays into the music industry as protégé to producers Arif Mardin and Tommy LiPuma. It was during this time that Montrone also began his lifelong working friendship with 21-time Grammy engineer Al Schmitt, with whom he co-owned the music rental company A&A Vintage Rentals.

The 1990s also marked Montrone's start as a talent scout; he discovered both Jonatha Brooke and Jennifer Love Hewitt. Angelo went on to produce Love Hewitt's American debut album, Let's Go Bang, with Atlantic Records CEO Doug Morris, who acted as executive producer.

After working independently as a producer and engineer for a number of years, Montrone was hired by Sony music executive Michael Caplan to be Director of A&R and Staff Producer for their upstart record label, Or Music. Together with Caplan, he signed and developed the careers of Los Lonely Boys, Matisyahu, and Pitty Sing, and oversaw artists Tower of Power, John Cale, Alejandro Escovedo, and more. It was during this time that one of Montrone's songs, "Free to Be a Woman", became the theme song for the Style Network's The Modern Girl.

In 2006, Montrone was hired by Sony Music as an A&R talent scout and staff producer for the Sony subsidiary, One Haven Music. Here, he discovered Tina Sugandh, for whom he produced and cowrote "Break Me" (#4 on the Billboard Dance Charts). Along with production and songwriting, Montrone worked as a consultant at One Haven, providing direction for artists such as Ozzy Osbourne, Coheed and Cambria, and more.

During this time, Montrone wrote an open letter to the music industry, which was featured on Bob Lefsetz's blog, "The Lefsetz Letter". Montrone challenged his fellow record executives to forgo extreme compression during the mastering process in favor of greater dynamic range. The phenomenon of ever-increasing compression decried by Montrone is often referred to as the "loudness war".

Montrone's latest endeavour has brought him to the New England town of Hampton Falls, New Hampshire, where he has established, Majestic Music LLC, a nontraditional record label that emphasis artist development and engages in joint ownership partnerships rather than record contracts. Located within a modified 1803 farmhouse Majestic Music combines a world class recording studio, a treasure-trove of musical instruments and bed & breakfast style accommodations. This all in one facility allows Montrone to work with artists from around the globe providing personalized artist development and recording the results with audiophile quality.

== Discography ==
- Michael Jackson, Michael (Sony Music Entertainment): engineering
- Kina Grannis, Stairwells (One Haven Music): Producer, Recording, Mixing, Mastering. #5 Billboard Top Internet Albums chart, #2 Billboard Heatseekers chart, #18 Billboard Independent Albums chart.
- Elizabeth Valgur, Valgur (Universal Music, Mexico): Mixing (album)
- Railroad Earth, Railroad Earth (One Haven Music): Producer, Recording, Mixing, Mastering. Named #1 album of 2010 by JamBands Online
- Matisyahu, Live at Stubs: Producer, Mixer, Recording, Mastering #1 Reggae album (Billboard), #2 Reggae album of the decade 2000-2010 (Billboard)
- Matisyahu Live in Israel DVD (Sony), Mixer, Production Consultant
- Matisyahu No Place To Be (Sony) Producer, Mixer, Recording
- Los Lonely Boys (Or Music/Sony): Acoustic tracks, live tracks: Producer, Mixer, Recording, A&R (Grammy for Best Pop Performance, 2005)
- Semi Precious Weapons (Razor & Tie): Mixing, A&R. Touring with Lady Gaga.
- Tina Sugandh (Razor & Tie) Producer, Songwriter (seven songs), Mixer, Recording. Single "Break Me" #4 Billboard Dance Chart (co writer, producer).
- "Free To Be A Woman" featuring Jennifer Love Hewitt: Theme Song for Style Network's "The Modern Girl" Songwriter, Producer, Mixing, Recording
- Katia Cadet: album, Boundless, Mixing
- Katia Cadet: Recording, Mixing Lan Mo Devan benefit for Haiti
- Endeverafter (Razor & Tie) Mixing
- Pitty Sing Demons, You Are the Stars in Cars 'Til I Die (Or Music) Producer, Recording, Mixing, A&R
- Tower of Power Live at the Village Underground (Or Music) Mixing, Recording, A&R
- Michael Showalter (Comedian) Sandwiches and Cats Recording
- Alejandro Escovedo "Por Vida" Tribute (including Lucinda Williams, Steve Earle, Calexico, Cowboy Junkies, Charlie Sexton, John Cale): Mastering, A&R
- Alpha Rev - Producer, Recording, Mixing
- Jennifer Love Hewitt "Let's Go Bang" (Atlantic Records) Producer, Songwriter, Keyboards
- Anita Baker "Rhythm of Love" (Elektra Records) Synth Programmer
- Natalie Cole "Take A Look" (Elektra Records) engineering
- Chaka Khan "The Woman I Am" (Warner Bros.) Assistant
- Roberta Flack "Set The Night To Music" (Atlantic Records) Assistant
- Soundtrack "Glengarry Glen Ross" (Elektra) Assistant Producer
- Little Jimmy Scott "All The Way" (Warner Bros) Assistant Producer
- Joe Sample "Invitation" Assistant Producer
- Howard Hewett "Allegiance" (Elektra) Assistant Producer
- Linda Eder "It's No Secret Anymore" (Atlantic) Assistant Engineer
- The Story (Jonatha Brooke), secured record deal with Elektra Records
- Jennifer Love Hewitt, secured deal with Atlantic Records
- 1991 Atlantic Records, Production assistant to Arif Mardin 1992: Elektra Records, A&R, Production assistant to Tommy LiPuma. Signed Jonatha Brooke and The Story, Jennifer Love Hewitt (to Atlantic Records). - 1994-2002: Independent Record Producer, Songwriter 1994: Created A&A Vintage Rentals with partner Al Schmitt).
- 2002-2005: Director of A&R, Staff Producer, Or Music (Los Lonely Boys, Matisyahu, Tower of Power, John Cale, Alejandro Escovedo, Pitty Sing)
- 2005-2007: A&R Consultant, Producer, Sony Music Entertainment (One Haven Music)
- 2007: A&R Consultant, Producer, Razor & Tie
- 2009: Launched Majestic Music Factory Studio, Brooklyn, New York
- 2013: Launched Majestic Music LLC
