= Can I Go Now =

2003 single by Jennifer Love Hewitt

Single by Jennifer Love Hewitt

from the album BareNaked
- B-side: "Just Try"
- Released: January 13, 2003
- Length: 3:36
- Label: Jive
- Songwriters: Meredith Brooks; Livingstone Brown; Mike Stevens
- Producer: Meredith Brooks

Jennifer Love Hewitt singles chronology
"BareNaked" (2002)	"Can I Go Now" (2003)	"You" (2003)

Music video
- "Can I Go Now" on YouTube

"Can I Go Now" is the second and final single from American actress Jennifer Love Hewitt's fourth studio album, BareNaked. The song was written by Mike Stevens, Livingstone Brown, and Meredith Brooks, who also produced the track, and was released as a single on January 13, 2003. The single failed to chart in the United States but peaked at number 12 in Australia and number eight in the Netherlands.

== Promotion ==
In order to promote the single, Hewitt appeared on TV shows and events including Pro Bowl, The Orlando Jones Show and performing an acoustic version of the song on Sessions@AOL.

== Track listing ==
Maxi-CD

1. "Can I Go Now" (radio mix) – 3:34
2. "Just Try" (album version) – 3:43
3. "I Know You Will" (album version) – 3:17
4. "Can I Go Now" (video)

== Charts ==
=== Weekly charts ===
Chart (2003)	Peak position
Australia (ARIA)	12
Belgium (Ultratop 50 Flanders)	20
Belgium (Ultratip Bubbling Under Wallonia)	3
Germany (GfK)	79
Netherlands (Dutch Top 40)	8
Netherlands (Single Top 100)	26
Switzerland (Schweizer Hitparade)	69

=== Year-end charts ===
Chart (2003)	Position
Australia (ARIA)	92

== Certifications ==
Region	Certification	Certified units/sales
Australia (ARIA)	Gold	35,000^{^}
^{^} Shipments figures based on certification alone.

== Release history ==
Region	Date	Format(s)	Label(s)	Ref.
Australia	January 13, 2003	CD	Jive	
Europe	February 17, 2003	CD	Jive	
United Kingdom	March 3, 2003	CD; cassette	Jive	
United States	March 24, 2003	Contemporary hit; hot adult contemporary radio	Jive	
