= Let's Go Bang =

Studio album by Jennifer Love Hewitt
- Released: September 12, 1995
- Recorded: 1994–1995
- Studio: Capitol Studios (Hollywood, California); Bill Schnee Studios and Two Guys From The Valley (North Hollywood, California); Red Zone Studios (Burbank, California); Robert Etoll Productions (Culver City, California); Power Station, Right Track Recording, Baby Monster Studios, AM Productions, Room With A View, East Hill Studios and River Sound (New York City, New York)
- Genre: Pop; Electronic
- Length: 48:48
- Label: Atlantic
- Producer: Angelo Montrone

Jennifer Love Hewitt chronology
Love Songs (1992)	Let's Go Bang (1995)	Jennifer Love Hewitt (1996)

Singles from Let's Go Bang
- 1. "Let's Go Bang" Released: July 12, 1995; 2. "Couldn't Find Another Man" Released: October 11, 1995

Professional ratings
Review scores
Source	Rating
AllMusic	3/5 stars

Let's Go Bang is the second studio album by American actress and singer Jennifer Love Hewitt.

It was released by Atlantic Records on September 12, 1995. It is also the first Hewitt album distributed by Atlantic. The producer, Angelo Montrone, had noticed her musical talents and brought her to the attention of then CEO of Atlantic Records, Doug Morris who then signed her. The album was received with enthusiasm by several program directors at pop radio, however, with the departure of Doug Morris from Atlantic in 1995 the plans for promotion were canceled which led to the album's commercial failure, failing to chart on the US Billboard 200.

The album features contributions from Pino Palladino, Steve Ferrone, John Robinson, and Harvey Mason.

One of the album's tracks, "Free to Be a Woman", written by Hewitt and Angelo Montrone, would go on to become the theme song for the series The Modern Girl, that aired on the Style Network.

== Album title ==
For many years, audiences interpreted the meaning of going to "bang" as a sexual innuendo. In a 2005 interview with Maxim, Hewitt was asked to elaborate on the meaning of the song: "It was supposed to be this dance called the 'Bang', and the song never hit so we never came up with the dance. Everybody just thought I was a really dirty 16-year-old."

== Track listing ==
Let's Go Bang track listing
No.	Title	Writer(s)	Length
1.	"Kiss Away from Heaven"	Peter Bliss; Angelo Montrone	4:24
2.	"Let's Go Bang"	Andy Goldmark; George Lyter; Bruce Roberts	5:00
3.	"The Difference Between Us"	Camus Celli; Nicky Holland; Andres Levin	5:03
4.	"Couldn't Find Another Man"	Montrone	4:44
5.	"You Make Me Smile"	L. Desmond; Ren Toppano	4:11
6.	"In Another Life"	Andrew Gold; Sam Lorber; Greg Prestopino	4:37
7.	"The Garden"	Montrone	0:22
8.	"Can't Stand in the Way of Love"	Wayne Cohen; Enid Levine	3:53
9.	"Free to Be a Woman"	Jennifer Love Hewitt; Montrone	4:09
10.	"Everywhere I Go"	Susan Pomerantz; Terrah Smith; Gerry Stober	4:12
11.	"Don't Turn Your Head Away"	Debbie Kaye; Montrone	4:31
12.	"Baby I'm-a Want You" (Bread cover)	David Gates	3:43
Total length:			48:48

== Personnel ==
=== Musicians ===
- Jennifer Love Hewitt – lead vocals, backing vocals (1, 2, 4–6, 8–11)
- Angelo Montrone – keyboards (1–4, 6, 8, 11), rhythm programming (1, 3, 8), synth bass (2), bass arrangements (2), acoustic piano (4, 9), programming (4, 6, 10, 11), synthesizers (9, 10), Hammond B3 organ (9), handclaps (9), electric piano (12)
- Peter Bliss – guitars (1)
- Paul Pesco – electric guitar (2, 9)
- Paul Jackson Jr. – acoustic guitar (3), electric guitar (8), acoustic guitar solo (10)
- Tony Seresene – acoustic guitar (3)
- Dean Parks – acoustic guitar (4), acoustic rhythm guitar (10)
- Hugh McCracken – electric guitar (5, 12)
- Michael Thompson – electric guitar (6, 10, 11)
- Freddie Washington – extra bass notes (1), additional bass notes (8), bass solo (9), bass (10)
- Pino Palladino – additional bass (2), bass (9)
- Neil Stubenhaus – fretless bass (4), bass (5, 11, 12)
- Steve Ferrone – drums (2, 4, 9)
- Harvey Mason – drums (5, 12), snare drum (8)
- John Robinson – drums (6, 11), hi-hat (8)
- Ricky Lawson – drums (10)
- Sheila E. – percussion (2)
- Carol Steele – cowbell (2), percussion (9), handclaps (9)
- Scott Austin – handclaps (9)
- Ben Wittman – percussion (12)
- Danny Wilensky – saxophone (9, 12)
- Craig Najjar – bass arrangements (2), acoustic piano (5), electric piano (5, 10)
- Michael O'Reilly – bass arrangements (2)
- Audrey Martell – backing vocals (1)
- Diva Gray – backing vocals (3, 5, 9, 12)
- Rosa Russ – backing vocals (3)
- Vaneese Thomas – backing vocals (3, 5, 9, 12)

Strings (Tracks 6 & 11)

- Bill Meyers – arrangements and conductor
- Larry Corbett, Paula Hochhalter, Suzie Katayama, Armen Ksadjikian, Steve Richards and Daniel Smith – cello
- Denyse Buffum, Scott Haupert and John Scanlon – viola
- Bruce Dukov, Endre Granat, Berj Garabedian, Harris Goldman, Karen Jones, Peter Kent, Robert Peterson, Rachel Robinson, Anatoli Rosinsky, Sheldon Sanov, Mark Sazer, Kwihee Shamban, Haim Shtrum and Valerie Vigoda - violin

Audience members on "Let's Go Bang"

- Matt Curry, Debbie Kaye, Angelo Montrone, Craig Najjar, Paul Pesco and Lara Tanbay

=== Production ===
- Doug Morris – executive producer
- Angelo Montrone – producer, assistant engineer
- Steve Boyer – engineer
- Denis Degher – engineer
- Joe Ferla – engineer
- Michael O'Reilly – engineer, mixing (2, 3, 6, 8, 9)
- Al Schmitt – engineer, mixing (5, 12)
- Steve Sykes – engineer
- Scott Sebring – vocal engineer
- Ray Bardani – mixing (1, 4, 10, 11)
- Matt Curry – additional engineer, mix assistant
- Dan Gellert – additional engineer
- Michael Wallace – additional vocal engineer, assistant engineer
- Alvaro Alencar – assistant engineer
- Scott Austin – assistant engineer
- Jerome Chaulin – assistant engineer
- Peter Doell – assistant engineer
- Tony Gonzales – assistant engineer
- John Hendrickson – assistant engineer
- Jay Militscher – assistant engineer
- Rory Romano – assistant engineer
- John Bleich – mix assistant
- Ted Jensen – mastering at Sterling Sound (New York, NY)
- Buzzy Rand – production assistant
- Joe Vulpis – production assistant
- Jill Dell'Abate – production coordinator
- Liz Barrett – art direction
- Albert Sanchez – photography
- Sharon Gault – hair, make-up
- Steve Barlevi – management
- David A. Helfant – management
