= Conner Reeves =

English singer and songwriter (born 1972)

- Born: 8 April 1972 (age 54); London, England
- Genres: Blue-eyed soul
- Occupations: Singer, songwriter
- Years active: 1997–present
- Website: www.connerreeves.com

Conner Reeves (born 8 April 1972) is an English singer and songwriter. He is best known for his 1997 album Earthbound which was released on Colin Lester's and Ian McAndrew's Wildstar label.

Reeves scored five consecutive Top 40 singles in the UK Singles Chart and provided backing vocals to MN8's hit song "If You Only Let Me In" which he also co-wrote. He gave his song "As Love Is My Witness" to the Irish pop band Westlife for their album Where We Are.

In November 2005, he released the EP Welcome to the Future through Still Waters Recordings.

On 17 March 2007, a song he wrote titled "I Can", performed by former East 17 singer Brian Harvey, participated in the United Kingdom's national selection for the Eurovision Song Contest. He co-wrote the tracks "Mouth to Mouth" and "Porcelain" with X Factor winner Matt Cardle on his 2013 album Porcelain, as well as being credited with backing vocals and keyboards.

In an interview with Headliner Magazine in 2019, he stated that he had retired to become a "proper father" and that he intended to release new music.

In 2025, he released his first single in more than 20 years, "Bones", followed by his second album, arriving 27 years after his first, called Ten Thousand Days & The Church Of The Restoration.

== Discography ==
=== Albums ===
- Earthbound (November 1997): – UK No. 25
- Ten Thousand Days & The Church Of The Restoration (August 2025)

=== Singles ===
- "My Father's Son" (18 August 1997) UK No. 12
- "Earthbound" (10 November 1997)– UK No. 14
- "Read My Mind" (30 March 1998)– UK No. 19 written with Wayne Cohen
- "Searching for a Soul" (21 September 1998) – UK No. 28
- "Best Friend" (with Mark Morrison) (23 August 1999) – UK No. 23
- "Welcome to the Future" (28 November 2005) (3-track EP)
- "Joy" (20 August 2007)
- "Love Lead Me On" (23 August 2019)
- "My Father's Son (Live at the Bedford)" (30 August 2019)
- "Bones" / "The Sweetest Invasion" (June 2025)
- "Skin In The Game"/"Tell These Arms" (August 2025)

=== As composer ===
With Joss Stone

- Mind Body & Soul (2004)
- Colour Me Free! (2009)
