= Curtis Stigers (album) =

Studio album by Curtis Stigers
- Released: September 24, 1991
- Recorded: 1991
- Studios: Studio Ultimo, The Village Recorder and Westlake Audio (Los Angeles, California); Ocean Way Studios, A&M Studios and Capitol Studios (Hollywood, California)
- Genres: Soul; jazz; soft rock
- Length: 45:37
- Labels: Arista; 261953
- Producers: Glen Ballard; Danny Kortchmar

Curtis Stigers chronology
| Curtis Stigers (1991) | Time Was (1996) |

Singles from Curtis Stigers
- 1. "I Wonder Why" Released: August 12, 1991; 2. "You're All That Matters to Me" Released: January 17, 1992; 3. "Sleeping with the Lights On" Released: April 30, 1992; 4. "Never Saw a Miracle" Released: August 17, 1992

Professional ratings
Review scores
| Source | Rating |
|---|---|
| AllMusic | 3/5 stars |

Curtis Stigers is the debut album by American jazz musician Curtis Stigers, released on 24 September 1991 by Arista Records. It includes the hit singles "I Wonder Why", "You're All That Matters to Me", and "Never Saw a Miracle". The album peaked at number seven on the UK Albums Chart in 1992.

== Track listing ==
| No. | Title | Writer(s) | Producer(s) | Length |
|---|---|---|---|---|
| 1. | "Sleeping with the Lights On" | Curtis Stigers; Wayne Cohen | Danny Kortchmar | 4:03 |
| 2. | "I Wonder Why" | Stigers; Glen Ballard | Glen Ballard | 4:28 |
| 3. | "You're All That Matters to Me" | Stigers; Gregg Sutton; Shelly Peiken | Ballard | 4:40 |
| 4. | "The Man You're Gonna Fall in Love With" | Stigers; Cohen | Kortchmar | 4:26 |
| 5. | "People Like Us" | Stigers; Ballard | Ballard | 4:36 |
| 6. | "Never Saw a Miracle" | Stigers; Barry Mann | Ballard | 3:43 |
| 7. | "I Guess It Wasn't Mine" | Sutton; Peiken | Ballard | 3:57 |
| 8. | "Nobody Loves You Like I Do" | Stigers; Cohen | Ballard | 4:04 |
| 9. | "I Keep Telling Myself" | Albert Hammond; Mark E. Nevin | Kortchmar | 3:56 |
| 10. | "Count My Blessings" | Stigers; Cohen | Ballard | 4:22 |
| 11. | "The Last Time I Said Goodbye" | Stigers; Cohen | Kortchmar | 3:41 |
| Total length: | | | | 45:37 |

== Personnel ==
Musicians

- Curtis Stigers – lead vocals, backing vocals (1, 3–5, 8–10), tenor saxophone (1, 7, 11), alto saxophone (2, 10)
- David Paich – keyboards (1, 4, 9, 11)
- Randy Kerber – keyboards (2, 3, 5–8, 10), acoustic piano (2, 3, 5–8, 10)
- Glen Ballard – additional keyboards (2, 3, 5–7, 10)
- Bill Payne – organ (2, 3, 5–7, 10)
- Danny Kortchmar – guitars (1, 4, 9)
- Michael Landau – guitars, guitar solo (5)
- Buzz Feiten – guitars (2, 3, 5, 6, 10)
- Basil Fung – guitars (2, 3, 5)
- Michael Thompson – guitars (8)
- T. M. Stevens – bass (1, 4, 9, 11)
- Abraham Laboriel – bass (2, 3, 5–8, 10)
- Neil Stubenhaus – additional bass (5)
- Jeff Porcaro – drums (1, 4, 9, 11)
- John Robinson – drums (2, 3, 5–7, 10)
- Mike Baird – drums (8)
- Paulinho da Costa – percussion (3, 5–7, 10)
- Brandon Fields – saxophones (3)
- Kim Hutchcroft – saxophones (3)
- Gary Grant – trumpet (3)
- Jerry Hey – trumpet (3)
- Angel Rogers – backing vocals (2, 3, 7, 10)
- Alfie Silas – backing vocals (2, 6, 7)
- Tata Vega – backing vocals (2, 3, 7, 10),
- Siedah Garrett – backing vocals (3, 10)
- Alexandria Brown – backing vocals (4, 9)
- Pattie Brooks – backing vocals (4, 9)
- Sally Taylor – backing vocals (4, 9)
- Rose Banks – backing vocals (6)
- Andraé Crouch – backing vocals (6)
- Sandra Crouch – backing vocals (6)
- Geary Lanier Faggett – backing vocals (6)
- Jackie Gouche – backing vocals (6)
- Pattie Howard – backing vocals (6)
- Howard McCrary – backing vocals (6)
- Perry Morgan – backing vocals (6)

Music arrangements

- Jerry Hey – arrangements (1, 4, 9, 11), horn arrangements (3)
- Glen Ballard – arrangements (2, 3, 5–8, 10)

String sections (Tracks 2, 3, 9 & 11)

- Jerry Hey – string arrangements
- Richard Altenbach, Reg Hill, Paula Hochhalter, Lisa Johnson, Roland Kato, Carole Kleister-Castillo, Rene Mandel, Ralph Morrison, Helen Nightingale and Frederick Seykora – strings (2, 3)
- Christine Ermacoff, Ronald Folsom, Carrie Holzman-Little, Lisa Johnson, Karen Jones, Roland Kato, Michael Markman, Ralph Morrison, Sheldon Sanov, Frederick Seykora, Margaret Wooten and Kenneth Yerks – strings (9, 11)

== Production ==
- Danny Kortchmar – producer (1, 4, 9, 11)
- Glen Ballard – producer (2, 3, 5–8, 10)
- Jolie Levine – production coordinator (2, 3, 5–8, 10)
- Doug Dana – music chart preparation (1, 4, 9, 11)
- Orion Crawford – music chart preparation (2, 3, 5–8, 10)
- Maude Gilman – art direction, design
- Amy Finkle – art coordinator
- Richard Corman – photography
- C. Winston Simone Management – management

Technical credits

- Bernie Grundman – mastering at Bernie Grundman Mastering (Hollywood, California)
- Rob Jacobs – recording (1, 4, 9, 11), mixing (1, 4, 9, 11)
- Nick DeDia – mixing (1, 4, 9, 11), assistant engineer (1, 4, 9, 11)
- Glen Ballard – mixing (2, 3, 5–8, 10)
- Francis Buckley – recording (2, 3, 5–8, 10), mixing (2, 3, 5–8, 10)
- Greg Loskorn – technical advisor (2, 3, 5–8, 10)
- Tom Biener – technical director for tracking and overdubs (2, 3, 5–8, 10)
- Rail Rogut – assistant engineer (1, 4, 9, 11)
- Marty Brumbach – mix assistant (1, 4, 9, 11)
- Greg Goldman – mix assistant (1, 4, 9, 11)
- Barry Rudolph – additional recording (2, 3, 5–8, 10)
- Peter Doell – assistant engineer (2, 3, 5–8, 10)
- Rob Hart – assistant engineer (2, 3, 5–8, 10)
- Brad Aldredge – mix assistant (2, 3, 5–8, 10)
- Greg Fogel – mix assistant (2, 3, 5–8, 10)
- Mark Hagen – mix assistant (2, 3, 5–8, 10)
- Leslie Ann Jones – mix assistant (2, 3, 5–8, 10)
- Gavin Menzies – guitar technician (1, 4, 9, 11)

== Charts ==
=== Weekly charts ===
Weekly chart performance for Curtis Stigers
| Chart (1992) | Peak position |
|---|---|
| Australian Albums (ARIA) | 84 |
| Austrian Albums (Ö3 Austria) | 3 |
| Dutch Albums (Album Top 100) | 27 |
| German Albums (Offizielle Top 100) | 5 |
| Swedish Albums (Sverigetopplistan) | 24 |
| Swiss Albums (Schweizer Hitparade) | 10 |
| UK Albums (Official Charts) | 7 |
| US Billboard 200 | 101 |

=== Year-end charts ===
Year-end chart performance for Curtis Stigers
| Chart (1992) | Position |
|---|---|
| German Albums (Offizielle Top 100) | 37 |
