= Jennifer Love Hewitt (album) =

Studio album by Jennifer Love Hewitt
- Released: September 3, 1996
- Recorded: 1995–1996
- Genre: Pop; R&B
- Length: 47:49
- Label: Atlantic
- Producer: Wayne Cohen; Skip Drinkwater; Joel Kipnis; Howard McCrary; Robert Palmer; Dick Rudolph; Michael Sembello

Jennifer Love Hewitt chronology
Let's Go Bang (1995)	Jennifer Love Hewitt (1996)	BareNaked (2002)

Singles from Jennifer Love Hewitt
- 1. "Cool with You" Released: July 9, 1996; 2. "No Ordinary Love" Released: October 14, 1996; 3. "I Believe In..." Released: April 9, 1997

Professional ratings
Review scores
Source	Rating
AllMusic	link

Jennifer Love Hewitt is the third studio album by actress and recording artist Jennifer Love Hewitt. It was released on September 3, 1996, by Atlantic Records.

== Track listing ==
No.	Title	Writer(s)	Length
1.	"Cool with You"	Joleen Belle, Robert Palmer	3:15
2.	"No Ordinary Love"	Deborah Cox, Stephens	4:05
3.	"(Our Love) Don't Throw It All Away"	Barry Gibb, Derek Weaver	3:58
4.	"Never a Day Goes By"	Wayne Cohen	4:12
5.	"Don't Push the River"	Wayne Cohen, Billy Mann	3:37
6.	"The Greatest Word"	Wayne Cohen, Conner Reeves	4:15
7.	"I Want a Love I Can See"	Smokey Robinson	3:50
8.	"I Always Was Your Girl"	Tracey Thorn, Ben Watt	4:32
9.	"Last Night"	Wayne Cohen, Peter Zizzo	4:17
10.	"I Believe In..."	David Bryant, Fran Lucci, Dara Stewart	4:33
11.	"Never a Day Goes By" (Acoustic version)	Wayne Cohen	4:13
12.	"It's Good to Know I'm Alive"	Dick Rudolph, Michael Sembello	3:02

== Personnel ==
=== Musicians ===
- Jennifer Love Hewitt – vocals, backing vocals (2, 3, 8)
- Howard McCrary – keyboards (1, 7), vocal arrangements (1, 7)
- David Flemming – keyboards (2, 3, 8), drum programming (2, 3, 8), rhythm arrangements (2, 3, 8)
- Wayne Cohen – keyboards (4–6, 9, 11), programming (4–6, 9, 11), acoustic guitar (4–6, 9, 11), electric guitar (4–6, 9, 11), backing vocals (4), bass guitar (5), original track and vocal programming (9)
- Dave Clinton – keyboard programming (4–6, 9, 11)
- Peter Zizzo – original track and vocal programming (9)
- John Avarese – synthesizers (10)
- Michael Sembello – programming (12), guitars (12), backing vocals (12)
- Charles Fearing – rhythm guitar (1, 7)
- Joel Kipnis – acoustic guitar (2, 3, 8), electric guitar (2, 3, 8), vocal arrangements (2, 3, 8)
- Ira Siegel – acoustic guitar (4–6, 9, 11), electric guitar (4–6, 9, 11), nylon guitar (4–6, 9, 12)
- Eric Bazilian – guitars (10)
- Danny Powers – guitars (10)
- Alex Al – bass guitar (1)
- Paul Adamy – bass guitar (2, 3, 8)
- Melvin Davis – bass guitar (7)
- Robert Palmer – drum programming (1, 7), vocal arrangements (1, 7), wah-wah guitar (7)
- Jimmy Greco – drum programming (4–6, 9, 11)
- Doug Grigsby – drums (10)
- Larry Loftin – vocal arrangements (4, 11)
- Billy Mann – vocal arrangements (5)
- Conner Reeves – vocal arrangements (6)
- Valerie Davis – backing vocals (1, 4–6, 9, 11), vocal arrangements (1, 4–7, 9, 11)
- Sharice Davis – backing vocals (2, 3, 8)
- Fran Lucci – backing vocals (10)

=== Production ===
- Rich Christina – executive producer, A&R
- John Raso – executive producer
- Howard McCrary – producer (1, 7)
- Robert Palmer – producer (1, 7)
- Joel Kipnis – producer (2, 3, 8)
- Wayne Cohen – producer (4–6, 9, 11)
- Skip Drinkwater – producer (10), mixing (10)
- Dick Rudolph – producer (12)
- Michael Sembello – producer (12)
- Chris Roberts – recording (1, 7), mixing (1, 7)
- David Flemming – recording (2, 3, 8), mixing (2, 3, 8)
- Brad Davis – recording (4–6, 9, 11), mixing (4–6, 9, 11), project coordinator (4–6, 9, 11)
- Robert Mitchell – recording (4–6, 9, 11)
- Joe Alexander – recording (10), mixing (10)
- Chris Papastephanou – engineer (12)
- Tony Meador – assistant engineer (1, 7)
- Stephanie Gylden – mix assistant (1, 7)
- Brad Catlett – assistant engineer (10)
- Greg Mull – additional engineer (10)
- Rick Essig – mastering at Frankford/Wayne Mastering Labs (Philadelphia, Pennsylvania)
- Rich Davis – project coordinator (4–6, 9, 11)
- Elizabeth Barrett – art direction, design
- Diego Uchitel – photography
- David A. Helfant – management
