= BareNaked =

Studio album by Jennifer Love Hewitt
- Released: October 8, 2002
- Length: 44:44
- Label: Jive
- Producers: Meredith Brooks; Gregg Alexander

Jennifer Love Hewitt chronology
Jennifer Love Hewitt (1996)	BareNaked (2002)	Cool With You: The Platinum Collection (2006)

Singles from BareNaked
- 1. "BareNaked" Released: July 8, 2002; 2. "Can I Go Now" Released: January 13, 2003

Professional ratings
Aggregate scores
Source	Rating
Metacritic	47/100
Review scores
Source	Rating
AllMusic	4.5/5 stars
Blender	2/5 stars
E!	D
Entertainment Weekly	D+
Q	4/5 stars
Rolling Stone	2/5 stars
Slant Magazine	2/5 stars

BareNaked is the fourth studio album by actress and recording artist Jennifer Love Hewitt. It was released on October 8, 2002. The album became her most successful album to date, reaching the top 40 at no. 37 on the Billboard 200, making it her first album to appear on that chart. BareNaked spawned two singles, "BareNaked" and "Can I Go Now", and included a remake of Kris Kristofferson's "Me and Bobby McGee". The UK and Japanese editions of the album came with a bonus track called "Just Try", previously released as the B-side to "Can I Go Now".

== Track listing ==
BareNaked track listing
No.	Title	Writer(s)	Length
1.	"BareNaked"	Jennifer Love Hewitt, Meredith Brooks, Guy Erez, Emerson Swinford	3:42
2.	"Can I Go Now"	Brooks, Livingstone Brown, Mike Stevens	3:36
3.	"You"	Hewitt, Brooks	3:41
4.	"Hey Everybody"	Hewitt, Brooks, Brown	4:07
5.	"Where You Gonna Run To?"	Hewitt, Brooks, Paul Goldo	3:33
6.	"I Know You Will"	Hewitt, Brooks, David Darling	3:18
7.	"Rock the Roll"	Hewitt, Brooks, Goldo	3:44
8.	"Stand in Your Way"	Brooks, Brown, Shelly Peiken	4:13
9.	"First Time"	Brooks, Guy Erez, Goldo, Swinford	3:49
10.	"Stronger"	Hewitt	3:21
11.	"Avenue of the Stars"	Hewitt, Brooks, Andy Goldmark, Scot Sax	4:06
12.	"Me and Bobby McGee"	Fred Foster, Kris Kristofferson	3:34

UK and Japanese bonus track
No.	Title	Writer(s)	Length
13.	"Just Try"	Brooks, Brian McKnight	3:44

== Personnel ==
=== Musicians ===
- Jennifer Love Hewitt – vocals, backing vocals
- Livingstone Brown – keyboards (1–5, 8), bass (1–5, 7, 8, 10, 11), programming (2, 3), acoustic guitar (2), additional programming (4, 8), Jamaican voice (6)
- Paul "Goldo" Goldowitz – keyboards (1, 5), programming (1, 5, 7, 9), guy vocals (7)
- Michael Parnell – keyboards (1)
- Alex Greggs – additional programming (2)
- Paul Lindemulder – acoustic piano (3)
- Meredith Brooks – electric guitar (1, 2, 4, 5), acoustic guitar (2, 4), backing vocals (2, 4, 9), guitars (3, 6–11)
- Emerson Swinford – acoustic guitar (1, 5), guitars (9)
- Dave Darling – additional guitars (4), programming (6), guitars (6), bass (6)
- Dustin Boyer – guitars (7, 11), bridge arrangements (7)
- Glen Holmen – bass (9)
- Abe Laboriel Jr. – drums (1–3, 5)
- Russ Miller – drums (4, 6–11), programming (4, 10, 11), strings (10)
- Andrew Boston – DJ (5)
- Chris Canute – original arrangements (10), hand drums (12)
- Windy Wagner – backing vocals (3, 5, 8, 11)
- Rochelle Gillard – backing vocals (4, 6)
- Sharon Perry – backing vocals (4, 6, 10)
- Rose Stone – backing vocals (4, 6)
- Carolyn Perry – backing vocals (10)
- Darlene Perry – backing vocals (10)

=== Production ===
- Meredith Brooks – producer, recording (1–11), Pro Tools editing (1–5, 7–11), mixing (4)
- Gregg Alexander – co-producer
- Jeff Peters – recording (1, 3, 4, 8)
- David N. Cole – recording (2, 5)
- Phil Kaffel – recording (4, 6, 7, 10–12)
- Dave Darling – recording (6)
- Goldo – recording (9), Pro Tools editing (9)
- Brad Haehnel – mixing (1, 3, 5–12), recording (9)
- Rich Travali – mixing (2)
- Livingstone Brown – mixing (4)
- Joseph Lobato – mix assistant (1, 3, 5–12), Pro Tools editing (4, 8)
- Rich Tapper – mix assistant (2)
- Jody Nachtigal – mix assistant (4), production coordinator
- Michael Parnell – Pro Tools editing (1, 3)
- Seth McLain – Pro Tools editing (2, 5)
- Jon Kruff – Pro Tools editing (10)
- Andy Goldmark – additional digital editing (1, 4)
- Peter Karr – additional digital editing (1, 4)
- Chaz Harper – mastering at Battery Studios (New York, NY)
- Nick Gamma – art direction, design
- Jackie Murphy – art direction, design
- Anthony Mandler – photography
- Agostina Lombardo – make-up
- Robert Steinkin – hair
- Rachel Rosenzweig – stylist
- David Guillod – management
- Jeff Norskog – management

== Commercial performance ==
Barenaked was Hewitt's first album to chart in the United States and has sold 101,000 copies in the US to date.

== Chart performance ==
=== Album ===
Chart performance for BareNaked
Chart (2002)	Peak position
Australian Albums (ARIA)	31
Canadian Albums (Nielsen SoundScan)	45
Dutch Albums (Album Top 100)	72
German Albums (Offizielle Top 100)	75
US Billboard 200	37

=== Singles ===
Chart performance for singles from BareNaked
Year	Title	Peak chart positions				
Year	Title	AUS	NZ	NL	US	US Adult
2002	"BareNaked"	6	26	73	124	31
2003	"Can I Go Now"	12	—	8	—	—
"—" denotes the single did not chart
