= BareNaked (song) =

2002 single by Jennifer Love Hewitt

Single by Jennifer Love Hewitt

from the album BareNaked
- B-side: "First Time"; "Rock the Roll"
- Released: July 8, 2002
- Length: 3:42 (album version); 3:19 (radio version)
- Label: Jive
- Songwriters: Meredith Brooks; Guy Erez; Paul Goldowitz; Jennifer Love Hewitt; Emerson Swinford
- Producer: Meredith Brooks

Jennifer Love Hewitt singles chronology
"How Do I Deal" (1999)	"BareNaked" (2002)	"Can I Go Now" (2003)

Music video
- "BareNaked" on YouTube

"BareNaked" is the first single from American actress Jennifer Love Hewitt's fourth studio album, BareNaked (2002).The single peaked at No. 6 in Australia, No. 24 on the US Billboard Bubbling Under Hot 100 chart, and No. 26 in New Zealand.

== Commercial performance ==
In the United States, "BareNaked" debuted at its peak of number 24 on the Billboard Bubbling Under Hot 100 chart, spending only one week on the chart. On the Billboard Adult Pop Songs chart, it peaked at number 31 and spent 10 weeks on the chart. "BareNaked" also reached number 35 on the Billboard Mainstream Top 40 chart and spent six weeks on the chart.

In Australia, "BareNaked" debuted at number 18 on the ARIA Singles Chart. After four weeks, it climbed into the top 10 and peaked at number six, remaining in the top 50 for 11 weeks. In New Zealand, the song reached number 26 and spent 13 weeks on the RIANZ Singles Chart. In Netherlands, the song peaked at number 73 and spent 10 weeks on the chart, while in the Flanders region of Belgium, "BareNaked" reached number six on the Ultratip Bubbling Under chart.

== Track listings ==
Australian CD single

1. "BareNaked" (radio version) – 3:19
2. "BareNaked" (album version) – 3:41
3. "First Time" (album version) – 3:48
4. "Rock the Roll" (album version) – 3:43

European CD single

1. "BareNaked" (CD Pro version)
2. "BareNaked" (album version)

== Charts ==
=== Weekly charts ===
Chart (2002–2003)	Peak position
Australia (ARIA)	6
Belgium (Ultratip Bubbling Under Flanders)	6
Netherlands (Dutch Top 40)	33
Netherlands (Single Top 100)	73
New Zealand (Recorded Music NZ)	26
US Bubbling Under Hot 100 (Billboard)	24
US Adult Pop Airplay (Billboard)	31
US Pop Airplay (Billboard)	35

=== Year-end charts ===
Chart (2002)	Position
Australia (ARIA)	68

== Release history ==
Region	Date	Format	Label	Ref.
United States	July 8, 2002	Hot adult contemporary radio	Jive	
United States	July 29, 2002	Contemporary hit radio	Jive	
Australia	September 2, 2002	CD	Jive	
