= Love Songs (Jennifer Love Hewitt album) =

Studio album by Jennifer Love Hewitt
- Released: March 21, 1992
- Recorded: 1991–1992
- Length: 41:21
- Label: Meldac, Nippon Crown; MECP-28003
- Producer: Rod Antoon; Bob Etoll; Greg Poree; Jeffrey Weber

Jennifer Love Hewitt chronology
Love Songs (1992)	Let's Go Bang (1995)

Singles from Love Songs
- 1. "Dancing Queen" Released: June 21, 1991; 2. "What's It Gonna Take" Released: November 1991; 3. "Please Save Us the World" Released: 1992

Professional ratings
Review scores
Source	Rating
AllMusic	2/5 stars

Love Songs is the debut studio album by actress and recording artist Jennifer Love Hewitt, released only in Japan on March 21, 1992 by Meldac and distributed by Nippon Crown.

== Background ==
Jennifer Love Hewitt recorded a cover version of the Blondie song "Heart of Glass" as a single for release only in Japan. However, that song was not included in the final track list for this album. Production of Love Songs began in 1991. The first single released from the album was a cover of the ABBA song "Dancing Queen", on June 21, 1991. The second single, "What's It Gonna Take" which features a rap verse by Hewitt, was released that November. The third and final single, "Please Save Us the World", was released in 1992. A music video for "Please Save Us the World" was made as part of a United Nations charity effort.

== Track listing ==
No.	Title	Writer(s)	Length
1.	"First Taste of Love"	Carroll, Bob Etoll, Stober	3:55
2.	"Bedtime Stories"	Etoll, Debbie Gibson	3:55
3.	"Please Save Us the World"	Casgrove	3:34
4.	"Won't U B Mine"	Etoll	4:37
5.	"Listen (To Your Heart)"	Etoll, Roberts	3:41
6.	"90s Kids"	Grenga, Love, McLaughlin	4:41
7.	"I'll Find You"	Etoll	3:37
8.	"Dancing Queen" (ABBA cover)	Björn Ulvaeus, Benny Andersson, Stig Anderson	3:59
9.	"What's It Gonna Take"	Margolis, Mellman	3:27
10.	"A Little Jazz"	Andrews, Derek Young	3:13
11.	"Ben" (Michael Jackson cover)	Walter Scharf, Don Black	2:42

== Personnel ==
- Jennifer Love Hewitt – vocals, background vocals
- Rod Antoon – drums, keyboard
- Leon "Ndugu" Chancler – drums
- Brad Cole – keyboard
- Liz Constantine – background vocals
- N'Dea Davenport – background vocals
- Jerry Deaton – drums
- Joel Derouin – violin, concert master
- Bruce Dukov – violin
- Bob Etoll – guitar, drums
- Charles Everett – violin
- Armen Garabedian – violin
- Berj Garabedian – violin
- Seth Gilstrap – baritone saxophone
- Herbert Hoover;- alto saxophone
- Gary Herbig – saxophone
- Suzie Katayama – conductor
- Peter Kent – violin
- Rob Lorentz – violin
- Jim Altman - baritone ukulele
- Christian Rollman – keyboard and background vocals
- Dave Marotta – bass
- Quincy McCrary – background vocals
- Kelly Parkinson – violin
- Starr Parodi – keyboard
- Greg Poree – acoustic guitar
- Sheldon Reynolds – guitar
- Steve Richards – cello
- Wolfgang Schmid – bass
- Daniel Smith – cello
- Jana Sorenson – background vocals
- Ralph Stemmann – synclavier
- Chad Wackerman – drums
- John Wheelock – electric guitar
- Fred White – background vocals
- Ed Willett – cello
- Herschel Wise – viola
- John Yoakum – oboe
- Derek J. Young – background vocals
- Nate White – handpan and didgeridoo

=== Production ===
- Producers: Rod Antoon, Bob Etoll, Greg Poree, Jeffrey Weber
- Engineer: Wolfgang Aichholz, John Baker, Vincent Cirilli, Walter Clissen, Clark Germain, Khaliq Glover, Mike McDonald
- Mixing: Walter Clissen, Harry Maslin
- Mixing assistant: Matt Pakucko
- Sound technician: Ralph Stemmann
- Keyboard programming: Rod Antoon, Brad Cole, Jerry Deaton, Bob Etoll
- Arrangers: Rod Antoon, Brad Cole, Jerry Deaton, Bob Etoll, Greg Poree, Jeffrey Weber
- String arrangements: Suzie Katayama
