= 1995 in music =

This is a list of notable events in music that took place in the year 1995.

== Specific locations ==
- 1995 in British music
- 1995 in Norwegian music
- 1995 in Scandinavian music
- 1995 in South Korean music

== Specific genres ==
- 1995 in classical music
- 1995 in country music
- 1995 in heavy metal music
- 1995 in hip-hop
- 1995 in jazz
- 1995 in Latin music
- 1995 in progressive rock

== Events ==
=== January–February ===
- January 1 – Mo Ostin steps down as chairman and CEO of Warner Music Group.
- January 8 – Pearl Jam frontman Eddie Vedder hosts "Self-Pollution Radio", a four-and-a-half hour radio broadcast with live performances by Pearl Jam, Soundgarden, Mudhoney, and others. Any station with a satellite receiver could pick up and carry the program.
- January 10 – Michel Sardou begins a record-breaking run of 113 shows at the Paris Olympia.
- January 14 – Perry Farrell is arrested for cocaine possession, being under the influence and possession of a syringe at a Los Angeles hotel.
- January 18 – Jerry Garcia crashes his rented BMW into a guard rail near Mill Valley, California, USA, but is not injured in the accident.
- January 20–February 5 – The Big Day Out festival takes place in Australia and New Zealand, headlined by Ministry, Primal Scream, Hole, The Cult and The Offspring. Originally, Oasis were also named in the lineup, but had to cancel their performance due to co-frontman Liam Gallagher losing his voice.
- January 27 – Live from the House of Blues premieres on TBS.
- February 1 – Welsh rock band Manic Street Preachers band member Richey James Edwards goes missing after leaving the London Embassy Hotel, UK at 7 am.
- February 7 – Rapper Tupac Shakur is sentenced to one-and-a-half to four-and-a-half years in prison on a sexual abuse charge. He is later released on appeal.
- February 12 – Iron Butterfly bassist Philip Taylor Kramer disappears from Highway 101, USA as he tried to get back home from the Los Angeles International Airport. He tried calling his family and 911 for help, but received none. His remains are found in 1999.
- February 14 – Richey Edwards' Vauxhall Cavalier is found abandoned in a service station on the Bristol side of the Severn Bridge in the UK, with evidence that he had been living in it. Although he was near a notorious suicide spot, there is still no evidence to suggest he committed suicide.
- February 19
  - Roxette play to a crowd of 12,000 in Beijing, China, becoming the first Western band to be allowed to perform in the Workers' Indoor Arena for ten years.
  - Mötley Crüe drummer Tommy Lee marries Baywatch actress Pamela Anderson on a beach in Cancún, Mexico.
- February 25 – Lyle Lovett suffers a broken collarbone in an accident while riding his motorcycle in Mexico. The accident prevented Lovett from attending the Grammy Awards (he ended up winning two awards).
- February 27 – Bruce Springsteen's Greatest Hits is released, featuring four new songs recorded with a temporarily reunited E Street Band.
- February 28 – Traci Lords releases their debut studio album 1000 Fires.

=== March–April ===
- March 1
  - R.E.M. drummer Bill Berry leaves the stage during a concert in Switzerland after suffering a brain aneurysm. He undergoes successful brain surgery two days later in Switzerland.
  - The 37th Annual Grammy Awards are presented in Los Angeles, hosted by Paul Reiser. Bruce Springsteen won four awards, including Song of the Year for "Streets of Philadelphia", while Tony Bennett's MTV Unplugged live album wins Album of the Year and Sheryl Crow's "All I Wanna Do" wins Record of the Year. Crow also wins Best New Artist.
- March 8 – Former Helloween drummer, Ingo Schwichtenberg, commits suicide by jumping under a subway train.
- March 13 – Radiohead album The Bends and Elastica album Elastica are released.
- March 14 – With the release of Me Against the World, Tupac Shakur became the first male solo artist to have a number one album on the American Billboard 200 chart while in prison. The album remained at the top of the charts for four weeks.
- March 25 – The Cult perform its last show in Rio de Janeiro Brazil, with Ian Astbury leaving the band. The Cult would reunite in April 1999.
- March 26 – Rapper Eric Lynn Wright, better known as Eazy-E, dies of complications from AIDS.
- March 28 – Lyle Lovett and actress Julia Roberts announce their separation after 21 months of marriage.
- March 30 – Celine Dion releases D'eux, which goes on to be the most successful French-language album of all time.
- March 31
  - Tejano singer Selena is shot and killed by Yolanda Saldivar, her former personal assistant and former fan club president, who had recently been fired for embezzling money from the fan club. The event was called "Black Friday" by Hispanics worldwide.
  - During a performance in Auburn Hills, Michigan, USA, Jimmy Page narrowly escapes being stabbed by a man who rushes the stage with a knife. The man was tackled by security guards who were injured in the brawl.
- April 17 – Ed Rosenblatt replaces David Geffen as chairman and CEO of Geffen Records.
- April 22 – Janet Jackson ends her Janet World Tour in London, England after nearly two years of touring.
- April 29 – Tupac Shakur marries Keisha Morris inside the Clinton Correctional Facility, New York, USA. Shakur was serving a four-and-a-half year jail term on sexual assault charges. They would later divorce.

=== May–June ===
- May 5 – Former Guns N' Roses drummer Steven Adler is arraigned on a felony count of possession of heroin, in addition to two misdemeanor drug charges.
- May 13 – The 40th Eurovision Song Contest, held at Point Theatre in Dublin, Ireland, is won by Irish-Norwegian band Secret Garden, representing Norway with the song "Nocturne". This is the last competition with only one host until 2013.
- May 15 – Stone Temple Pilots singer Scott Weiland is arrested outside a motel in Pasadena, California, for possession of heroin and cocaine.
- May 19 – Sam Phillips makes her motion picture debut in the Bruce Willis action film, Die Hard with a Vengeance. Phillips plays one of the main terrorists in the film.
- June 1 – Alan Wilder leaves Depeche Mode.
- June 13 – Icelandic singer Björk releases Post, her critically acclaimed second album as a solo artist. The musically diverse album contained some of her most popular work to date, including "Army of Me", "Hyperballad", "I Miss You" and a Betty Hutton cover of "It's Oh So Quiet".
- June 20 – Michael Jackson released his first double-album HIStory, which became the best-selling multiple-album of all time, with 35 million copies (70 million copies) sold worldwide.

=== July–August ===
- July 3 – The members of TLC file for Chapter 11 bankruptcy, declaring debts of over $3.5 million.
- July 9 – The Grateful Dead performs its final show with Jerry Garcia at Soldier Field in Chicago. He dies one month later of a heart attack at the age of 53.
- July 14 – George Michael and Sony Music complete their acrimonious split. In 1994 Michael lost a lawsuit seeking to be released from his Sony contract, but he vowed to never sing for the company again. Michael will now record for the new label DreamWorks Records.
- July 17 – Robbie Williams announces he is leaving Take That.
- July 18 – Selena becomes the first Hispanic singer to have an album debut and peak at number-one on the US Billboard 200 chart. She also becomes the first and only female singer to place five albums simultaneously on the Billboard 200 chart.
- August 9
  - Jerry Garcia of Grateful Dead passes away of a heart attack at age 53. In cities all over the United States, deadheads spontaneously gather to mourn his death and celebrate his life.
  - Kiss performs on MTV Unplugged. The band's current lineup is joined by original members Peter Criss and Ace Frehley, setting the stage for the band's reunion tour the following year.
- August 12 – The Offspring's Dexter Holland marries hairstylist Kristine Luna, who co-wrote the band's song "Session" from Ignition.
- August 22 – Rancid release their third studio album ...And Out Come the Wolves. Along with Green Day's Dookie and The Offspring's Smash (both released a year before), this album helped revive mainstream popular interest in punk rock in the mid-1990s, and becomes one of the best-selling independent records of all time. ...And Out Come the Wolves eventually goes platinum.
- August 23 – Dwayne Goettel of Skinny Puppy dies of a heroin overdose at his parents' home in Edmonton, Alberta, Canada.
- August 28
  - Oingo Boingo announce that they will break up following a series of Halloween shows in Los Angeles, California, USA. Lead singer Danny Elfman has established a career scoring motion pictures.
  - The official end of Sarah Records is marked with a farewell party featuring live sets by many of the label's acts. It was the last live appearance by The Orchids before they split up.
- August 29 – Al Jourgensen and Mike Scaccia of Ministry are arrested for heroin possession in two separate incidents in Texas.

=== September–October ===
- September 1 – The Rock and Roll Hall of Fame opens in Cleveland, Ohio, USA.
- September 5 – The Luminiş Villa, George Enescu Memorial House, becomes an official memorial to the composer.
- September 5 – The Backstreet Boys release their debut single "We've Got It Goin' On".
- September 8 – For Squirrels vocalist Jack Vigliatura, bassist Bill White and manager Tim Bender are all killed in a van accident near Savannah, Georgia.
- September 15 – Alternative-country magazine No Depression publishes its first issue, with Son Volt on the cover.
- September 27 – Time Warner agrees to sell back its 50 percent share of Interscope Records. The media giant had come under intense fire for the explicit lyrics of rap artists on the label.
- October 2
  - The first International Guitar Festival is held in Buenos Aires, Argentina.
  - Oasis release their second album, (What's the Story) Morning Glory?. The album spawns several number one singles around the world and eventually becomes the third best-selling album in the UK of all time.
- October 10
  - Mariah Carey performs at Madison Square Garden to promote her album Daydream.
  - Green Day release their fourth album Insomniac. While it did not sell as well as their previous album Dookie, it still sold 4 million copies.
- October 11 – Tupac Shakur is released from Clinton Correctional Facility, New York, USA, on US$1.4 million bail which was posted by Suge Knight. In return, Tupac signed a three-album deal with Knight's Death Row Records.
- October 21 – Blind Melon singer Shannon Hoon is found dead of a cocaine overdose at the age of 28.
- October 23 – Def Leppard enters the Guinness Book of World Records by performing three shows in three continents in the same day, playing Tangier, Morocco, London, England and Vancouver, British Columbia, Canada.
- October 24 – The Smashing Pumpkins release their album Mellon Collie and the Infinite Sadness.
- October 30 – Oasis release their single "Wonderwall".

=== November–December ===
- November 6
  - Cher releases her first album in four years, It's A Man's World, her first original recording for Warner Music Group. The album would get its U.S. debut in June 1996.
  - Queen releases their final studio album that includes contributions from all original members following Freddie Mercury's death four years earlier. It goes on to be a huge success, selling 20 million copies worldwide.
- November 11 – The 24th OTI Festival, held at Anfiteatro José Asunción Flores in San Bernardino, Paraguay, is won by the song "Eres mi debilidad", written by Alejandro Abad, and performed by Marcos Llunas representing Spain.
- November 21
  - dc Talk release their 4th studio album Jesus Freak. It was a departure from their previous hip hop albums taking on a rap rock sound. It achieved the biggest 1st week sales for a Christian album selling more than 80,000 copies in its first week and entering the Billboard Top 200 at #16. It is known as one of the most important Christian albums of all time.
  - The Offspring re-release their debut album (which originally appeared in 1989), on CD for the first time. This proves to be the band's final release on Epitaph Records; they leave Epitaph and sign with Columbia Records the next year.
  - Enrique Iglesias releases his debut album, in Spanish. It tops the Latin album charts and would go on to win a Grammy and produce five No. 1 singles on Billboard's Hot Latin Tracks chart.
- December 4 – The Beatles release "Free as a Bird" as their first new single in over 20 years.
- December 21 – Madonna is subpoenaed to testify on January 3, 1996, against her stalker, Robert Hoskins, at the Criminal Courts Building in Los Angeles, California, USA. Hoskins was shot by a security guard outside her estate in Los Angeles in May 1995 for trespassing on her property and threatening to marry or kill her.
- December 31 – The twenty-fourth annual New Year's Rockin' Eve special airs on ABC, with appearances by Brandy, Goo Goo Dolls, Kool & the Gang, Martin Page and The Rembrandts.

=== Also in 1995 ===
- In Flames hires Björn Gelotte & Anders Fridén.
- Three members of R.E.M., Bill Berry, Mike Mills and Michael Stipe, fall ill while on the band's "Monster Tour". Berry suffers an aneurysm which required immediate surgery, Stipe suffers a hiatal hernia and Mills undergoes an appendectomy.
- Paul D'Amour leaves Tool.
- John Denver – The Wildlife Concert (US single: "For You")
- Kid 'n Play disbands.

== Bands formed ==
- See Musical groups established in 1995

== Bands disbanded ==
- See Musical groups disestablished in 1995

== Bands reformed ==
- See Musical groups reestablished in 1995

== Albums released ==
=== January–March ===
Date		Album	Artist	Notes
J A N U A R Y	1	Daredevil	Fu Manchu	-
J A N U A R Y	3	A Thousand Memories	Rhett Akins	-
J A N U A R Y	3	Amok	Sentenced	-
J A N U A R Y	3	Higher Learning	Various Artists	Soundtrack
J A N U A R Y	3	Old Enough to Know Better	Wade Hayes	-
J A N U A R Y	6	Mary Lou Lord	Mary Lou Lord	EP
J A N U A R Y	6	My Starting Point Is Here	Aaron Kwok	UFO Record Semi-finale
J A N U A R Y	6	To Persist	Nicky Wu	UFO Record Semi-finale
J A N U A R Y	10	Dah Shinin'	Smif-N-Wessun	-
J A N U A R Y	10	Demon Knight	Various Artists	Soundtrack
J A N U A R Y	10	From the Bottom Up	Brownstone	-
J A N U A R Y	10	The Hard Stuff	Wayne Kramer	Solo Debut
J A N U A R Y	13	Beyond the Dancing	Troy Cassar-Daley	-
J A N U A R Y	16	The Rapture	Siouxsie and the Banshees	UK
J A N U A R Y	16	University	Throwing Muses	-
J A N U A R Y	17	Do You Want More?!!!??!	The Roots	-
J A N U A R Y	17	The Fun of Open Discussion	John Hartford & Bob Carlin	-
J A N U A R Y	17	Look What the Rookie Did	Zumpano	-
J A N U A R Y	17	Second Coming	The Stone Roses	US
J A N U A R Y	18	Bruse Lee Marvin Gaye	Milk Cult	-
J A N U A R Y	19	Blonde Redhead	Blonde Redhead	-
J A N U A R Y	20	The Last Supper	Belphegor	-
J A N U A R Y	20	Sounds of Beautiful Experience	On Thorns I Lay	-
J A N U A R Y	23	Behind Closed Doors	Thunder	-
J A N U A R Y	23	The Great Annihilator	Swans	-
J A N U A R Y	23	Hafted Maul	Dead Voices on Air	-
J A N U A R Y	23	Hard Times	Laughing Hyenas	-
J A N U A R Y	23	Octopus	The Human League	-
J A N U A R Y	23	Personal Best	Team Dresch	Debut
J A N U A R Y	24	Balance	Van Halen	-
J A N U A R Y	24	Charlie Parker with Strings	Charlie Parker	-
J A N U A R Y	24	Cocktails	Too Short	-
J A N U A R Y	24	Friday Afternoon in the Universe	Medeski, Martin & Wood	-
J A N U A R Y	24	Good Times	Subway	-
J A N U A R Y	24	Ham Fisted	Local H	-
J A N U A R Y	24	Hog Wild	Hank Williams Jr.	-
J A N U A R Y	24	The Jerky Boys	Various Artists	Soundtrack
J A N U A R Y	24	Lamprey	Bettie Serveert	-
J A N U A R Y	24	Swedish Bassoon Concertos	Gothenburg Symphony Orchestra	-
J A N U A R Y	24	This Child	Susan Aglukark	-
J A N U A R Y	24	You Gotta Love That!	Neal McCoy	-
J A N U A R Y	25	Melody Boulevard	Joe Hisaishi	-
J A N U A R Y	25	Prick	Prick	-
J A N U A R Y	27	Fist City	Tribe 8	Debut
J A N U A R Y	30	The Sky Moves Sideways	Porcupine Tree	-
J A N U A R Y	30	Good News from the Next World	Simple Minds	-
J A N U A R Y	30	Dogs of War	Saxon	-
J A N U A R Y	30	Leftism	Leftfield	-
J A N U A R Y	30	Millennium Fever	Apollo 440	-
J A N U A R Y	30	Nice Ass	Free Kitten	-
J A N U A R Y	31	... and the Beat Goes On!	Scooter	-
J A N U A R Y	?	Dudebox	Billy Talent	EP
J A N U A R Y	?	Facts and Fictions	Asian Dub Foundation	Debut
J A N U A R Y	?	Gettin' to It	Christian McBride	Debut
J A N U A R Y	?	The Light	Spock's Beard	Debut
J A N U A R Y	?	Pharos	Seti	-
J A N U A R Y	?	We Live Here	Pat Metheny Group	-
F E B R U A R Y	3	Of Chaos and Eternal Night	Dark Tranquillity	Compilation
F E B R U A R Y	5	Out of My Heads	Jennifer Rush	-
F E B R U A R Y	6	Mobile Safari	The Pastels	-
F E B R U A R Y	6	Pygmalion	Slowdive	-
F E B R U A R Y	6	Regurgitator	Regurgitator	EP, Debut
F E B R U A R Y	6	World of Morrissey	Morrissey	Compilation
F E B R U A R Y	6	Worry Bomb	Carter the Unstoppable Sex Machine	-
F E B R U A R Y	7	All in the Game	Crime Boss	-
F E B R U A R Y	7	Being Myself	Juvenile	-
F E B R U A R Y	7	For God and Country	Good Riddance	-
F E B R U A R Y	7	Now That I've Found You: A Collection	Alison Krauss	Compilation
F E B R U A R Y	7	Waiting for the Punchline	Extreme	-
F E B R U A R Y	7	The Woman in Me	Shania Twain	-
F E B R U A R Y	8	3 Years to Become a Ravermaniac	DJ Hooligan	-
F E B R U A R Y	8	Junjō Karen Otome Moyō	Yuki Uchida	-
F E B R U A R Y	9	Adak	İzel	-
F E B R U A R Y	10	Amid Its Hallowed Mirth	Novembers Doom	-
F E B R U A R Y	10	Dream In The Absence of The Night Dream	Dave Wong	UFO Record Semi-finale
F E B R U A R Y	10	Law and Disorder	Larry the Cable Guy	-
F E B R U A R Y	10	Sorcery	Kataklysm	-
F E B R U A R Y	13	Chewyfoot	Wingtip Sloat	-
F E B R U A R Y	13	God Hears Pleas of the Innocent	Killdozer	-
F E B R U A R Y	13	Smart	Sleeper	Debut
F E B R U A R Y	14	Black	Lita Ford	-
F E B R U A R Y	14	Driver Not Included	Orange 9mm	-
F E B R U A R Y	14	Hanky Panky	The The	-
F E B R U A R Y	14	It's Five O'Clock Somewhere	Slash's Snakepit	-
F E B R U A R Y	14	Junior Citizen	Poster Children	-
F E B R U A R Y	14	King	Belly	-
F E B R U A R Y	14	Nevermore	Nevermore	Debut
F E B R U A R Y	14	The Rapture	Siouxsie and the Banshees	US
F E B R U A R Y	14	Realistic	Ivy	-
F E B R U A R Y	14	Thinkin' About You	Trisha Yearwood	-
F E B R U A R Y	14	Tomorrow the Green Grass	The Jayhawks	-
F E B R U A R Y	15	¡Leche con Carne!	No Use for a Name	-
F E B R U A R Y	17	No Protection	Massive Attack	Remix CD
F E B R U A R Y	17	Cheshire Cat	Blink-182	Debut
F E B R U A R Y	18	Painted Desert	Ikue Mori	-
F E B R U A R Y	20	Big Red Car	The Wiggles	-
F E B R U A R Y	20	Maxinquaye	Tricky	UK
F E B R U A R Y	20	Singles	The Smiths	Compilation
F E B R U A R Y	20	Single History IV: 1991-1994	The Alfee	-
F E B R U A R Y	21	Murder Love	Snow	-
F E B R U A R Y	21	Safe + Sound	DJ Quik	-
F E B R U A R Y	27	Alive in Studio A	Bruce Dickinson	Live
F E B R U A R Y	27	Cerebral Caustic	The Fall	-
F E B R U A R Y	27	Delete Yourself!	Atari Teenage Riot	Debut
F E B R U A R Y	27	Greatest Hits	Bruce Springsteen	Compilation
F E B R U A R Y	27	To Bring You My Love	PJ Harvey	-
F E B R U A R Y	27	Undisclosed Files Addendum	Hawkwind	Live
F E B R U A R Y	28	13 Unlucky Numbers	Wax	-
F E B R U A R Y	28	1000 Fires	Traci Lords	Debut
F E B R U A R Y	28	Ball-Hog or Tugboat?	Mike Watt	-
F E B R U A R Y	28	Big Choice	Face to Face	-
F E B R U A R Y	28	Coast II Coast	Tha Alkaholiks	-
F E B R U A R Y	28	Deluxe	Better Than Ezra	Elektra re-release
F E B R U A R Y	28	Diaspora	Natacha Atlas	Debut
F E B R U A R Y	28	Do You Wanna Ride?	Adina Howard	Debut
F E B R U A R Y	28	'EX' All Time Favourites	Shirley Kwan	-
F E B R U A R Y	28	Here Comes Success	Band of Susans	-
F E B R U A R Y	28	Manic Compression	Quicksand	-
F E B R U A R Y	28	Pieces of You	Jewel	Debut
F E B R U A R Y	28	Train a Comin'	Steve Earle	-
F E B R U A R Y	?	Bergtatt – Et eeventyr i 5 capitler	Ulver	Debut
F E B R U A R Y	?	Pain Killer	Energy Orchard	-
M A R C H	1	Everything I Long For	Hayden	Debut
M A R C H	2	Cha Cha Cha	EMF	-
M A R C H	3	Speed Pop	Glay	-
M A R C H	6	Beggar on a Beach of Gold	Mike + the Mechanics	-
M A R C H	6	Medusa	Annie Lennox	-
M A R C H	6	Vee Vee	Archers of Loaf	-
M A R C H	7	Nine Livez	Nine	Debut
M A R C H	7	Power of Inner Strength	Grip Inc.	-
M A R C H	7	Ultraphobic	Warrant	-
M A R C H	10	Forever You	Zard	-
M A R C H	10	The Presidents of the United States of America	The Presidents of the United States of America	PopLlama release
M A R C H	11	Fourth Dimension	Stratovarius	-
M A R C H	13	The Bends	Radiohead	-
M A R C H	13	Elastica	Elastica	-
M A R C H	13	In Debt	Disco Inferno	Compilation
M A R C H	13	Keep Your Eyes Open	Double Vision	-
M A R C H	13	King for a Day... Fool for a Lifetime	Faith No More	-
M A R C H	14	100% Fun	Matthew Sweet	-
M A R C H	14	Above	Mad Season	-
M A R C H	14	A Boy Named Goo	Goo Goo Dolls	-
M A R C H	14	Collective Soul	Collective Soul	-
M A R C H	14	Encomium: A Tribute to Led Zeppelin	Various Artists	Led Zeppelin tribute
M A R C H	14	Everything Is Wrong	Moby	-
M A R C H	14	Feels Like Home	Linda Ronstadt	-
M A R C H	14	In a Major Way	E-40	-
M A R C H	14	Me Against the World	2Pac	-
M A R C H	14	Surrender	Kut Klose	-
M A R C H	14	The Ugly One with the Jewels	Laurie Anderson	-
M A R C H	15	For all tid	Dimmu Borgir	-
M A R C H	20	Orbus Terrarum	The Orb	-
M A R C H	20	Made in England	Elton John	-
M A R C H	20	Olympian	Gene	-
M A R C H	20	Succour	Seefeel	
M A R C H	20	Throbbing Pouch	Wagon Christ	-
M A R C H	21	Alien Love Secrets	Steve Vai	EP
M A R C H	21	Brainbloodvolume	Ned's Atomic Dustbin	-
M A R C H	21	Conversation Peace	Stevie Wonder	-
M A R C H	21	A Day at the Beach	Sonia Dada	-
M A R C H	21	Dopes to Infinity	Monster Magnet	-
M A R C H	21	The Edges of Twilight	The Tea Party	-
M A R C H	21	Fire to Fire	Tanya Tucker	-
M A R C H	21	Home	Blessid Union of Souls	Debut
M A R C H	21	Naveed	Our Lady Peace	US
M A R C H	21	One Track Mind	Railroad Jerk	-
M A R C H	21	El Tiempo Es Oro	Paulina Rubio	-
M A R C H	21	Relish	Joan Osborne	Debut
M A R C H	21	Symbolic	Death	-
M A R C H	21	Yes	Morphine	-
M A R C H	23	Use Your Brain	Clawfinger	-
M A R C H	24	Dance of Fire	Aziza Mustafa Zadeh	-
M A R C H	24	Life	The Cardigans	-
M A R C H	25	The Beacon Street Collection	No Doubt	-
M A R C H	25	Delicious	Dreams Come True	-
M A R C H	27	D'eux	Celine Dion	-
M A R C H	27	Frogstomp	Silverchair	Debut
M A R C H	27	Nassau	The Sea and Cake	-
M A R C H	27	Ocean Beach	Red House Painters	-
M A R C H	27	Thank You	Duran Duran	Covers Album
M A R C H	27	Ventolin	Aphex Twin	EP
M A R C H	27	Wake Up!	The Boo Radleys	-
M A R C H	27	Wild Love	Smog	-
M A R C H	28	A.M.	Wilco	Debut
M A R C H	28	Another Night	Real McCoy	-
M A R C H	28	Candy Rain	Soul for Real	Debut
M A R C H	28	Faith in Me, Faith in You	Doug Stone	-
M A R C H	28	John Michael Montgomery	John Michael Montgomery	-
M A R C H	28	Lifestylez ov da Poor & Dangerous	Big L	Debut
M A R C H	28	My Brother the Cow	Mudhoney	-
M A R C H	28	Only Everything	Juliana Hatfield	-
M A R C H	28	Return to the 36 Chambers: The Dirty Version	Ol' Dirty Bastard	Debut
M A R C H	28	Subhuman Race	Skid Row	-
M A R C H	28	Tank Girl soundtrack	Various Artists	Soundtrack
M A R C H	28	The Great Speeches Vol. 1	Ronald Reagan	Spoken Word
M A R C H	28	We Get There When We Do	Suddenly, Tammy!	-
M A R C H	31	Amita Tata Young	Tata Young	Debut
M A R C H	31	Fiendin' 4 tha Funk	11/5	Debut
M A R C H	?	Black Secret Technology	A Guy Called Gerald	-
M A R C H	?	Teeth and Tissue	The Headstones	-
M A R C H	?	One Day	Jang Pill Soon	-

=== April–June ===
Date		Album	Artist	Notes
A P R I L	1	The Philosophy of Momus	Momus	-
A P R I L	3	Live Bites	Scorpions	Live
A P R I L	3	Sventevith (Storming Near the Baltic)	Behemoth	-
A P R I L	3	Thrak	King Crimson	-
A P R I L	4	Alien Lanes	Guided by Voices	-
A P R I L	4	Civilization Phaze III	Frank Zappa	-
A P R I L	4	Heavy as a Really Heavy Thing	Strapping Young Lad	-
A P R I L	4	Imaginations from the Other Side	Blind Guardian	-
A P R I L	4	Lemonade and Brownies	Sugar Ray	Debut
A P R I L	4	Lost Dogs and Mixed Blessings	John Prine	-
A P R I L	4	Nihil	KMFDM	-
A P R I L	4	The Rhythm of the Night	Corona	Debut
A P R I L	4	The Road Goes On Forever	The Highwaymen	-
A P R I L	4	Rub It Better	General Public	-
A P R I L	4	This Is How We Do It	Montell Jordan	Debut
A P R I L	4	When You Get a Little Lonely	Maureen McCormick	-
A P R I L	6	Dandys Rule, OK?	The Dandy Warhols	-
A P R I L	6	Now That's What I Call Music! 30	Various Artists	UK series; Compilation
A P R I L	7	94 Diskont	Oval	-
A P R I L	7	Clockseed	Vampire Rodents	-
A P R I L	7	Jill Sobule	Jill Sobule	-
A P R I L	7	Running on Ice	Vertical Horizon	-
A P R I L	10	Picture This	Wet Wet Wet	-
A P R I L	11	3	FireHouse	-
A P R I L	11	Astro-Creep: 2000	White Zombie	-
A P R I L	11	Blonder and Blonder	The Muffs	-
A P R I L	11	Friday	Various Artists	Soundtrack
A P R I L	11	Infrared Riding Hood	Tad	-
A P R I L	11	Pummel	All	-
A P R I L	11	Wowee Zowee	Pavement	-
A P R I L	11	You'd Prefer an Astronaut	Hum	-
A P R I L	14	Walk on Water	UFO	Japan-only release until 1997
A P R I L	18	A Small Deadly Space	Fight	-
A P R I L	18	Burnt Offerings	Iced Earth	-
A P R I L	18	Further	Flying Saucer Attack	-
A P R I L	18	Once upon the Cross	Deicide	-
A P R I L	18	This Beautiful Mess	Sixpence None the Richer	-
A P R I L	18	Vibrator	Terence Trent D'Arby	-
A P R I L	19	I Hate You with a Passion	Dre Dog	-
A P R I L	21	Born Annoying	Helmet	Compilation
A P R I L	24	...I Care Because You Do	Aphex Twin	
A P R I L	24	The Future of What	Unwound	-
A P R I L	24	Plastic Green Head	Trouble	-
A P R I L	24	Such Friends Are Dangerous	Excuse 17	-
A P R I L	24	Wolfheart	Moonspell	Debut
A P R I L	25	Spirit of the Wild	Ted Nugent	-
A P R I L	25	Ain't Had Enough Fun	Little Feat	-
A P R I L	25	Come Together: America Salutes the Beatles	Various Artists	Country music tribute to The Beatles
A P R I L	25	Cuando los Ángeles Lloran	Maná	-
A P R I L	25	Domination	Morbid Angel	-
A P R I L	25	Drift	Flotsam and Jetsam	-
A P R I L	25	The Infamous	Mobb Deep	-
A P R I L	25	Short Bus	Filter	Debut
A P R I L	28	Rainmaker	Fair Warning	-
A P R I L	?	The Dirt of Luck	Helium	-
A P R I L	?	No Mercy	Daddy Yankee	-
A P R I L	?	Silver Sweepstakes	Knapsack	-
A P R I L	?	Three Legged Dog	The Cruel Sea	Australia
M A Y	1	Jerk of All Trades	Lunachicks	-
M A Y	1	Machiavelli and the Four Seasons	TISM	-
M A Y	1	Sea of Light	Uriah Heep	-
M A Y	1	Stylin' Up	Christine Anu	Debut
M A Y	2	Divinities: Twelve Dances with God	Ian Anderson	-
M A Y	2	Electr-O-Pura	Yo La Tengo	-
M A Y	2	Fear No Evil	Slaughter	-
M A Y	2	Fun Trick Noisemaker	The Apples In Stereo	Debut
M A Y	2	MTV Unplugged	Bob Dylan	Live
M A Y	2	Sittin' on Chrome	Masta Ace Incorporated	-
M A Y	5	Everything Sucks	Reel Big Fish	-
M A Y	8	Green Wheels	Merzbow	-
M A Y	8	Nobody Else	Take That	-
M A Y	8	Tilt	Scott Walker	-
M A Y	9	Clutch	Clutch	-
M A Y	9	Kojak Variety	Elvis Costello	Live
M A Y	9	Nemesisters	Babes in Toyland	-
M A Y	9	Psychic Hearts	Thurston Moore	Solo Debut
M A Y	9	The Return of the Space Cowboy	Jamiroquai	US
M A Y	9	Some Rainy Morning	Robert Cray	-
M A Y	9	Time After Time	Etta James	-
M A Y	12	Destroy Erase Improve	Meshuggah	-
M A Y	15	About Time	The Stranglers	-
M A Y	15	A Million Year Girl	Max Sharam	Debut
M A Y	15	Battles in the North	Immortal	
M A Y	15	Drink Me	Salad	
M A Y	15	I Should Coco	Supergrass	Debut
M A Y	15	Bodies	Sidi Bou Said	-
M A Y	15	Inzombia	Slant 6	-
M A Y	15	Orchid	Opeth	Debut
M A Y	16	Dysfunctional	Dokken	-
M A Y	16	4-Wheel Vibe	Bracket	-
M A Y	16	Mumtaz Mahal	Taj Mahal	-
M A Y	17	Boomerang	Hanson	Debut
M A Y	21	Musically Incorrect	Y&T	-
M A Y	22	The Angel and the Dark River	My Dying Bride	-
M A Y	22	Black in Mind	Rage	-
M A Y	22	P.H.U.Q.	The Wildhearts	-
M A Y	23	Daryle Singletary	Daryle Singletary	-
M A Y	23	The Inevitable	Squirrel Nut Zippers	-
M A Y	23	Dwight Live	Dwight Yoakam	Live
M A Y	23	Forever Blue	Chris Isaak	-
M A Y	23	Eternal	Malevolent Creation	-
M A Y	23	God of Love	Bad Brains	-
M A Y	23	Gone Glimmering	Chavez	-
M A Y	23	Long Division	Low	-
M A Y	23	LP	The Rembrandts	LP
M A Y	23	Root Down	Beastie Boys	EP
M A Y	23	Sparkle and Fade	Everclear	-
M A Y	29	Pulse	Pink Floyd	Live
M A Y	29	Further Down the Spiral	Nine Inch Nails	Remix CD
M A Y	29	Grand Prix	Teenage Fanclub	-
M A Y	29	Land of the Free	Gamma Ray	-
M A Y	29	Sex Affairs	E-Rotic	Debut
M A Y	29	A Spanner in the Works	Rod Stewart	-
M A Y	30	Freaks of Nature	Kansas	-
M A Y	30	Goodfellas	Show and A.G.	-
M A Y	30	Love and Money	Eddie Money	-
M A Y	30	Mystic Stylez	Three 6 Mafia	-
M A Y	30	Pocahontas soundtrack	Various Artists	Soundtrack
M A Y	30	Poverty's Paradise	Naughty by Nature	-
M A Y	31	Blues for Greeny	Gary Moore	-
M A Y	?	Rarestonebowie	David Bowie	Compilation
M A Y	?	Stanley Road	Paul Weller	-
M A Y	?	Taste of Heaven	Takara	-
M A Y	?	Oolooloo	The Pietasters	-
J U N E	1	Masquerade in Blood	Sodom	-
J U N E	1	Ogród koncentracyjny	Świetliki	-
J U N E	5	Panzerfaust	Darkthrone	-
J U N E	5	Octagon	Bathory	-
J U N E	5	Forbidden	Black Sabbath	-
J U N E	5	Days Like This	Van Morrison	-
J U N E	5	Still Not Black Enough	W.A.S.P.	UK
J U N E	6	Batman Forever	Various Artists	Soundtrack
J U N E	6	And the Music Speaks	All-4-One	-
J U N E	6	Happy Days	Catherine Wheel	-
J U N E	6	The Best of Branigan	Laura Branigan	Compilation
J U N E	6	Derrumbe	Gerardo	-
J U N E	6	Glow	The Innocence Mission	-
J U N E	6	Hi™ How Are You Today?	Ashley MacIsaac	-
J U N E	6	Tales from the Punchbowl	Primus	-
J U N E	6	Let Your Dim Light Shine	Soul Asylum	-
J U N E	6	A Turtle's Dream	Abbey Lincoln	-
J U N E	6	The Spider's Lullabye	King Diamond	-
J U N E	9	69/96	Cornelius	-
J U N E	9	Drainland	M. Gira	-
J U N E	9	Sacrificial Cake	Jarboe	-
J U N E	12	Post	Björk	-
J U N E	12	Draconian Times	Paradise Lost	-
J U N E	12	Infernal Love	Therapy?	-
J U N E	12	Red Medicine	Fugazi	-
J U N E	12	Whigfield	Whigfield	Debut
J U N E	13	About Time	Pennywise	-
J U N E	13	All I Need to Know	Kenny Chesney	-
J U N E	13	Demanufacture	Fear Factory	Sophomore; Debut with Christian Olde Wolbers
J U N E	13	Femi Kuti	Femi Kuti	-
J U N E	13	Head Over Heels	Paula Abdul	-
J U N E	13	Home	Deep Blue Something	Interscope re-release
J U N E	13	Jagged Little Pill	Alanis Morissette	-
J U N E	13	Menace to Sobriety	Ugly Kid Joe	-
J U N E	13	Two Headed	Spirit of the West	-
J U N E	13	The Unboxed Set	Angry Samoans	Box Set
J U N E	15	Sing	Abra Moore	Solo Debut
J U N E	15	Subterranean	In Flames	EP
J U N E	16	Cerberus Shoal	Cerberus Shoal	Debut
J U N E	19	Replenish	Reef	Debut
J U N E	20	HIStory: Past, Present and Future, Book I	Michael Jackson	Compilation disc + New studio disc
J U N E	20	A Very Fine Love	Dusty Springfield	US
J U N E	20	Are You Driving Me Crazy?	Seam	-
J U N E	20	2000	Grand Puba	-
J U N E	20	Bing, Bing, Bing!	Charlie Hunter	-
J U N E	20	Boheme	Deep Forest	-
J U N E	20	F-Punk	Big Audio Dynamite	-
J U N E	20	Fast Stories... from Kid Coma	Truly	-
J U N E	20	I Am an Elastic Firecracker	Tripping Daisy	-
J U N E	20	Incidental Music 1991-95	Superchunk	Compilation
J U N E	20	Lorada	Johnny Hallyday	-
J U N E	20	Oddities, Abnormalities and Curiosities	Circle Jerks	-
J U N E	20	Rasta Business	Burning Spear	-
J U N E	20	Tigerlily	Natalie Merchant	-
J U N E	22	Grandpaw Would	Ben Lee	Debut
J U N E	23	Teenage Politics	MxPx	-
J U N E	25	Besides	Sugar	Compilation
J U N E	25	Chat Chat	Takako Minekawa	Debut
J U N E	25	Sleater-Kinney	Sleater-Kinney	Debut
J U N E	26	Foo Fighters	Foo Fighters	Debut
J U N E	26	Afraid of Sunlight	Marillion	-
J U N E	26	The Drive	Haddaway	-
J U N E	26	Exit Planet Dust	The Chemical Brothers	Debut
J U N E	27	Apollo 13 soundtrack	James Horner	Soundtrack
J U N E	27	Fey	Fey	Debut
J U N E	27	Gov't Mule	Gov't Mule	-
J U N E	27	I Wish	Skee-Lo	-
J U N E	27	A Live One	Phish	Live
J U N E	27	Mirror Ball	Neil Young	-
J U N E	27	Modernday Folklore	Ian Moore	-
J U N E	27	Only Heaven	The Young Gods	-
J U N E	27	Rocks Your Lame Ass	Hagfish	-
J U N E	27	Singles	Alison Moyet	Compilation
J U N E	27	These Days	Bon Jovi	-
J U N E	?	Alfaro Vive, Carajo!	At the Drive-In	EP
J U N E	?	Mirror Mirror	10cc	-
J U N E	?	Mudbird Shivers	The Ex	-

=== July–September ===
Date		Album	Artist	Notes
J U L Y	3	A Northern Soul	The Verve	-
J U L Y	4	Answer That and Stay Fashionable	AFI	-
J U L Y	4	Brown Sugar	D'Angelo	Debut
J U L Y	4	Think with Your Heart	Debbie Gibson	-
J U L Y	4	Brothas Doobie	Funkdoobiest	-
J U L Y	4	Vol V – Believe	Soul II Soul	-
J U L Y	11	311	311	-
J U L Y	11	...And the Circus Leaves Town	Kyuss	-
J U L Y	11	Boombastic	Shaggy	-
J U L Y	11	Dangerous Minds soundtrack	Various Artists	Soundtrack
J U L Y	11	Fluke	Rusty	Debut
J U L Y	11	Off the Hook	Xscape	-
J U L Y	11	Severe Exposure	Six Finger Satellite	-
J U L Y	11	Sleepy Eyed	Buffalo Tom	-
J U L Y	15	Ejector Seat Reservation	Swervedriver	-
J U L Y	18	¡Adios Amigos!	Ramones	-
J U L Y	18	Bette of Roses	Bette Midler	-
J U L Y	18	Cesária	Cesária Évora	-
J U L Y	18	Chants and Dances of the Native Americans	Sacred Spirit	Debut
J U L Y	18	Clueless soundtrack	Various Artists	Soundtrack
J U L Y	18	Dreaming of You	Selena	Posthumous
J U L Y	18	Guru's Jazzmatazz, Vol. 2: The New Reality	Guru	-
J U L Y	18	Hidden Treasures	Megadeth	Rarities EP
J U L Y	18	Hot House	Bruce Hornsby	-
J U L Y	18	The Long Goodbye	Procol Harum	-
J U L Y	18	Lost Somewhere Between the Earth and My Home	Geraldine Fibbers	-
J U L Y	18	Mainliner: Wreckage from the Past	Social Distortion	Compilation
J U L Y	18	Miss Thang	Monica	Debut
J U L Y	18	Not a Pretty Girl	Ani DiFranco	-
J U L Y	18	Reflections	After 7	-
J U L Y	18	Restless	Shelby Lynne	-
J U L Y	18	The Show, the After Party, the Hotel	Jodeci	-
J U L Y	18	'Til Shiloh	Buju Banton	-
J U L Y	18	Totally Crushed Out!	That Dog	-
J U L Y	18	Use Your Fingers	The Bloodhound Gang	-
J U L Y	19	La La La	Maki Ohguro	-
J U L Y	21	Elliott Smith	Elliott Smith	-
J U L Y	21	La Alteración	Akina Nakamori	-
J U L Y	21	Meiso	DJ Krush	-
J U L Y	24	Caution to the Wind	Pura Fé	Debut
J U L Y	25	Dog Days	Blue Mountain	-
J U L Y	25	Doubelievengod	Natas	-
J U L Y	25	E. 1999 Eternal	Bone Thugs-n-Harmony	-
J U L Y	25	The Presidents of the United States of America	The Presidents of the United States of America	Columbia re-release; Remixed
J U L Y	28	Invisible	La Ley	-
J U L Y	28	Seed	Prototype	-
J U L Y	31	The Garden	Merril Bainbridge	Debut; AUS
A U G U S T	1	Bad Habits	Colin James	-
A U G U S T	1	Brother's Keeper	Rich Mullins	-
A U G U S T	1	Fight for Your Mind	Ben Harper	-
A U G U S T	1	Killer Cuts	Robin Beanland	-
A U G U S T	1	Now That's What I Call Music! 31	Various Artists	Compilation
A U G U S T	1	Only Built 4 Cuban Linx...	Raekwon	-
A U G U S T	1	Set Your Goals	CIV	-
A U G U S T	1	We Care	Whale	-
A U G U S T	1	Wholesale Meats and Fish	Letters to Cleo	-
A U G U S T	7	It's Great When You're Straight...Yeah	Black Grape	Debut
A U G U S T	7	Timeless	Goldie	Debut
A U G U S T	7	Alternative	Pet Shop Boys	Compilation
A U G U S T	7	Sweden	The Mountain Goats	-
A U G U S T	7	The Twenty-Seven Points	The Fall	Live
A U G U S T	8	Ben Folds Five	Ben Folds Five	Debut
A U G U S T	8	Brown Bag LP	Citizen King	Debut
A U G U S T	8	Hot Charity	Rocket from the Crypt	-
A U G U S T	8	I Remember You	Brian McKnight	-
A U G U S T	8	Penthouse	Luna	-
A U G U S T	8	The Sacrilicious Sounds of the Supersuckers	Supersuckers	-
A U G U S T	8	Spirit of '73: Rock for Choice	Various Artists	-
A U G U S T	8	Terri Clark	Terri Clark	-
A U G U S T	13	New	Regurgitator	Australia, EP
A U G U S T	14	Deep Dead Blue	Elvis Costello and Bill Frisell	Live
A U G U S T	14	Donkey Rhubarb	Aphex Twin	EP
A U G U S T	15	Garbage	Garbage	Debut
A U G U S T	15	Dirt Track Date	Southern Culture on the Skids	-
A U G U S T	15	I Just Wasn't Made for These Times	Brian Wilson	-
A U G U S T	15	King Ferus	Ferus Mustafov	also known as Macedonian Wedding Soul Cooking
A U G U S T	15	A Moment of Forever	Kris Kristofferson	-
A U G U S T	15	Mortal Kombat soundtrack	Various Artists	Soundtrack
A U G U S T	15	Real Brothas	B.G. Knocc Out and Dresta	-
A U G U S T	15	The Show	Various Artists	Soundtrack
A U G U S T	15	Soup	Blind Melon	-
A U G U S T	15	True Forever	Andy Lau	Philips Record Begins
A U G U S T	18	Goofyfoot	Phranc	EP
A U G U S T	19	Ray Gun Suitcase	Pere Ubu	-
A U G U S T	21	Viva Last Blues	Palace Music	-
A U G U S T	22	...And Out Come the Wolves	Rancid	-
A U G U S T	22	Good News in Hard Times	The Sisters of Glory	Debut
A U G U S T	22	Her Highness	Medicine	-
A U G U S T	22	Hit & Run Holiday	My Life with the Thrill Kill Kult	-
A U G U S T	22	I Heard They Suck Live!!	NOFX	Live
A U G U S T	22	I'll Lead You Home	Michael W. Smith	-
A U G U S T	22	Mandylion	The Gathering	-
A U G U S T	22	Pet Your Friends	Dishwalla	-
A U G U S T	22	Pezcore	Less Than Jake	-
A U G U S T	22	Pucker!	The Selecter	-
A U G U S T	22	Tindersticks	Tindersticks	Second album
A U G U S T	23	Life	Talisman	-
A U G U S T	25	Methodrone	The Brian Jonestown Massacre	-
A U G U S T	25	Modes of Transportation Vol. 1	Spookey Ruben	-
A U G U S T	28	The Charlatans	The Charlatans	-
A U G U S T	28	20 Mothers	Julian Cope	-
A U G U S T	28	Southpaw Grammar	Morrissey	UK
A U G U S T	29	Cheapness and Beauty	Boy George	-
A U G U S T	29	Conspiracy	Junior M.A.F.I.A.	-
A U G U S T	29	Faith	Faith Evans	Debut
A U G U S T	29	Freedom Bondage	Zeni Geva	-
A U G U S T	29	It Matters to Me	Faith Hill	-
A U G U S T	29	Life Begins at 40 Million	The Bogmen	-
A U G U S T	29	The Road Home	Heart	Live
A U G U S T	29	Wind Can't Stop	Aaron Kwok	UFO Record Finale
A U G U S T	?	The Damnation Game	Symphony X	-
A U G U S T	?	New Moon Daughter	Cassandra Wilson	-
A U G U S T	?	No Doubt	Petra	-
A U G U S T	?	Sargasso Sea	Pram	-
A U G U S T	?	Twoism	Boards of Canada	Debut
S E P T E M B E R	1	All Else Failed	Zao	-
S E P T E M B E R	1	Crossover	Yoshinori Sunahara	-
S E P T E M B E R	1	Heavenly	L'Arc-en-Ciel	-
S E P T E M B E R	1	Ocean Drive	Lighthouse Family	-
S E P T E M B E R	4	La Mia Vita Violenta	Blonde Redhead	-
S E P T E M B E R	4	Roots to Branches	Jethro Tull	UK
S E P T E M B E R	5	American Standard	Seven Mary Three	-
S E P T E M B E R	5	Nowhere to Here	Blue Rodeo	-
S E P T E M B E R	5	Sommersprossen	Die Flippers	-
S E P T E M B E R	5	Take Me Higher	Diana Ross	-
S E P T E M B E R	8	The Blue Moods of Spain	Spain	Debut
S E P T E M B E R	9	The Help Album	Various Artists	Charity Album
S E P T E M B E R	11	The Great Escape	Blur	-
S E P T E M B E R	11	Stranger in Us All	Ritchie Blackmore's Rainbow	-
S E P T E M B E R	11	Serpentine Gallery	Switchblade Symphony	Debut
S E P T E M B E R	12	One Hot Minute	Red Hot Chili Peppers	-
S E P T E M B E R	12	Circus	Lenny Kravitz	-
S E P T E M B E R	12	Ask for It	Hole	EP
S E P T E M B E R	12	Dear You	Jawbreaker	-
S E P T E M B E R	12	Empty	God Lives Underwater	-
S E P T E M B E R	12	Inside Out	MC Hammer	-
S E P T E M B E R	12	A Medio Vivir	Ricky Martin	-
S E P T E M B E R	12	Nine High a Pallet	brute.	-
S E P T E M B E R	12	Planet B.A.D.	Big Audio Dynamite	Compilation
S E P T E M B E R	12	Seemless	Into Another	-
S E P T E M B E R	12	Up	Great Big Sea	Canada
S E P T E M B E R	18	Bring 'em All In	Mike Scott	-
S E P T E M B E R	18	Gentle Creatures	Tarnation	-
S E P T E M B E R	18	Paranoid and Sunburnt	Skunk Anansie	Debut
S E P T E M B E R	18	On	Echobelly	-
S E P T E M B E R	19	A Change of Seasons	Dream Theater	EP
S E P T E M B E R	19	All I Want	Tim McGraw	-
S E P T E M B E R	19	Cherry Alive	Eve's Plum	-
S E P T E M B E R	19	Clouds Taste Metallic	The Flaming Lips	-
S E P T E M B E R	19	Coast to Coast Motel	G. Love & Special Sauce	-
S E P T E M B E R	19	Gilt	Machines of Loving Grace	-
S E P T E M B E R	19	Greatest Hits (1985–1995)	Michael Bolton	Compilation
S E P T E M B E R	19	Here's Where the Strings Come In	Superchunk	-
S E P T E M B E R	19	Huang Chung	Wang Chung	Re-release
S E P T E M B E R	19	In The Grass	Splendora	Debut
S E P T E M B E R	19	Ledbetter Heights	Kenny Wayne Shepherd	-
S E P T E M B E R	19	Naked Songs – Live and Acoustic	Ricki Lee Jones	Live
S E P T E M B E R	19	NOLA	Down	Debut
S E P T E M B E R	19	Randy Newman's Faust	Randy Newman	-
S E P T E M B E R	19	See You on the Other Side	Mercury Rev	-
S E P T E M B E R	19	Trace	Son Volt	Debut
S E P T E M B E R	21	Mi-Chemin	Yuki Uchida	-
S E P T E M B E R	21	Woob2 4495	Woob	-
S E P T E M B E R	25	Ballbreaker	AC/DC	-
S E P T E M B E R	25	Outside	David Bowie	-
S E P T E M B E R	25	Forever Failure	Paradise Lost	
S E P T E M B E R	25	Herzeleid	Rammstein	Debut
S E P T E M B E R	25	Smokers Delight	Nightmares on Wax	-
S E P T E M B E R	25	Friendly Fire	Shara Nelson	-
S E P T E M B E R	25	Hard Wired	Front Line Assembly	-
S E P T E M B E R	25	The Unfinished Spanish Galleon of Finley Lake	Spiderbait	-
S E P T E M B E R	25	Voice of Reason	Harem Scarem	-
S E P T E M B E R	26	Daydream	Mariah Carey	Diamond; over 10 million copies sold
S E P T E M B E R	26	The Gold Experience	Prince	-
S E P T E M B E R	26	Peel Slowly and See	The Velvet Underground	Box Set
S E P T E M B E R	26	Washing Machine	Sonic Youth	-
S E P T E M B E R	26	Abriendo Puertas	Gloria Estefan	-
S E P T E M B E R	26	Vivadixiesubmarinetransmissionplot	Sparklehorse	Debut
S E P T E M B E R	26	4,5,6	Kool G Rap	Solo debut
S E P T E M B E R	26	Best of Country Christmas, Vol. 5	Various artists	Compilation
S E P T E M B E R	26	Bienvenue chez moi	Florent Pagny	Compilation
S E P T E M B E R	26	Exit the Dragon	Urge Overkill	-
S E P T E M B E R	26	For Lovers Only	The Temptations	-
S E P T E M B E R	26	Forgiven, Not Forgotten	The Corrs	Debut
S E P T E M B E R	26	Haunted	Six Feet Under	Debut
S E P T E M B E R	26	It's Heavy in Here	Eric Matthews	-
S E P T E M B E R	26	Ring Them Bells	Joan Baez	US; Live
S E P T E M B E R	26	Tails	Lisa Loeb	-
S E P T E M B E R	26	Wrecking Ball	Emmylou Harris	-
S E P T E M B E R	29	Tambu	Toto	Europe
S E P T E M B E R	29	The Carnival Bizarre	Cathedral	-
S E P T E M B E R	30	Romantique 96	Pizzicato Five	-
S E P T E M B E R	?	Abandoned Garden	Michael Franks	-
S E P T E M B E R	?	Jack Ingram	Jack Ingram	-
S E P T E M B E R	?	Hate Rock 'N' Roll	The Jesus and Mary Chain	Compilation

=== October–December ===
Date		Album	Artist	Notes
O C T O B E R	1	A mulher do fim do mundo	Elza Soares	-
O C T O B E R	2	!	The Dismemberment Plan	-
O C T O B E R	2	Corte en Tramite	Javiera y Los Imposibles	Debut
O C T O B E R	2	Grown Man	Loudon Wainwright III	-
O C T O B E R	2	Trinity	My Dying Bride	Compilation
O C T O B E R	2	(What's the Story) Morning Glory?	Oasis	-
O C T O B E R	2	The X Factor	Iron Maiden	-
O C T O B E R	3	Adrenaline	Deftones	Debut
O C T O B E R	3	Curb Servin'	WC and the Maad Circle	-
O C T O B E R	3	Example	For Squirrels	-
O C T O B E R	3	Iaora Tahiti	Mouse on Mars	-
O C T O B E R	3	Jesus Wept	P.M. Dawn	-
O C T O B E R	3	Lucy	Candlebox	-
O C T O B E R	3	Starting Over	Reba McEntire	Platinum; over 1 million copies sold
O C T O B E R	3	This Is Greta!	Greta	-
O C T O B E R	9	Life	Simply Red	-
O C T O B E R	9	Ima	BT	Debut
O C T O B E R	9	Odds & Ends	Dido	-
O C T O B E R	10	1200 Curfews	Indigo Girls	Live
O C T O B E R	10	Boss Hog	Boss Hog	-
O C T O B E R	10	Insomniac	Green Day	-
O C T O B E R	10	Tragic Kingdom	No Doubt	-
O C T O B E R	10	Design of a Decade: 1986–1996	Janet Jackson	Compilation +2 new tracks
O C T O B E R	10	Time	Fleetwood Mac	-
O C T O B E R	10	Frampton Comes Alive! II	Peter Frampton	Live
O C T O B E R	10	All You Can Eat	k.d. lang	-
O C T O B E R	10	Disco Volante	Mr. Bungle	-
O C T O B E R	10	Happy Nowhere	Dog's Eye View	Debut
O C T O B E R	10	Hello	Poe	-
O C T O B E R	10	It's Great When You're Straight...Yeah	Black Grape	-
O C T O B E R	10	KRS-One	KRS-One	-
O C T O B E R	10	Lonestar	Lonestar	-
O C T O B E R	10	Mind of Mystikal	Mystikal	Debut
O C T O B E R	10	Modern Rock	The Clean	-
O C T O B E R	10	Pleasure	Semisonic	EP
O C T O B E R	10	Riddle Box	Insane Clown Posse	-
O C T O B E R	10	Scream, Dracula, Scream!	Rocket from the Crypt	-
O C T O B E R	10	Us and Them: Symphonic Pink Floyd	Jaz Coleman and The London Philharmonic Orchestra	-
O C T O B E R	10	Working Class Hero: A Tribute to John Lennon	Various Artists	John Lennon tribute
O C T O B E R	10	The Worldhood of the World (As Such)	NoMeansNo	-
O C T O B E R	11	Life on a Plate	Millencolin	-
O C T O B E R	13	Robyn Is Here	Robyn	Sweden
O C T O B E R	16	All Change	Cast	Debut
O C T O B E R	16	Ask Me Tomorrow	Mojave 3	Debut
O C T O B E R	16	The Isle of View	The Pretenders	Live
O C T O B E R	16	Journeys by DJ: 70 Minutes of Madness	Coldcut	DJ mix
O C T O B E R	16	The Lone Ranger	Suggs	-
O C T O B E R	16	Mint 400	Ammonia	-
O C T O B E R	16	Plastic Planet	G//Z/R	-
O C T O B E R	16	Raoul and the Kings of Spain	Tears for Fears	-
O C T O B E R	16	Twisted	Hallucinogen	-
O C T O B E R	16	Waterpistol	Shack	-
O C T O B E R	17	The Alien Conspiracy	Crisis n.T.i.	-
O C T O B E R	17	Alive in America	Steely Dan	Live
O C T O B E R	17	Anamorphosée	Mylène Farmer	-
O C T O B E R	17	Amanda Marshall	Amanda Marshall	Debut
O C T O B E R	17	El Concierto	Luis Miguel	Live
O C T O B E R	17	Hypnotize the Moon	Clay Walker	-
O C T O B E R	17	Neu! 4	Neu!	-
O C T O B E R	17	The R*tist 4*merly Known as Dangerous Toys	Dangerous Toys	-
O C T O B E R	18	This Is Christmas	Luther Vandross	Christmas
O C T O B E R	20	10 Wings	Miyuki Nakajima	-
O C T O B E R	20	Do You Like My Tight Sweater?	Moloko	-
O C T O B E R	23	Ozzmosis	Ozzy Osbourne	-
O C T O B E R	23	Vault: Def Leppard Greatest Hits (1980–1995)	Def Leppard	Compilation
O C T O B E R	23	Erasure	Erasure	-
O C T O B E R	23	The Final Experiment	Ayreon	-
O C T O B E R	23	Swingin' with Raymond	Chumbawamba	-
O C T O B E R	23	Dear Sir	Cat Power	-
O C T O B E R	23	Lone Star 119	Nicky Wu	UFO Record Finale
O C T O B E R	23	Would Rather Not Free	Dave Wong	-
O C T O B E R	24	20 Fingers	20 Fingers	-
O C T O B E R	24	All We Got Iz Us	Onyx	-
O C T O B E R	24	Christmas Here with You	The Four Tops	Christmas
O C T O B E R	24	Dead Winter Dead	Savatage	Christmas
O C T O B E R	24	Formula	OLD	-
O C T O B E R	24	Get Lost	The Magnetic Fields	-
O C T O B E R	24	Groove Theory	Groove Theory	-
O C T O B E R	24	Here's to the Ladies	Tony Bennett	-
O C T O B E R	24	It's a Mystery	Bob Seger & the Silver Bullet Band	-
O C T O B E R	24	Jealous One's Envy	Fat Joe	-
O C T O B E R	24	Mellon Collie and the Infinite Sadness	The Smashing Pumpkins	-
O C T O B E R	24	Muovi antaa periksi	Absoluuttinen Nollapiste	-
O C T O B E R	24	Ragnarök	Gwar	-
O C T O B E R	24	Resident Alien	Spacehog	Debut
O C T O B E R	24	Smells Like Children	Marilyn Manson	EP
O C T O B E R	24	Spinner	Brian Eno & Jah Wobble	-
O C T O B E R	24	Stomp 442	Anthrax	-
O C T O B E R	24	Subliminal Plastic Motives	Self	-
O C T O B E R	24	Tapestry Revisited: A Tribute to Carole King	Various Artists	Carole King tribute
O C T O B E R	24	Woman's Gotta Have It	Cornershop	-
O C T O B E R	25	Back in the World of Adventures	The Flower Kings	-
O C T O B E R	25	El Peyote Asesino	El Peyote Asesino	Uruguay, Debut
O C T O B E R	27	Friction	Breach	-
O C T O B E R	30	The Bridge	Ace of Base	-
O C T O B E R	30	Different Class	Pulp	-
O C T O B E R	30	Pacer	The Amps	-
O C T O B E R	30	Power of a Woman	Eternal	-
O C T O B E R	30	Welcome to the Neighborhood	Meat Loaf	-
O C T O B E R	31	Alice In Chains	Alice in Chains	Vinyl
O C T O B E R	31	Always Drink Upstream from the Herd	Riders in the Sky	-
O C T O B E R	31	Cypress Hill III: Temples of Boom	Cypress Hill	-
O C T O B E R	31	Dogg Food	Tha Dogg Pound	-
O C T O B E R	31	Gone	Dwight Yoakam	-
O C T O B E R	31	The Individualist	TR-i (Todd Rundgren)	-
O C T O B E R	31	On Top of the World	8Ball & MJG	-
O C T O B E R	31	Return of the Rentals	The Rentals	-
O C T O B E R	?	Instant	The Ex	-
O C T O B E R	?	Kim Kyung Ho	Kim Kyung Ho	-
N O V E M B E R	1	Fungus Amongus	Incubus	Debut
N O V E M B E R	1	Salt Peter	Ruby	Debut
N O V E M B E R	1	Stalker	Robert Rich and Lustmord	Collaborative album
N O V E M B E R	6	Made in Heaven	Queen	-
N O V E M B E R	6	Love Songs	Elton John	Compilation
N O V E M B E R	6	It's A Man's World	Cher	European release only
N O V E M B E R	6	Jake's Progress soundtrack	Elvis Costello and Richard Harvey	Soundtrack
N O V E M B E R	6	Original Soundtracks 1	Passengers	Collaboration between U2 and Brian Eno
N O V E M B E R	6	Tri Repetae	Autechre	-
N O V E M B E R	7	Something to Remember	Madonna	Compilation +3 new tracks
N O V E M B E R	7	Gangsta's Paradise	Coolio	-
N O V E M B E R	7	All Ages	Bad Religion	Compilation
N O V E M B E R	7	All of This Love	Pam Tillis	-
N O V E M B E R	7	Better Late Than Never	Craig Goldy	-
N O V E M B E R	7	Clouds In My Coffee	Carly Simon	Box Set
N O V E M B E R	7	Demanufacture	Fear Factory	Limited Edition Digipak with Bonus Tracks
N O V E M B E R	7	Double or Nothing	Erick Sermon	-
N O V E M B E R	7	Letters from Chutney	Rainbow Butt Monkeys	Debut; only album before name change to Finger Eleven
N O V E M B E R	7	Liquid Swords	GZA	-
N O V E M B E R	7	Ragged Ass Road	Tom Cochrane	-
N O V E M B E R	7	Rising	Yoko Ono/IMA	-
N O V E M B E R	7	Road Tested	Bonnie Raitt	Live
N O V E M B E R	7	Sunny Day Real Estate	Sunny Day Real Estate	-
N O V E M B E R	7	Soul Food	Goodie Mob	Debut
N O V E M B E R	10	Spacegirl and Other Favorites	The Brian Jonestown Massacre	-
N O V E M B E R	10	Who's Sorry Now?	Babyland	-
N O V E M B E R	13	Stripped	The Rolling Stones	Live
N O V E M B E R	13	Aglio e Olio	Beastie Boys	EP
N O V E M B E R	13	Up All Night	East 17	-
N O V E M B E R	13	Now That's What I Call Music! 32	Various Artists	Compilation
N O V E M B E R	14	Labcabincalifornia	The Pharcyde	-
N O V E M B E R	14	New Beginning	Tracy Chapman	-
N O V E M B E R	14	R. Kelly	R. Kelly	-
N O V E M B E R	14	Slaughter of the Soul	At the Gates	-
N O V E M B E R	14	Southern Gal	Terry Ellis	-
N O V E M B E R	14	Tigerbomb	Guided by Voices	EP
N O V E M B E R	14	Waiting to Exhale: Original Soundtrack Album	Various Artists	Soundtrack
N O V E M B E R	14	Where Forever Begins	Ken Mellons	-
N O V E M B E R	14	Your Little Secret	Melissa Etheridge	-
N O V E M B E R	16	Bif Naked	Bif Naked	Debut
N O V E M B E R	17	Storm of the Light's Bane	Dissection	-
N O V E M B E R	20	The Beatles Anthology, Volume 1	The Beatles	Compilation +1 new track
N O V E M B E R	20	Fixation on a Co-Worker	Deadguy	-
N O V E M B E R	20	The Memory of Trees	Enya	-
N O V E M B E R	21	Enrique Iglesias	Enrique Iglesias	Debut
N O V E M B E R	21	Fresh Horses	Garth Brooks	-
N O V E M B E R	21	The Ghost of Tom Joad	Bruce Springsteen	-
N O V E M B E R	21	Jesus Freak	dc Talk	-
N O V E M B E R	21	I Refuse to Be Lonely	Phyllis Hyman	-
N O V E M B E R	21	Live by Yo Rep	Three 6 Mafia	EP
N O V E M B E R	21	Livin' Proof	Group Home	Debut
N O V E M B E R	21	Mr. Smith	LL Cool J	-
N O V E M B E R	21	Natural Wonder	Stevie Wonder	Live
N O V E M B E R	21	Negatron	Voivod	-
N O V E M B E R	21	Tool Box	Aaron Tippin	-
N O V E M B E R	21	The Wheel Keeps on Rollin'	Asleep at the Wheel	-
N O V E M B E R	22	Amore	Toshinori Yonekura	-
N O V E M B E R	22	Loose	B'z	-
N O V E M B E R	27	Bizarre Fruit II	M People	-
N O V E M B E R	27	Eternal E	Eazy-E	Posthumous
N O V E M B E R	27	The Gallery	Dark Tranquillity	-
N O V E M B E R	?	Become the Other	Ozric Tentacles	-
N O V E M B E R	?	Desperate, Scared But Social	Emily's Sassy Lime	Debut
N O V E M B E R	?	Electronic Pleasure	N-Trance	Debut
N O V E M B E R	?	Grayfolded	Grateful Dead	Live
N O V E M B E R	?	I'm with Stupid	Aimee Mann	
N O V E M B E R	?	Izlamaphobia	Muslimgauze	-
N O V E M B E R	?	Scratch or Stitch	Melt-Banana	-
D E C E M B E R	1	The Blood-Splat Rating System	Powerman 5000	-
D E C E M B E R	1	Nothing from Nothing	Ayumi	EP; later went by full name, Ayumi Hamasaki
D E C E M B E R	4	Balto: Original Motion Picture Soundtrack	Various Artists	Soundtrack
D E C E M B E R	4	How Long Has This Been Going On	Van Morrison	-
D E C E M B E R	5	1990-Sick	Spice 1	-
D E C E M B E R	5	Merkin Ball	Pearl Jam featuring Neil Young	EP
D E C E M B E R	5	Saturday Morning: Cartoons' Greatest Hits	Various Artists	Compilation
D E C E M B E R	5	We Got It	Immature	-
D E C E M B E R	8	Cutterpillow	Eraserheads	-
D E C E M B E R	8	Last of the Ghetto Astronauts	Matthew Good Band	-
D E C E M B E R	8	The Return of The Aquabats	The Aquabats	-
D E C E M B E R	8	Taiyō no Shōnen	Hideaki Tokunaga	-
D E C E M B E R	10	Dancehall Dreamer	Pat Green	-
D E C E M B E R	12	Chronic Breakdown	Huck-A-Bucks	-
D E C E M B E R	12	Glyph	Harold Budd & Hector Zazou	-
D E C E M B E R	12	Lonesome Questions	Jack Ingram	-
D E C E M B E R	12	Xorcist	X-Raided	-
D E C E M B E R	14	Cibo Matto	Cibo Matto	-
D E C E M B E R	15	Final Bell / Ghost in the Ruins	Savatage	Live
D E C E M B E R	18	Low On Ice	Alec Empire	-
D E C E M B E R	18	Heat	Various Artists	Soundtrack
D E C E M B E R	20	B'z TV Style II Songless version	B'z	Compilation
D E C E M B E R	22	Di-Dar	Faye Wong	-
D E C E M B E R	?	Odoru Issunboushi	Ningen Isu	-
D E C E M B E R	?	Greed Killing	Napalm Death	EP

=== Release date unknown ===
- 12 – The Notwist
- 12 Before 9 - The Throes
- 12 Haunted Episodes - Graham Parker
- 25 Cents – The Flys
- 1979 – Joan Jett and the Blackhearts – EP
- Afterglow – Dr. John
- The Age of Electric – The Age of Electric
- Alien 4 – Hawkwind
- All That May Do My Rhyme - Roky Erickson
- Ask the Fish – Leftover Salmon
- Balaee Fi Zamany - Nawal El Zoghbi
- Bowery Electric - Bowery Electric
- The Breathing Shadow – Nightingale
- Caca Bonita (EP) – Papa Roach
- Can We Go Home Now – The Roches
- Carpet – Ceremonial Oath
- Carry the Day - Henry Threadgill
- Company of Strangers – Bad Company
- Coughing Up a Storm – Frenzal Rhomb
- Dawn – Danger Danger
- Devil Dog Road - Liar
- Devil in the Details – Saigon Kick
- Dreamtime Wisdom, Modern Time Vision - Wirrinyga Band
- En Route – Moebius & Plank
- Evil Stig – Joan Jett and The Gits
- Exotica 2000 - Korla Pandit
- Five Ways of Disappearing – Kendra Smith
- Fly – Sarah Brightman
- Gainsbourgsion! - April March
- A Glorious Lethal Euphoria - The Mermen
- Gush – Lowlife
- Hank Plays Cliff – Hank Marvin
- Human – Gary Numan
- A Hundred Lovers – Timbuk3
- Hyderomastgroningem – Ruins
- No Man's Land – Souls of Mischief
- حبك موت (I Love You Till Death) - Ahlam
- Intelligence - DJ Rap
- Lament – Rez Band
- Loituma - Loituma
- Looking Back – Toyah
- Ma Bassmahlak - Najwa Karam
- Nine Livez – Nine
- Obey – Brainbombs
- Ode to the Living Tree - Andrew Cyrille
- One Hour – Cluster
- Pain – Dub War
- Palabras - Omara Portuondo
- The Pastoral – Not Rustic – World of Their Greatest Hits – Country Teasers
- Project Infinity – Man or Astro-Man?
- The Remix Album – Prince Ital Joe & Marky Mark
- Rock!!!!! – Violent Femmes
- Rockabilly Filly - Rosie Flores
- Savage Poetry – Edguy
- Scent of Attraction - Patra
- Shag Tobacco – Gavin Friday
- Shampoo or Nothing - Shampoo
- Smokin – Kid Jonny Lang
- Soapy Water and Mister Marmalade – Sham 69
- Some Call It Godcore - Half Man Half Biscuit
- Spanaway - Seaweed
- Spirit of the Moment – Live at the Village Vanguard - Joshua Redman Quartet
- Strange Cargo Hinterland – William Orbit
- Super Compact Disc - Masonna
- That's What Love Songs Often Do – Fig Dish
- To Love and Be Loved - Anne Clark
- The New Album - Shweta Shetty
- ...Until Now – Stir
- Vainly Clutching at Phantom Limbs - Elf Power
- The Very Best of The Blues Brothers – The Blues Brothers (compilation)
- Wave of Popular Feeling – Groundswell
- White Zone – Psychedelic Warriors (Hawkwind)
- The Zero State – Arthur Loves Plastic

== Biggest hit singles ==
The following songs achieved the highest aggregated positions in the charts of 1995.

#	Artist	Title	Year	Country	Chart Entries
1	Coolio	Gangsta's Paradise	1995	(United States)	United Kingdom: 1 – October 1995; United States Billboard: 1 of 1995; The Netherlands: 1 – October 1995; Sweden: 1 – October 1995; Austria: 1 – November 1995; Switzerland: 1 – November 1995; Norway: 1 – October 1995; Italy: 1 of 1996; Germany: 1 – January 1996; Republic of Ireland: 1 – October 1995; New Zealand: 1 for 9 weeks October 1995; Australia: 1 for 13 weeks January 1996; France: 3 – October 1995; Poland: 3 – October 1995; Australia: 6 of 1995; United States Billboard: 11 of 1995; United States Cash Box: 12 of 1995; Germany: 16 of the 1990s; Scrobulate: 27 of rap; Pop Culture Madness: 31 of 1995; Global: 33 (5 million sold) – 1995; Europe: 48 of the 1990s; Acclaimed: 439
2	Shaggy	Boombastic	1995	(Jamaica)	UK 1 – September 1995, Italy 1 of 1995, Republic of Ireland 1 – September 1995, New Zealand 1 for 2 weeks September 1995, Australia 1 for 1 weeks May 1996, Norway 2 – September 1995, Germany 2 – September 1995, US BB 3 of 1995, Austria 3 – October 1995, Switzerland 3 – October 1995, Netherlands 4 – September 1995, Sweden 4 – September 1995, US BB 6 of 1995, POP 7 of 1995, France 8 – August 1995, Australia 8 of 1996, US CashBox 23 of 1995, Scrobulate 34 of dancehall, Germany 181 of the 1990s
3	Take That	Back for Good	1995	(United Kingdom)	UK 1 – April 1995, Sweden 1 – April 1995, Norway 1 – April 1995, Germany 1 – April 1995, Republic of Ireland 1 – March 1995, Australia 1 for 2 weeks August 1995, Netherlands 2 – April 1995, Switzerland 2 – April 1995, Austria 3 – May 1995, US BB 7 of 1995, Australia 9 of 1995, Poland 10 – January 1995, Italy 28 of 1995, RYM 53 of 1995, OzNet 126, Germany 128 of the 1990s
4	Michael Jackson	You Are Not Alone	1995	(United States)	UK 1 – September 1995, US BB 1 of 1995, Switzerland 1 – September 1995, Poland 1 – August 1995, Republic of Ireland 1 – September 1995, New Zealand 1 for 3 weeks September 1995, Austria 2 – September 1995, Germany 3 – September 1995, Sweden 5 – August 1995, Netherlands 6 – August 1995, Norway 9 – September 1995, US CashBox 13 of 1995, Australia 25 of 1995, Italy 45 of 1995, Germany 262 of the 1990s
5	U2	Hold Me, Thrill Me, Kiss Me, Kill Me	1995	(Republic of Ireland)	Norway 1 – June 1995, Poland 1 – January 1995, Republic of Ireland 1 – June 1995, New Zealand 1 for 1 weeks July 1995, Australia 1 for 6 weeks October 1995, UK 2 – June 1995, Austria 4 – July 1995, Switzerland 5 – July 1995, Netherlands 9 – June 1995, Germany 9 – July 1995, Sweden 15 – August 1995, US BB 16 of 1995, Australia 16 of 1995, Italy 27 of 1995, POP 59 of 1995, RYM 72 of 1995

== Top 40 Chart hit singles ==
Song title	Artist(s)	Release date(s)	US	UK	Highest chart position	Other Chart Performance(s)
"1st of tha Month"	Bone Thugs-N-Harmony	June 1995	14	15	7 (New Zealand)	4 (U.S. Billboard Hot Rap Songs) - 12 (U.S. Billboard Hot R&B/Hip-Hop Songs) - 46 (Netherlands [Single Top 100])
"3 Is Family"	Dana Dawson	June 1995	n/a	9	5 (Italy)	See chart performance entry
"'74–'75"	The Connells	August 1995	n/a	14	1 (Norway, Sweden)	See chart performance entry
"Adiemus"	Adiemus	November 1995	n/a	48	4 (Switzerland)	6 (Germany) - 7 (Austria) - 18 (Netherlands [Dutch Top 40])
"Agua Dulce, Agua Salá"	Julio Iglesias	April 1995	n/a	n/a	6 (Netherlands [Dutch Top 40])	1 (US Billboard Latin Pop Airplay) - 3 (US Billboard Hot Latin Songs) - 9 (Netherlands [Dutch Single Top 199])
"Alice (Who The X Is Alice?)"	Gompie	February 1995	n/a	17	1 (Belgium, Netherlands [Dutch Top 40], Netherlands [Single Top 100]	See chart performance entry
"All Over You"	Live	January 1995	n/a	48	18 (Canada)	See chart performance entry
"Alright"	Supergrass	July 1995	n/a	2	2 (United Kingdom)	See chart performance entry
"Angel (Ladadi O-Heyo)"	Jam & Spoon & Plavka	November 1995	n/a	26	2 (Netherlands [Dutch Top 40], Italy)	See chart performance entry
"Ants Marching"	Dave Matthews Band	September 1995	n/a	n/a	30 (Canada)	See chart performance entry
"Any Man of Mine"	Shania Twain	April 1995	31	118	31 (United States)	1 (Canada Country Tracks, US Billboard Hot Country Songs)
"Anything"	3T	December 1995	15	2	2 (Ireland, Sweden, United Kingdom)	See chart performance entry
"Anywhere Is"	Enya	November 1995	n/a	7	1 (Poland)	See chart performance entry
"Army of Me"	Björk	April 1995	n/a	10	1 (Iceland)	See chart performance entry
"As I Lay Me Down"	Sophie B. Hawkins	February 1995	6	24	6 (Canada)	See chart performance entry
"Axel F"	Clock	March 1995	n/a	7	5 (Netherlands [Dutch Top 40], Scotland)	See chart performance entry

=== Other Chart hit singles ===
- "Baby" – Brandy
- "Baby Baby" – Corona
- "Baby Boy" – Me & My
- "Back for Good" – Take That
- "Back in the U.K." – Scooter
- "Bang and Blame" – R.E.M.
- "Beautiful Life" – Ace of Base
- "Bedtime Story" – Madonna
- "Believe" – Elton John
- "Be My Lover" – La Bouche
- "Best Friend" – Brandy
- "Better Man" – Pearl Jam
- "Blessed" – Elton John
- "The Bomb! (These Sounds Fall into My Mind)" – Bucketheads
- "Breakfast at Tiffany's" – Deep Blue Something
- "Big Poppa" – The Notorious B.I.G.
- "Blind" – KoЯn
- "Boombastic" – Shaggy
- "Boom Boom Boom" – The Outhere Brothers
- "Buddy Holly" – Weezer
- "Bullet" – Fluke
- "Bullet with Butterfly Wings" – The Smashing Pumpkins
- "Candy Rain" – Soul For Real
- "Can't Stop Lovin' You" – Van Halen
- "Can't Stop Raving" - Dune
- "Captain Jack" – Captain Jack
- "Captive Heart" – Selena
- "Carnival" – Natalie Merchant
- "Catch a Fire" – Haddaway
- "Charmless Man" – Blur
- "Colors of the Wind" – Vanessa L. Williams
- "Come and Get Your Love" – Real McCoy
- "Common People" – Pulp
- "Connection" – Elastica
- "Conquest of Paradise" – Vangelis
- "Cotton-Eyed Joe" – Rednex
- "Country House" – Blur
- "Creep" – TLC
- "Dear Mama" – 2Pac
- "December" – Collective Soul
- "Dieu m'a donné la foi" – Ophélie Winter
- "Diggin' on You" – TLC
- "Digging the Grave" – Faith No More
- "Disco 2000" – Pulp
- "Do What's Good For Me" – 2 Unlimited
- "Do You Really Want Me (Show Respect)" – Robyn
- "Don't Give Me Your Life" – Alex Party
- "Don't You Know" – Pandora
- "Don't Stop (Wiggle Wiggle)" – The Outhere Brothers
- "Don't Take It Personal (Just One of Dem Days)" – Monica
- "Down by the Water" – PJ Harvey
- "Dreamer" – Livin' Joy
- "Dreaming of You" – Selena
- "Dub-I-Dub" – Me & My
- "Earth Song" – Michael Jackson
- "Electric" – Leila K
- "Everlasting Love" – Gloria Estefan
- "Exhale (Shoop Shoop)" – Whitney Houston
- "Fairground" – Simply Red
- "Fake Plastic Trees" – Radiohead
- "Fantasy" – Mariah Carey
- "Father and Son" – Boyzone
- "Feel Me Flow" – Naughty by Nature
- "Find Me (Odyssey to Anyoona)" – Jam & Spoon & Plavka
- "The First the Last Eternity (Till the End)" – Snap!
- "Flat Top" – Goo Goo Dolls
- "Fly Away" – Haddaway
- "Flying High" – Captain Hollywood Project
- "Freak Like Me" – Adina Howard
- "Fred Come to Bed" – E-Rotic
- "Freedom" - DJ BoBo
- "Freek'n You" - Jodeci
- "Gangsta's Paradise" – Coolio & L.V.
- "Generation of Love" – Masterboy
- "A Girl Like You" – Edwyn Collins
- "Gold" – Prince
- "Good" – Better Than Ezra
- "Grind" – Alice in Chains
- "Hakuna Matata" – Jimmy Cliff & Lebo M
- "Hand In My Pocket" – Alanis Morissette
- "Hard as a Rock" – AC/DC
- "Have You Ever Really Loved A Woman?" – Bryan Adams
- "Heaven for Everyone" – Queen
- "Here I Go" – 2 Unlimited
- "Herz an Herz" – Blümchen
- "Hey Lover" – LL Cool J & Boyz II Men
- "Hey Man, Nice Shot" – Filter
- "Higher State of Consciousness" - Josh Wink
- "Hold Me, Thrill Me, Kiss Me, Kill Me" – U2
- "Hook" – Blues Traveler
- "How Deep Is Your Love" – Portrait
- "Human Nature" – Madonna
- "Hurt" – Nine Inch Nails
- "I Alone" – Live
- "I Believe" – Blessid Union of Souls
- "I Can Love You Like That" – All-4-One
- "I Could Fall in Love" – Selena
- "I Got a Girl" – Tripping Daisy
- "I Got 5 on It" – Luniz & Michael Marshall
- "I Got Id" – Pearl Jam & Neil Young
- "I Hate U" – Prince
- "I Know" – Dionne Farris
- "I Wanna B With U" – Fun Factory
- "I Wanna Be A Hippy" – Technohead
- "I Want You" – Madonna
- "I Wish" – Skee-Lo
- "I'd Lie for You (And That's the Truth)" – Meat Loaf
- "If I Wanted To" – Melissa Etheridge
- "If You Love Me" – Brownstone
- "If You Only Let Me In" – MN8
- "If You Think You're Lonely Now" – K-Ci Hailey
- "I'll Be There for You" – The Rembrandts
- "I'll Be There for You/You're All I Need to Get By" – Method Man & Mary J. Blige
- "I'm Getting Used To You" – Selena
- "In the House of Stone and Light" – Martin Page
- "In the Summertime" – Shaggy
- "Independent Love Song" – Scarlet
- "Inseparables" – Lynda Thomas
- "Inside Out" – Culture Beat
- "It's Cool Man" - XXL & Peter Steiner
- "It's Oh So Quiet" – Björk
- "It's Midnight Cinderella" – Garth Brooks
- "I've Got a Little Something for You" – MN8
- "Je sais pas" – Céline Dion
- "Julia Says" – Wet Wet Wet
- "Just" – Radiohead
- "Just a Girl" – No Doubt
- "Just Like Anyone" – Soul Asylum
- "Just tah Let U Know" – Eazy-E
- "Keep Their Heads Ringin'" – Dr. Dre
- "Key to My Life" – Boyzone
- "Kiss From A Rose" – Seal
- "Knockin'" – Double Vision
- "Laila" – Blue System
- "La La La Hey Hey" – The Outhere Brothers
- "Last Christmas" - Whigfield
- "Leave Home" – The Chemical Brothers
- "Let Her Cry" – Hootie & the Blowfish
- "Let It Rain" – East 17
- "Lick It" – 20 Fingers
- "Life Is Sweet" – The Chemical Brothers & Tim Burgess
- "Lie to me" – Bon Jovi
- "Life's a Bitch" – Nas
- "Lightning Crashes" – Live
- "Like a Rolling Stone" - The Rolling Stones
- "Love Is All Around" – DJ BoBo
- "Love Me for a Reason" – Boyzone
- "Lucky Love" – Ace of Base
- "Lump" – The Presidents of the United States of America
- "Macarena" – Los del Río
- "Marta's Song" – Deep Forest
- "Mief (Nimm mich jetzt, auch wenn ich stinke)" – Die Doofen
- "Magic Carpet Ride" - Mighty Dub Katz
- "Misery" – Soul Asylum
- "Mis-Shapes" – Pulp
- "Missing" – Everything But The Girl
- "Missing My Baby" – Selena
- "Miss Sarajevo" – Passengers
- "Misunderstood Man" – Cliff Richard
- "Mouth" – Merril Bainbridge
- "Move Your Ass!" – Scooter
- "My Friends" – Red Hot Chili Peppers
- "My Love Is for Real" – Paula Abdul
- "Name" – Goo Goo Dolls
- "Never Forget" – Take That
- "No Limit" - Irene Moors & De Smurfen
- "No More I Love You's" – Annie Lennox
- "Not Over Yet" – Grace
- "Ode to My Family" – The Cranberries
- "Old Pop in an Oak" – Rednex
- "One Man in My Heart" – Human League
- "One More Chance (Remix)" – The Notorious B.I.G.
- "One of Us" – Joan Osborne
- "Only One" – Goo Goo Dolls
- "Only Wanna Be With You" – Hootie & the Blowfish
- "Original" – Leftfield & Toni Halliday
- "Over My Shoulder" – Mike + the Mechanics
- "Player's Anthem" – Junior M.A.F.I.A.
- "Poison" - The Prodigy
- "Pour que tu m'aimes encore" – Céline Dion
- "Push the Feeling On" – Nightcrawlers
- "Reach Up (Papa's Got a Brand New Pigbag)" - Perfecto Allstarz
- "Red Light Special" - TLC
- "Renegade Master" – Wildchild
- "Respect" – Alliance Ethnik
- "Rev It Up" – Jab Jab
- "Right in the Night" – Jam & Spoon & Plavka
- "Right Type of Mood" – Herbie
- "River of Deceit" – Mad Season
- "Rock and Roll Is Dead" – Lenny Kravitz
- "Roll to Me" – Del Amitri
- "Roll with It" – Oasis
- "Run-Around" – Blues Traveler
- "Runaway" – Janet Jackson
- "Scatman (Ski-Ba-Bop-Ba-Dop-Bop)" – Scatman John
- "Scatman's World" – Scatman John
- "Scream" – Michael Jackson & Janet Jackson
- "Secret Garden" – Bruce Springsteen
- "Set You Free" – N-Trance
- "Sex on the Phone" – E-Rotic
- "She" – Green Day
- "She's a River" – Simple Minds
- "She's Every Woman" – Garth Brooks
- "Shook Ones, Part II" – Mobb Deep
- "Shut Up (and Sleep with Me)" – Sin With Sebastian
- "Shy Guy" – Diana King
- "Sick Of Myself" – Matthew Sweet
- "Sie ist weg" – Die Fantastischen Vier
- "Simple & Funky" - Alliance Ethnik
- "Snuff the Punk" – P.O.D.
- "So Good" – Boyzone
- "Someday I'll Be Saturday Night" – Bon Jovi
- "Something for the Pain" – Bon Jovi
- "Some Might Say" – Oasis
- "Sorted for E's & Wizz" – Pulp
- "Stayin' Alive" – N-Trance
- "Strange World" – Ké
- "Stutter" – Elastica
- "Surrender Your Love" – Nightcrawlers
- "Sympathy for the Devil" – Guns N' Roses
- "Take a Bow" – Madonna
- "Te Extraño, Te Olvido, Te Amo" – Ricky Martin
- "Tell Me" - Groove Theory
- "Tell Me When" – The Human League
- "The First Cut Is the Deepest" - Papa Dee
- "The World I Know" - Collective soul
- "There Is a party" – DJ BoBo
- "Think of You" – Whigfield
- "This Ain't a Love Song" – Bon Jovi
- "This Is A Call" – Foo Fighters
- "This Is How We Do It" – Montell Jordan
- "This Time I'm Free" – Dr. Alban
- "Three in the Power of One" – P.O.D.
- "Thunder" – East 17
- "Til I Hear It from You" – Gin Blossoms
- "Tomorrow" – Silverchair
- "Too Hot" – Coolio
- "Tosh" – Fluke
- "Total Eclipse of the Heart" – Nicki French
- "Try Me Out" – Corona
- "Turn On, Tune In, Cop Out" – Freak Power
- "Two Can Play That Game" – Bobby Brown
- "The Universal" – Blur
- "Vow" – Garbage"
- "Walking in Memphis" – Cher
- "Warped" – Red Hot Chili Peppers
- "Water Runs Dry" – Boyz II Men
- "Waterfalls" – TLC
- "Whatever" – Oasis
- "What'll I Do" – Janet Jackson
- "When I Come Around" – Green Day
- "When Love & Hate Collide" – Def Leppard
- "Where the Wild Roses Grow" – Nick Cave and the Bad Seeds & Kylie Minogue
- "Who Can I Run To" – Xscape
- "Whoops Now" – Janet Jackson
- "Wish You Were Here" – Rednex
- "Wonderful Days" - Charly Lownoise and Mental Theo
- "Wonderwall" – The Mike Flowers Pops
- "Wonderwall" – Oasis
- "The World I Know" – Collective Soul
- "XXL" - Mylène Farmer
- "Yeha-Noha" – Sacred Spirit
- "You Are Not Alone" – Michael Jackson
- "You Belong to Me" – JK & Shena
- "You Oughta Know" – Alanis Morissette
- "You'll See" – Madonna
- "Your Loving Arms" – Billie Ray Martin
- "Zombie" – The Cranberries

== Notable singles ==
Song title	Artist(s)	Release date(s)	Other Chart Performance(s)
"Alright"	Supergrass	July 1995	See chart performance entry

=== Other Notable singles ===
- "Da Funk" - Daft Punk
- "Radar" - Morphine

== Top ten best albums of the year ==
The following ten albums from 1995 are the highest rated, as per aggregate ratings compiled from over 33,000 different "greatest album" charts. Results accurate as of April 2018.

1. Radiohead – The Bends
2. Oasis – (What's the Story) Morning Glory?
3. The Smashing Pumpkins – Mellon Collie and the Infinite Sadness
4. Pulp – Different Class
5. Alanis Morissette – Jagged Little Pill
6. Björk – Post
7. GZA – Liquid Swords
8. Elliott Smith – Elliott Smith
9. P.J. Harvey – To Bring You My Love
10. Pavement – Wowee Zowee

== Classical music ==
- Osvaldas Balakauskas – Requiem
- Sally Beamish – Viola Concerto
- Luciano Berio – Sequenza XII
- Harrison Birtwistle – Panic (premiered at Last Night of the Proms)
- Elliott Carter – String Quartet No.5
- Mario Davidovsky – Violin Concertino
- Mario Davidovsky – Flashbacks for flute/piccolo/alto flute, clarinet/bass clarinet, violin, violoncello, piano, and percussion
- Frédéric Durieux – Départ for clarinet
- Ludovico Einaudi – Chatrang Overture
- Lorenzo Ferrero
  - Seven Seconds, for clarinet, violin, and piano
  - Shadow Lines, for flute and live electronics
- Philip Glass
  - Saxophone Quartet
  - String Sextet
  - Melodies for saxophone
  - Symphony No. 3, for string orchestra
  - Concerto for Saxophone Quartet and Orchestra
- Andrew Glover – Fractured Vistas
- Simeon ten Holt
  - Schaduw noch Prooi, for 2 pianos
  - Eadem sed Aliter, for piano
- Houtaf Khoury
  - Concerto for basset horn and orchestra
  - Concerto for soprano saxophone, 6 percussionists and string orchestra
- Wojciech Kilar – How Will I Calm Myself, for voice and piano
- Ulrich Leyendecker – Violin Concerto
- Theo Loevendie – Piano Concerto
- Krzysztof Penderecki – Violin Concerto No. 2 Metamorphosen
- Karl Aage Rasmussen – Three Friends, for orchestra
- John Serry Sr. – Concerto For Free Bass Accordion, piano transcription #1
- Stanisław Skrowaczewski – Passacaglia Immaginaria
- Michael Tippett – The Rose Lake
- Malcolm Williamson – A Year of Birds

== Opera ==
- Michael Easton – The Selfish Giant (for children)
- Stewart Wallace – Harvey Milk

== Musical theater ==
- Dracula – opened on 13 October in Prague, starring Daniel Hůlka
- Hello, Dolly! – Broadway revival
- How to Succeed in Business Without Really Trying – Broadway revival
- Kristina från Duvemåla – opened on 7 October in Malmö, Sweden
- Victor/Victoria – Broadway production opened at the Marquis Theatre and ran for 734 performances

== Musical films ==
- Akropol
- Arabian Knight – animated feature
- Bye Bye Birdie
- Empire Records
- Georgia
- Gesualdo: Death for Five Voices
- Monster Mash
- Pocahontas – animated feature
- Small Wonders
- The Show
- Whatever Will Be, Will Be
- Whisper of the Heart

== Births ==
- January 1 – Poppy, American singer/songwriter, ambient music composer, and YouTuber
- January 3 – Jisoo, South Korean singer, actress, and member of girl group Blackpink
- January 5
  - Whindersson Nunes, Brazilian YouTuber and musician
  - Nico Marley, American footballer
- January 7
  - Leslie Grace, American singer
  - Jessica Darrow, American singer and actor
- January 8 – Victoria Duffield, Canadian singer and actor
- January 12 - Nathy Peluso, Argentine singer, songwriter, dancer and pedagogue.
- January 17 - Heather Baron-Gracie, British singer, songwriter, and musician
- January 20 – Joey Bada$$, American rapper
- January 22 – Lexa, Brazilian singer, songwriter, and dancer
- January 27 – Raz Fresco, Canadian rapper and producer
- January 30 – Thia Megia, American singer
- February 3 – Orla Gartland, Irish singer, songwriter, YouTuber, guitarist, multi-instrumentalist, and activist
- February 7 – Masha Mnjoyan, Armenian singer
- February 10 — Archie Madekwe, British Actor
- February 12 – Daniela Aedo, Mexican actress
- February 15 – Megan Thee Stallion, American rapper, musician, and producer
- February 16 – Denzel Curry, American rapper, singer and songwriter (Billie Eilish)
- February 21 – Giveon, American singer-songwriter
- February 25 – Francesca Michielin, Italian singer-songwriter
- March 2 - Klaasje Meijer, Belgian singer (K3)
- March 3 – Maine Mendoza, Filipina entertainer
- March 5 – Lolo Zouaï, French-born American R&B and pop musician
- March 6 – Aimyon, Japanese singer and songwriter
- March 11 – Sasha Alex Sloan, American singer-songwriter
- March 13 – Zella Day, American singer, songwriter and musician
- March 25 – Nick McCarthy, Irish rugby union player
- April 5 – Daniel Caesar, Canadian singer-songwriter RNB/soul musician
- April 6 – Tomberlin, American musician and singer-songwriter
- April 11 – Dodie Clark, British singer-songwriter, musician, author and entertainer
- April 17 – Wheein, singer and member of girl group MAMAMOO
- April 19
  - Arizona Zervas, American singer-rapper-songwriter
  - Madison Love, American songwriter and singer
- April 21 – Madison Love, Japanese American singer-songwriter, producer and musician
- April 24
  - Kehlani, American singer songwriter
  - Ludmilla, Brazilian singer and songwriter
- April 26
  - Lorenzo Fragola, Italian singer
  - Daniel Padilla, Filipino actor and singer
- April 27 – Sarah Close, British singer-songwriter, YouTuber
- April 28 – Melanie Martinez, American singer, songwriter, photographer, and director
- May 2 – Lucy Dacus, American singer-songwriter and producer (member of Boygenius)
- May 3 – Zach Sobiech, American singer-songwriter and musician (d. 2013)
- May 4 – Shameik Moore, American actor, singer, and dancer
- May 9
  - Devito, Serbian singer
  - Shaboozey, American rapper, singer, songwriter, and record producer
- May 10
  - Yoan Garneau, Canadian singer-songwriter
  - Aya Nakamura, French Malian singer-songwriter
- May 11 - Nilüfer Yanya, British singer, songwriter and musician
- May 24 – Kiiara, American singer-songwriter
- May 25 – Rei Ami, South Korean-American singer and rapper
- June 1 – Matthew Lewin, American producer (Magdalena Bay)
- June 4 – Shiori Tamai, Japanese singer
- June 5 – Troye Sivan, South African-Australian singer-songwriter, actor, and YouTuber
- June 8 – Tom Grennan, English singer-songwriter
- June 11 – Tems, Nigerian singer
- June 14 – Alexandra Savior, American singer
- June 15 – Tash Sultana, Australian singer-songwriter and multi-instrumentalist
- June 20 – Serayah, American actress, model and singer
- June 23 – Lauren Aquilina, English singer-songwriter, musician, music producer
- June 26
  - Reema Major, Sudanese-Canadian rapper
  - Mitch James, New Zealand independent musician
- June 28 – Demi-Leigh Tebow, South African model and beauty queen
- June 30 – bbno$, Canadian-Armenian rapper, singer, and songwriter
- July 1
  - Taeyong, South Korean rapper, dancer and member of NCT
  - Hoài Lâm, Vietnamese pop singer and actor
- July 2
  - Ruth B, Canadian singer-songwriter
  - Shirley Setia, Indian singer
- July 4 – Post Malone, American rapper, singer-songwriter, and guitarist
- July 7 – Anson Lo, Hong Kong singer (MIRROR)
- July 11 – Tyler Medeiros, Canadian singer-songwriter and dancer
- July 12 – Yohio, Swedish singer and songwriter active in Japan
- July 13 – The Japanese House, aka Amber Bain, an English singer-songwriter, musician, multi-instrumentalist
- July 15 – Elyar, Azerbaijani-English musician, pop star, music producer, and singer-songwriter (Collaborator with Leadley)
- July 16 - CKay, Nigerian singer-songwriter, musician, and record producer
- July 18 - Sydnie Christmas, English singer and actress
- July 22
  - Marília Mendonça, Brazilian singer and songwriter (d. 2021)
  - Armaan Malik, Indian singer and songwriter
- July 23 – Hwasa, South Korean singer-songwriter, dancer, and member of MAMAMOO
- July 31 - Lil Uzi Vert, American rapper
- August 1 – Derrick Monasterio, Filipino actor, dancer and singer
- August 2 – Vikkstar123, English DJ and influencer
- August 4 – Jessica Sanchez, American singer
- August 8
  - Malin Reitan, Norwegian singer
  - S.Coups, South Korean rapper, singer and member of Seventeen
- August 11 – Tierra Whack, American rapper, singer, and songwriter
- August 14 – Montaigne, Australian musician, singer and Twitch streamer
- August 16 – Hjalmer Larsen, Danish singer
- August 22 – Dua Lipa, British singer-songwriter
- August 24 – Wenwen Han, Chinese child actress and violinist
- August 29 – Gud, Swedish DJ and producer best known as a member of rapper Yung Lean's Stockholm-based group Sad Boys
- September 8
  - Jeremy Lee, Hong Kong singer (MIRROR)
  - Jay Weinberg, American drummer formerly with Slipknot
- September 18 – Megan Lee, Korean-American singer-songwriter and actress
- September 22 – Nayeon, South Korean singer and member of TWICE
- September 25
  - Ryan Beatty, American singer
  - Sofía Reyes, Mexican singer-songwriter and actress
- September 29 – Julien Baker, American singer and guitarist (member of Boygenius)
- October 4
  - Caitlyn Shadbolt, Australian singer-songwriter
  - Jeonghan, South Korean singer and member of Seventeen
  - Mikolas Josef, Czech singer-songwriter
- October 13 – Jimin, South Korean singer-songwriter, dancer, and member of BTS
- October 14 – Jeleel, American rapper
- October 19 – Enca Haxhia, Albanian singer
- October 21
  - Doja Cat, American singer, rapper and songwriter
  - Shannon Magrane, American singer
- October 26 – Yuta Nakamoto, Japanese singer and member of NCT
- October 28 - Mia Wray, Australian pop singer-songwriter and musician
- November 6 – Anja Nissen, Danish-Australian singer, songwriter, dancer and actress
- November 19 – Melinda Ademi, Kosovo-Albanian musician
- November 20 – Michael Clifford, Australian musician, best known as the lead guitarist of the pop rock band 5 Seconds of Summer.
- November 29 – Laura Marano, American actress and singer
- December 3 – Angèle, Belgian singer-songwriter
- December 6 – Tai Verdes, American singer
- December 15 – Leadley, British musician, singer-songwriter, activist and YouTuber (collaborator with Elyar)
- December 17 – Tkay Maidza, Zimbabwean-born Australian singer-songwriter and rapper
- December 18 – Mica Tenenbaum, Argentine singer (Magdalena Bay)
- December 23 – Jawny, American singer, songwriter, and producer.
- December 27 – Caroline Pennell, American singer-songwriter
- December 29 – Ross Lynch, American singer (R5, The Driver Era)
- December 30
  - V, South Korean singer-songwriter, actor, and member of BTS
  - Dominic Fike, American singer- songwriter, multi instrumentalist, actor and rapper
  - Joshua Hong, American singer and member of Seventeen
- unknown
  - Jerskin Fendrix, English musician
  - Ivy Adara, Australian singer and composer

== Deaths ==
- January 1 – Ted Hawkins, soul blues singer-songwriter, 58
- January 24 – David Cole, producer (C+C Music Factory), 32
- January 31 – George Abbott US librettist and director, 107
- February 6 – Art Taylor, jazz drummer, 65
- February 12 – Tony Secunda, Marc Bolan's former manager, 54 (heart attack)
- February 18
  - Bob Stinson, guitarist (The Replacements), 35 (complications caused by drug and alcohol abuse)
  - Denny Cordell, English record producer, 51
- February 23 – Melvin Franklin, The Temptations, 52 (brain seizure)
- March 5 – Vivian Stanshall, eccentric British musician, 51 (house fire)
- March 9 – Ingo Schwichtenberg, Helloween, 29 (suicide)
- March 16 – Heinrich Sutermeister, Swiss composer, 84
- March 17 – Sunnyland Slim, blues pianist, 88
- March 26 – Eazy-E, rapper (N.W.A.) and co-founder of Ruthless Records, 30 (AIDS)
- March 28 – Mogens Ellegaard, accordionist, 60
- March 29
  - Jimmy McShane, singer (Baltimora) (AIDS)
  - Roland Wolf, keyboardist (Nick Cave and the Bad Seeds, Einstürzende Neubauten), 29 or 30 (car accident)
- March 30 – Paul A. Rothchild, American record producer, 59
- March 31 – Selena, singer, 23 (murdered)
- April 4 – Priscilla Lane, US singer and actress, 79 (lung cancer)
- April 6 – Delroy Wilson, reggae artist, 46 (cirrhosis of the liver)
- April 14 – Burl Ives, singer and actor, 85
- April 25 – Ginger Rogers, US actress, dancer and singer, 83
- May 6 – Barbarito Diez, Cuban singer and bandleader, 85
- May 8 – Teresa Teng, singer, 42
- May 16 – Lola Flores, Spanish singer and dancer, 72
- May 25 – Dick Curless, country singer. 63
- June 4 – Ernest Bornemann, jazz musician and critic, 80
- June 12 – Arturo Benedetti Michelangeli pianist, 75
- June 14 – Rory Gallagher, Irish blues/rock guitarist, 47 (complications from liver transplant)
- June 26 – Lucia Bercescu-Țurcanu, Romanian-born American soprano, 84
- June 30
  - Phyllis Hyman, R&B, soul and jazz singer, 45 (suicide by overdose of barbiturates)
  - Nazariy Yaremchuk, Ukrainian singer, 43
- July 1 – Wolfman Jack, disc jockey, 57
- July 2 – Zdeněk Košler, conductor, 67
- July 8 – Günter Bialas, composer, 87
- July 23 – Miklós Rózsa, film score composer, 88
- July 25 – Charlie Rich, country singer and musician, 62
- July 28 – Eddie Hinton, songwriter and session musician, 51
- August 9 – Jerry Garcia, Grateful Dead, 53 (diabetes-related)
- August 11
  - Allan McCarthy, Canadian singer of Men Without Hats, 38
  - Herbert Sumsion, English church musician, 96
- August 16 – Bobby DeBarge, lead singer of Switch, 39 (AIDS)
- August 18 – Alan Dell BBC Radio 2 disc jockey, 71
- August 19
  - John Gilmore, jazz saxophonist, 63
  - Pierre Schaeffer, composer and pioneer of Musique concrète, 85
- August 23 – Dwayne Goettel, industrial keyboard player (Skinny Puppy), 31 (drug overdose)
- August 26 – Ronnie White, the Miracles, co-writer of the Temptations hit "My Girl" (with Smokey Robinson), 57 leukemia.
- August 30 – Sterling Morrison, The Velvet Underground guitarist, 53 (Non-Hodgkin lymphoma)
- September 5
  - Salil Chowdhury, Indian film composer and poet, 71
  - Benyamin Sueb, Indonesian actor, comedian and singer, 56 (heart attack)
- September 27 – Alison Steele, American disc jockey, 58
- October 19 – Don Cherry, jazz trumpeter, 58 (liver cancer)
- October 21
  - Maxene Andrews, singer, member of The Andrews Sisters, 79
  - Shannon Hoon, lead singer of group Blind Melon, 28 (drug overdose)
  - Hans Helfritz, German composer, 93
- October 26 – Gorni Kramer, Italian bandleader and songwriter, 82
- October 31
  - Alan Bush, composer, pianist and conductor, 94
  - Erika Morini, violinist, 91
- November 2 – Florence Greenberg, music executive and producer, 82
- November 3 – Isang Yun (Yun I-sang), composer, 78
- November 7 – Jerry Daniels, The Ink Spots, 79
- November 8 – Ion Baciu, conductor, 64
- November 17 – Alan Hull, singer-songwriter and founder of Lindisfarne, 50 (heart thrombosis)
- November 21
  - Peter Grant, manager of The Yardbirds, Led Zeppelin, Bad Company, 60 (myocardial infarction)
  - Matthew Ashman, guitarist of Adam and the Ants, Bow Wow Wow, 35
- November 23 – Junior Walker, R&B and soul musician, 64
- November 26 – David Briggs, record producer, 51
- December 10 – Darren Robinson, rapper (The Fat Boys), 28
- December 25
  - Dean Martin, singer and actor, 78 (cancer)
  - Nicolas Slonimsky, Russian-born conductor and composer, 101
- December 27 – Shura Cherkassky, American classical pianist, 86
- December 29 – Hans Henkemans Dutch composer, 82

== Awards ==
- The following artists are inducted into the Rock and Roll Hall of Fame: The Allman Brothers Band, Al Green, Janis Joplin, Led Zeppelin, Martha and the Vandellas, Neil Young and Frank Zappa
- Inductees of the GMA Gospel Music Hall of Fame include Charles Wesley (writer of "Hark The Herald Angels Sing")
- Udit Narayan wins the Filmfare Best Male Playback Award.
- Tetsuya Komuro (producer) & trf win the Japan Record Award for "Overnight Sensation"t the 37th Japan Record Awards.

=== Grammy Awards ===
- Grammy Awards of 1995

=== Country Music Association Awards ===
- 1995 Country Music Association Awards

=== Eurovision Song Contest ===
- Eurovision Song Contest 1995

=== Mercury Music Prize ===
- Dummy – Portishead wins.

=== MTV Video Music Awards ===
- 1995 MTV Video Music Awards

== Charts ==
- List of Billboard Hot 100 number ones of 1995
- 1995 in British music#Charts
- List of Oricon number-one singles of 1995

Triple J Hottest 100
Main article: Triple J Hottest 100, 1995

== See also ==
- 1995 in British music
- Record labels established in 1995
