= Rap do Silva =

1995 song by MC Bob Rum

Rap do Silva (Portuguese for "The Silva Rap") is a 1995 funk carioca song by Brazilian rapper MC Bob Rum. The track became a scene classic in Rio de Janeiro and is often described retrospectively as a socially conscious narrative about stigma, police violence, and everyday life in the favela communities.

== Background ==
The song was created in the mid-1990s during the first major wave of funk carioca's popularity in Rio de Janeiro. It initially spread through bailes funk (funk parties), mixtapes, and compilation albums. In later retrospectives, "Rap do Silva" has been cited as one of the defining funk songs of the decade and a "classic" of the genre. In the lyrics, the common Portuguese surname "Silva" functions as a symbol for marginalized favela residents, while the text employs a narrative style reminiscent of reportage to address prejudice and state repression.

== Release and reception ==
The song became widely known through the popular compilation Rap Brasil Vol. 2, released by Som Livre in 1995, which played a key role in bringing the track to national attention. In Brazilian media and retrospective anthologies, "Rap do Silva" is frequently listed as a benchmark of 1990s funk. Journalist Júlio Ludemir included it in his book 101 Funks You Must Hear Before You Die (101 funks que você tem que ouvir antes de morrer), which canonized major works of the genre.

== Commercial success ==
Rap Brasil Vol. 2 achieved platinum status in Brazil, with industry reports attributing much of its success to the popularity of "Rap do Silva." Contemporary press coverage highlighted the song's heavy radio rotation and recurring inclusion on numerous funk compilations throughout the late 1990s.

In the history of funk carioca, "Rap do Silva" is often seen as a key transitional piece, marking the genre's shift from predominantly hedonistic party tracks to more socially aware storytelling. Cultural features and essays continue to reference it as a touchstone for understanding the evolution of funk carioca during the 1980s and 1990s.

== Music video, reinterpretations, and legacy ==
To mark its 20th anniversary, an official music video was released, updating the story of the song and reflecting on its legacy within the funk scene. The 2013 documentary A História de um Silva ("The Story of a Silva") also explored the song's context, reception, and social dimension, framing it as a cross-generational reference point in Rio's funk culture. Retrospective overviews of four decades of funk have consistently listed "Rap do Silva" among the genre's 40 defining hits.
