= Example (album) =

Studio album by For Squirrels
- Released: October 3, 1995
- Recorded: 1995
- Studio: Compass Point, Nassau, Bahamas and Criteria, Miami, Florida
- Genre: Alternative rock, post-grunge
- Length: 42:17
- Label: Sony
- Producer: Nick Launay

For Squirrels chronology
Baypath Rd (1994)	Example (1995)

Singles from Example
- 1. "Mighty K.C." Released: late 1995

Example is the second studio album released by For Squirrels. It was produced, engineered and mixed by Nick Launay. It was For Squirrels' only major label record, as lead singer John Vigliatura and bassist Bill White died when the band's van blew a tire and crashed less than a month before Example's release.

Despite the death of half the band, the two surviving members chose to release the album as scheduled. The band released "Mighty K.C." as the only single from the album. The song peaked at No. 15 on the Billboard Modern Rock Tracks chart on the chart dated January 26, 1996. It also peaked at No. 70 on the Billboard Hot 100 Airplay chart on the chart dated January 27, 1996.

The album did not gain mainstream popularity, reaching only No. 171 on the Billboard 200.

Travis Tooke and Jack Griego would form a new band, Subrosa. They released an album, Never Bet the Devil Your Head, in 1997.

== Critical reception ==
Professional ratings
Review scores
Source	Rating
AllMusic	3/5 stars
The Encyclopedia of Popular Music	3/5 stars
MusicHound Rock: The Essential Album Guide	3.5/5 stars
Orlando Sentinel	3/5 stars

The Austin Chronicle called the album "a great approximation of early R.E.M. that would fit nicely in a set with the Gin Blossoms, Toad the Wet Sprocket, and Sponge." Trouser Press wrote that Example shows "that [the band] was a vibrant musical force with a fully realized sound and a knack for explosive, out-of-the-ordinary dynamics."

== Track listing ==
All songs by For Squirrels

1. "8:02 PM" - 3:28
2. "Orangeworker" - 4:24
3. "Superstar" - 3:20
4. "Mighty K.C." - 5:39
5. "Under Smithville" - 4:35
6. "Long Live the King" - 3:15
7. "The Immortal Dog and Pony Show" - 4:02
8. "Stark Pretty" - 3:52
9. "Disenchanted" - 6:44
10. "Eskimo Sandune" - 3:03
