= Refusal Fossil =

Studio album by Ruins
- Released: 1997
- Recorded: Showboat, Tokyo, Japan
- Genre: Experimental rock; noise rock; progressive rock
- Length: 55:37
- Label: Skin Graft Records
- Producer: Ruins

Ruins chronology
Hyderomastgroningem (1995)	Refusal Fossil (1997)	Vrresto (1998)

Professional ratings
Review scores
Source	Rating
AllMusic	3/5 stars

Refusal Fossil is the sixth album by Ruins, released in 1997 through Skin Graft Records. In 2007, Skin Graft released a special edition with five extra tracks, easily identified by a different text font for the band name and title.

== Track listing ==
No.	Title	Length
1.	"Refusal Fossil"	3:39
2.	"Uskilsdos Zaimm"	3:10
3.	"Stara Planina"	2:53
4.	"Eccentric Ditch"	2:15
5.	"Etymology"	2:03
6.	"Empty Hands"	0:55
7.	"Der Strudel"	5:21
8.	"Still Life"	3:19
9.	"7th Dimension"	2:28
10.	"Faux Numero"	1:08
11.	"Calnac"	2:43
12.	"Heraklion"	3:20
13.	"Misconduction"	2:33
14.	"Reckless Stone"	2:42
15.	"You Know What You Like"	2:45
16.	"Heaven and Hell"	3:15
17.	"Hyderomastgroningem"	1:22
18.	"Ramification"	1:46
19.	"Burning Stone"	0:52
20.	"Plexus"	1:54
21.	"Dhaskrive"	0:58
22.	"Gravestone"	3:01
23.	"Del Fanci Kant"	7:03
24.	"Infect"	6:49
25.	"Prog Rock Medley"	3:19

Tracks 13–17 were added for the 2007 special edition release.
Tracks 1–16 were recorded in Koenji and Asagaya, 1995–1997.
Tracks 17–26 were recorded live at Showboat, Tokyo on February 7, 1997.

== Personnel ==
Ruins

- Hisashi Sasaki – vocals, bass guitar
- Tatsuya Yoshida – vocals, drums
- Ryuichi Masuda – bass guitar (tracks 8, 10, 11)
- Naruyoshi Kikuchi - alto saxophone (tracks 17–21)
- Emi Eleonola - vocals (track 22)
- Seiichi Yamamoto - guitar (track 23)
- Kenichi Oguchi – keyboards (track 24)

Production and additional personnel

- Ruins – production
- Jim O'Rourke – assistant producer
