= Indigo Planet Records =

- Industry: Music & entertainment
- Genre: Pop, Alternative, Rock, Singer/Songwriter
- Founded: 2005
- Founder: Dave Kosciolek
- Headquarters: New York, NY, United States
- Products: Music & entertainment
- Website: indigoplanetrecords.com

Indigo Planet Records (IPR) is an independent US record label founded in 2005 that currently has satellite offices in NYC, the Jersey Shore, St. Augustine, and Los Angeles. IPR has worked with a number of local, regional, and national acts, through label signings, showcases, and non-profit benefit projects. Among the label's more notable acts and events have been the 2009 Lollapalooza opener April Smith, former and founding member of Sony/Epic recording artists For Squirrels and Subrosa, Travis Tooke, and a CD and concert tour to benefit Invisible Children.

== History ==
IPR was launched in 2005 by label President and founder Dave Kosciolek. The label was spun off from the music venue Indigo Coffeehouse (Aberdeen, NJ 2003-2006), which was owned by Kosciolek and his wife Ileana. The venue helped revitalize the original music scene in central NJ by featuring such acts as top Americana group Red Molly, April Smith, and recent Voice semi-finalist Charlotte Sometimes early in their careers.

In 2007, IPR signed its first national artist when Travis Tooke released "Artichoke." In 2009, IPR signed on to work with the non-profit Invisible Children on producing a benefit CD and three city tour, which featured contributions from three Grammy Award nominees (Chris Barron of the Spin Doctors, Aaron Dugan of Matisyahu, and Sophie B. Hawkins).

== Current Artists ==
- Helixglow
- [http://www.anjeliapelay.com/ Anjelia Pelay
- Samantha Lu
- Travis Tooke

== Past Artists/Projects ==
- Invisible Children
- Tina Vero
- April Smith
- Lettuce Olive
- Janey Todd
