= For Squirrels =

American alternative rock band

- For Squirrels. Left to right: Bill White, Jack Vigliatura, Travis Tooke, Jack Griego

Background information
- Also known as: Subrosa, Revlover
- Origin: Gainesville, Florida, U.S.
- Genres: Alternative rock, grunge
- Years active: 1992–2001
- Label: 550 Music
- Past members: Travis Tooke; Jack Vigliatura; Bill White; Jay Russell; Jack Griego; Andy Lord; Mike Amish; Rusty Valentine
- Website: www.forsquirrels.net

For Squirrels was an American alternative rock band based in Gainesville, Florida, United States, founded in 1992.

Their 1995 single "Mighty K.C." became an alternative rock radio hit about three months after a touring van accident that claimed the lives of founding members Jack Vigliatura IV and Bill White, along with tour manager Tim Bender, while the band was on the cusp of national recognition.

The surviving members of the band changed the name to Subrosa in 1996 before disbanding in 2001.

== History ==
=== Classic lineup (1992–1995) ===
The band's original lineup consisted of vocalist Vigliatura, bassist White, guitarist Travis Tooke, and drummer Jay Russell. Explaining their name, the band had said that they were so committed to being in a band, they would play music "for squirrels." The group played jangly alternative rock akin to R.E.M., one of their prime influences, with heavier moments alluding to the sound of grunge rock and Nirvana.

Drummer Jack Griego eventually replaced Russell. In early 1994, they self-released their first full album, Baypath Rd., followed by the Plymouth EP, which simply re-released five songs directly taken from Baypath Rd. Steven E. Goldman, a prominent Miami attorney, served as the band's manager. After touring and establishing a following, the band signed with Sony/550 Music and recorded the album Example with producer Nick Launay (at the time known for working with Midnight Oil, Talking Heads and Kate Bush), which was set to be released on October 3, 1995.

On September 8, 1995, while returning from playing the CMJ Music Marathon in New York City, the band was involved in the auto accident that killed Vigliatura, White, and Bender. Griego and Tooke suffered multiple injuries but survived the crash. The album was released as planned. The single "Mighty K.C.", about the death of Kurt Cobain, was a minor hit and continued to drive album sales.

=== Post-accident (1995-1996) ===
A few months after the accident, Tooke and Griego regrouped with school friend Andy Lord on bass and Tooke taking over on vocals. In February 1996, the new lineup began by playing a few low-key shows centered around classic For Squirrels songs and a selection of covers under the pseudonym Revlover. Eventually, they resurrected the For Squirrels moniker and began writing and performing new material, favoring a heavier grunge sound.

=== As Subrosa (1996–2001) ===
By late 1996, the trio was playing under the name Subrosa. In the summer of 1997, they released their only record under this name, Never Bet the Devil Your Head, on Sony Records, to decent reviews but poor sales. A music video was filmed for the track "Buzzard" from the album. Second guitarist Mike Amish was later added, which was followed by a tour supporting popular alternative rock act Creed. Griego eventually parted ways with the group and was replaced in the band's final years by Rusty Valentine. They disbanded in 2001.

=== Later activity ===
Tooke, Lord and Amish have remained active in the Gainesville rock scene. Tooke has performed under several monikers including his most recent music project, Helixglow. He has also released a solo CD and several singles (2012) via Indigo Planet Records. Amish and Lord now play in the band Papercranes.

== Discography ==
=== Studio albums ===
- Baypath Rd (1994)
- Example (1995)

=== Extended plays ===
- Plymouth (1994)

=== Singles ===
List of singles
Title	Year	Peak chart positions		Album
Title	Year	U.S. Modern Rock	U.S. Hot 100 Airplay	Album
"Mighty K.C."	1995	15	70	Example

== Band members ==
- Jack Vigiliatura (deceased) – vocals (1992–1995)
- Travis Tooke – guitar, vocals (1992–2001)
- Bill White (deceased) – bass (1992–1995)
- Jay Russell – drums (1992–1993)
- Jack Griego – drums (1993–1999)
- Andy Lord – bass (1995–2001)
- Mike Amish – guitar, keyboards (1997–2001)
- Rusty Valentine – drums (1999–2001)

(1992–1993)	Jack Vigliatura – vocals; Travis Tooke – guitar; Bill White – bass; Jay Russell – drums
(1993–Sep. 1995)	Jack Vigliatura – vocals; Travis Tooke – guitar; Bill White – bass; Jack Griego – drums	Baypath Rd (1994); Plymouth EP (1994); Example (1995)
(1995–1997) as Revlover (1996) as For Squirrels (1996) as Subrosa (Dec. 1996–1997)	Travis Tooke – vocals, guitar; Andy Lord – bass; Jack Griego – drums	Never Bet the Devil Your Head (1997)
(April 1997 – 1999) as Subrosa	Travis Tooke – vocals, guitar; Mike Amish – guitar, keyboard; Andy Lord – bass; Jack Griego – drums
(1999–2001) as Subrosa	Travis Tooke – vocals, guitar; Mike Amish – guitar, keyboard; Andy Lord – bass; Rusty Valentine – drums
