= Wirrinyga Band =

- Origin: Milingimbi, Northern Territory, Australia
- Labels: CAAMA Music

Wirrinyga Band (also known as Warrinyga Band) are a rock band from Milingimbi, a small island in Arnhem Land, Northern Territory. The band members are Yolngu. They sing in both Language and English and they mix modern instruments with traditional.

== Discography ==
- Dreamtime Shadow (1990) - CAAMA
- Dreamtime Wisdom, Modern Time Vision (1995) - CAAMA
