= Hyderomastgroningem =

Studio album by Ruins
- Released: 1995
- Recorded: December 1993
- Genre: Progressive rock; zeuhl
- Length: 67:15
- Label: Tzadik
- Producer: Ruins

Ruins chronology
| Graviyaunosch (1993) | Hyderomastgroningem (1995) | Refusal Fossil (1997) |

Professional ratings
Review scores
| Source | Rating |
|---|---|
| AllMusic | 4/5 stars |

Hyderomastgroningem is the fifth studio album by Japanese band Ruins, released in 1995 through Tzadik Records. Rolling Stone ranked the album 49th on their list of the 50 greatest progressive rock albums of all time.

== Track listing ==
All tracks are written by Tatsuya Yoshida.

| No. | Title | Length |
|---|---|---|
| 1. | "Hyderomastgroningem" | 1:27 |
| 2. | "Bríxön Varrömíks" | 9:41 |
| 3. | "0′33″" | 0:33 |
| 4. | "Economic Mond Possa" | 2:02 |
| 5. | "Pig Brag Crack" | 2:23 |
| 6. | "Prrifth" | 5:19 |
| 7. | "Pontemcorary Music #1" | 2:40 |
| 8. | "Zurna Taksím" | 0:37 |
| 9. | "Comme a la Radio" | 0:39 |
| 10. | "Gravestone" | 3:20 |
| 11. | "Memories of Zwõrrisdéh" | 5:27 |
| 12. | "Skyscraper" | 2:19 |
| 13. | "Dölnnén Vlãst" | 2:47 |
| 14. | "Stone Eater" | 4:20 |
| 15. | "Pontemcorary Music #2" | 1:45 |
| 16. | "Dél Fãnci Känt" | 7:36 |
| 17. | "Bonze from Hell" | 0:33 |
| 18. | "Speed Ball" | 2:50 |
| 19. | "Ordinary People in Idaho" | 4:02 |
| 20. | "Blïezzaning Möltz" | 6:52 |

== Personnel ==
- Tatsuya Yoshida – drums, percussion, vocals
- Ryuichi Masuda – bass guitar, vocals
