= Pucker! =

Studio album by The Selecter
- Released: 22 August 1995
- Recorded: 1995
- Genre: Ska; rock
- Length: 35:48
- Label: Dojo Records; Triple X
- Producer: Nick Welsh

The Selecter chronology
The Happy Album (1994)	Pucker! (1995)	Cruel Britannia (1998)

Singles from Pucker!
- 1. "Hairspray" Released: 1995

Pucker! (originally released as Hairspray in the United States) is the fourth album by English 2 Tone ska revival band The Selecter, released in 1995 on Dojo Music in the United Kingdom as, under the name Hairspray, on Triple X Records in the United States. Following the band's reinvented sound on their previous album, The Happy Album (1994), the band recorded Pucker! in 1995 with help from guitarist Paul Seacroft. Establishing a new direction, the album mostly sees the band establishing a "mild-mannered" version of its ska sound while incorporating elements from new wave and power pop, leading to an uncharacteristic "bizarre blend of elements" which stretched the band's horizons. The album's lyrics are also unusually sunny and lightweight.

The album was promoted with the single "Hairspray". Though neither the single nor the album charted, the album received mostly positive reviews, with the album's lively spirit, peppy couplet of cover versions and B.J. Cole's pedal steel guitar appearance, described by one critic as one of the most unusual elements of the album, being highlighted. The band toured in promotion of the album in 1995, leading to the live album Live at Roskilde Festival. Moon Ska Europe remastered and re-released the Hairspray version of the album in the UK in 2005.

== Background and recording ==
After re-forming with a new line-up in 1991, consisting of founding members Pauline Black and Neol Davies alongside drummer Perry Melius and former Bad Manners members Nick Welsh and Martin Stewart, The Selecter underwent a live reunion tour, leading to the acclaimed live album Out in the Streets (1992). After its release, Davies and Melius left the band, and original member Arthur "Gaps" Hendrickson rejoined the band, sharing vocals with Black. The new line-up recorded the band's third studio album, The Happy Album, released in 1994. The album saw a change in direction for the band, taking influence from hip hop music, orchestral music, electronics and "contemporary rhythms," while keeping the band's ska sound at its core.

Although not a commercial success, The Happy Album won the band critical acclaim, and the band began work on its follow-up, Pucker!, in 1995. Unlike on The Happy Album, where he provided co-production, the band's bassist Nick Welsh produced Pucker! alone. In addition to the band's core line-up, the band also asked Paul Seacroft to play guitar on the album as an unofficial fifth member, and he agreed. Although the band were still signed to Triple X Records in the United States, the band signed a new contract with Dojo Records in the UK, and Pucker! was the band's first album for the label.

== Music and lyrics ==
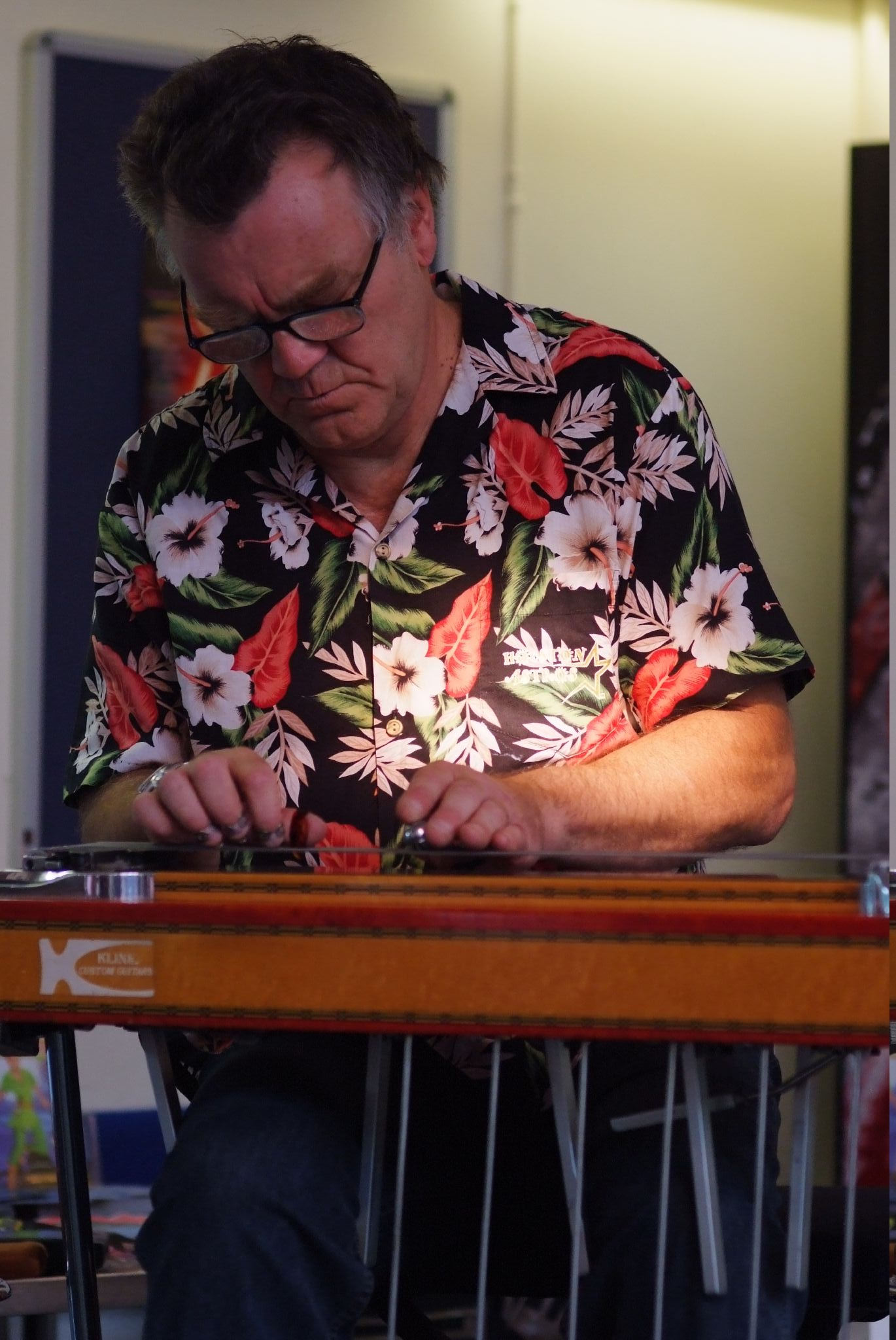
B.J. Cole plays pedal steel guitar on "Sugar Town".

Pucker! marks another stylistic deviation for the band. According to Terry Rompers of Trouser Press, the album is mostly a "mild-mannered version" of the band's ska roots, "clinging to the familiar peppy keyboard, bass, guitar and snare syncopation of ska," but also adding giddy elements from new wave music and power pop. The sound of the album has been compared to "the Yachts, perhaps, or the Go-Go's" discovering "some old Skatalites records." Rompers described the album as containing a "harmlessly bizarre blend of elements" that helped distance the album from its predecessor, while Martin C. Strong saw the album as an attempt to broaden the band's horizons. In his overall review of the band's discography, Rompers said of the new direction taken by the band on Pucker!:

"The same mob [that made The Happy Album] made [Pucker!], but you'd never know it from the catchy chorus of 'My Perfect World,' which leads it off, or the cornball pot-centric version of Bob Dylan's 'Rainy Day Women#12 & 35' that curls up near the end."

Also unlike the band's previous albums, which featured political and bitter lyrics, the lyrics on Pucker! are sunny and lightweight, with the exception of "Then She Did", which has been described as a "misery epic." The original songs on the album were written by Black and Welsh, although, similarly to The Happy Album, the album also contains two cover versions, namely "Sugar Town", originally written by Lee Hazlewood and performed by Nancy Sinatra, and Bob Dylan's 1966 single "Rainy Day Women #12 & #35". B. J. Cole appears as a guest musician on the band's cover of "Sugar Town", playing the pedal steel guitar. Rompers described his appearance on the song as one of the album's most unusual elements. Original song "Chocolate Whip" shows the album's "occasionally silly side," while the band's cover version of "Rainy Day Women #12 & #35" has been described as a "cornball pot-centric version."

== Release and reception ==
Professional ratings
Review scores
Source	Rating
The Encyclopedia of Popular Music	3/5 stars
Martin C. Strong	4/10
Trouser Press	(favourable)

Pucker! was released in the United Kingdom by Dojo Records on 22 August 1995. However, in the United States, the album was renamed Hairspray and given alternative album artwork. The Hairspray edition was released by Triple X Records in the United States on 12 September 1995. Dojo Music released the song "Hairspray" as a single in 1995 to promote the album, using the same cover artwork as the Hairspray version of the album. The single featured the songs "Hairspray" and "Die Happy" from the album as well as live versions of "Missing Words" and "On My Radio" recorded in Minneapolis in 1991.

The album received both positive and mixed reviews from music critics. Terry Rompers of Trouser Press was favourable towards the album, saying that, although the album is a "surprising step backward," the album's "harmlessly bizarre blend of elements [...] is surprisingly delightful." More mixed in his assessment was Martin C. Strong in The Great Rock Discography, where he rated the album four out of ten and said that The Selecter "were trying too hard to convince the public they could expand their horizons" with the album. He also felt the album "was hardly going to prise the ska crown" from third wave ska bands like Mighty Mighty Bosstones and No Doubt. Slightly more favourable, however, was Colin Larkin, who rated the album three stars out of five in his book The Encyclopedia of Popular Music.

Being a low-key release, similar to the band's other albums of the 1990s and 2000s, neither the album, nor its single, entered the UK Albums Chart. The band toured in promotion of the album, leading to the live album Live at Roskilde Festival, which was recorded at Denmark's Roskilde Festival on 1 July 1995 and released in 1996 on Magnum Music. On 17 January 2005, record label Moon Ska Europe remastered and re-released the Hairspray version of the album in the United Kingdom for the first time, adding a music video of the song "On My Radio" as bonus CD-ROM content.

== Track listing ==
Except where otherwise noted, all tracks composed by Pauline Black and Nick Welsh

1. "My Perfect World" – 3:36
2. "Hearsay" – 3:13
3. "Die Happy" – 3:38
4. "Sugar Town" (Lee Hazlewood) – 3:15
5. "Hair Spray" – 2:34
6. "Chocolate Whip" – 2:49
7. "Not So Tall" – 3:48
8. "Then She Did" – 3:59
9. "Rainy Day Women" (Bob Dylan) – 4:13
10. "Vicky's Magic Garden" – 4:43

== Personnel ==
The Selecter

- Pauline Black - vocals
- Arthur "Gaps" Hendrickson - vocals
- Nick Welsh - bass, producer, mixing
- Martin Stewart - keyboards

with:

- Paul Seacroft - guitar
- B.J. Cole - pedal steel
