= Respect (Alliance Ethnik song) =

- Artwork by Number 6

Single by Alliance Ethnik

from the album Simple et Funky
- B-side: "Instrumental, Remix"
- Released: 10 January 1995
- Genre: R&B; funk
- Length: 4:21
- Label: Virgin; Delabel
- Songwriters: M. Darmon; F. Henri; Kamel Houairi; Vinia Mojica; Nicolas Vadon
- Producer: Bob Power

Alliance Ethnik singles chronology
"Respect" (1995)	"Simple & Funky" (1996)

Audio sample
- Alliance Ethnik - "Respect": file; help

"Respect" is a 1995 song recorded by French hip hop act Alliance Ethnik. It was the first single from his album Respect, and was released in January 1995. It achieved success in several countries, including France and Belgium where it was a top three hit. The song was Alliance Ethnik's biggest hit to date and can be deemed as its signature song.

== Structure ==
After a 30-second introduction using the sound of a radio, the song contains several samples from songs such as "It's Good to Be the King Rap Pt 1" by Mel Brooks, "Back Together Again" by Roberta Flack and Donny Hathaway and a small interpolation of "Life's a Bitch" of American rapper Nas. The verses, performed by K-mel, are in French, while other verses and the refrains are sung by Vinia Mojica in English. The male singer has a delivery "which makes use of words and onomatopoeia with mischievouness [sic] and joviality". This single is "festive and optimistic", and uses the repertoire of the 1980s rap. The music video was shot in black and white.

== Chart performances ==
"Respect" had a success on the French SNEP Singles Chart (top 50), where it ranked for 33 weeks; it debuted at number 13 on 28 January 1995, then entered in the top ten where it remained for 22 weeks, with a peak at number two for four consecutive weeks, behind The Cranberries' hit "Zombie". It achieved Gold status awarded by the Syndicat National de l'Édition Phonographique. In Belgium (Wallonia), it was number one for a sole week, and remained for 17 weeks in the top ten and 24 weeks in the top 40. In Belgium (Flanders), Sweden and Austria, "Respect" achieved a moderate success where it was a top-25 hit. In Germany, it achieved only a low charts positions.

== Track listings ==
- CD single
1. "Respect" (radio edit) — 4:21
2. "Respect" (instrumental) — 4:21
- CD maxi
1. "Respect" (radio edit) — 4:18
2. "Respect" (Prince Paul's bag of tricks remix) — 4:21
3. "Respect" (Prince Paul's project mix) — 4:30
4. "Respect" (Prince Paul's bag of tricks instrumental) — 4:50
- 12" maxi
1. "Respect" (radio edit) — 4:18
2. "Respect" (Prince Paul's bag of tricks remix) — 4:21
3. "Respect" (Prince Paul's project mix) — 4:30
4. "Respect" (Prince Paul's bag of tricks instrumental) — 4:50
- 12" maxi - Promo
1. "Respect" (Prince Paul's bag of tricks remix) — 4:21
2. "Respect" (Prince Paul's project mix) — 4:30
3. "Respect" (Prince Paul's bag of tricks instrumental) — 4:50

== Credits ==
- Produced and mixed by Bob Power
- Vocals by Vinia Mojica
- Remixes by Prince Paul

== Charts and certifications ==
=== Weekly charts ===
Chart (1995)	Peak position
Austria (Ö3 Austria Top 40)	25
Belgium (Ultratop Flanders)	25
Belgium (Ultratop Wallonia)	1
Europe (Eurochart Hot 100)	18
Europe (European Hit Radio)	34
France (SNEP)	2
Germany (GfK)	72
Quebec (ADISQ)	14
Sweden (Sverigetopplistan)	30

=== Year-end charts ===
Chart (1995)	Position
Belgium (Ultratop Wallonia)	4
Europe (Eurochart Hot 100)	52
France (SNEP)	5

=== Certifications ===
Country	Certification	Date	Sales certified
France	Gold	21 December 1995	250,000
