= Double Vision (band) =

Spanish band

- Origin: Spain
- Genres: Eurodance, Techno
- Years active: 1993-1999
- Past members: Carol McCloskey; DJ Pedro Cervero

Double Vision was a Spanish Euro Dance duo, consisting of Carol McCloskey and DJ Pedro Cervero. They were successful mostly in Germany, Austria, Belgium, Netherlands, and Switzerland with their songs with catchy lyrics with techno beats.

After initial success in Spain, Double Vision's single "Knockin'" released in 1995 enjoyed big popularity in Germany reaching Top 5 in German, Dutch and Belgian Singles Chart and a Top 10 hit in the Swiss charts in addition to topping the Austrian Singles Chart for 7 consecutive weeks. The follow-up single "All Right" charted in Germany and Austria.

== Discography ==
=== Albums ===
Year	Album	Peak chart positions
Year	Album	AUT
1997	Unsafe Building	44

=== Singles ===
Year	Album	Peak chart positions				
Year	Album	AUT	BEL	GER	NED	SWI
1995	"Knockin' "	1	1	5	2	7
1995	"All Right"	4	2	36	12	—
1996	"Alone Again Or..."	25	48	—	—	—

Others

- 1993: "Sara"
- 1993: "Honey Be Good"
- 1993: "Unsafe Building"
- 1998: "Money"
- 1998: "Knockin' (Rmx 2000)"
- 1999: "Love Me Now"
- 2012: "Knockin' 2012" (Online)
