= Simple & Funky =

1995 single by Alliance Ethnik

Single by Alliance Ethnik

from the album Simple & Funky
- B-side: "Simple & Funky (Prince Paul remix)"
- Released: 1995
- Recorded: 1995
- Genre: Rap, funk, hip hop
- Length: 3:41
- Label: Delabel
- Songwriters: George Clinton, Kamel Houairi, Nicolas Vadon, Mickael Darmon, Fabrice Henri
- Producer: Bob Power

Alliance Ethnik singles chronology
"Respect" (1995)	"Simple & Funky" (1995)	"Honesty & jalousie" (1995)

"Simple & Funky" is a 1995 song recorded by French rap band Alliance Ethnik. Written by George Clinton, Kamel Houairi, Nicolas Vadon, Mickael Darmon and Fabrice Henri, and produced by Bob Power, it was released in June 1995 as the second single from the album Simple & Funky, on which it appears as the 13th track. It was very successful in France and Belgium (Wallonia), becoming Alliance Ethnik's second top three in both countries.

In France, "Simple & Funky" debuted at number 9 on the chart edition of 24 June 1995, then reached a peak of number three two weeks later, remaining for a sole week at this position. It totalled ten weeks in the top five and fell off the top 50 after 20 weeks of presence. It achieved Gold status, awarded by the Syndicat National de l'Édition Phonographique, the French certificator, for over 200,000 units sold. It achieved a similar success in Belgium (Wallonia) where it entered the top 40 at number 19 on 27 July 1995, climbed to number 6 the next week and reached number two in its seventh week. It remained in the top five for ten weeks and in the top 40 for 23 weeks. "Simple & Funky" also charted for 17 weeks on the European Hot 100 with a peak at number 23.

== Track listings ==
CD single

1. "Simple & Funky" (album version) — 3:44
2. "Simple & Funky" (Prince Paul remix) — 4:15

CD maxi

1. "Simple & Funky" (album version) — 3:44
2. "Simple & Funky" (Prince Paul remix) — 4:15
3. "Simple & Funky" (Alliance Ethnik version) — 3:29
4. "Pas la Peine de Smoke" (interlude) — 2:04
5. "Simple & Funky" (Prince Paul instrumental) — 4:14
6. "Simple & Funky" (Alliance Ethnik a cappella remix) — 3:22

12" maxi

1. "Simple & Funky" (album version) — 3:44
2. "Simple & Funky" (Prince Paul remix) — 4:12
3. "Simple & Funky" (Prince Paul Instrumental) — 4:14
4. "Simple & Funky" (Alliance Ethnik version) — 3:29
5. "Pas la Peine de Smoke" (interlude) — 2:04
6. "Simple & Funky" (Alliance Ethnik a cappella remix) — 3:22

== Charts ==
=== Weekly charts ===
Chart (1995)	Peak position
Belgium (Ultratop 50 Wallonia)	2
Europe (European Hot 100 Singles)	23
France (SNEP)	3
Quebec (ADISQ)	16

=== Year-end charts ===
Chart (1995)	Position
Belgium (Ultratop 50 Wallonia)	13
Belgium (Ultratop 50 Wallonia - Francophone chart)	4
Europe (European Hot 100 Singles)	93
France (SNEP)	12

== Certifications ==
Certifications for "Simple & Funky"
Region	Certification	Certified units/sales
France (SNEP)	Gold	250,000^{*}
^{*} Sales figures based on certification alone.

== Release history ==
Country	Date	Format	Label
France, Belgium	1995	Delabel	CD single
France, Belgium	1995	Delabel	CD maxi
France, Belgium	1995	Delabel	12" maxi
