= Alliance Ethnik =

French hip hop band

- Origin: Île-de-France, France
- Genres: Hip hop
- Years active: 1990s
- Label: Virgin
- Members: K-Mel; Médard; Gutsy; Crazy B Faster Jay

Alliance Ethnik was a 1990s French hip hop band. It was composed of five members from different origins, but all spoke French or were of French origin: Algeria, DR Congo, Italy, and France.

== History ==
K-Mel, the front man of Alliance Ethnik, performed for the first time in his home town of Creil, France. He formed the group with friends Médard and Gutsy, which expanded to include the DJs Crazy B and Faster J soon after this debut. The members recorded a demo tape which was heard by IZB, a group of rap promoters, who put them in a Paris concert with the Marseille rap group IAM in 1992.

The group began recording in 1994, with an appearance on the compilation album Mondial Rap but its first album was Simple & Funky, released in 1995. It included the singles "Simple & Funky", "Respect" and "Honesty & Jalousie".

== Discography ==
=== Albums ===
Year	Title	Chart			Certification (FR)
Year	Title	FR	BEL (WA)	SWI	Certification (FR)
1995	Simple et Funky	9	5	19	Platinum
1999	Fat Come Back	25	—	37	—

The second album includes guest appearances by De La Soul, Common, Vinia Mojica, Youssou N'Dour and Biz Markie

=== Compilations ===
- Best of Alliance Ethnik (2002) Including guest appearances by De La Soul, Common, Cheb Mami, Vinia Mojica, and Biz Markie

=== Singles ===
Year	Title	Chart						Certification (FR)
Year	Title	FR	BEL (WA)	BEL (FL)	AUS	SWE	GER	Certification (FR)
1995	"Respect"	2	1	25	25	30	72	Gold
1995	"Simple & Funky"	3	2	—	—	—	—	Gold
1995	"Honesty et jalousie"	5	3	—	—	—	—	Silver
1999	"5 Heures du mat"	63	—	—	—	—	—	—
1999	"No Limites"	25	32	—	—	—	—	—
