= Radio Songs =

Radio Songs, Radio Song and The Radio Song may refer to:

- Radio Songs (chart), chart released weekly by Billboard magazine
- "Radio Song", fourth single released by R.E.M. from their 1991 album Out of Time
- Radio Songs (album), an album of duo Robin and Linda Williams
- Radio Songs: A Best of Cold Chisel (1985), second greatest hits collection by Australian pub rock band Cold Chisel
- "The Radio Song" (New Found Glory song), demo on the album New Found Glory by the American rock band of the same name
- "The Radio Song" (Joe Walsh song), by the guitarist for the Eagles
- "Radio Song" (Jet song), from Jet's album Get Born
- "Radio Song", a song by the Cat Empire from their 2007 album So Many Nights
- "Radio Song", a song by Hardy featuring Jeremy McKinnon from Hardy's album The Mockingbird & the Crow
- "The Radio Song", a song by Dillard & Clark from their 1968 album The Fantastic Expedition of Dillard & Clark

== See also ==
- ABU Radio Song Festival, a biennial song festival organised by the Asia-Pacific Broadcasting Union (ABU)
