= Almost Acoustic (Volume 1) =

Compilation album by Blessid Union of Souls
- Released: October 30, 2007
- Recorded: 2007
- Genre: Alternative rock
- Label: Alert Entertainment
- Producer: Mark Liggett

Blessid Union of Souls chronology
Perception (2005)	Almost Acoustic (Volume 1) (2007)	Close to the Edge (2008)

Almost Acoustic (Volume 1) is a compilation album by the American alternative rock band Blessid Union of Souls, released on October 30, 2007. The album features acoustic versions of some of the band's biggest hits, along with short descriptions by vocalist Eliot Sloan on how each song came to be.

Previously a iTunes-only exclusive, Almost Acoustic (Volume 1) is available on most major streaming platforms.

== Track listing ==
All tracks are written by Blessid Union of Souls, except "Everything I Own", written by David Gates of Bread.

No.	Title	Length
1.	"Lucky to Be Here (Story)"	0:18
2.	"Lucky to Be Here"	3:41
3.	"I Believe (Story)"	0:28
4.	"I Believe"	4:14
5.	"Let Me Be the One (Story)"	0:48
6.	"Let Me Be the One"	4:48
7.	"Everything I Own (Story)"	0:46
8.	"Everything I Own"	3:06
9.	"Peace & Love (Story)"	0:36
10.	"Peace & Love"	4:36
11.	"Hey Leonardo (She Likes Me for Me) (Story)"	0:57
12.	"Hey Leonardo (She Likes Me for Me)"	3:33
