= Shelly Peiken =

American songwriter

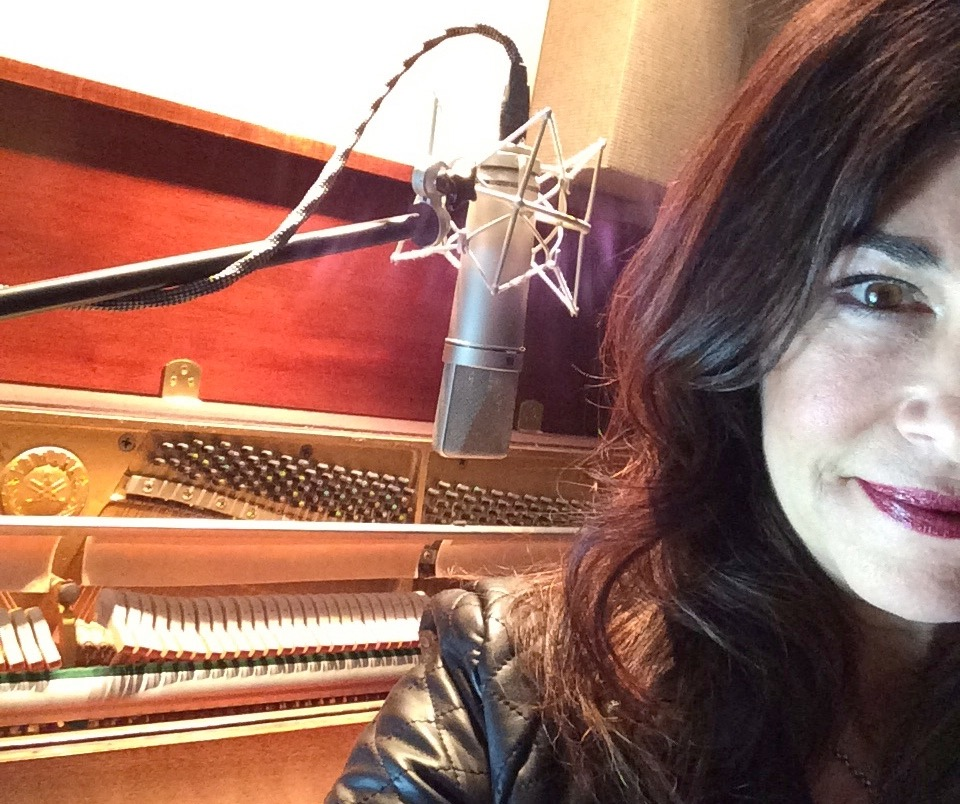

Background information
- Genres: Pop; rock
- Occupations: Songwriter; author
- Instruments: Piano; guitar; vocals
- Years active: 1986–present
- Website: www.shellypeiken.com

Shelly Meg Peiken is an American songwriter who is best known for co-writing the US No. 1 hits "What a Girl Wants" and "Come On Over Baby" by Christina Aguilera the US No. 2 hit "Bitch" by Meredith Brooks, "Almost Doesn't Count" by Brandy, and "Who You Are" by Jessie J. She has also written for or with artists and groups such as Britney Spears, The Pretenders, Natasha Bedingfield, Keith Urban, Celine Dion, Reba McEntire, Cher, Jessie J, Miley Cyrus, Ed Sheeran, Aaliyah, Lindsay Lohan, Ashley Tisdale, Selena Gomez, Idina Menzel and Demi Lovato and has had hundreds of songs licensed for TV and film.

== Biography ==
Shelly Peiken grew up in Freeport, Long Island where she became interested in music at an early age. Later, she attended the University of Maryland where she studied fashion design, only to come to New York City afterwards where she spent many years developing her true passion as a singer-songwriter.

She signed her first publishing deal with boutique company, Hit & Run Music, and went on to write songs for Brandy, Natalie Cole, Celine Dion, The Pretenders, Britney Spears, Jessie J, Demi Lovato, Selena Gomez, INXS, Backstreet Boys, Keith Urban and many others.

In 1998, Peiken and Meredith Brooks earned a Best Rock Song Grammy nomination for "Bitch".

Further success followed with two No. 1's for Christina Aguilera, "What a Girl Wants" and "Come On Over Baby," "I Wanna Be With You" for Mandy Moore, "Hook Me Up" (a No. 1 in Australia, written with Greg Wells and The Veronicas), "Who You Are" (written with Toby Gad and Jessie J), "Human on the Inside" for the Pretenders (written with Mark McEntee), and "Almost Doesn't Count" for Brandy (written with Guy Roche).

She has blogged for sites such as Huffington Post, and Yamaha Music where she writes of her experiences as a songwriter, creativity, the challenges of the current music business, and the balancing of career and parenthood. She has a personal website and blog as well.

Peiken's first book, Confessions of a Serial Songwriter, was published by Backbeat Books, on March 1, 2016, and was nominated for Best Spoken Word Album at the 60th Annual Grammy Awards.

She resides in Los Angeles with husband, film composer Adam Gorgoni and her daughter, Layla.

== Artist recordings ==
In 2020, Peiken began releasing singles from her debut album 2.0, etc…. Peiken called the album "a celebration of songwriting... I included songs from my career that either catapulted me in a commercial way but also songs I was very connected to and were never released commercially before. If I don't put them out there, nobody is ever going to hear them." The album includes previously unreleased songs "Just Wanna Be Your Girl," "George & John," and "Notebook," as well as her own recording of "What A Girl Wants" in celebration of its 20th anniversary as the first number 1 song of the century.

== Discography ==
=== Complete discography ===
Year	Title	Artist	Album
1988	"Love Takes Over"	Tommy Page	Tommy Page
1988	"Ready for This Love"	Samantha Fox	I Wanna Have Some Fun
1988	"Carry Your Heart"	Taylor Dayne	Tell It to My Heart
1989	"Up All Night"	Taylor Dayne	Can't Fight Fate
1989	"I Can't Cry"	Natalie Cole	Good to Be Back
1990	"He'll Never Know"	Sweet Sensation	Love Child
1991	"Guess It Wasn't Mine"	Curtis Stigers	Curtis Stigers
1991	"You're All That Matters To Me"	Curtis Stigers	Curtis Stigers
1992	"If I Were You"	Celine Dion	Celine Dion
1992	"I Think I'm In Trouble"	Exposé	Exposé
1993	"Take A Piece of My Heart"	Lulu	I'm Back for More
1994	"Take A Piece of My Heart"	Jennifer Brown	Giving You The Best
1995	"Romeo's Twin"	Niamh Kavanagh	Flying Bird
1996	"Have Mercy"	Viktor Lazlo	Back To Front
1996	"Human on the Inside"	Divinyls	Underworld
1997	"Bitch"	Meredith Brooks	Blurring the Edges
1997	"Shatter"	Meredith Brooks	Blurring the Edges
1997	"I Need"	Meredith Brooks	Blurring the Edges
1997	"Birthday"	Meredith Brooks	Blurring the Edges
1997	"Wash my Hands"	Meredith Brooks	Blurring the Edges
1997	"Stuck On You"	Victoria Shaw	Victoria Shaw
1997	"Peace and Love"	Blessid Union of Souls	Blessid Union of Souls
1998	"Almost Doesn't Count"	Brandy	Never Say Never
1998	"When I Remember When"	Five	Five
1998	"Hey Now Now"	Swirl 360	Ask Anybody
1998	"Even If It Breaks My Heart"	Cliff Richard	Real as I Wanna Be
1998	"Woman and a Man"	Cliff Richard	Real as I Wanna Be
1998	"Under My Tree"	NSYNC	Home for Christmas
1998	"Guess It's Christmas Time"	NSYNC	Home for Christmas
1998	"It's Not Goodbye"	Laura Pausini	La mia risposta
1999	"These Days"	Brian Kennedy & Ronan Keating	Now That I Know What I Want
1999	"What a Girl Wants"	Christina Aguilera	Christina Aguilera
1999	"Come On Over Baby"	Christina Aguilera	Christina Aguilera
1999	"Don't Make Me Love You"	Christina Aguilera	Christina Aguilera
1999	"Too Beautiful For Words"	Christina Aguilera	What a Girl Wants - B-side
1999	"Everytime You Cry"	John Farnham & Human Nature	Live at the Regent Theatre - 1st July 1999
1999	"Turn The Page"	Aaliyah	Music of the Heart - Soundtrack
1999	"Bored with Myself"	Meredith Brooks	Deconstruction
1999	"Human"	The Pretenders	Viva el Amor
1999	"I'm Not Your Girl"	Reba McEntire	So Good Together
2000
2000	"Last Night"	Gloria Gaynor	Last Night - Single
2000	"That's What Love Will Do"	i5	i5
2000	"First Kiss"	i5	i5
2000	"Rain Rain"	Innosense	So Together
2000	"So Together"	Innosense	So Together
2000	"Don't Mess With My Love"	M2M	Shades of Purple
2000	"I Wanna Be With You"	Mandy Moore	Center Stage - Soundtrack
2000	"Almost Doesn't Count"	Mark Wills	Permanently
2001
2001	"Better Love Next Time"	Gladys Knight	So Together
2001	"That's Why They Call It Love"	Gladys Knight	So Together
2001	"As Long As You're Loving Me"	Vitamin C	More
2001	"Rain Rain"	Cher	Living Proof
2001	"When I Get There"	Dream	It Was All a Dream
2001	"While You Were Gone"	Jennifer Paige	Positively Somewhere
2001	"17"	Mandy Moore	Mandy Moore
2001	"You Get Me"	Michelle Branch	The Spirit Room
2001	"Por Qué?"	Myra	Milagros
2001	"As If"	Myra	Myra
2002
2002	"Sleep Tonight"	Jacob Young	S-Curve
2002	"As If"	Blaque	Blaque Out
2002	"Super Love"	Celine Dion	A New Day Has Come
2002	"Stand In Your Way"	Jennifer Love Hewitt	BareNaked
2002	"It's Only Love"	Joe Cocker	Respect Yourself
2002	"Leave A Light on"	Joe Cocker	Respect Yourself
2002	"This Is Your Life"	Joe Cocker	Respect Yourself
2002	"Trouble With Goodbye"	LeAnn Rimes	Twisted Angel
2002	"Shine"	Meredith Brooks	Shine
2002	"Shut Up and Kiss Me or Just Shut Up"	Michelle Wright	Shut Up and Kiss Me
2002	"First Kiss"	Nina	Heaven
2002	"Jealous"	Nina	Heaven
2002	"Whenever I Run"	Keith Urban	Golden Road
2003
2003	"Forget Me Not"	Celine Dion	One Heart
2003	"Done"	Lucy Woodward	While You Can
2003	"Is This Hollywood"	Lucy Woodward	While You Can
2003	"The Trouble With Me"	Lucy Woodward	While You Can
2003	"Decadent Wish"	Meat Loaf	"Testify" single
2004
2004	"Sweetest Pain"	Haylie Duff	Raising Helen - Soundtrack
2004	"Coulda Been"	Kimberley Locke	One Love
2004	"Something I Never Had"	Lindsay Lohan	Speak
2004	"Fools Like Me"	Lisa Loeb	The Way It Really Is
2004	"What's Real"	Raven-Symoné	This Is My Time
2005
2005	"Better To Be Lonely"	Tammin	Whatever Will Be
2005	"Perfect Strangers"	INXS	Switch
2005	"Bad Habit"	Sarah Hudson	Naked Truth
2005	"Unlove You"	Sarah Hudson	Naked Truth
2005	"Lose It All"	Backstreet Boys	Never Gone
2006
2006	"I'm Better"	Ashley Parker Angel	Soundtrack to Your Life
2006	"Dream in Color"	Bianca Ryan	Bianca Ryan
2007
2007	"Map To My Heart"	Celine Dion	Taking Chances
2007	"Clear"	Miley Cyrus	Hannah Montana 2 / Meet Miley Cyrus
2007	"As I Am"	Miley Cyrus	Hannah Montana 2 / Meet Miley Cyrus
2007	"We'll Be Together"	Ashley Tisdale	Headstrong
2007	"Unlove You"	Ashley Tisdale	Headstrong
2007	"Positivity"	Ashley Tisdale	Headstrong
2007	"Love Me For Me"	Ashley Tisdale	Headstrong
2007	"Girl Like Me"	Skye Sweetnam	Sound Soldier
2007	"Hook Me Up"	The Veronicas	Hook Me Up
2008
2008	"Aquí Estoy (You're Not Alone)"	Kudai	Nadha
2008	"Out From Under"	Britney Spears	Circus
2008	"One Love"	Jordan Pruitt	Permission to Fly
2008	"You Belong"	Hercules and Love Affair	Hercules and Love Affair
2009
2009	"Masquerade"	Ashley Tisdale	Guilty Pleasure
2009	"The Way I Loved You"	Selena Gomez and the Scene	Kiss & Tell
2009	"Pieces"	Allison Iraheta	Just Like You
2009	"Trouble Is"	Allison Iraheta	Just Like You
2010
2010	"Freeze"	Mêlée	The Masquerade
2010	"Spotlight"	Selena Gomez and the Scene	A Year Without Rain
2010	"Ghost Of You"	Selena Gomez and the Scene	A Year Without Rain
2010	"Elevator"	David Archuleta	The Other Side of Down
2010	"Who I Am"	David Archuleta	The Other Side of Down
2010	"Good Place"	David Archuleta	The Other Side of Down
2011
2011	"Pretending"	Glee Cast	Glee: The Music, Volume 6
2011	"Extraordinary Merry Christmas"	Glee Cast	Glee: The Music, The Christmas Album Volume 2
2011	"A Christmas Eve With You"	Glee Cast	Glee: The Music, The Christmas Album Volume 2
2011	"Who You Are"	Jessie J	Who You Are
2011	"Louder"	Charice	Louder/Lost The Best Thing
2011	"Mistake"	Demi Lovato	Unbroken
2011	"Aftershock"	Demi Lovato	Unbroken
2011	"Echo"	Javier Colon	Come Through For You
2012
2012	"As A Blonde"	Fefe Dobson	Sunday Love
2012	"Yeah, Yeah, Yeah"	Fefe Dobson	Sunday Love
2012	"Perfect Planet"	Smash Mouth	Magic
2012	"Out Of Love"	Smash Mouth	Magic
2012	"Better With Time"	Smash Mouth	Magic
2012	"Future X-Wife"	Smash Mouth	Magic
2012	"Justin Bieber"	Smash Mouth	Magic
2012	"The Game"	Smash Mouth	Magic
2012	"Take It Hard"	J. Dash	Tabloid Truth
2012	"Shake Santa Shake"	Zendaya	Disney Channel Holiday Playlist
2012	"Had Me @ Hello"	Olivia Holt	Make Your Mark Playlist
2012	"Had Me @ Hello"	Luke Benward	Make Your Mark Playlist
2012	"Like Me Or Not"	Ryan Beatty	Because of You EP
2012	"Lemonade"	Rachel Crow	Rachel Crow
2013
2013	"All or Nothing"	Glee Cast	All or Nothing (Glee Cast Version)
2013	"Outcast"	Glee Cast	Outcast (Glee Cast Version)
2013	"Who I Am"	Ross Lynch	Austin & Ally: Turn It Up
2014
2014	"Dancin' By Myself"	China McClain	Disney Channel Play It Loud
2014	"Lifeline"	Anastacia	Resurrection
2015
2015	"House On Fire"	Ryan Cabrera	Wake Up Beautiful
2015	"Rotten To The Core"	Descendants	Descendants
2015	"Evil"	Dove Cameron	Wicked World
2016
2016	"If I Knew"	Anouk	Queen For A Day
2016	"Handwritten"	Martina Stoessel	Tini
2016	"Cake"	Idina Menzel	idina.
2017	"The Only High"	The Veronicas	The Only High - Single
2018	"I'm A Mess"	Bebe Rexha	Expectations
2019	"Watergirl"	Cashmere Cat	Princess Catgirl
2020
2020	"Just Wanna Be Your Girl"	Shelly Peiken	2.0 etc...
2020	"What A Girl Wants"	Shelly Peiken	2.0 etc...
2020	"George & John"	Shelly Peiken	2.0 etc...
2020	"Notebook"	Shelly Peiken	2.0 etc...
2021	"Stronger Than a Man"	Bonnie Tyler	The Best Is Yet to Come
2024	"What a Girl Wants"	Xtina & Sabrina Carpenter	Spotify Anniversaries LIVE
2026	"Bitch"	Lizzo	BITCH
2026	"Almost"	Victoria Monet	Frequency of Love
