= Blessid Union of Souls: The Singles =

Greatest hits album by Blessid Union of Souls
- Released: February 27, 2001
- Recorded: 1994–2000
- Genre: Alternative rock Pop rock

Blessid Union of Souls chronology
| Walking Off the Buzz (1999) | Blessid Union of Souls: The Singles (2001) | Perception (2005) |

Singles from The Singles
- 1. "Storybook Life" Released: 2001

Professional ratings
Review scores
| Source | Rating |
|---|---|
| AllMusic | link |
| Robert Christgau | link |

Blessid Union of Souls: The Singles is Blessid Union of Souls' greatest hits album. It was released in 2001. The compilation contains two original songs - "...And Then She Hit Me" and "Storybook Life". "Hey, Leonardo" comes from a 1999 live recording at KQKQ Omaha's "Sweetstock" festival, while "I Believe" is performed in a reggae-punk style.

== Track listing ==
1. "Hey Leonardo (She Likes Me for Me)" — 3:27
2. "...And Then She Hit Me" — 3:58
3. "Storybook Life" — 2:52
4. "That's the Girl I've Been Telling You About" — 3:39
5. "I Believe" (Punky Irie Mix) — 2:57
6. "Standing at the Edge of the Earth" — 4:18
7. "Brother My Brother" — 3:44
8. "Light in Your Eyes" — 4:16
9. "Let Me Be the One" — 4:38
10. "Oh Virginia" — 3:59
11. "I Wanna Be There" — 4:30
12. "All Along" — 3:54
13. "Hey Leonardo (She Likes Me for Me)" (live version) — 3:58
14. "I Believe" — 4:27
15. "Rev It Up (NASCAR Rocks)" — 2:55

The CD was also released in Indonesia under the title Storybook Life.
