= Deconstruction (Meredith Brooks album) =

Studio album by Meredith Brooks
- Released: September 28, 1999
- Recorded: c. 1998–1999
- Genre: Alternative rock
- Length: 50:14
- Label: Capitol
- Producer: David Darling; Meredith Brooks; Paul Fox

Meredith Brooks chronology
See It through My Eyes (1997)	Deconstruction (1999)	Bad Bad One (2002)

Singles from Deconstruction
- 1. "Lay Down (Candles in the Rain)" Released: August 24, 1999; 2. "Shout" Released: Q1 2000

Deconstruction is the third studio album by American singer-songwriter Meredith Brooks. It was released on September 28, 1999, by Capitol Records. Following the album's disappointing commercial reception, Brooks was dropped from the record label.

== Recording ==
Unlike her involvement with Meredith Brooks (1986) and Blurring the Edges (1997), Brooks sought to take more control over the compositions on Deconstruction. With the exception of "Lay Down (Candles in the Rain)", Brooks wrote or co-wrote and played lead guitar on every song on the album, in addition to co-producing the album with David Darling. Thematically, Brooks claims that the material on Deconstruction was a direct reaction to her experiences with the success of "Bitch". She explained: "The new album is about deconstructing everything, letting people know that I'm not just any one thing."

== Release and promotion ==
Deconstruction was released on September 28, 1999. Prior to the album's release, Brooks released rough mixes of several album tracks on her official website. There are two unreleased songs from these sessions titled Deconstruction and Strangely Erotic. Fans had the opportunity to vote for their favorite songs and discuss the then-upcoming album with Brooks on the site's message board.

In an effort to promote the album, Brooks opened for the Eurythmics on their Peace Tour (1999).

Two singles were released from the album. The first was a cover version of Melanie's "Lay Down (Candles In The Rain)", which also featured Queen Latifah.

The second single, "Shout," was written by Brooks, and included references to pop culture events at the time, such as the scandal between Bill Clinton and Monica Lewinsky, as well as the Y2K scare. It was featured on the February 2000 in-store playlist at Abercrombie & Fitch.

== Critical reception ==
Professional ratings
Review scores
Source	Rating
AllMusic	3/5 stars
Entertainment Weekly	C+
Los Angeles Times	2/4 stars

Tom Demalon of AllMusic referred to the album as "another pleasant if somewhat derivative helping of adult rock [from Brooks]." Demalon highlighted "Nobody's Home" and "I Said" as the standout tracks from the album. Beth Johnson of Entertainment Weekly remarked that the album starts off strong with "Shout," before delving into "sound-alikes of Sheryl Crow, late-'90s Madonna, and (oh so annoyingly) Blondie's rap."

== Commercial performance ==
In the United States, Deconstruction was considered a commercial disappointment in comparison to Brooks' previous effort, Blurring the Edges. Deconstruction failed to chart on the Billboard 200 chart and the album only sold approximately 20,000 units over two months after release.

== Track listing ==
Deconstruction – Standard edition
No.	Title	Writer(s)	Length
1.	"Shout"	Brooks	3:54
2.	"Lay Down (Candles in the Rain)" (featuring Queen Latifah)	Melanie Safka; Queen Latifah	4:37
3.	"I Have Everything"	Brooks	4:05
4.	"Cosmic Woo Woo"	Brooks; Larry Dvoskin	3:36
5.	"Nobody's Home"	Brooks; Shelly Peiken	5:12
6.	"All for Nothing"	Brooks; Rick Nowels	4:43
7.	"I Said It"	Brooks; Nowels	3:23
8.	"Back to Eden"	Brooks; Nowels	3:52
9.	"Bored with Myself"	Brooks; Peiken	3:45
10.	"Careful What You Wish For"	Brooks; Peiken; Adam Gorgoni	4:27
11.	"Sin City"	Brooks	4:37
12.	"Back to Nowhere"	Brooks	4:03
Total length:			50:14

Deconstruction – Japanese edition (bonus track)
No.	Title	Writer(s)	Length
13.	"Little Slice"	Brooks; Dvoskin	3:25
Total length:			53:39

== Personnel ==
Credits are adapted from the liner notes of Deconstruction.

Production

- Meredith Brooks – vocals, writer, producer
- David Darling – producer, programming
- Melanie Safka – writer
- Queen Latifah – vocals, writer
- Larry Dvoskin – writer
- Shelly Peiken – writer
- Rick Nowels – writer
- Adam Gorgoni – writer
- Brian Reeves – engineering
- Scott Humphries – mixing
- Paul Fox – producer
- Jeff Tomei – engineering
- Mark Needham – mixing
- Tom Weir – engineering
- John Bogosian – engineering
- David Bryant – assistant engineer
- Michael Parnell – assistant engineer
- Chris Lord-Alge – mixing
- Matt Silva – mixing assistant
- Steve Genewick – mixing assistant
- Doug Sax – mastering

Instruments

- Meredith Brooks – guitars
- Rob Ladd – drums
- Paul Bushnell – drums, bass
- Michael Parnell – keyboards
- David Darling – percussion, keyboards, bass
- Paul Trudeau – percussion, keyboards, piano
- Crenshaw High School Elite Choir – background vocals
- Mark Meadows – bass
- Matt Laug – drums
- David Faragher – bass
- Arlen Shirebaum – keyboards
- Denny Fongheiser – drums
- Rami Jaffe – keyboards

== Charts ==
Weekly chart performance for Deconstruction
Chart (1999)	Peak position
Austrian Albums (Ö3 Austria)	42
German Albums (Offizielle Top 100)	95
Swiss Albums (Schweizer Hitparade)	30
