= Light in Your Eyes (disambiguation) =

"Light in Your Eyes" is a song by Sheryl Crow from her album The Very Best of Sheryl Crow. The phrase or similar ones may also refer to:

- "Light in Your Eyes", a song by Blessid Union of Souls from their self-titled album
- "Light in Your Eyes", a song by Gotthard from their album Homerun
- "The Light in Your Eyes", a song by LeAnn Rimes from her album Blue
- The Light in Your Eyes, a South Korean television series
