= Bad Bad One =

Studio album by Meredith Brooks
- Released: May 21, 2002
- Recorded: c. 2000–2002
- Studio: Kissing Booth Studios (Los Angeles, CA); Shithouse Studios (Van Nuys, CA); Sonora Recorders (Los Angeles, CA)
- Genre: Alternative rock
- Length: 50:08
- Label: Gold Circle; Go! Entertainment
- Producer: Meredith Brooks; David Darling

Meredith Brooks chronology
Deconstruction (1999)	Bad Bad One (2002)	Shine (2004)

Singles from Bad Bad One
- 1. "Shine" Released: April 1, 2002; 2. "Crazy" Released: 2002

Bad Bad One is the fourth studio album by American singer-songwriter Meredith Brooks. It was released on May 21, 2002, by Gold Circle Records. Following the commercial disappointment of her previous album, Deconstruction (1999), Brooks was dropped from Capitol Records. Brooks subsequently signed to Gold Circle Records and built a home studio to record and produce the album herself, with additional production from frequent collaborator David Darling. Bad Bad One received little commercial recognition, with Gold Circle Records folding shortly after the album's release. Despite this minimal commercial recognition, the album received praise from music critics. In 2004, the album was reissued under the title Shine by Kissing Booth Records. The reissue had a rearranged track listing and included an additional remix of "Shine," which was featured as the theme song for Dr. Phil from 2004 to 2008.

== Recording ==
Brooks recorded over 50 songs for the album over the course of two years before she finalized a track listing of 12 songs. With Bad Bad One, Brooks sought to take more control over her music, resulting in her building a home studio and learning Pro Tools so that she could freely engineer and produce the entire album herself. Speaking on the freedom that this home studio allowed her, Brooks commented: "Musically, lyrically, vocally, and guitar-wise, I realized that for the first time I could do everything I wanted to do. If I didn't like my vocal, I could just go down at 2 a.m. and redo it. It allowed me to develop more." Brooks described Bad Bad One as a complete fulfillment of her creative vision, claiming that she was not under the usual pressure to be "politically, spiritually or romantically correct."

== Release ==
The release of Bad Bad One was met with several delays. The album had two set release dates—April 23 and then May 5—before finally being released on May 21, 2002. Gold Circle Records folded almost immediately after the album's release, resulting in it receiving very minimal promotion. In 2004, Dr. Phil selected "Shine" to be the theme song for his eponymous talk show. This renewed interest in the song resulted in a reissue of Bad Bad One on September 21, 2004, by Savoy Records. The reissue was titled Shine and featured a rearranged track listing and an additional remix of "Shine" used during Dr. Phil.

== Critical reception ==
Professional ratings
Review scores
Source	Rating
AllMusic	3/5 stars

MacKenzie Wilson of AllMusic praised the versatile and carefree nature of the album. She commented: "Meredith Brooks captured the moment and claimed victory on Bad Bad One. She found an inspiration -- it's fiery and passionate while also literate and cathartic -- and ran with it." Michael Paoletta of Billboard referred to the effort as a "welcome return that shows the kids a thing or two." Paoletta highlighted "Shine," "You Don't Know Me," and "Where Lovers Meet" as standouts from the album.

== Track listing ==
Bad Bad One – Standard edition
No.	Title	Writer(s)	Length
1.	"Crazy"	Meredith Brooks; Taylor Rhodes	3:51
2.	"High"	Brooks	3:20
3.	"Bad Bad One"	Brooks; Paul Trudeau	4:45
4.	"Pleasure"	Brooks	4:24
5.	"Pain"	Brooks; Rhodes; Dave Berg	3:35
6.	"You Don't Know Me"	Brooks; Trudeau; Paul Goldowitz	4:27
7.	"Where Lovers Meet"	Brooks	3:51
8.	"Walk Away"	Brooks	4:31
9.	"Your Name"	Brooks	5:20
10.	"Shine"	Brooks; David Darling; Shelly Peiken	3:21
11.	"Lucky Day"	Brooks; Rhodes	3:33
12.	"Stand"	Brooks	5:10
Total length:			50:08

Shine – Reissue
No.	Title	Writer(s)	Length
1.	"Shine"	Brooks; Darling; Peiken	3:21
2.	"Crazy"	Brooks; Rhodes	3:51
3.	"Lucky Day"	Brooks; Rhodes	3:33
4.	"Where Lovers Meet"	Brooks	3:51
5.	"Bad Bad One"	Brooks; Trudeau	4:45
6.	"You Don't Know Me"	Brooks; Trudeau; Goldowitz	4:27
7.	"Pleasure"	Brooks	4:24
8.	"Pain"	Brooks; Rhodes; Berg	3:35
9.	"Walk Away"	Brooks	4:31
10.	"Your Name"	Brooks	5:20
11.	"High"	Brooks	3:20
12.	"Stand"	Brooks	5:10
13.	"Shine" (Dr. Phil remix)	Brooks; Darling; Peiken	2:01
Total length:			52:09

== Personnel ==
Credits are adapted from the liner notes of Bad Bad One.

Production

- Meredith Brooks – writer, producer, engineering, Pro Tools
- David Darling – writer, producer, engineering, programming
- Taylor Rhodes – writer
- Paul Trudeau – writer
- Dave Berg – writer
- Paul Goldowitz – writer
- Shelly Peiken – writer
- Jeff Peters – engineering
- Goldo – Pro Tools, additional programming
- Seth McClain – Pro Tools
- Michael Parnell – Pro Tools
- Tom Baker – mastering
- Robert Zuckerman – photography

Instruments

- Meredith Brooks – electric guitars, acoustic guitars, slide guitars, lead vocals, background vocals
- David Darling – bass guitar, keyboards, additional background vocals, additional guitars
- Abe Laboriel Jr. – drums
- Paul Trudeau – synthesizer, piano, additional background vocals
- Livingstone Brown – additional background vocals, Moog synthesizer, French horn, additional keyboards
- Windy Wagner – additional background vocals
- Jennifer Love Hewitt – additional background vocals
- Randy Landas – bass guitar
- DJ Ginzu – turntables

== Charts ==
Singles

Year	Single	Chart	Position
2002	"Shine"	Adult Top 40	35
