= What Would Happen =

1997 single by Meredith Brooks

Single by Meredith Brooks

from the album Blurring the Edges
- Released: October 7, 1997
- Studio: The Salt Mines (Hollywood); Alpha (Burbank)
- Genre: Rock
- Length: 5:16 (album version); 4:30 (single version)
- Label: Capitol
- Songwriter(s): Meredith Brooks
- Producer(s): David Ricketts

Meredith Brooks singles chronology
"I Need" (1997)	"What Would Happen" (1997)	"Stop" (1998)

Music video
- "What Would Happen" on YouTube

"What Would Happen" is a song by American singer-songwriter Meredith Brooks from her second studio album, Blurring the Edges (1997). The song was released to radio as the third single from the album on October 7, 1997, by Capitol Records. Brooks is credited as the sole writer of the song, while production was helmed by David Ricketts.

== Critical reception ==
Larry Flick of Billboard noted the contrast between "What Would Happen" and its parent album, in which he described the song as a "far-more-subtle rocker." He further praised the song's memorability and claimed it would lessen comparisons between Brooks and Alanis Morissette. A reviewer from Music Week gave the song four out of five, adding, "A mellow offering from the Brits nominee. This is a soulful melodic tune that reinforces the songwriting skills first heard with 'Bitch'."

== Music video ==
David Hogan directed the music video for "What Would Happen". Chuck Taylor of Billboard gave the video a B grade; he referred to it as "[a] satisfying steam bath of seduction and fantasy with an overture of rich colors."

== Track listings and formats ==
- Australian CD single
1. "What Would Happen" (edit) – 4:30
2. "What Would Happen" (album version) – 5:16
3. "Bitch" (E-Team/M2000 Crazy Bitch mix) – 6:58
4. "Every Time She Walks Away" – 3:40
- European CD 1
1. "What Would Happen" (edit) – 4:04
2. "Come Undone" – 4:27
3. "What Would Happen" (album version) – 5:17
4. "Stop" – 5:00
- European CD 2
1. "What Would Happen" (edit) – 4:04
2. "Come Undone" – 4:27
- United Kingdom CD and cassette single
1. "What Would Happen" (edit) – 4:04
2. "Come Undone" – 4:26
3. "Stop" – 5:01
4. "Bitch" (edit) – 3:58
- United States 7" vinyl
1. "What Would Happen" – 5:16
2. "My Little Town" – 3:59
- United States cassette single
1. "What Would Happen" – 5:19
2. "Every Time She Walks Away" – 3:44
- United States CD single
1. "What Would Happen" – 5:19
2. "Every Time She Walks Away" – 3:44
3. "Bitch" (live acoustic) – 3:22
4. "What Would Happen" (Universal mix) – 5:33

== Credits and personnel ==
Credits and personnel are adapted from the Blurring the Edges album liner notes.

- Meredith Brooks – vocals, writer, guitars, background vocals
- David Ricketts – producer, keyboards, drum/loop programming
- Jim Ebert – mixing, engineering, drum/loop programming
- Charles Nasser – assistant engineer
- Mauricio Iragorri – assistant engineer
- Husky Hoskulds – assistant engineer
- Cappy Japngie – assistant engineer
- Bob Ludwig – mastering
- Josh Freese – drums
- Paul Bushnell – bass
- Victoria Levy – additional background vocals

== Charts ==
Peak chart positions of "What Would Happen"
Chart (1997–1998)	Peak position
Australia (ARIA)	89
UK Singles (OCC)	49
US Billboard Hot 100	46

== Release history ==
Region	Date	Formats(s)	Label(s)	Ref(s).
United States	October 7, 1997	Contemporary hit radio	Capitol	
