= Say hello to my little friend =

Say hello to my little friend may refer to:

- "Say hello to my little friend!", a quotation from the 1983 film Scarface
- "Say Hello to My Little Friend" (Awake), eleventh episode of the American television police procedural fantasy drama Awake
- "Say Hello to My Little Friend" (Scandal), the fourth episode of the third season of the American television series Scandal
- "Say Hello to My Little Friend", a song by Blessid Union of Souls from the 2005 album Perception
- "Say Hello to My Little Friend", a level from the 2000 stealth video game Hitman: Codename 47.
