= Flying Blind =

Flying Blind may refer to:

- Flying Blind (TV series), an American situation comedy
- Flying Blind (1941 film), a 1941 American film directed by Frank McDonald
- Flying Blind (2012 film), a 2012 British film directed by Katarzyna Klimkiewicz and starring Helen McCrory
- Flying Blind (album), a 1995 album by Niamh Kavanagh
- "Flying Blind" (Mayday), a 2003 television episode
- Flying Blind (novel), a 1999 mystery novel by Max Allan Collins
- Flying Blind, a 1997 novel in the Cooper Kids adventure series by Frank E. Peretti
- Flying Blind, Flying Safe, a 1997 non-fiction book about the American airline industry by Mary Schiavo
