= See It Through My Eyes =

Studio album by Meredith Brooks
- Released: November 11, 1997
- Recorded: 1986
- Genre: Rock, synth-pop
- Length: 35:26
- Label: Ariola (1986 self-titled), Bizarre Planet Entertainment (See It Through My Eyes)
- Producer: David Perry; Jack Robinson

Meredith Brooks chronology
Blurring the Edges (1997)	See It Through My Eyes (1997)	Deconstruction (1999)

See It Through My Eyes is the reissue of American singer-songwriter Meredith Brooks' self-titled debut studio album. Originally released in 1986 as Meredith Brooks by Ariola, the album was reissued on November 11, 1997, by Bizarre Planet Entertainment. The record label intended to capitalize on Brooks' newfound success following the release of her second album, Blurring the Edges (1997).

== Background ==
Recorded in 1984, the album was originally released as Meredith Brooks in 1986 by Ariola Records. It was released exclusively in Europe and received minimal recognition. In an effort to capitalize on Brooks' newfound success following Blurring the Edges, Bizarre Planet Entertainment reissued the album in November 1997 under the title See It Through My Eyes.

== Critical reception ==
Professional ratings
Review scores
Source	Rating
AllMusic	2/5 stars
Entertainment Weekly	D

See It Through My Eyes received generally unfavorable critical reception. AllMusic assigned the album a two star rating out of five. David Browne of Entertainment Weekly referred to the album as the "spandex-clad skeleton in [Brooks'] closet," further stating that the songs are "blatant rip-offs of ’80s hits."

== Track listing ==
See It Through My Eyes – Standard edition
No.	Title	Writer(s)	Length
1.	"Pick It Up"	Robert Burns; William Burns	3:21
2.	"The Look"	J. Robinson; J. Boiden	3:22
3.	"You're Gonna Miss My Loving"	David Perry	3:00
4.	"See It Through My Eyes"	Meredith Brooks	3:26
5.	"Thunder and Lightning"	Brooks; W. Burns	4:03
6.	"Video Idol"	Brooks; W. Burns; Perry	3:50
7.	"Jessica"	Brooks; W. Burns; Perry	3:50
8.	"Company Man"	R. Burns; W. Burns; Robert Miranda	3:30
9.	"Your Attention"	Brooks; W. Burns	3:07
10.	"Who's Fooling Who"	Brooks	3:57
Total length:			35:26

== Personnel ==
- Meredith Brooks – guitar, vocals
- Bob Burns – drums
- William Burns – bass guitar, vocals
- Robert Miranda – guitar
- David Perry – guitar, keyboards

== Production ==
- Producers: David Perry, Jack Robinson
- Engineer: David Perry
- Mastering: Herb Jung
- Photography: Robert Duffey
- you
