= If I Could Be... =

Studio album by Meredith Brooks
- Released: September 25, 2007
- Recorded: Spring 2005–summer 2007
- Genre: Alternative rock; indie rock; children's music
- Length: 38:11
- Label: Kissing Booth Records; SLG Records
- Producer: Meredith Brooks

Meredith Brooks chronology
Shine (2004)	If I Could Be... (2007)	Celebrating Pride (Greatest Hits EP) (2022)

If I Could Be... is the fifth and most recent album by Meredith Brooks, released in 2007. It is an album of children's music which Brooks states she was inspired to write and record after the birth of her son.

== Background ==
Brooks gave birth to her son in 2004, which inspired her to produce a children's music album. She commented: "It's funny how trying to be the best mom I can be and feeling so happy about it has produced the most inspired music of my whole career". Brooks began writing for the album on the night of her son's birth and she gauged his reactions to get approval for the songs.

== Promotion ==
On March 25, 2006, Brooks debuted songs from the album at the Wisteria Music Festival, an event which promotes music and sound for children and adults. In December 2007, Brooks performed several songs from the album at Still Thankful, Still Giving, a fundraising event in promotion of adoption.

== Track listing ==
All tracks are written by Meredith Brooks.

No.	Title	Length
1.	"Drive the Car"	3:46
2.	"If I Could Be..."	2:10
3.	"Dance, Shake, Wiggle!"	3:04
4.	"The La La Song"	2:48
5.	"Every Dog"	3:25
6.	"What's Your Name?"	3:01
7.	"Ball Song"	2:41
8.	"Why"	3:04
9.	"My Chair"	3:02
10.	"I Did It!"	3:25
11.	"Good Morning to You!"	2:16
12.	"Turn It Back Around"	2:39
13.	"To Dream Again"	2:30
