= The Late Late Show season 48 =

The 48th season of The Late Late Show, an Irish television chat show, began on 4 September 2009 and concluded on 28 May 2010. It aired on RTÉ One each Friday evening from 21:30. It was the first series to be hosted by Ryan Tubridy, the show's fourth permanent host^{a} following the resignation of Pat Kenny live on air the previous season.

Tubridy's first episode as host achieved a 62 per cent audience share, the highest audience for a regular season episode since 1999. Local guests this season included Taoiseach Brian Cowen, his predecessor Bertie Ahern, hurler Donal Óg Cusack and actress Saoirse Ronan. Musical guests this season included Dionne Warwick, David Gray, Crowded House, Paloma Faith, Plan B, Alexander Rybak, Nik Kershaw and Michael Bublé. International guests interviewed this season included Jermaine Jackson, John Hurt, Ant & Dec, Russell Brand, Ricki Lake, Cilla Black, Joan Collins, Cherie Blair and the Hollywood actors Vince Vaughn, Stephen Baldwin, Colin Farrell, Samuel L. Jackson and Benicio del Toro. Former married couple Katie Price and Peter Andre featured in separate episodes in October and December. Kelly Osbourne featured in an early episode in September; her parents Ozzy and Sharon then followed in an episode the month afterwards. Miley Cyrus's interview in December was pre-recorded due to scheduling difficulties; in the same episode Tubridy interviewed Gay Byrne, the show's former host.

The season's edition of The Late Late Toy Show was held on 27 November, achieving an audience share of nearly 75 per cent, a 15-year high. 2 April 2010 episode was the first broadcast on Good Friday in 15 years, while the month ended with an episode broadcast on the night of the death of RTÉ broadcaster Gerry Ryan, a one-time presenter of The Late Late Show. The final episode of the series, which was broadcast on 28 May 2010, coincided with Tubridy's 37th birthday and the monthiversary of the death of Gerry Ryan.

== Tubridy's plans and pre-season events ==
Ryan Tubridy was announced as the new host of The Late Late Show on 11 May 2009, weeks before Pat Kenny's reign came to an end. Tubridy spoke before his first episode of his plans for his tenure as host of The Late Late Show. He declared that the owl was "not dead". He spoke of his delight at securing an Irish sponsor, Quinn Group, which he described as "a nice honest Cavan business", saying he would not be "really happy" if his sponsor was "a big British conglomerate". He also confirmed that there would be a houseband which would feature some of the same members as the Camembert Quartet from Tubridy Tonight. A new version of the theme tune was arranged by Brian Byrne. Terry Prone later commented in the Evening Herald that "the updated signature tune sounded as if someone who had heard the original once was trying to remember it through a hangover". The set, which features a desk of walnut, leather chairs and a backdrop with a pink/purple theme, was designed by Darragh Treacy. The opening of ticket applications was announced on 28 August 2009. Bookmakers began to offer bets for the identity of Tubridy's first guest, with actor Denzel Washington being reported as one of the favourites. Irish Independent television critic John Boland offered Tubridy some tips on being a good chat show host; these included a ban on C-list celebrities, a sense of humour and plenty of surprises.

== Tubridy's first episode ==
"Can you tell me Taoiseach how you're going to stop a bill, for example €9,616 on car hire, while attending the Cannes Film Festival?".

— Tubridy references the excessive spending sprees of Ceann Comhairle John O'Donoghue whilst interviewing the Taoiseach.

Ryan Tubridy's first episode included several high-profile guests, including Cherie Blair, Joan Collins, Sharon Corr and David Gray. The 204-member studio audience included Tubridy's mother. The orchestra was notably cut off at the end before it had a chance to play. The decision by RTÉ to feature music from David Gray was greeted with surprise by Sunday Tribune columnist Ken Sweeney, who noted that RTÉ 2fm had opted out of playlisting his song "Fugitive" despite an attempt by the station to target a middle-aged audience. Gray is popular with that age group in Ireland and his 1998 album, White Ladder, broke Irish sales records.

Ryan Tubridy interviews Taoiseach Brian Cowen, his first ever guest as host of The Late Late Show, on 4 September 2009.

Tubridy's first ever guest as host of The Late Late Show was Taoiseach Brian Cowen which Cowen described as "a great privilege" when live on air. Tubridy praised the Taoiseach for being "very frank and forthcoming", something he thought was "refreshing and I think we'd like to see more of it as a people". The Sunday Independent's front page later claimed Cowen was "unhappy" with the interview. Jody Corcoran, writing in that newspaper, said the Taoiseach was upset over his "mugging" and Corcoran himself was upset over the manner in which Tubridy had blamed the Sunday Independent for bringing up the subject of the Taoiseach "drinking too much". However, Corcoran, a personal friend of Cowen for 25 years, claimed he was alone with the Taoiseach when he spoke to him about his "upset" and that Cowen had been "mugged in a two-faced, Creeping Jesus sort of way by a host who was, as I see it, too cowardly to stand up like a man and ask the hard question on his own". Tubridy quickly apologised to the Taoiseach on air after asking him about his alcoholic habits, and later responded to the Independent's suggestions of a "mugging" by issuing a denial to the newspaper. He also asked Cowen if he "envied" the timing of his predecessor Bertie Ahern who departed the scene shortly before the economic collapse.

"I read what everyone else reads. People might think because they are my children I would know a lot more, but I don't. I read everything you guys read or see".

— Brian McFadden claims he does not know what is going on in the world of Kerry Katona and their daughters.

The interview with Brian McFadden also attracted comment. McFadden claimed he had not directly spoken to his former wife Kerry Katona for four years, was hoping to gain custody of his children—after a string of widely publicised incidents involving Katona, cocaine and tea— and that he had refused €100,000 which he was offered by a newspaper to tell his story as "they will take a couple of things I said and turn it in to a headline and it will go around the world". The interview was widely circulated by the United Kingdom's tabloid media, with Now magazine quoting McFadden's claim that he had not spoken to Katona for four years, and the Daily Mirror repeating McFadden's claim that Katona could not afford yet another court case. Keith Duffy of Boyzone later called McFadden "naïve" to have done the interview and said Tubridy was correct to have asked him why there was such a distance between him and his daughters. Anna Carey wrote a heavily critical piece on the interview in the Irish Independent the following Saturday, calling McFadden a "selfish grown-up brat" who thought he was "an innocent victim" to Katona's "mad villain" despite Katona suffering from bipolar disorder and having "a pretty appalling childhood herself". Katona herself was said to be "infuriated" by McFadden's comments on the show.

Over 1.6 million people watched Tubridy's first episode, a figure which peaked during the Cowen interview. Pat Kenny was not one of these, having decided to eat pizza instead. Tubridy described it as "easily" the largest audience of his career—Pat Kenny attracted similar figures for his debut in 1999. These figures made this the most watched episode – apart from the annual Toy Show – since Gay Byrne retired as presenter in 1999.

== Tubridy's second episode ==
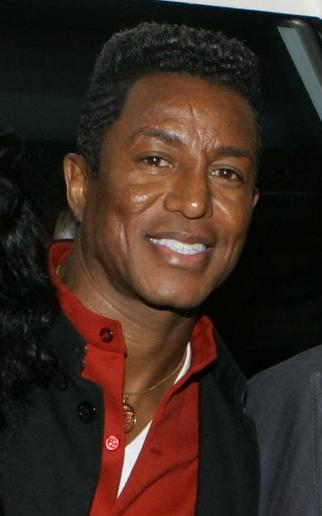
Jermaine Jackson

"I kissed him on the forehead and I said, Michael I love you and I miss you so much".

— Jermaine Jackson tells Ryan Tubridy about how he said goodbye to Michael Jackson.

Ryan Tubridy's second episode featured an interview with Jermaine Jackson who flew into Dublin especially to appear on the show. Jackson told how his recently deceased brother Michael loved Ireland, particularly County Cork where he lived for a time in 2006. He spoke of Jackson's children and their love of movies and animation. He also said Michael's tribute concert would be moved from Vienna to Wembley Stadium in London and that he hoped U2 would play at the show.

The episode, which also featured guests Kelly Osbourne, the Kilkenny All-Ireland Senior Hurling Championship winning team, Moving Hearts and Michael Murphy, attracted 1.5 million viewers. The appearance of John Hurt and his brother Anslem drew the largest audience of the night.

== Tubridy's fourth episode ==
The fourth episode of the season included an interview with Tony Sutherland, father of boxing Olympian Darren, who had died suddenly at his London home the previous week. Tony Sutherland appeared on the show to confirm his belief that his son was not depressed at the time of his death and said he heard of Darren's demise when his wife was informed as they were communicating via telephone. He held his son's medal throughout the interview. Darren's mother Lynda also spoke of how her son had been cut beneath his eye.

== Tubridy's fifth episode ==
The fifth episode of the season, which aired on 2 October 2009, featured an interview with Leonie Fennell and Tony Donnelly, the mother and stepfather of Shane Clancy, a 22-year-old student involved in a murder-suicide in Bray, County Wicklow on 16 August 2009. Fennell revealed her son had swallowed a one-month supply of anti-depressants, had attempted suicide and been given another month's supply before he carried out the act. The College of Psychiatrists in Ireland declined a request to take part in the discussion. Father Fergus O'Donoghue, an associate of the Creane family whose son was murdered, later criticised the interview, saying they had been "exploited" and questioning why anti-depressants were used as an excuse.

Other guests to feature on that episode included British television personalities Ant & Dec, boxer Bernard Dunne and American television personality Ricki Lake.

== Tubridy's tenth episode ==
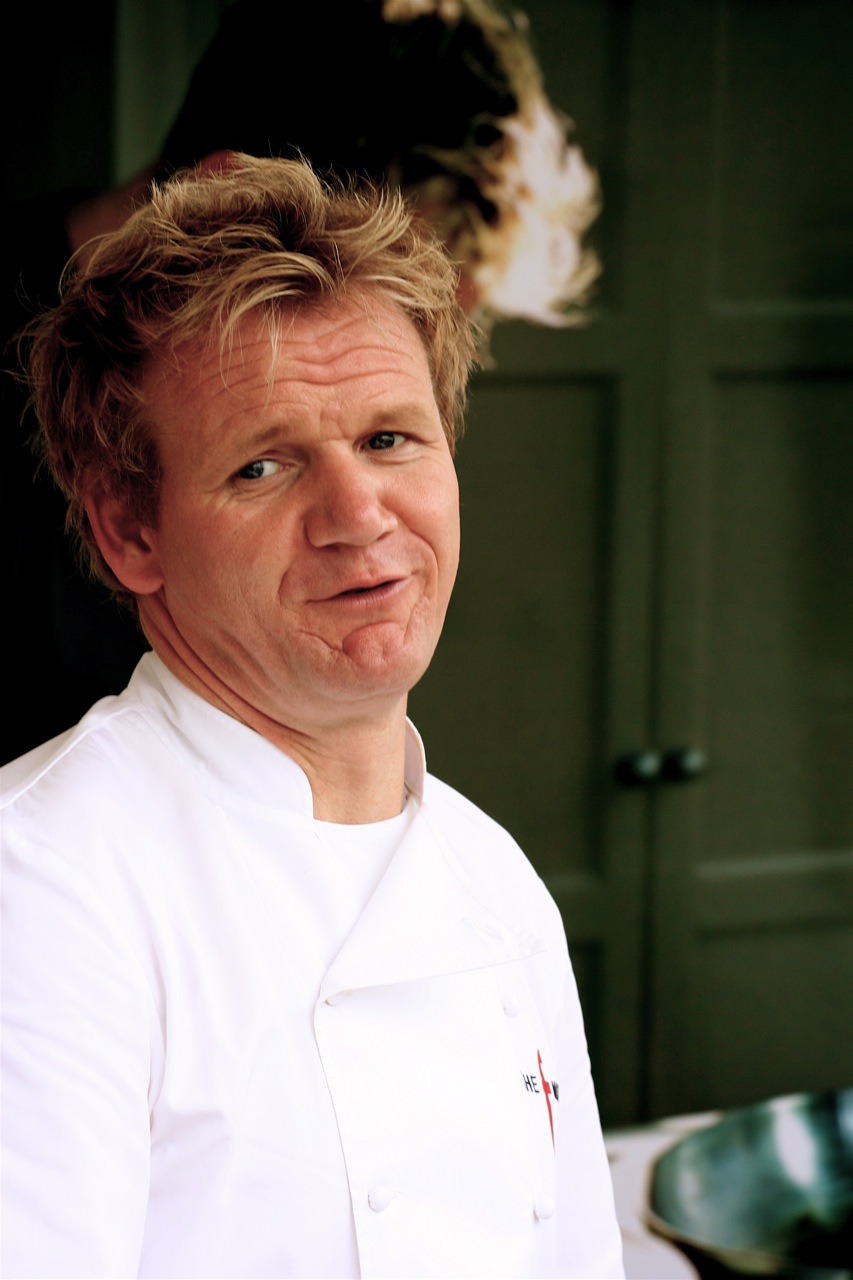
Gordon Ramsay

An interview with British chef Gordon Ramsay led to comment in the Irish media when Ramsay engaged in personal criticism of Tubridy over his appearance. Ramsay compared Tubridy's ears to Dumbo, saying: "Look at those things, you must take off coming down the stairs. I'm surprised you can get through the door". The chef also spoke of his desire to bring Tubridy to one of his restaurants, commenting "You look like you haven't eaten in years. You're too thin. You're like a little windy piece of asparagus". The Evening Herald said Tubridy had been "ridiculed and humiliated [...] in front of a squirming television audience". A spokesperson for Tubridy said he understood the comments as a joke. Whilst appearing on The Ray D'Arcy Show on Today FM to promote The Late Late Toy Show some weeks later, Tubridy responded to the incident: "I thought he was a bit, em, British for my liking. I won’t be buying the books [Ramsay was promoting]. In fact, I didn't take the free one".

== Tubridy's fourteenth episode ==
Comedian Peter Kay made his debut on The Late Late Show, performing "Is This the Way to Amarillo" and "I Useta Lover" and lifting Tubridy off the ground and shaking him about in the air. That episode also featured singer Peter Andre who performed "Unconditional", a song dedicated to his stepson Harvey, and Bláthnaid Ní Chofaigh who talked about her twisted bowel.

== Christmas edition ==
A pre-recorded edition of The Late Late Show was broadcast on 27 December 2009, including Louis Walsh as a guest.

== Tubridy's twenty-third episode ==
Sinn Féin President Gerry Adams was interviewed by Ryan Tubridy on 12 February 2010 when he appeared on The Late Late Show to discuss his family history of child abuse. Adams and Tubridy also exchanged comments on the Irish Republican Army (IRA), with Tubridy's grandfather becoming involved in proceedings.

Tubridy: Did you ever lose a night's sleep because of the activities of the IRA?

Adams: I think that's a glib way to put it if I may say so.
Tubridy: Some people are watching tonight saying "that man has blood on his hands", do you have blood on your hands?
Adams: No, I don't, and you might as well say that your grandfather had blood on his hands.
Tubridy: I was wondering were you going to bring that up, if you want to go glib Gerry, let's go glib.

Adams (later): I wasn't being glib when I was talking about your grandfather, because you're obviously proud of your grandfather he was a member of the IRA, he opposed the treaty.

== Tubridy's twenty-fourth episode ==
Boxer Bernard Dunne announced his retirement from the sport while appearing in a brief cameo in this episode.

== The Late Late Show Eurosong Special 2010 ==
This aired live on The Late Late Show in early March 2010, with the intention of selecting Ireland's entry for Eurovision Song Contest 2010 in Oslo. The jury consisted of Linda Martin, Mark Crossingham, Julian Benson, Larry Gogan and Diarmuid Furlong.

The five selected songs were "Baby, Nothing's Wrong", "Does Heaven Need Much More?", "Fashion Queen", "It's for You" and "River of Silence".

== Attempt to interview Cheryl Cole ==
It was reported in the media in April 2010 that Cheryl Cole would be subjected to a pre-recorded interview due to scheduling difficulties. Pre-recorded interviews on The Late Late Show were considered a novelty at this time, though Miley Cyrus had availed of one the previous December.

== Death of Gerry Ryan ==
"There was such sorrow that I had to go home after I found out. I knew I couldn't do The Late Late Show straight away and that I had to go home to cry myself out in case I did something silly like breaking down on live telly".

— Ryan Tubridy temporarily walked out of RTÉ amid his grief for his friend and colleague.

The edition of 30 April 2010 of The Late Late Show was broadcast on the night of the death of broadcaster Gerry Ryan. Presenter Ryan Tubridy was joined by a selection of guests including the show's former hosts Gay Byrne and Pat Kenny, as well as other RTÉ broadcasters such as Joe Duffy, Dave Fanning, Brenda Donohue and David Blake Knox. Tubridy said on the show that the "country has lost a great broadcaster and I have lost a great friend".

The tribute led to The Late Late Show's highest audience ratings of 2010.

Grease actress Stockard Channing, a guest on that night's edition of The Late Late Show, spoke of feeling like she had interrupted "a stranger's funeral" as audience members were still in tears when she arrived. Channing alleged that no death in her native United States would receive such an emotional reaction.

== Andrew Cowles interview ==
Tubridy's interview with Stephen Gately's husband Andrew Cowles on 14 May 2010 episode nearly reduced Cowles to tears. Cowles was on the show to promote The Tree of Seasons, his husband's book published posthumously. Tubridy responded to criticism by later remarking that Cowles had given "a very solid, brave interview and I know for a fact that he's happy with the way it went".

== Episode list ==
No.	Original release date	Guest(s)	Musical/entertainment guest(s)
1^{b}	4 September 2009	Brian Cowen	Sharon Corr
2^{c}	11 September 2009	Kilkenny senior hurling team	Lumière
3	18 September 2009	The Nolans	The Nolans
4	25 September 2009	Linda and Tony Sutherland—parents of Olympic boxer Darren Sutherland	Paloma Faith
5	2 October 2009	Ant & Dec	Sharon Shannon
6	9 October 2009	Ozzy and Sharon Osbourne	The Magnets
7	16 October 2009	Vince Vaughn	Camilla
8	23 October 2009	Donal Óg Cusack	TBA
9	30 October 2009	Katie Price	TBA
10	6 November 2009	Gordon Ramsay	TBA
11	13 November 2009	Ronan Keating	TBA
12	20 November 2009	Rose Callaly	TBA
13^{d}	27 November 2009	Various children	Westlife
The Late Late Toy Show
14	4 December 2009	Peter Andre	Christy Moore
15	11 December 2009	Hector Ó hEochagáin	Michael Bublé
16	18 December 2009	Miley Cyrus	Miley Cyrus
17	27 December 2009	Louis Walsh	TBA
18	8 January 2010	Charlene McKenna and Aisling O'Sullivan	Beardyman
19	15 January 2010	Brenda Blethyn	Queen + We Will Rock You (musical)
20	22 January 2010	Justin Lee Collins	TBA
21	29 January 2010	Benicio del Toro	Nik Kershaw
Heather Mills's first Irish television interview for 15 years
22	5 February 2010	Stephen Baldwin	The Saturdays
23	12 February 2010	Samuel L. Jackson	Dionne Warwick
24	19 February 2010	Colin Farrell and Neil Jordan	Corinne Bailey Rae
25	26 February 2010	Shane MacGowan and Victoria Mary Clarke	Eddi Reader
26	5 March 2010	Johnny Logan, Dana Rosemary Scallon, Michael Ball, Marty Whelan	TBA
Eurosong special
27	12 March 2010	Boyzone	Boyzone
28	19 March 2010	Tess Daly	Mumford & Sons
29	26 March 2010	John Joe (horologist from The Late Late Toy Show)	Paul Brady
30	2 April 2010	Sinéad O'Connor	Altan
First Good Friday episode in 15 years
31	9 April 2010	Martine McCutcheon	Scouting for Girls
32	16 April 2010	Seán Gallagher and Gavin Duffy (Dragons' Den) and four finalists from the Student Enterprise Awards	Heathers
Heathers reached the top of the Irish Indie Chart following this appearance
33	23 April 2010	Beverley Callard (Liz McDonald)	Zena Donnelly
34	30 April 2010	Stockard Channing	Marianne Faithfull
This episode coincided with the date of the death of Gerry Ryan, who had presented one episode of this show two seasons previously
35	7 May 2010	Jason Byrne	Joshua Radin
36	14 May 2010	Andrew Cowles	Niamh Kavanagh
37	21 May 2010	David Kelly	Crystal Swing
38	28 May 2010	Cast of Riverdance + Bill Whelan, Moya Doherty and John McColgan and Caprice Bourret	Crowded House

== Footnotes ==
- ^a Kenny's predecessors were Gay Byrne and, briefly, Frank Hall.
- ^b 62% audience share, Ryan Tubridy's first episode as host. 1.6 million viewers, the highest audience for a regular season episode since 1999.
- ^c 55% audience share, 1.5 million viewers.
- ^d The Late Late Toy Show, the highest audience for an edition of The Late Late Toy Show for 15 years, an almost 75% audience share.
