= Blessid Union of Souls (album) =

Studio album by Blessid Union of Souls
- Released: May 20, 1997
- Genre: Alternative rock
- Length: 44:47
- Label: Capitol
- Producer: EMOSIA; C.P. Roth (co.)

Blessid Union of Souls chronology
| Home (1995) | Blessid Union of Souls (1997) | Walking Off the Buzz (1999) |

Singles from Blessid Union of Souls
- 1. "I Wanna Be There" Released: 1997; 2. "Light in Your Eyes" Released: January 27, 1998

Professional ratings
Review scores
| Source | Rating |
|---|---|
| Allmusic | 4/5 stars |

Blessid Union of Souls is the second studio album by the American alternative rock band Blessid Union of Souls, released on May 20, 1997 (see 1997 in music) on Capitol Records. Two singles were released from the album—"I Wanna Be There" and "Light in Your Eyes".

== Track listing ==
All songs written by Eliot Sloan, Jeff Pence and EMOSIA except as indicated.

1. "I Wanna Be There" (Sloan, Pence, EMOSIA, Eddie Hedges) — 4:30
2. "Jelly" — 4:46
3. "Light in Your Eyes" (Tommy Sims, Sloan) — 4:16
4. "Scenes from a Coffee House (You'll Always Be Mine)" — 4:20
5. "Hold Her Closer" — 3:23
6. "My Friend" (EMOSIA, Sloan, Pence, C.P. Roth) — 4:10
7. "Where We Were Before" (Sloan, Pence, EMOSIA, Eddie Pomeroy) — 3:24
8. "It's Your Day (Bronson's Song)" (Sloan, Roth, EMOSIA) — 4:39
9. "Humble Star" (Sloan, EMOSIA, Roth) — 3:29
10. "When She Comes" — 3:20
11. "Peace and Love" (Shelly Peiken, Sloan, Pence, EMOSIA) — 4:20

== Personnel ==
Blessid Union of Souls

- Eliot Sloan – lead vocals
- Jeff Pence – guitars
- C.P. Roth – keyboards, co-producer, string arrangements
- Eddie Hedges – drums
- Tony Clark – bass guitar

Additional personnel

- Sean "Sparky" Amann – additional engineering
- Curt Benton – harmonica (1)
- Brian – commentary (9)
- EMOSIA – producer, co-lead vocal (6), backing vocals (1, 3)
- Mick Guzauski – mixing (3, 5)
- Johnjay – commentary (9)
- Jerry Lane – engineer, mixing (7, 8, 10, 11)
- Chris Lord-Alge – mixing (4, 6, 9)
- Tom Lord-Alge – mixing (1, 2)
- Stephen Marcussen – mastering
- Ashley Shepherd - engineer, additional guitars (3, 4)
