= Home (Blessid Union of Souls album) =

Studio album by Blessid Union of Souls
- Released: March 21, 1995
- Recorded: July–November 1994
- Studio: Ligosa (Cincinnati)
- Genre: Pop
- Length: 47:30
- Label: EMI
- Producers: Emosia; Charles Roth

Blessid Union of Souls chronology
Home (1995)	Blessid Union of Souls (1997)

Home is the debut studio album by the American band Blessid Union of Souls. It was released on March 21, 1995, on the EMI label. The album contains their biggest hit single, "I Believe", which reached No. 8 on the Billboard Hot 100. The album peaked at No. 78 on the Billboard 200.

== Critical reception ==
Professional ratings
Review scores
Source	Rating
AllMusic	4/5 stars
Los Angeles Times	.5/4 stars
Pittsburgh Post-Gazette	2/4 stars
The Province	1.5/4 stars
Rolling Stone	3/5 stars

The Los Angeles Times determined that the band sound "like '70s camp counselors leading youthful charges through simplistic would-be anthems of unity and love." The Pittsburgh Post-Gazette wrote: "With mostly acoustic guitar, strings and Eliot Sloane's rich vocals and piano, the songs are consistently pretty." The Province opined that the "foursome drips with sticky-sweet sincerity." The New York Times noted that the lyrics "are as earnest as a self-help manual."

== Track listing ==
1. "I Believe" — 4:27 (Eliot Sloan, Jeff Pence, Matt Senatore)
2. "Let Me Be the One" — 4:38 (Sloan, Pence, Senatore)
3. "All Along" — 3:54 (Sloan, Pence, Senatore, Charles P. "Charly" Roth, Andrea M. Sarmiento)
4. "Oh Virginia"* — 3:59 (Sloan, Pence, Senatore)
5. "Nora" — 4:07 (Sloan, Roth)
6. "Would You Be There" — 4:00 (Sloan, Pence, Senatore, Sarmiento)
7. "Home" — 3:29 (Sloan, Pence, Sarmiento)
8. "End of the World" — 3:42 (Sloan, Pence)
9. "Heaven" — 4:33 (Sloan, Pence, Senatore)
10. "Forever for Tonight" — 5:08 (Sloan, Pence)
11. "Lucky to Be Here" — 5:46 (Sloan, Pence, Senatore, Roth)
12. "I Believe" (extended) — 4:41
- Two versions of the album were released. The difference on the album's cover is the band having simply changed the text from having the band name on the bottom, to the top, and vice versa for the album title. The main differences in these two releases, musically, are the songs "Oh Virginia," and the extended version of "I Believe." Originally, the song "Oh Virginia" featured an electric lead guitar intro, and electric rhythm guitar throughout the track, played by Curt Benton, accompanied by his harmonica playing. The re-released album contains this song in an almost completely acoustic version, with Curt Benton only playing the harmonica. The extended version of "I Believe" is absent from the original version.

== Personnel ==
Blessid Union of Souls

- Eliot Sloan: piano, vocal
- Jeff Pence: acoustic and electric guitars, synthesizers, vocal
- Charles P. "Charly" Roth: electric bass, keyboards, drums, string arrangements
- Eddie Hedges: drums, percussion

Additional personnel

- Curt Benton: guitars, harmonica
- Ted Karras: guitars
- Paul Patterson: violin
- Kevin Hupp: drums, percussion
- Emosia and Mike Star: vocal backing

Production

- Produced by Emosia
- Recording engineered by Jerry Lane and Ashley Sheppard
- Re-mix and additional production on tracks 1, 3, 5, 8, 10 and 11 by David Kershenbaum (for John Galt Entertainment); remix engineered by Kevin W. Smith
- Tracks 4, 6 and 9 mixed by Tony Phillips; assisted by Liz Sroka
- Tracks 2 and 7 mixed by Jerry Lane
- Mastered by Ted Jensen (Sterling Sound, New York City)
