= Walking Off the Buzz =

Studio album by Blessid Union of Souls
- Released: April 27, 1999
- Genre: Rock
- Length: 46:37
- Label: V2
- Producer: Emosia and C. P. Roth

Blessid Union of Souls chronology
Blessid Union of Souls (1997)	Walking Off the Buzz (1999)	Blessid Union of Souls: The Singles (2001)

Professional ratings
Review scores
Source	Rating
AllMusic	2/5 stars

Walking Off the Buzz is the third studio album by the American alternative rock band Blessid Union of Souls, released on April 27, 1999 (see 1999 in music) on V2 Records. It spawned the hit single "Hey Leonardo (She Likes Me for Me)".

== Track listing ==
No.	Title	Writer(s)	Length
1.	"The Last Day"	Eliot Sloan; Jeff Pence; Emosia; C. P. Roth; Eddie Hedges; Tony Clark; Brian Lovely	3:45
2.	"That's the Girl I've Been Telling You About"	Sloan; Pence; Emosia; Clark	3:31
3.	"Hey Leonardo (She Likes Me for Me)"	Sloan; Pence; Emosia	3:28
4.	"Standing at the Edge of the Earth"	Sloan; Pence; Emosia; Hedges	4:20
5.	"Stone Glass Window"	Pence; Roth; Sloan; Hedges; Emosia; Curt Benton	4:11
6.	"If She Couldn't Sleep"	Pence; Emosia; Sloan; Lovely	3:51
7.	"South Hampton Avenue"	Pence; Emosia; Walt Aldridge	4:08
8.	"What Have I Got to Lose"	Sloan; Pence; Roth; Emosia; Clark; Lovely	4:27
9.	"The Rest of My Life"	Sloan; Pence; Emosia	3:11
10.	"Walking Off the Buzz"	Sloan; Pence; Emosia; Jonnie Most; Mark Liggett	3:52
11.	"Real Good Friends"	Sloan; Pence; Emosia	4:05
12.	"Revolution" (hidden track)	Lennon–McCartney	3:42

== Personnel ==
Blessid Union of Souls

- Eliot Sloan – lead vocals, piano, string arrangement (track 9)
- Jeff Pence – guitars
- C.P. Roth – keyboards, bass guitar, harmonica, producer, string arrangements
- Tony Clark – bass guitar, guitars
- Eddie Hedges – drums, percussion

Additional personnel

- Emosia – producer
- Jerry Lane – engineer, mixing
- Ashley Shepherd – engineer
- Tom Coyne – mastering
