= Shine (Meredith Brooks album) =

Studio album reissue by Meredith Brooks
- Released: September 21, 2004
- Genre: Alternative rock
- Length: 52:17
- Label: Savoy
- Producer: Meredith Brooks; Dave Darling

Meredith Brooks chronology
Bad Bad One (2002)	Shine (2004)	If I Could Be... (2007)

Professional ratings
Review scores
Source	Rating
Allmusic	3/5 stars

Shine is a re-issue of the 2002 album Bad Bad One by the singer-songwriter Meredith Brooks, released in 2004. An instrumental version of the title track was the theme song for Dr. Phil from 2004 to 2008. (see 2004 in music).

"Your Name" Charted briefly on South Korea's Digital GAON Chart dated January 9th, 2010 at #80

== Track listing ==
No.	Title	Writer(s)	Length
1.	"Shine"	Meredith Brooks; David Darling; Shelly Peiken	3:22
2.	"Crazy"	Brooks; Taylor Rhodes	3:52
3.	"Lucky Day"	Brooks; Rhodes	3:33
4.	"Where Lovers Meet"	Brooks	3:51
5.	"Bad Bad One"	Brooks; Paul Trudeau	4:45
6.	"You Don't Know Me"	Brooks; Trudeau	4:28
7.	"Pleasure"	Brooks	4:25
8.	"Pain"	Dave Berg; Brooks; Rhodes	3:35
9.	"Walk Away"	Brooks	4:30
10.	"Your Name"	Brooks	5:20
11.	"High"	Brooks	3:23
12.	"Stand"	Brooks	5:12
13.	"Shine" (Dr. Phil Remix)	Brooks; Darling; Peiken	2:01

== Personnel ==
- Meredith Brooks – acoustic guitar, electric guitar, vocals, background vocals, slide guitar
- Livingstone Brown – French horn, keyboards, background vocals, Moog synthesizer
- David Darling – bass guitar, guitar, keyboards, background vocals
- DJ Ginzu – turntables
- Jennifer Love Hewitt – background vocals
- Abe Laboriel Jr. – drums
- Randy Landas – bass guitar
- Daniel Shulman – bass guitar
- Paul Trudeau – synthesizer, piano, background vocals
- Windy Wagner – background vocals

=== Production ===
- Producers: Meredith Brooks, David Darling
- Engineers: Meredith Brooks, David Darling, Goldo Programming, Seth McLain, Michael Parnell, Jeff Peters
- Mixing: Phil Kaffel
- Mastering: Tom Baker
- Programming: Meredith Brooks, David Darling, Goldo
- Pro-tools: Meredith Brooks, Goldo, Seth McLain, Michael Parnell
- Cover design: Marty Rosamond
- Photography: Dana Tynan
