= Meredith Brooks =

American musician (born 1958)

- Born: Meredith Ann Brooks; June 12, 1958 (age 68); Corvallis, Oregon, U.S.
- Origin: Oregon City, Oregon, U.S.
- Occupations: Singer-songwriter; musician; producer
- Instruments: Vocals; guitar
- Years active: 1976–2007 (as artist)
- Labels: Capitol; Gold Circle; Kissing Booth; Ariola
- Website: meredithbrooks.com

Meredith Ann Brooks (born June 12, 1958) is an American singer-songwriter and guitarist. A member of the Oregon music scene, she received international acclaim with her solo album Blurring the Edges (1997) and its single, "Bitch", which reached the top 10 in many countries and earned her two Grammy Award nominations.

== Career ==
Brooks started her music career in 1976 as a member of an all-female band called Sapphire, based in Eugene, Oregon, touring and recording with CMS Records in the Pacific Northwest. Her bandmates were Janis Gaines, Cynthia Larsen, Patricia French and Pam Johnson. Seeking greater success, Brooks pushed the band to move to Seattle without Gaines on keyboards, reducing Sapphire to a foursome. In Seattle, Sapphire recorded at Kaye-Smith Studios at the same time as Heart. When this version of the band split in 1982, Brooks moved to Los Angeles to develop a solo career, releasing an album titled Meredith Brooks in 1986, which saw limited success in Mexico. In 1987, she joined Charlotte Caffey and Gia Ciambotti to form the trio the Graces, releasing the single "Lay Down Your Arms" which rose to number 56 on Billboard's charts. The Graces subsequently released an album, Perfect View, and three more singles, but these did not chart, and the Graces were dropped from the A&M label in 1991.

In 1995, Brooks landed a solo contract with Capitol Records. After two years, her first single, "Bitch", was released, and she was nominated twice for the 1998 Grammy Awards, for Best Female Rock Vocal Performance and Best Rock Song. The single went Platinum in Australia.

Her album Blurring the Edges achieved Platinum sales, peaking at 22 on the Billboard 200 and 5 on the UK Albums Chart. The album was produced by David Ricketts, formerly of David & David, and he also played keyboards (among other instruments) on the album. Brooks toured in the US and Europe in 1997 and 1998 to support the album, and also participated in the Lilith Fair music festival tour in both of those years.

On March 29, 1998, in Argentina, she opened for the Rolling Stones. During her set the crowd demanded the Stones and became violent, throwing objects including rocks and tampons at the stage and bruising her eye. She appeared again the next day wearing an Argentine football shirt, but the crowd again threw things at her, so after singing "Bitch" she yelled to the crowd, threw the shirt on the ground and walked off.

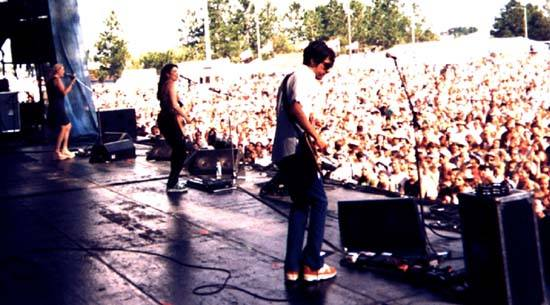
Brooks (center) performing at Lilith Fair in 1999

In 1999, Brooks recorded her third album, Deconstruction. The track "Sin City" was recorded for the movie Snake Eyes.

In 2002, Brooks signed with independent label Gold Circle Records. She worked on her fourth album, Bad Bad One. The label folded immediately after releasing the album.

In 2002, she produced Jennifer Love Hewitt's album BareNaked and appeared on VH1 Divas Las Vegas as a guest guitar soloist with Celine Dion and Anastacia.

Brooks signed a record deal with SLG Records and re-issued Bad Bad One as Shine in 2004. The track "Shine" was used as the theme music for Dr. Phil from 2004 to 2008. The instrumental remix appears as the last track on the album.

In 2007, Brooks completed a children's album titled If I Could Be... She also began developing Portland-area Sony Music Entertainment artist Becca.

Brooks is a member of the Canadian charity Artists Against Racism.

In 2018, the song "I'm a Mess" was a worldwide chart hit for Bebe Rexha. While an original song, it does borrow some of its melody from Brooks' earlier hit "Bitch". As a result, Meredith Brooks is listed as a co-writer of the song.

== Awards and nominations ==
Year	Awards	Work	Category	Result
1997	Billboard Music Video Awards	"Bitch"	Best New Artist Clip (Pop/Rock)	Nominated
1997	MTV VMA	"Bitch"	Best New Artist	Nominated
1997	MTV VMA	"Bitch"	Best Female Video	Nominated
1997	MTV EMA	Herself	Best New Act	Nominated
1997	Billboard Music Awards	Herself	Top Hot 100 Artist - Female	Nominated
1997	Žebřík Music Awards	Herself	Best International Female	Nominated
1998	Pollstar Concert Industry Awards	Herself	Best New Artist Tour	Nominated
1998	Brit Awards	Herself	Best International Female	Nominated
1998	ECHO Awards	Herself	Best International Newcomer	Nominated
1998	Blockbuster Entertainment Awards	Herself	Favorite Female - New Artist	Won
1998	Grammy Awards	"Bitch"	Best Rock Song	Nominated
1998	Grammy Awards	"Bitch"	Best Female Rock Vocal Performance	Nominated
1998	APRA Awards	"Bitch"	Most Performed Foreign Work	Won

== Discography ==
=== Albums ===
Title	Year	Chart positions								Certifications
Title	Year	US	AUS	AUT	GER	NLD	NZ	SWI	UK	Certifications
Meredith Brooks	1986	—	—	—	—	—	—	—	—	
Blurring the Edges	1997	22	30	5	7	5	7	6	5	RIAA: Platinum; BPI: Gold; MC: 2× Platinum
See It Through My Eyes (re-issue of her 1986 debut)	1997	—	—	—	—	—	—	—	—	
Deconstruction	1999	—	—	42	95	—	—	30	—	
Bad Bad One	2002	—	—	—	—	—	—	—	—	
Shine (reissue of Bad Bad One)	2004	—	—	—	—	—	—	—	—	
If I Could Be...	2007	—	—	—	—	—	—	—	—	

=== Extended plays ===
- Celebrating Pride (Greatest Hits EP) (2022)

=== Singles ===
Title	Year	Chart positions							Certifications	Album
Title	Year	US	AUS	GER	IRE	NLD	NZ	UK	Certifications	Album
"Bitch"	1997	2	2	19	12	15	4	6	RIAA: Gold; ARIA: Platinum; BPI: Platinum; RMNZ: Platinum	Blurring the Edges
"I Need"	1997	—	—	—	—	77	—	28		Blurring the Edges
"What Would Happen"	1997	46	89	—	—	—	—	49		Blurring the Edges
"Stop"	1998	—	—	—	—	—	—	—		Blurring the Edges
"Lay Down (Candles in the Rain)"	1999	—	—	96	—	81	—	—		Deconstruction
"Shout"	1999	—	—	—	—	—	—	—		Deconstruction
"Shine"	2004	—	—	—	—	—	—	—		Bad Bad One
"You Don't Know Me"	2004	—	—	—	—	—	—	—		Bad Bad One
"Where Lovers Meet"	2004	—	—	—	—	—	—	—		Bad Bad One
