= Blurring the Edges =

Studio album by Meredith Brooks
- Released: May 6, 1997
- Studio: The Salt Mines (Hollywood); Alpha (Burbank); City Lab Sound Design (Hollywood)
- Genre: Rock
- Length: 50:55
- Label: Capitol; EMI
- Producer: David Ricketts; Geza X

Meredith Brooks chronology
Meredith Brooks (1986)	Blurring the Edges (1997)	See It Through My Eyes (1997)

Singles from Blurring the Edges
- 1. "Bitch" Released: March 25, 1997; 2. "I Need" Released: August 1997; 3. "What Would Happen" Released: October 7, 1997; 4. "Stop" Released: June 19, 1998

Blurring the Edges is the second studio album by American singer-songwriter Meredith Brooks. It was released on May 6, 1997, by Capitol Records. Following the release of her self-titled debut studio album (1986) and her departure from the short-lived band the Graces, Brooks temporarily retired from the music industry. Uninterested in the cynicism of grunge music that reigned in the early nineties, Brooks became re-inspired to write music with a more positive message. Brooks co-wrote the album with her friend Shelly Peiken, with further songwriting contributions from Larry Dvoskin, Christopher Ward, Stan Lynch, John Corey, Kevin Dukes, and Tom DeLuca. Brooks enlisted David Ricketts to produce the effort, with Geza X helming production on a single song.

Music critics were divided in their opinions of Blurring the Edges. Some critics praised Brooks's lyricism and hooks, while others believed that the album tread familiar grounds. Many critics also compared Brooks to her contemporaries, Alanis Morissette and Sheryl Crow. Blurring the Edges was a commercial success. In the United States, the album peaked at number 22 on the Billboard 200 album chart and was certified Platinum by the Recording Industry Association of America (RIAA). The album was also certified Gold in the United Kingdom and received a multi-platinum certification in Canada. Blurring the Edges has sold over three million copies worldwide.

The album was supported by four singles. The album's lead single, "Bitch," was an international commercial success, reaching the top twenty in 16 countries. The song was certified Gold in New Zealand, Norway, the United Kingdom, and the United States, while receiving a Platinum certification in Australia. As a result of the song's success, Brooks is often cited as a one-hit wonder. Follow-up singles "What Would Happen" and "Stop" achieved moderate commercial success in the United States, while "I Need" had little commercial impact. To further promote the album, Brooks made a variety of radio and television appearances, embarked on a month-long tour, and opened for the Rolling Stones on tour.

== Background ==
In 1986, Brooks released her self-titled debut studio album; released exclusively in Europe, the album received minimal recognition. The following year, Brooks formed the pop rock band the Graces, alongside Charlotte Caffey and Gia Ciambotti, who experienced moderate success with their 1989 single "Lay Down Your Arms". Disenchanted by the music industry due to the rise in success of the grunge genre, Brooks exited the group in 1991 and temporarily retired as a recording artist. Brooks explained: "I was really bored with music, to a point, during the grunge period ... I wasn't interested in being necessarily a part of that, and I wasn't finding a lot of interest for what I was writing about." However, Brooks eventually became re-inspired to go against this prevailing trend in rock music and write songs with a more positive message. Brooks began writing music with her friend, Shelly Peiken, which resulted in a song titled "Bitch". In 1995, Brooks signed to Capitol Records after her manager, Lori Leve, played "Bitch" for the record label's vice president of A&R, Perry Watts-Russell.

== Recording and production ==
The entirety of the album—sans "Bitch"—was recorded at the Salt Mines and Alpha Studios in Hollywood and Burbank, respectively, and produced by David Ricketts. "Bitch" was recorded at City Lab Sound Design in Hollywood, whilst production on the track was helmed by Geza X. Influenced by guitarists such as Eric Clapton, Lindsey Buckingham, and James Honeyman-Scott, Brooks set out to play lead guitar throughout the entirety of the album. Brooks claimed that Chrissie Hynde was the album's strongest influence and that she was fearful people would view Blurring the Edges as an imitation of Hynde's work. Brooks cited "Pollyanne," a song about expressing positivity when faced with a cynical partner, as most illustrative of her mindset at the time of writing the album.

== Music and lyrics ==
Brooks described the overall theme of the album as about resurrection. "My Little Town" was inspired by Brooks' experience growing up and moving away from her hometown of Corvallis, Oregon. "Shatter" has a theme of nonconformity, which was inspired by Brooks' efforts to create a record that aligns with her own vision and to not give in to pressures by music industry officials.

== Release and promotion ==
Blurring the Edges was first released on May 6, 1997 in the United States. Promotion for the album began in April 1997, where Brooks performed across the country at small venues to introduce herself to new audiences. The vice president of marketing at Capitol Records, Steve Rosenblatt, explained: "We're going to send [Brooks] around the country and set up little events where it'll just be Meredith and her music, where she can talk to people and talk about her songs, and then play her songs in a very intimate setting." To further promote the album, Brooks embarked on a month-long tour that commenced on August 3 in her hometown of Portland, Oregon. This tour included several stops at the Lilith Fair tour. A recorded performance of "Wash My Hands" was later included on the live album Lilith Fair: A Celebration of Women in Music (1998). In September 1997, Brooks opened for the MTV Video Music Awards through a webcast. This performance marked the first ever multi-camera webcast and was the first time MTV live streamed audio and video. In July 1997, Brooks paid promotional visits to the United Kingdom and Germany, with further performances throughout Europe in September. In 1998, Brooks was an opening act for the Rolling Stones on their Bridges to Babylon Tour. After playing two songs from her ten-song set, the crowd began to boo and threw bottles, batteries, and coins at her.

"Wash My Hands" was intended as the lead single from the album, before it was replaced with "Bitch".

On January 20, 2023, an expanded edition of Blurring the Edges was released in celebration of the album's 25th anniversary.

== Critical reception ==
Professional ratings
Review scores
Source	Rating
AllMusic	3.5/5 stars
Christgau's Consumer Guide	(neither)
Entertainment Weekly	B+
The Guardian	2/5 stars
Los Angeles Times	2.5/4 stars
Music Week	5/5 stars
NME	3/10 stars

Stephen Thomas Erlewine of AllMusic compared Brooks to Alanis Morissette, stating that "Blurring the Edges isn't necessarily a bad album -- Brooks is a competent melodicist and her lyrics are occasionally promising -- yet it isn't a distinctive one." Steven Mirkin of Entertainment Weekly similarly noted that the album touches on familiar material, specifically comparing it to Sheryl Crow's Tuesday Night Music Club (1993). However, Mirkin went on to praise the album as "leavened with hooks and humor and a refreshing, unself-conscious swagger." In a more critical review, Paul Verna of Billboard referred to Brooks as an Alanis Morissette imitator, commenting that "[Brooks'] ample writing and performing talents are underserved by her tendency to follow rather than lead." Johnny Cigarrettes of the NME said that "there's no real bile or bite to the lyrics, nor any great wit or emotional penetration. So it's easy-listening, good-time, bad-time angst rock lite."

Mala Mortensa of Alternative Press noted "Bitch" as a highlight from the album. She further discussed the album's influence, stating, "[t]he alt-rock showcase was a stunning showcase of the 'bad bitch' mentality that largely defines the alternative scene. No doubt, [Brooks'] fiery energy has inspired many aspiring women to date."

== Commercial performance ==
In the United States, Blurring the Edges debuted at number 25 on the US Billboard 200 for the chart dated May 24, 1997. The album reached its peak position of number 22 the following week and ultimately spent 47 weeks on the chart, with its final appearance being on the chart dated April 11, 1998. On the year-end chart for 1997, Blurring the Edges reached a position of number 83. The Recording Industry Association of America (RIAA) certified the album Platinum, which denotes one million album-equivalent units.

== Track listing ==
Blurring the Edges – Standard edition
No.	Title	Writer(s)	Length
1.	"I Need"	Meredith Brooks; Shelly Peiken	4:10
2.	"Bitch"	Brooks; Peiken	4:12
3.	"Somedays"	Brooks; Larry Dvoskin	3:45
4.	"Watched You Fall"	Brooks; Christopher Ward	4:50
5.	"Pollyanne"	Brooks; Peiken	3:14
6.	"Shatter"	Brooks; Peiken	3:59
7.	"My Little Town"	Brooks; Stan Lynch; John Corey	3:59
8.	"What Would Happen"	Brooks	5:16
9.	"It Don't Get Better"	Brooks; Kevin Dukes	4:12
10.	"Birthday"	Brooks; Peiken	3:14
11.	"Stop"	Brooks; Dvoskin	5:00
12.	"Wash My Hands"	Brooks; Dvoskin; Peiken	5:04
Total length:			50:55

Blurring the Edges – Japanese edition (bonus tracks)
No.	Title	Writer(s)	Length
13.	"Down by the River"	Brooks; Tom DeLuca	4:14
14.	"Bitch" (Transistor mix)	Brooks; Peiken	4:07
Total length:			59:16

Blurring the Edges – Expanded edition (bonus tracks)
No.	Title	Writer(s)	Length
13.	"Little Slice"	Brooks; Dvoskin	3:27
14.	"Every Time She Walks Away"	Brooks; DeLuca	3:40
15.	"I Need" (Crusty mix)	Brooks; Peiken	4:58
16.	"Bitch" (live in Germany)	Brooks; Peiken	4:35
17.	"What Would Happen" (live in Germany)	Brooks	6:02
18.	"Wash My Hands" (live in Germany)	Brooks; Dvoskin; Peiken	5:21
Total length:			1:18:58

== Personnel ==
Credits are adapted from the liner notes of Blurring the Edges.

Musicians

- Meredith Brooks – guitar, lead vocals
- Paul Bushnell – bass guitar
- Jim Ebert – synthesizer, bass guitar
- Josh Freese – drums
- Victoria Levy – background vocals
- David Ricketts – bass guitar, keyboards
- Jimmy Woods – harmonica
- Nick Drapela – rhythm guitar

Artwork

- David Lair – design
- Tommy Steele – art direction
- John Dunne – photography
- Shelly Peiken – photography
- Robert Zuckerman – photography

Production

- Geza X – record producer, engineer
- David Ricketts – producer
- Jim Ebert – engineering, mixing
- S. "Husky" Hoskulds, Mauricio Iragorri, Cappy Japngie, Charles Nasser – assistant engineers
- Bob Ludwig – mastering
- Jim Ebert, Geza X, David Ricketts – programming

== Charts ==
=== Weekly charts ===
Chart (1997)	Peak position
Australian Albums (ARIA)	30
Austrian Albums (Ö3 Austria)	5
Belgian Albums (Ultratop Flanders)	9
Belgian Albums (Ultratop Wallonia)	22
Canadian Albums (Billboard)	11
Dutch Albums (Album Top 100)	5
Finnish Albums (Suomen virallinen lista)	8
German Albums (Offizielle Top 100)	7
New Zealand Albums (RMNZ)	7
Norwegian Albums (VG-lista)	3
Swedish Albums (Sverigetopplistan)	13
Swiss Albums (Schweizer Hitparade)	6
UK Albums (OCC)	5
US Billboard 200	22

=== Year-end charts ===
Chart (1997)	Position
Austrian Albums (Ö3 Austria)	31
Belgian Albums (Ultratop Flanders)	94
Dutch Albums (Album Top 100)	87
German Albums (Offizielle Top 100)	63
Swiss Albums (Schweizer Hitparade)	19
US Billboard 200	83

=== Singles ===
Year	Single	Chart	Position
1997	"Bitch"	US Adult Top 40	14
1997	"Bitch"	US Hot Dance Music/Club Play	34
1997	"Bitch"	US Modern Rock Tracks	4
1997	"Bitch"	US Billboard Hot 100	2
1997	"Bitch"	US Top 40 Mainstream	1
1997	"What Would Happen"	US Adult Top 40	21
1997	"What Would Happen"	US Top 40 Mainstream	15
1998	"What Would Happen"	US Billboard Hot 100	46
1998	"Stop"	US Top 40 Mainstream	40

== Certifications and sales ==
Region	Certification	Certified units/sales
Austria (IFPI Austria)	Gold	25,000^{*}
Canada (Music Canada)	2× Platinum	200,000^{^}
Netherlands (NVPI)	Gold	50,000^{^}
Norway (IFPI Norway)	Gold	25,000^{*}
Switzerland (IFPI Switzerland)	Gold	25,000^{^}
Spain (Promusicae)	Gold	50,000^{^}
United Kingdom (BPI)	Gold	100,000^{^}
United States (RIAA)	Platinum	1,000,000^{^}
Summaries
Worldwide	—	3,000,000
^{*} Sales figures based on certification alone.^{^} Shipments figures based on certification alone.

== Release history ==
Release formats for Blurring the Edges
Region	Date	Edition(s)	Format(s)	Label	Ref.
United States	May 6, 1997	Standard	CD; cassette	Capitol	
Europe	July 21, 1997	Standard	CD; cassette	Capitol	
United Kingdom	August 11, 1997	Standard	CD	Capitol	
