= Niamh Kavanagh =

Irish singer (born 1968)

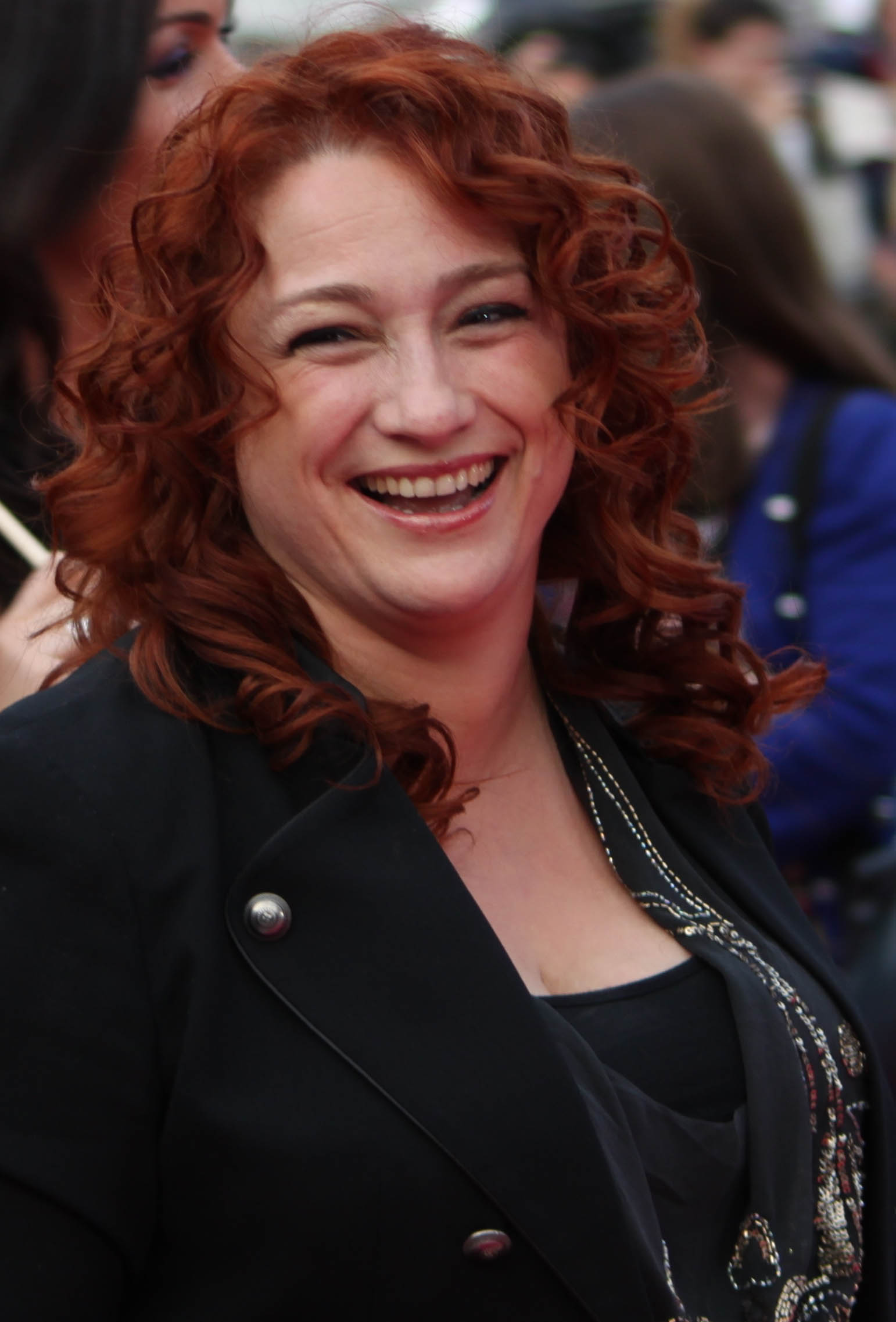
- Kavanagh in Oslo on 26 May 2010

Background information
- Born: Niamh Kavanagh; 13 February 1968 (age 58); Dublin, Ireland
- Genre: Pop
- Occupation: Singer
- Instrument: Vocals
- Years active: 1990–present

Niamh Kavanagh (/ˈniːv ˈkævənɑː/ NEEV KAV-ə-nah; born 13 February 1968) is an Irish singer who sang the winning entry at the Eurovision Song Contest 1993.

The 1993 Eurovision Song Contest was held in Millstreet, County Cork, Ireland. She sang "In Your Eyes" to clinch the second of a record three consecutive wins by Ireland in the Eurovision Song Contest.

The singer represented Ireland again in the Eurovision Song Contest 2010 in Oslo, with the song "It's for You". She performed at the semi-final on 27 May 2010, finishing 9th in a field of 17 contestants, thus qualifying for the Grand Final on 29 May 2010. In the final, she finished 23rd in a field of 25 contestants, having received 25 points.

Kavanagh is highly regarded among fans of the Eurovision Song Contest, and the OGAE Ireland (official Eurovision fan club) president, Diarmuid Furlong, said: "A lot of us would regard Niamh as one of the best vocalists who's ever won the Eurovision Song Contest". While she has enjoyed success in Europe, Kavanagh remains relatively unknown in the United States. However, the singer recorded an album in that country following her initial Eurovision success.

== Early life ==
Kavanagh was born in Glasnevin, Dublin, Ireland. Her father was a singer and a saxophonist. She often sang songs at family parties as a child. Her influences include Aretha Franklin, Ella Fitzgerald and Blood, Sweat and Tears, all of whom she listened to from a young age, as well as Bonnie Raitt.

== The Commitments ==
Kavanagh performed as a lead and backing vocalist on the film soundtrack for the 1991 film, The Commitments, in songs such as "Destination Anywhere" and "Do Right Woman, Do Right Man".

In spite of this, Kavanagh was not prepared for the boost in recognition she received for her later entries in the Eurovision Song Contest.

== Eurovision ==
=== 1993 ===
On 14 March 1993, twenty-five-year-old Kavanagh performed in RTÉ's National Song Contest, which selected the Irish entry for the larger Eurovision Song Contest, to be held in Millstreet, County Cork, later that spring. Opening the show at Dublin's Point Theatre, Kavanagh performed "In Your Eyes" (lyrics and music by Jimmy Walsh). At the close of voting, Kavanagh had won the National Song Contest with 118 points from the ten regional juries, a 39-point margin over the runner-up. This win meant Kavanagh and "In Your Eyes" would go on to represent Ireland on the Eurovision stage in Millstreet.

At the Eurovision on 15 May, Kananagh performed "In Your Eyes" near the middle of the show, as the fourteenth act out of twenty-five. This time, the voting was much closer, and Ireland exchanged the leading position with the United Kingdom several times throughout the announcement of the results. With 187 points (a record at the time), Kavanagh went on to win the competition in a nail-biting finish, as the result was decided by the final maximum score awarded by the last country to vote. "In Your Eyes" went on to be the best-selling single in Ireland for 1993, and reached number 24 in the UK Singles Chart. It went on to become a double-platinum success and Kavanagh was recognised by people on the street. She recorded an album in Nashville, Tennessee, United States, and this album was produced by John Jennings. She later left music to spend more time with her children.

=== 2010 ===
Kavanagh was again representing Ireland in the Eurovision Song Contest 2010, with the song "It's for You". The contest was held in Oslo, Norway in May 2010 (semi-final: 27 May 2010; final: 29 May 2010). "It's for You" was written by Niall Mooney, Marten Eriksson, Lina Eriksson and Jonas Gladnikoff. Kavanagh performed "It's for You" in Oslo alongside her cousin, Niamh Kavanagh, a whistle player, and Nikki Kavanagh, a singer.

Kavanagh's possible participation in Eurovision Song Contest 2010 was confirmed on 10 February 2010 when Ireland's public service broadcaster, Raidió Teilifís Éireann (RTÉ), announced the five finalists for Eurosong 2010, the national final to determine entry. The national final occurred during season 48 of The Late Late Show on 5 March. Kavanagh scored maximum points to beat four other participants.

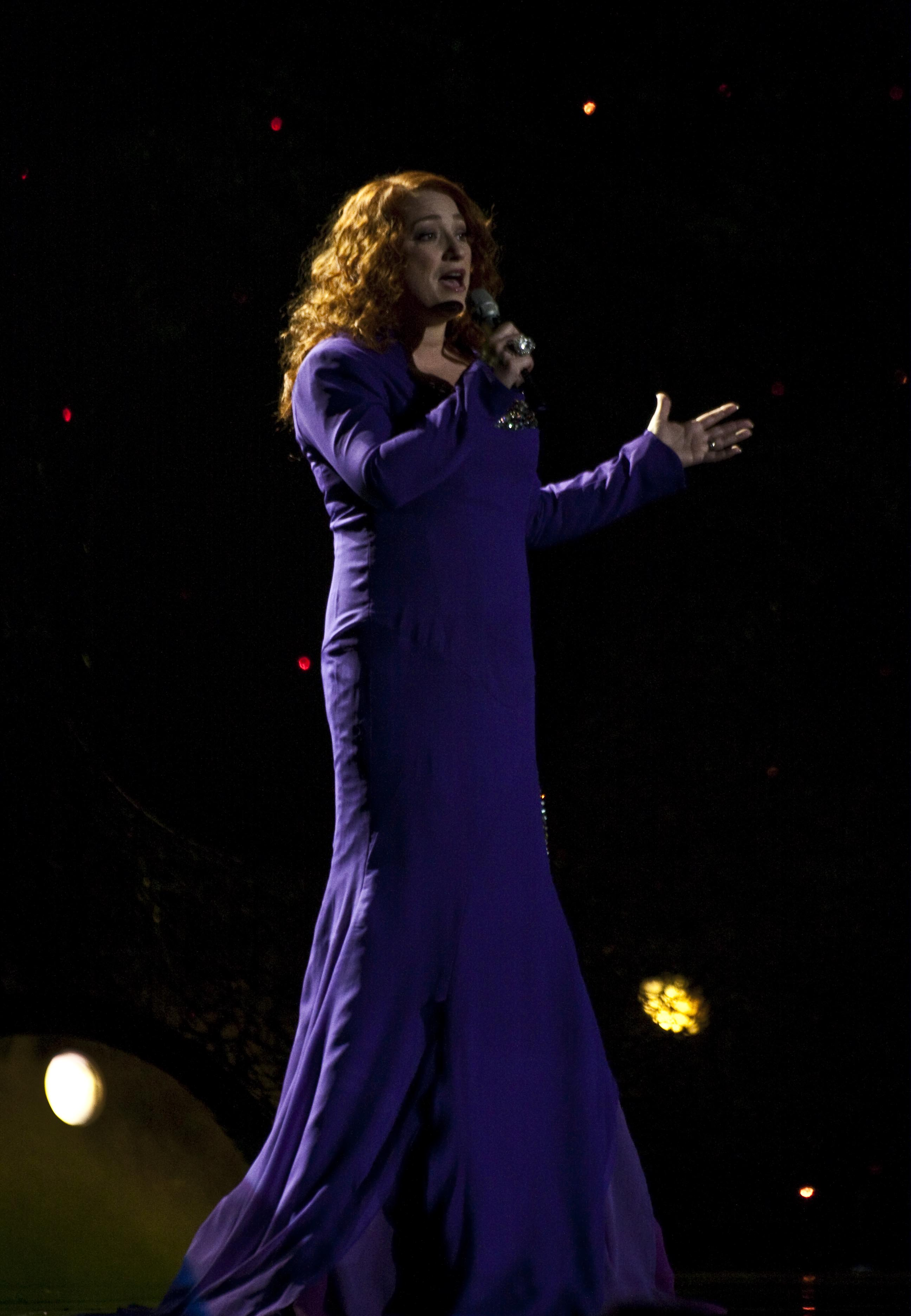
Niamh Kavanagh performing during the semi-final of Eurovision Song Contest 2010 in Oslo

According to The Irish Times, Kavanagh received "enormous support" from journalists and spectators in Oslo, and was much sought after ahead of the event. At the semi-final stage on 27 May 2010 she – along with the other members of the Irish act – qualified for the final, held on Saturday 29 May 2010. Performing 12th on the night, it was the first time in four years that Ireland qualified for the final. The song was the 10th to be performed during the final. At the end of the Eurovision Niamh Kavanagh scored a total of 25 points for Ireland bringing them to 23rd (3rd last) on the leaderboard in front of Belarus and the United Kingdom.

== Other appearances ==
On Sunday 3 September 2000, Kavanagh performed at the homecoming ceremony for "the quiet man of the Big Brother household", Thomas "Tom" McDermott, from Greencastle, County Tyrone, who had just been evicted from the first ever series of the British version of Big Brother the previous week.

Kavanagh appeared on The Late Late Show's Eurovision edition in 2006, to perform "In Your Eyes" along with Linda Martin, and other past Irish Eurovision contestants.

Kavanagh was the Irish spokesperson at the Eurovision Song Contest 2008. She was also the Irish spokesperson at the Eurovision Song Contest 2023, 30 years after she won Eurovision.

On the New Year's Eve she took part in the Romanian National Final for the Eurovision Song Contest 2011 where she performed her 2010 entry in the Contest and the ABBA hit "Happy New Year", alongside Chiara Siracusa and Paula Seling.

In 2015, Kavanagh was a judge in the Irish national final to Junior Eurovision Song Contest 2015. Since 2016, she has appeared as a guest judge.

In 2018, Kavanagh took part in the music video for the Irish entrant for Junior Eurovision Song Contest 2018, "IOU" performed by Taylor Hynes. She portrayed the mother character, while 2018 Eurovision entrant Ryan O'Shaughnessy portrayed the father character.

== Personal life ==
Kavanagh is married to her musician husband, Paul Megahey, from Carrickfergus, County Antrim, Northern Ireland, whom she first encountered in a recording studio. The couple have two sons, Jack and Tom. As of 2010, the family had lived in Carrickfergus for 11 years. Kavanagh once planned to move to the United States to live there, but changed her mind following her success in the Eurovision Song Contest.

== Discography ==
=== Albums ===
- Flying Blind (1995) – Arista
- Together Alone (with Gerry Carney) (1998) – Random Records

=== Singles ===
Year	Song	Peak chart positions				Album
Year	Song	IRE	GER	NL	UK	Album
1993	"In Your Eyes"	1	87	42	24	Non-album single
1994	"Red Roses for Me" (featuring The Dubliners)	13	—	—	—	Flying Blind
1995	"Flying Blind"	—	—	—	92	Flying Blind
1995	"Romeo's Twin"	—	—	—	—	Flying Blind
1998	"Sometimes Love"	—	—	—	66	Together Alone
2010	"It's for You"	8	—	—	—	Non-album singles
2011	"A Fool for You No More"	—	—	—	—	Non-album singles
"—" denotes a single that did not chart or was not released.

=== Guest appearances ===
- The Commitments OST – Kavanagh Performs "Destination Anywhere" and "Do Right Woman, Do Right Man"
- The Commitments, Vol. 2 – Kavanagh Performs "Nowhere to Run" and Backing Vocals on 7 other tracks
- Mick Hanly – Live at the Meeting Place – Kavanagh Performs the track "Heart of Hearts"
- Secret Garden – Inside I'm Singing – Kavanagh Performs the track "Simply You"

Awards and achievements
Preceded by (Republic of Ireland) Linda Martin with "Why Me?"	Winner of the Eurovision Song Contest; 1993	Succeeded by (Republic of Ireland) Paul Harrington and Charlie McGettigan with "Rock 'n' Roll Kids"
Preceded by Linda Martin with "Why Me?"	Ireland in the Eurovision Song Contest; 1993	Succeeded by Paul Harrington and Charlie McGettigan with "Rock 'n' Roll Kids"
Preceded by Sinéad Mulvey and Black Daisy with "Et Cetera"	Ireland in the Eurovision Song Contest; 2010	Succeeded by Jedward with "Lipstick"
