= Close to the Edge (Blessid Union of Souls album) =

Studio album by Blessid Union of Souls
- Released: September 16, 2008
- Recorded: 2005–2008
- Genre: Alternative rock
- Label: Torque Records

Blessid Union of Souls chronology
Perception (2005)	Close to the Edge (2008)

Singles from Close to the Edge
- 1. "Could've Been With You" Released: 2008

Close to the Edge is the fifth studio album (sixth overall) by the American alternative rock band Blessid Union of Souls, released on September 16, 2008.

== Music ==
Close to the Edge contains twelve songs, eight of which are lifted from their previous album Perception. "I'll Be There" is a relatively simple song analogous to the band's earlier work. "Back from the Dead" was written about recovery from addiction. Lead vocalist Eliot Sloan stated of the conception of the title:

Close To The Edge, in its entirety and its title, represents exactly where we are as a band. There’s a sense of urgency in this record that was completely unintentional and I think it turned out better than anyone in the band expected. It’s the record we’ve been trying to make for the last 5 years, and to hear it as a completed work, knowing it’s about to be released to the masses, has us feeling like this is the first record we’ve ever released.

Note: The song If You Were Mine was initially recorded by Marcos Hernandez for his debut album C About Me in 2005.

== Track listing ==
All tracks are written by Blessid Union of Souls.

No.	Title	Length
1.	"Back from the Dead" (new)	4:33
2.	"Could've Been With You"	3:38
3.	"I Still Believe in Love"	4:45
4.	"Wild Side of Me"	4:01
5.	"I'll Be There" (new)	3:32
6.	"A Thousand and One"	4:05
7.	"If You Were Mine" (new)	4:11
8.	"Healing" (new)	3:58
9.	"Closer"	3:47
10.	"I Have Just Begun to Live"	4:03
11.	"She's the One"	4:03
12.	"Let's Get Out of Here"	4:28
