= Light in Your Eyes (Blessid Union of Souls song) =

Single by Blessid Union of Souls

from the album Blessid Union of Souls
- Released: January 27, 1998
- Recorded: 1997
- Genre: Alternative rock
- Label: Capitol
- Songwriter(s): Eliot Sloan, Tommy Sims

Blessid Union of Souls singles chronology
"I Wanna Be There" (1997)	"Light in Your Eyes" (1998)	"Hey Leonardo (She Likes Me for Me)" (1999)

"Light in Your Eyes" is a song by the American rock band, Blessid Union of Souls. It was the third track on, and the second single from, their second studio album, Blessid Union of Souls.

== Track listing ==
CD:

All tracks are written by Blessid Union of Souls

No.	Title	Length
1.	"Light in Your Eyes"	4:04
2.	"I Believe (Acoustic version)"	4:02
3.	"As Long as We're Together"	5:09
4.	"I Believe"	4:37

Cassette:

All tracks are written by Blessid Union of Souls

No.	Title	Length
1.	"Light in Your Eyes"	4:04

== Chart positions ==
Chart (1998)	Position
U.S. Billboard Hot 100	48
U.S. Adult Contemporary	16
