= Blessid Union of Souls =

American alternative rock band

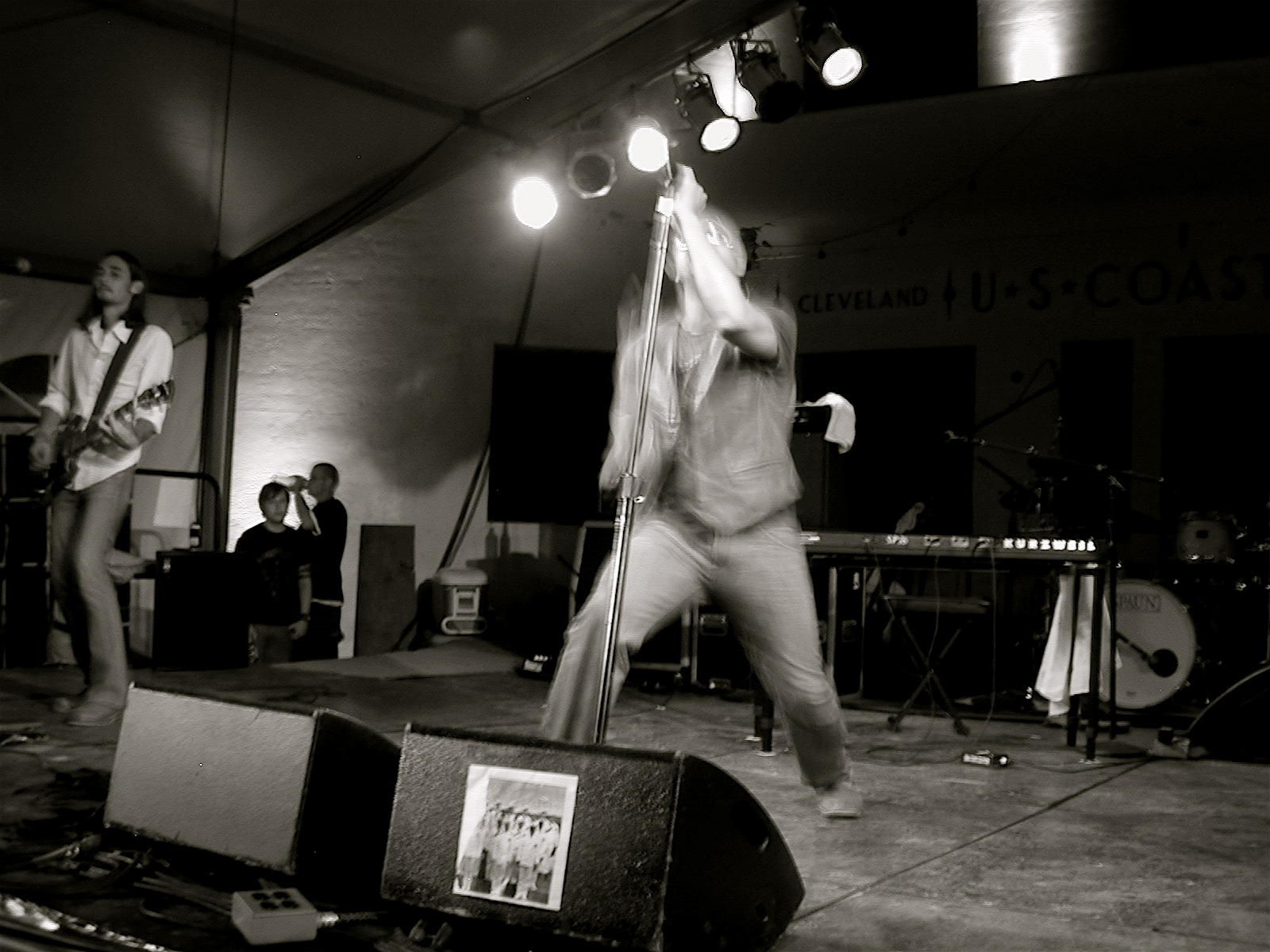
- Blessid Union of Souls preforming in Cleveland, Ohio in 2009

Background information
- Also known as: BUOS, Blessid Union
- Origin: Cincinnati, Ohio, United States
- Genres: Rock; pop; R&B; folk
- Years active: 1990–present
- Labels: EMI; V2
- Members: Eliot Sloan; Brian Lovely; Chris Arduser; David Lessing; Dave Ramos
- Past members: Jeff Pence; C.P. Roth; Eddie Hedges; Tony Clark; Bryan Billhimer; Kyle Robinson; Shaun Schaefer; CJ Lambert; Roland Turner
- Website: www.blessidunionofsouls.net

Blessid Union of Souls (sometimes abbreviated to Blessid Union or BUOS) is an American rock band from Cincinnati, Ohio, formed in 1990 by friends Jeff Pence and Eliot Sloan.

The band's first album, Home, had some success due to its lead single, "I Believe". The song popularized the band with local-area DJs and became the group's most successful song. Their second album, Blessid Union of Souls, did not reach the same level of success as Home, but the band's third album, Walking Off the Buzz, spawned the hit single "Hey Leonardo (She Likes Me for Me)".

== History ==
Blessid Union of Souls formed in 1990 with guitarist Jeff Pence (Morrow, Ohio), vocalist/pianist Eliot Sloan (Cincinnati, Ohio), keyboardist C.P. Roth (who had been in Ozzy Osbourne's touring band), and drummer Eddie Hedges. Sloan and Hedges had previously played together in a band in the 1980s called The Movies (not to be confused with the British pub rock band of the same name). The band's name originated from an episode of the TV series M*A*S*H.

The band was heavily influenced by the cowpunk scene that was burgeoning around the time it formed.

The band released its debut album, Home, in March 1995. Later that year, the album was certified gold by the RIAA. The album's most popular song was the aforementioned "I Believe", with reached No. 8 on the Billboard Hot 100, and No. 2 on the magazine's Mainstream Top 40 chart.

The band released its second album, Blessid Union of Souls, in 1997. This album was not as popular as Home but contained the Top 40 hit "I Wanna Be There" as well as "Light in Your Eyes".

The band's third album, Walking Off the Buzz, was released in 1999. This album was moderately popular due to "Hey Leonardo (She Likes Me for Me)", a single from the album that reached No. 33 on the Billboard Hot 100 and reached the top ten on both the Billboard Mainstream Top 40 chart (No. 8).

The band released Blessid Union of Souls: The Singles, a greatest hits album, in 2001. Roth and Hedges left the band in 2002 and were replaced by Kyle Robinson, and then by Shaun Schaefer on drums and Bryan Billhimer on guitar.

In 2003, the band released Blessid Union of Souls: Play Ball, an album about the Cincinnati Reds. The title track was used to promote the team in their first season in Great American Ballpark. This album did not receive much attention outside of Cincinnati. In 2006, Jeff Pence headed a project in which the band contributed two tracks for Clutch Hits, a CD that featured a variety of artists who contributed songs about the Cincinnati Reds.

The band's fourth studio album, Perception, was released in 2005. Its fifth studio album, Close to the Edge, was released on September 16, 2008, on Torque Records.

The band's debut Contemporary Christian album, The Mission Field, was released on Salvation Road Records through Sony/Provident in March 2011. The first single, "The Only Song", reached No. 32 on the Nielsen BDS Christian AC chart. The video for "The Only Song" was also added to the Gospel Music Channel & JCTV. The second single, "Pray for You", was released on July 15, 2011.

To celebrate the 25th anniversary of its debut album, the band released Home 25, a limited-edition vinyl album that included vintage live versions of Home classics and Home-era demo recordings, in 2021.

== Discography ==
=== Studio albums ===
Title	Album details	Peak positions	
Title	Album details	US	US Heat
Home	Release date: March 21, 1995; Label: EMI	78	1
Blessid Union of Souls	Release date: May 20, 1997; Label: Capitol	127	—
Walking Off the Buzz	Release date: April 27, 1999; Label: V2	143	—
Perception	Release date: May 10, 2005; Label: Ultrax	—	—
Close to the Edge	Release date: September 16, 2008; Label: Torque	—	—
The Mission Field	Release date: March 1, 2011; Label: Salvation Road	—	—
Home 25	Release date: January 15, 2021; Label: Wisconsin Music	—	—

=== Compilation albums ===
Title	Album details	Peak positions
Title	Album details	US
Blessid Union of Souls: The Singles	Release date: February 27, 2001; Label: V2	178
Almost Acoustic (Volume 1)	Release date: October 30, 2007; Label: Alert Entertainment	—
Playlist: The Very Best of Blessid Union of Souls	Release date: 2015; Label: Sony Music Entertainment	—

=== Singles ===
Year	Single	Peak chart positions										Album
Year	Single	US	US Top40 Main.	US Adult Pop	US Adult Cont.	AUS	CAN	GER	NL	NZ	UK	Album
1995	"I Believe"	8	2	24	5	18	6	56	—	7	29	Home
1995	"Let Me Be the One"	29	14	24	24	—	48	—	—	—	74	Home
1996	"Oh Virginia"	—	23	27	30	—	16	—	—	—	—	Home
1996	"All Along"	70	26	—	27	—	58	—	—	—	—	Home
1997	"I Wanna Be There"	39	22	25	—	—	19	—	—	—	—	Blessid Union of Souls
1998	"Light in Your Eyes"	48	25	29	16	—	—	—	—	—	—	Blessid Union of Souls
1999	"Hey Leonardo (She Likes Me for Me)"	33	8	16	—	17	7	—	73	44	—	Walking Off the Buzz
1999	"Standing at the Edge of the Earth"	—	35	—	—	—	—	—	—	—	—	Walking Off the Buzz
1999	"Rev It Up (Nascar Rocks)"	—	—	—	—	—	—	—	—	—	—	Non-album single / Blessid Union of Souls: The Singles
2000	"That's the Girl I've Been Telling You About"	—	—	—	—	100	—	—	—	—	—	Walking Off the Buzz
2001	"Storybook Life"	—	—	—	—	—	—	—	—	—	—	Blessid Union of Souls: The Singles
2008	"Could've Been with You"	—	—	—	—	—	—	—	—	—	—	Close to the Edge
2011	"The Only Song"	—	—	—	—	—	—	—	—	—	—	The Mission Field
"—" denotes releases that did not chart

They also performed a track in Pokémon: The First Movie titled "Brother My Brother" and the main theme for Ace Ventura: When Nature Calls titled "It's Alright".

== Music videos ==
Year	Video	Director
1995	"I Believe"	Michael Salomon
1997	"I Wanna Be There"	Bill Fishman
1999	"Hey Leonardo (She Likes Me for Me)"	Geoff Moore
2011	"The Only Song"	Matt Rozzell
