= I Believe (Blessid Union of Souls song) =

1995 single by Blessid Union of Souls

Single by Blessid Union of Souls

from the album Home
- Released: February 1995
- Length: 4:27
- Label: EMI
- Songwriter: Eliot Sloan
- Producer: Emosia

Blessid Union of Souls singles chronology
"Let Me Be the One" (1995)	"I Believe" (1995)	"All Along" (1996)

Audio
- "I Believe" on YouTube

"I Believe" is a single by the American alternative rock band Blessid Union of Souls from their 1995 debut album, Home. It was released in February 1995 by EMI Records. Vocalist Eliot Sloan wrote the song after the father of his girlfriend "Lisa" forced her to stop dating Sloan because of his race. "I Believe" is the band's highest-charting single in the United States, reaching number eight on the Billboard Hot 100, and it became a top-20 hit in Australia, Canada, and New Zealand. Its music video was directed by Michael Salomon.

== History ==
According to the "I Believe Story" from Blessid Union of Souls's compilation album Almost Acoustic (Volume 1), the song was written by vocalist Eliot Sloan in the early morning when he imagined the main piano sample that would be used in the song and then played it.

I always tell people, and it's the truth, 'I Believe' was written in the middle of the night at about three in the morning. I always used to live in downtown Cincinnati, a really cool spiral staircase up to my bedroom, which kind of ended up as my studio. I kept a piano there that my mother got me when I was nine. In the middle of the night I was hearing the melody and I thought, 'this is pretty.' I just had to get up and play it.

Eliot Sloan stated in an interview with The Celebrity Cafe that he wrote the song about his relationship with "Lisa", a girl he once dated. Lisa's father allegedly threatened to cut off her college tuition if she continued to see Eliot. They said good-bye and went their separate ways. He said that he still very much missed her, and placed a message in the liner notes of Home: "Lisa, give me a call sometime just to say hello, my number is still the same."

In the 2001 compilation album, Blessid Union of Souls: The Singles, the song was re-recorded in a punk-reggae style.

== Lyrics ==
In an interview with thecelebritycafe.com, Eliot Sloan said "when I sing 'Love will find a way,' I mean 'God will find a way,'" and that he has always believed that "God is love". While the song uses fairly subtle Christian themes, as do many of the band's songs, they tried to make it not sound too preachy.

Well, it's like... when we did that song, we were just like... there were so many things going on in society. We just wanted to do something positive. We just wanted to touch on a lot of points that society seems to be having a little trouble with as a whole. Racism was one of the things we wanted to distill in the song. So we were like, wanted to mention something about a relationship that I was in that people could relate to. It's really cool because a lot of people have been really relating to that. A lot of people have been in relationships where their parents or their friends didn't want them seeing this other person for whatever reason, whether it was race, religion or background, or whatever. We just really believe that love is the answer to this stuff. Without it trying to sound hokey or whatever that's just the honest to good answer. I'm a witness to that. I get along with anybody who's open minded, and who has an open heart to things. That's the same with everybody in this band. We've all got different backgrounds and we all agree on the same things. This is just one of them. There doesn't have to be this much tension out there. There really doesn't. We feel like it's very unnecessary in a lot of situations. We just wanted to install some hope in people and hopefully people will listen to the lyrics and get that out of the song."

— Eliot Sloan, in an interview with the Celebrity Cafe.

On the edited version for radio, the word "nigger" in the third verse is replaced with "brother".

== Critical reception ==
In a review of Home by AllMusic, staff writer Tom Demalon said that the song "revealed the band to have more of a social conscience than similar acts such as Hootie & the Blowfish through the spiritually tinged lyrics." In a review by Rolling Stone, staff writer Paul Evans called the song "all righteous, wide-eyed affirmation". Mark Frith from Smash Hits gave it a top score of five out of five, writing that 'I Believe' "is a very minimalistic ballad about how the world is turning into a horrible place and that love will find a way. Sentimental gubbins of course, but this is so beautifully sung (imagine Brian Harvey at his very best and you're there) so incredibly charming and ludicrously positive. I could listen to it a million times. Deserves to be huge."

== Music video ==
The music video for "I Believe", directed by American music video/film director Michael Salomon, shows the band members singing the song, interspersed with footage representing the ideas of the song.

== Track listings ==
- UK CD single
1. "I Believe" (radio mix) – 3:45
2. "Heaven" – 4:33
3. "I Believe" (original version) – 3:45
4. "I Believe" (Blessid Q mix) – 4:02
- US cassette single

A1. "I Believe" (original mix) – 4:37
B1. "I Believe" (album mix) – 4:17
B2. "Heaven" – 4:33

== Charts ==
=== Weekly charts ===
Chart (1995)	Peak position
Australia (ARIA)	18
Canada Top Singles (RPM)	6
Canada Adult Contemporary (RPM)	2
Europe (European Dance Radio)	18
Europe (European Hit Radio)	24
Germany (GfK)	56
Iceland (Íslenski Listinn Topp 40)	29
Israel (Israeli Singles Chart)	11
New Zealand (Recorded Music NZ)	7
Scottish Singles Sales (Official Charts)	43
UK Singles (Official Charts)	29
US Billboard Hot 100	8
US Adult Contemporary (Billboard)	5
US Adult Top 40 (Billboard)	24
US Top 40/Mainstream (Billboard)	2
US Top 40/Rhythm-Crossover (Billboard)	26
US Cash Box Top 100	4

=== Year-end charts ===
Chart (1995)	Position
Brazil (Crowley)	87
Canada Top Singles (RPM)	33
Canada Adult Contemporary (RPM)	5
US Billboard Hot 100	27
US Adult Contemporary (Billboard)	15
US Top 40/Mainstream (Billboard)	14
US Cash Box Top 100	20

== Release history ==
Region	Date	Format(s)	Label(s)	Ref.
United States	February 1995	Cassette	EMI	
United Kingdom	May 15, 1995	7-inch vinyl; CD; cassette	EMI	
Australia	June 5, 1995	CD	EMI	
Japan	June 16, 1995	Mini-CD	EMI	
