= Flying Blind (Niamh Kavanagh album) =

Studio album by Niamh Kavanagh
- Released: November 1995
- Recorded: 1995
- Genre: Pop
- Label: Arista

Niamh Kavanagh chronology
Flying Blind (1995)	Together Alone (1998)

Flying Blind is the debut studio album by Irish singer Niamh Kavanagh. It was released in November 1995.

== Track listing ==
No.	Title	Length
1.	"When There's Time (For Love)"	4:07
2.	"Romeo's Twin"	4:34
3.	"White City of Light"	6:46
4.	"Let's Make Trouble"	4:37
5.	"Miles Away"	6:21
6.	"I Can't Make You Love Me"	4:17
7.	"Whatever It Takes"	5:31
8.	"Don't Stop Now"	3:50
9.	"Flying Blind"	4:01
10.	"Red Roses for Me"	2:03

== Release history ==
Region	Date	Format	Label
United Kingdom	November 1995	CD single, Digital download	Arista Records
United Kingdom	May 12, 2008	CD single, Digital download	Arista Records
