= Hey Leonardo (She Likes Me for Me) =

1999 single by Blessid Union of Souls

Single by Blessid Union of Souls

from the album Walking Off the Buzz
- B-side: "South Hampton Avenue"
- Released: March 23, 1999
- Studio: Legend Entertainment (Cincinnati, Ohio)
- Genre: Pop rock
- Length: 3:28
- Label: Push; V2
- Songwriters: Eliot Sloan; Jeff Pence; Emosia; Rachel Whitehead
- Producers: Emosia; C. P. Roth

Blessid Union of Souls singles chronology
"Light in Your Eyes" (1998)	"Hey Leonardo (She Likes Me for Me)" (1999)	"Standing at the Edge of the Earth" (1999)

"Hey Leonardo (She Likes Me for Me)" is a song by American alternative rock group Blessid Union of Souls from their third album, Walking Off the Buzz (1999). It is one of the band's most popular songs, reaching number 33 on the US Billboard Hot 100 and becoming a top-20 hit in Australia, Canada, and Iceland.

== Composition ==
The upbeat modern rock anthem was written by band members Eliot Sloan and Jeff Pence as well as collaborator/producer Emosia.

The song references celebrities such as Leonardo DiCaprio, Tyson Beckford, Robert Redford, Luciano Pavarotti, Cindy Crawford, the character of Dirty Harry, and the performances of Steve Buscemi in Fargo and Jim Carrey in The Cable Guy.

== Track listings ==
- UK CD single
1. "Hey Leonardo (She Likes Me for Me)" – 3:24
2. "Hey Leonardo (She Likes Me for Me)" (live) – 3:57
- Australian CD and European maxi-CD single
1. "Hey Leonardo (She Likes Me for Me)" – 3:24
2. "South Hampton Avenue" – 4:05
3. "Hey Leonardo (She Likes Me for Me)" (live) – 3:57

== Charts ==
=== Weekly charts ===
Chart (1999–2000)	Peak position
Australia (ARIA)	17
Canada Top Singles (RPM)	7
Canada Adult Contemporary (RPM)	20
Canada CHR (Nielsen BDS)	8
Iceland (Íslenski Listinn Topp 40)	8
Netherlands (Dutch Top 40)	34
Netherlands (Single Top 100)	73
New Zealand (Recorded Music NZ)	44
US Billboard Hot 100	33
US Adult Top 40 (Billboard)	16
US Mainstream Top 40 (Billboard)	8

=== Year-end charts ===
Chart (1999)	Position
Canada Top Singles (RPM)	47
US Adult Top 40 (Billboard)	41
US Mainstream Top 40 (Billboard)	23

== Certifications ==
Region	Certification	Certified units/sales
Australia (ARIA)	Gold	35,000^{^}
^{^} Shipments figures based on certification alone.
