= Perception (Blessid Union of Souls album) =

Studio album by Blessid Union of Souls
- Released: 2005
- Recorded: 2004–2005
- Genre: Alternative rock
- Label: Ultrax Records

Blessid Union of Souls chronology
Blessid Union of Souls: The Singles (2001)	Perception (2005)	Close to the Edge (2008)

Professional ratings
Review scores
Source	Rating
AllMusic	link

Perception is the fourth studio album by the American alternative rock band Blessid Union of Souls, released in 2005 on Ultrax Records.

== Track listing ==
1. "Could've Been with You" — 3:49
2. "Wild Side of Me" — 4:03
3. "I Still Believe in Love" — 4:46
4. "Bittersweet Sublime" — 3:57
5. "A Thousand and One" — 4:06
6. "Closer" — 3:50
7. "I Have Just Begun to Live" — 4:12
8. "Let's Get Out of Here" — 4:30
9. "How Does It Feel Coming Down" — 4:09
10. "Say Hello to My Little Friend" — 4:07
11. "Reminds Me of You" — 4:04
12. "She's the One" — 4:31
13. "Better Side of Me" — 3:31
14. "Give Her What She Wants" — 4:23
15. "Redemption" — 4:14
16. "I Was Never Here" — 7:35
