= Bitch (Meredith Brooks song) =

1997 single by Meredith Brooks

Single by Meredith Brooks

from the album Blurring the Edges
- B-side: "Down by the River"
- Released: March 25, 1997
- Studio: City Lab Sound Design (Hollywood, California)
- Genre: Alternative rock
- Length: 4:12 (album version); 3:58 (single version)
- Label: Capitol
- Songwriters: Meredith Brooks; Shelly Peiken
- Producer: Geza X

Meredith Brooks singles chronology
"Bitch" (1997)	"I Need" (1997)

Music video
- "Bitch" on YouTube

"Bitch", also known as "Bitch (Nothing in Between)", is a song by American singer-songwriter Meredith Brooks and co-written with Shelly Peiken. It was released in March 1997 by Capitol Records as the lead single from Brooks' second album, Blurring the Edges (1997). The song was produced by punk notable Geza X.

In the United States, the song steadily rose on the Billboard Hot 100, eventually peaking at number two for four weeks. The song also peaked at number two in Australia and Canada and reached number six in the United Kingdom. In Australasia, at the APRA Music Awards of 1998, it won the award for Most Performed Foreign Work. The song ranked at number 79 on VH1's "100 Greatest Songs of the '90s", and was nominated for Best Female Rock Vocal Performance and Best Rock Song at the 40th Annual Grammy Awards.

== Writing and inspiration ==
"This song was born because I was so frustrated, I had 10 years of album cuts and never had a single. I was coming home from a session one day, full of PMS in a big funk, and 'What am I doing?' I thought to myself, my poor boyfriend who I was living with, married to now, he's going to have to deal with this when I get home. And God bless him, he loves me any way I am. I thought, 'He loves me even when I can be such a bitch.'"

— Shelly Peiken talking to The Tennessean about the origins of the song.

"Bitch" was written by Brooks and Shelly Peiken. The song originated from feelings of frustration that Peiken felt in regards to her stalling music career. These feelings of frustration inspired the song's opening lyrics—"I hate the world today"—which resulted in Peiken conceptualizing a song titled "Bitch". Peiken reached out to Brooks to collaborate on the song, commenting: "[Brooks] had a lot of spunk, and I knew she could relate to this idea." Brooks claimed that she was additionally inspired to write the song after reading the writings of psychiatrist Carl Jung. The song was written in a single day in a spare bedroom of Peiken's home in Laurel Canyon, Los Angeles. In an interview with Billboard, Brooks described the song as being about self-acceptance, referring to the word "bitch" as a term of endearment. Brooks intended to reclaim the word, removing the pejorative connotations surrounding it. She further explained the meaning of the song:

I'm not "an angry young girl"—or whatever the phrase of the moment is—but I'm human. It's not to excuse ranting and raving, but I don't think there's anything wrong with having "a mood". I don't think we all need to keep the mask on all the time.

Capitol Records was initially hesitant to release "Bitch" as the lead single from Blurring the Edges (1997) due to the song's explicit lyrical content. The label's vice president of artists and repertoire, Perry Watts-Russell, and producer Geza X both expressed their concerns about the song's lyrics potentially having a negative impact on its commercial performance. Peiken explained that the record label considered censoring the song, although she and Brooks convinced the label to release the song to airplay with the lyrics intact. Following the release and subsequent success of the song, Brooks commented that she believed "Bitch" achieved its intended purpose of being a "celebration of Everywoman's multiple psyches."

== Composition ==
According to the sheet music published at Musicnotes.com by Alfred Publishing, the song is written in the key of A major and is set in time signature of common time with a tempo of 92 beats per minute. Brooks' vocal range spans two octaves, from E_{3} to C♯_{5}.

== Critical reception ==
Stephen Thomas Erlewine of AllMusic cited "Bitch" as an "Alanis clone", critiquing the "semi-profane lyrics to the caterwauling chorus". Other music critics similarly compared the song to that of singer-songwriter Alanis Morissette, with Billboard, Entertainment Weekly, and the Los Angeles Times all making note of the musical similarities between Morissette's work at the time in comparison with "Bitch". Record producer Geza X deliberately sought a hit single that sounded like Morissette's songs, yet he was fired soon afterward even when "Bitch" achieved major success, due to conflicts with Brooks' record label. David Fricke from Rolling Stone remarked its "the notice-me snap".

== Chart performance ==
In the United States, "Bitch" debuted at number 57 on the Billboard Hot 100 chart for the issue dated April 26, 1997. The song spent a total of 35 weeks on the chart, peaking at number two for the issue dated July 12, 1997.

== Music video ==
The accompanying music video for "Bitch" was directed by Paul Andressen in Los Angeles, California. The video features Brooks on guitar while performing the song on a shimmering floral background. Throughout the course of the song, several objects typically associated with women are shown floating around the singer.

== Live performances ==
The song was performed as part of Brooks' opening set on the Rolling Stones' Bridges to Babylon Tour. Brooks left the stage early after the audience began booing and throwing bottles, batteries, and coins at her. In response, Brooks cited the crowd's behavior as misogynistic and illustrative of the dangers of mob mentality.

== Legacy ==
In 2017, Billboard ranked "Bitch" number 50 in their list of "The 100 Greatest Pop Songs of 1997", writing, "You undoubtedly remember the thing for its cathartic chorus, in which Meredith Brooks declares herself to be the spectrum of all things feminine and human — though only one of them was memorable to enough to risk getting censored on top 40 radio. Still, when you listen next, pay attention to the underrated verses; Brooks grinning and teasing her way through a relationship that attempts in vain to pigeonhole her personality (Yesterday I cried/ You must've been relieved to see the softer side)." In 2022, Avril Lavigne cited "Bitch" as the one song she wishes she could have written and she expressed interest in covering the song.

== Track listings and formats ==
- US CD single and cassette
1. "Bitch" – 4:13
2. "Down by the River" – 4:15
- US maxi-CD single
1. "Bitch" (album version) – 4:13
2. "Bitch" (untied version) – 3:56
3. "Bitch" (Transistor mix) – 4:07
4. "Bitch" (Tee's In-House mix) – 6:13
5. "Down by the River" – 4:15
- UK CD and Australian maxi-CD single
1. "Bitch" (edit) – 3:58
2. "Bitch" (Transistor mix) – 4:07
3. "Bitch" (Madgroove mix) – 3:45
4. "Bitch" (E-Team Funky Bitch edit) – 3:05
- UK 7-inch single
1. "Bitch" (edit) – 3:58
2. "Bitch" (Madgroove mix) – 3:45
- European and French CD single
1. "Bitch" (edit) – 4:12
2. "Bitch" (Transistor mix) – 4:07
- European maxi-CD single
1. "Bitch" (edit) – 3:58
2. "Bitch" (untied version) – 3:56
3. "Bitch" (Todd Terry's Inhouse mix) – 6:13
4. "Down by the River" – 4:15
- Japanese CD single
1. "Bitch" – 4:13
2. "Down by the River" – 4:14
3. "Bitch" (Transistor mix) – 4:07

== Credits and personnel ==
Credits and personnel are adapted from Blurring the Edges album booklet.

Studios

- Recorded at City Lab Sound Design (Hollywood, California)
- Mixed at Sunset Sound Factory (Hollywood, California)
- Mastered at Gateway Mastering (Portland, Maine)

Personnel

- Meredith Brooks – writing, vocals, background vocals, guitars
- Shelly Peiken – writing
- Paul Bushnell – bass
- David Ricketts – keyboards
- Josh Freese – drums
- Geza X – drum loop programming, production, engineering
- Jim Ebert – mixing, engineering
- Bob Ludwig – mastering

== Charts ==
=== Weekly charts ===
1997–1998 weekly chart performance for "Bitch"
Chart (1997–1998)	Peak position
Australia (ARIA)	2
Austria (Ö3 Austria Top 40)	5
Belgium (Ultratop 50 Flanders)	5
Belgium (Ultratop 50 Wallonia)	28
Canada Top Singles (RPM)	2
Canada Rock/Alternative (RPM)	22
Denmark (IFPI)	16
Europe (Eurochart Hot 100)	9
France (SNEP)	42
Germany (GfK)	19
Iceland (Íslenski Listinn Topp 40)	3
Ireland (IRMA)	12
Israel (Israeli Singles Chart)	7
Italy Airplay (Music & Media)	1
Netherlands (Dutch Top 40)	12
Netherlands (Single Top 100)	15
New Zealand (Recorded Music NZ)	4
Norway (VG-lista)	5
Scottish Singles Sales (Official Charts)	6
Sweden (Sverigetopplistan)	12
Switzerland (Schweizer Hitparade)	10
UK Singles (Official Charts)	6
US Billboard Hot 100	2
US Adult Top 40 (Billboard)	14
US Dance Club Play (Billboard)	34
US Modern Rock Tracks (Billboard)	4
US Top 40/Mainstream (Billboard)	1

2026 weekly chart performance for "Bitch"
Chart (2026)	Peak position
Poland (Polish Airplay Top 100)	78

=== Year-end charts ===
1997 year-end chart performance for "Bitch"
Chart (1997)	Position
Australia (ARIA)	16
Austria (Ö3 Austria Top 40)	26
Belgium (Ultratop 50 Flanders)	28
Canada Top Singles (RPM)	34
Europe (Eurochart Hot 100)	45
Germany (Media Control)	74
Iceland (Íslenski Listinn Topp 40)	7
Netherlands (Dutch Top 40)	63
Netherlands (Single Top 100)	52
Romania (Romanian Top 100)	41
Sweden (Topplistan)	45
Switzerland (Schweizer Hitparade)	26
UK Singles (OCC)	52
US Billboard Hot 100	15
US Adult Top 40 (Billboard)	29
US Modern Rock Tracks (Billboard)	31
US Top 40/Mainstream (Billboard)	12

1998 year-end chart performance for "Bitch"
Chart (1998)	Position
Canada Top Singles (RPM)	87

== Certifications and sales ==
Certifications and sales for "Bitch"
Region	Certification	Certified units/sales
Australia (ARIA)	Platinum	70,000^{^}
New Zealand (RMNZ)	Platinum	30,000^{‡}
Norway (IFPI Norway)	Gold	
United Kingdom (BPI)	Platinum	600,000^{‡}
United States (RIAA)	Gold	1,100,000
^{^} Shipments figures based on certification alone.^{‡} Sales+streaming figures based on certification alone.

== Release history ==
Release dates and formats for "Bitch"
Region	Date	Format(s)	Label(s)	Ref.
United States	March 25, 1997	Modern rock radio	Capitol	
United States	April 29, 1997	Contemporary hit radio	Capitol	
United States	May 20, 1997	CD	Capitol	
Japan	June 27, 1997	CD	Capitol	
United Kingdom	July 21, 1997	7-inch vinyl; CD; cassette	Capitol	

== Covers and parodies ==
In 2000, Australian comedian Chris Franklin released a parody of the song titled "Bloke" with the lyrics changed to reflect the stereotypical Australian male lifestyle. The song peaked at number one on the Australian ARIA Singles Chart.

American comedy music group Raymond and Scum parodied the song as "Blair Witch", a parody about the film The Blair Witch Project (1999). Kim Gordon of the band Sonic Youth has stated that their song "Female Mechanic Now on Duty" was inspired by "Bitch". "It's worth mentioning," says Kim, "that the song, 'Female Mechanic on Duty' was inspired by 'Bitch' by that famous Lilith-type female singer, Meredith Brooks. It's an answer song." In 2016, Britney Spears gave a spoken word performance of the song during her Britney: Piece of Me concert residency.

In the 2025 episodic video game Dispatch, the character Flambae (voiced by Lance Cantstopolis) sings a version of the song re-written as a diss track about his supervisor, Robert.

Singer and rapper Lizzo interpolated the chorus to "Bitch", on her 2026 single of the same name.

=== Charts ===
Chart performance for Lizzo version
Chart (2026)	Peak position
Nicaragua Anglo Airplay (Monitor Latino)	4

== See also ==
- List of Billboard Mainstream Top 40 number-one songs of the 1990s
