= Vajazzle =

Genital decoration using crystal ornaments

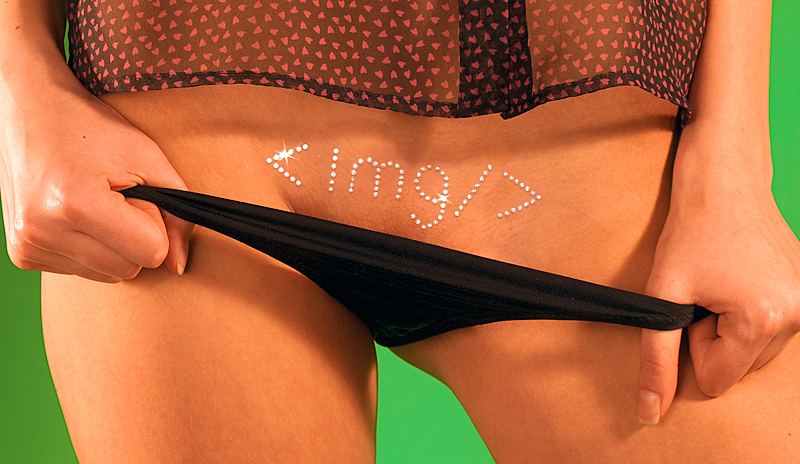
A vajazzle of an HTML tag

A vajazzle, also occasionally spelled vagazzle and sometimes nicknamed glitter pubes, is a form of genital decoration. The word is a portmanteau of vajayjay (a euphemism for vagina) and bedazzle. (Note: A Bedazzler is a home appliance used to fasten rhinestones to cloth.) The process of creating a vajazzle is known as vajazzling. It involves the application of crystal ornaments onto the shaved mons pubis of a woman.

Vajazzling is typically carried out at beauty salons. Initially any pubic hair is removed from the mons pubis, typically by a bikini wax, after which rhinestones, Swarovski crystals or gemstones are glued onto the area. The result can last for up to seven days. The purpose of vajazzling is the visual aesthetic. There are no benefits in terms of sexual pleasure. Bruising or cuts can occur from the crystals during sexual intercourse. If glue is applied too soon after the pubic hair removal, it can cause an allergic reaction or bacterial infection. Vajazzling can also increase the risks of infection if it is not properly cleaned.

== History ==
Vajazzling was popularized by the American actress Jennifer Love Hewitt, who devoted a chapter in her book The Day I Shot Cupid to vajazzling. During a promotional interview on Lopez Tonight in 2010, she encouraged the female members of her audience "to vajazzle their vajayjays". In the United Kingdom, this concept was popularized when beautician Amy Childs appeared in a television show The Only Way Is Essex in 2010. By 2011, an Internet rating site for vajazzling called Rate My Vajazzle had been set up.

== See also ==
- Genital tattooing
- Labia piercing
- Passion Dust
