= Genital tattooing =

Tattooing of the genitals

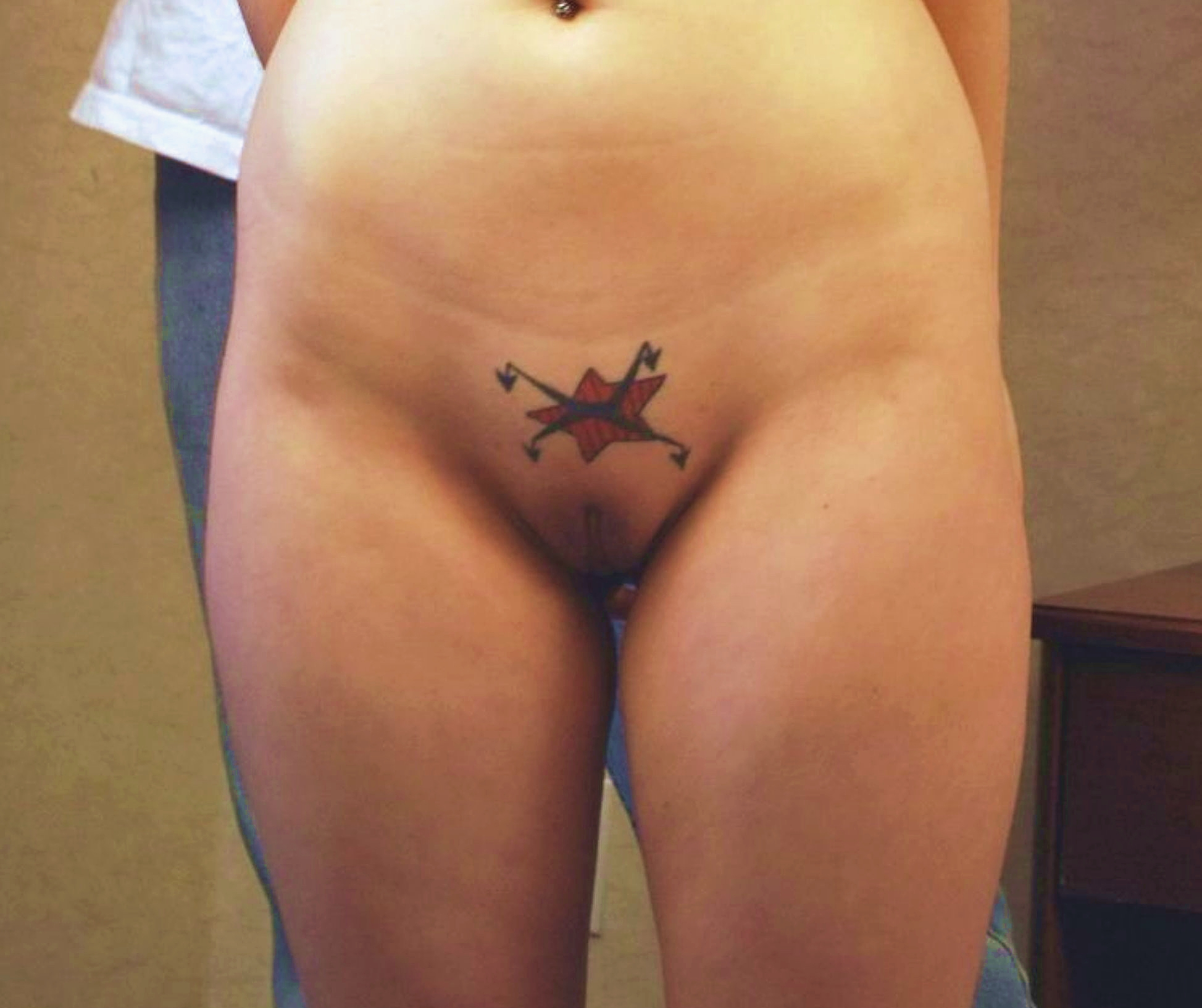
Tattoo on the mons pubis

Genital tattooing is the practice of placing permanent marks under the skin of the genitals in the form of tattoos.

== Occurrence ==
As of 2004, genital tattoos are still relatively rare, though tattoos in general have enjoyed an upsurge of popularity, particularly in the west and among younger people. There are several probable reasons for this: the genital area is sensitive, it is not often publicly visible, and is covered with pubic hair unless this is intentionally removed. Also, some tattooists refuse to place tattoos in these (and other) areas for a variety of reasons.

Genital tattooing may have been decorative surgeries practiced during Paleolithic times and archaeological evidence has survived to this day. Evidence regarding explicit genital male representations were found in art made in Europe approximately 38,000 to 11,000 years ago. However, the primitive meaning of genital ornamentation is not clearly defined.

== Motivation ==
As any other forms of tattoos, the choice may be decorative and genital tattoo designs have been created to decoratively imitate pubic hair, to enhance the appearance of the genitals, or to create whimsical or other designs around the genital area. Some men have incorporated genital tattooing into the creation of a tattoo design in such a way that the penis becomes a part of the overall design motif (for example, as a "nose" in a tattooed face, or as the "trunk" of an elephant).

Women have created similar designs, incorporating their genitals into tattooed designs like faces and animals. This practice has long been a part of tattooing, and examples can be seen incorporating the nipples and other parts of the body into designs.

Some heavily tattooed people choose to have their genital and anal regions tattooed to complete the work they have over much of their bodies. Others have used genital tattooing in a BDSM context, for example to indicate "ownership" of a submissive by a dominant.

== Anatomical locations ==
Nearly the entire genital region can be tattooed, including the shaft and head of the penis, the skin of the scrotum, the pubic region and the outer labia.

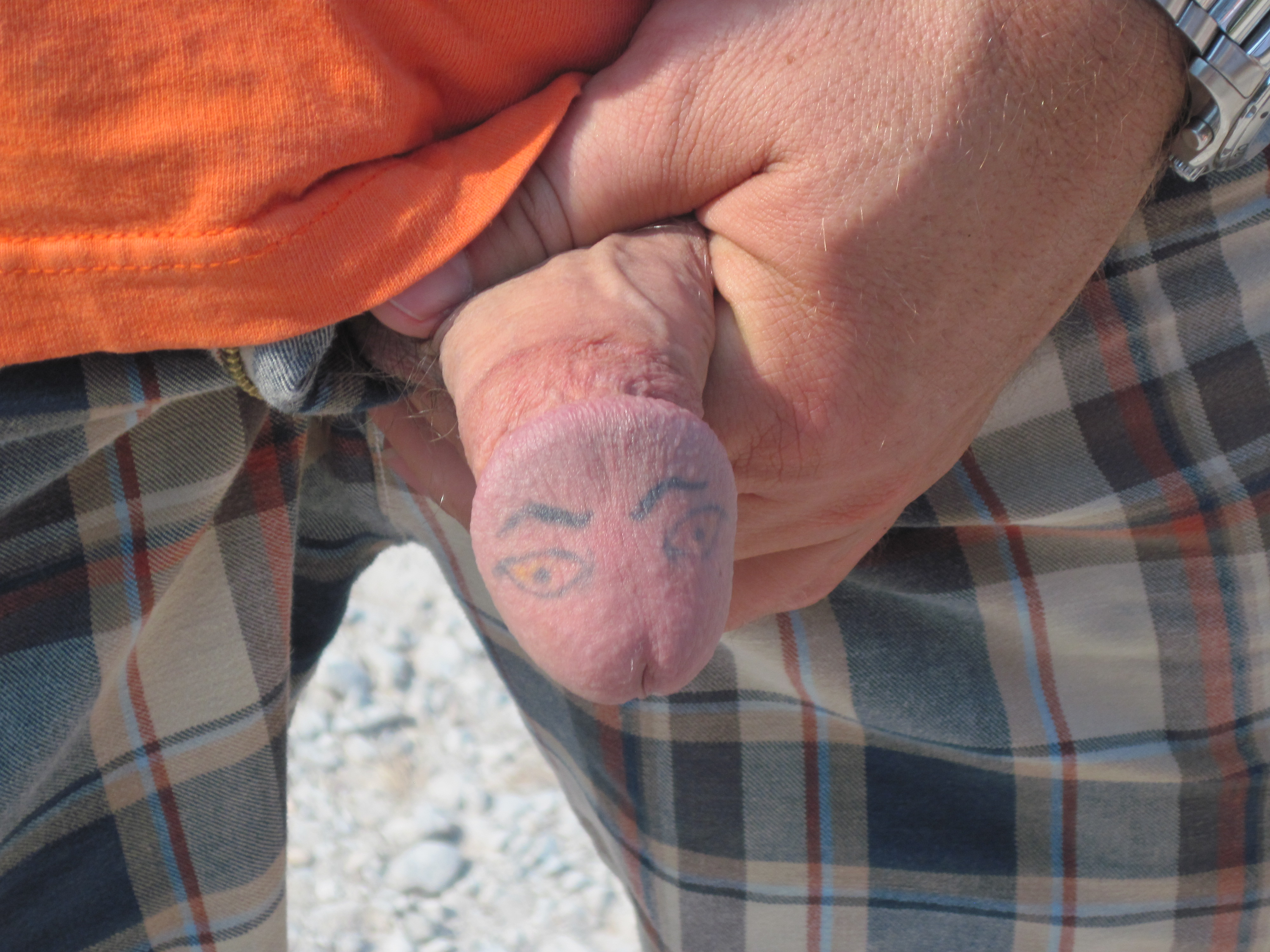
Glans penis

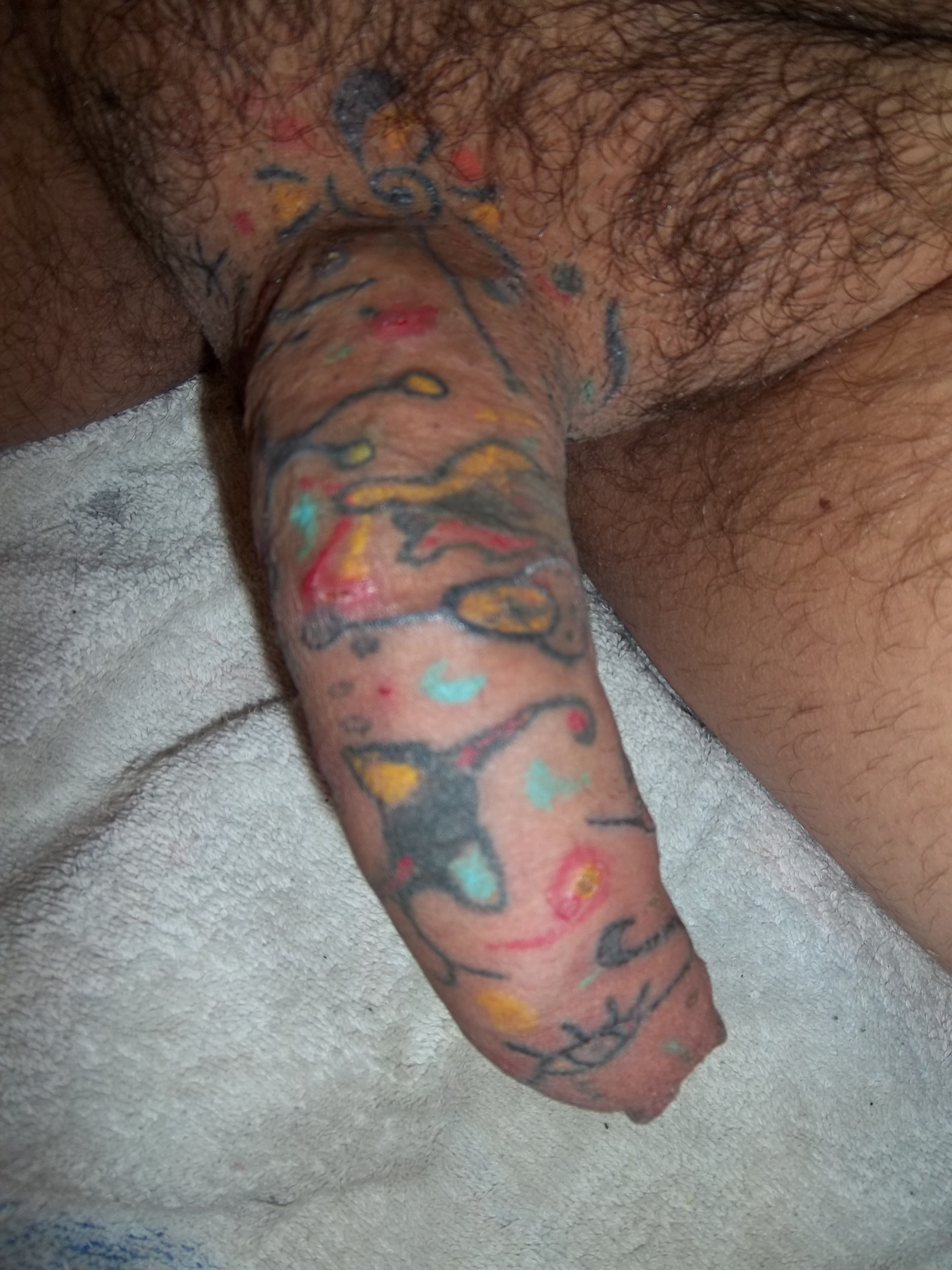
Penis

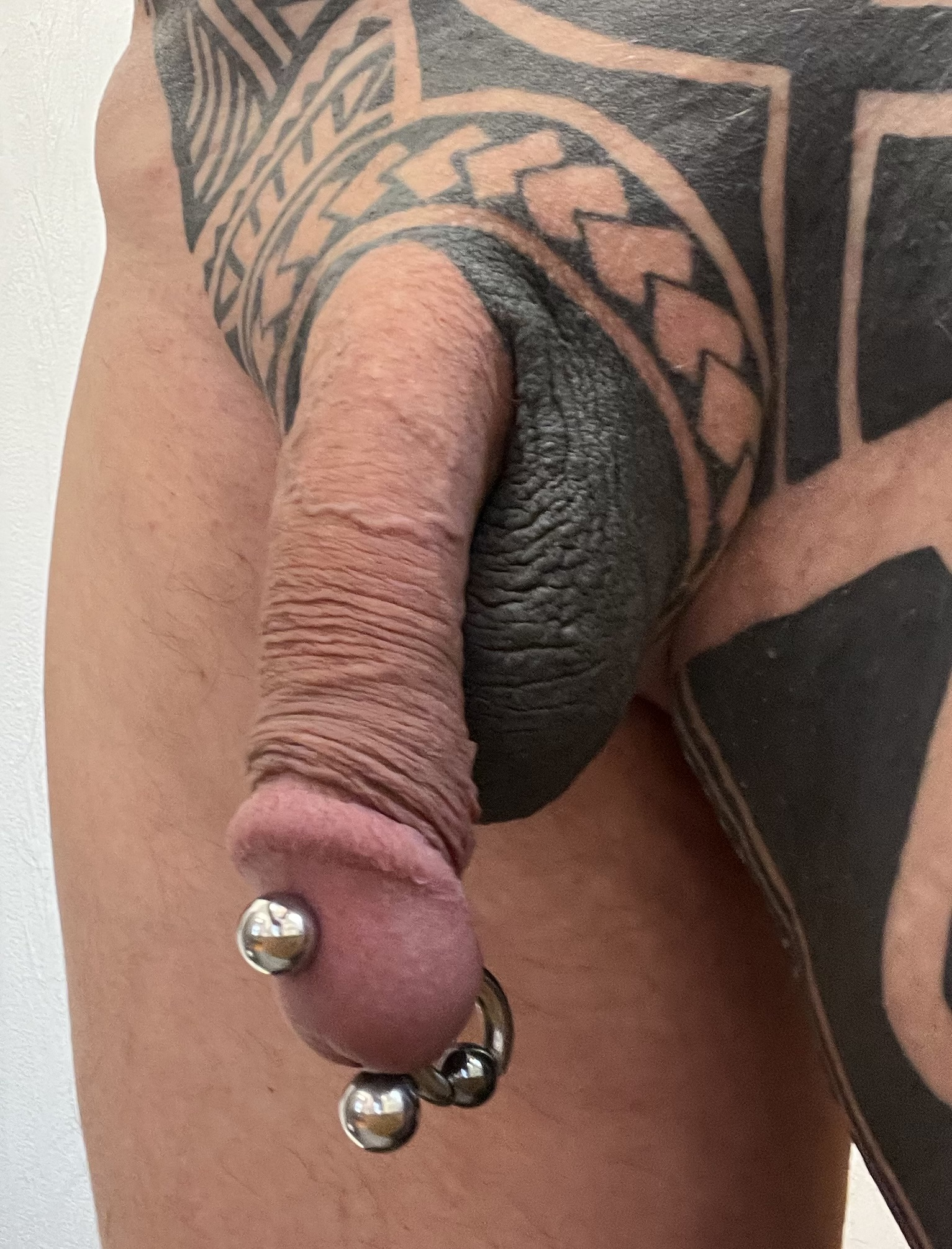
Scrotum

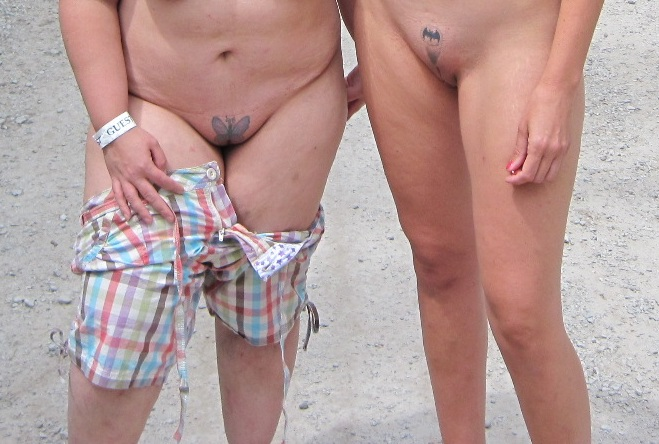
Vulvas

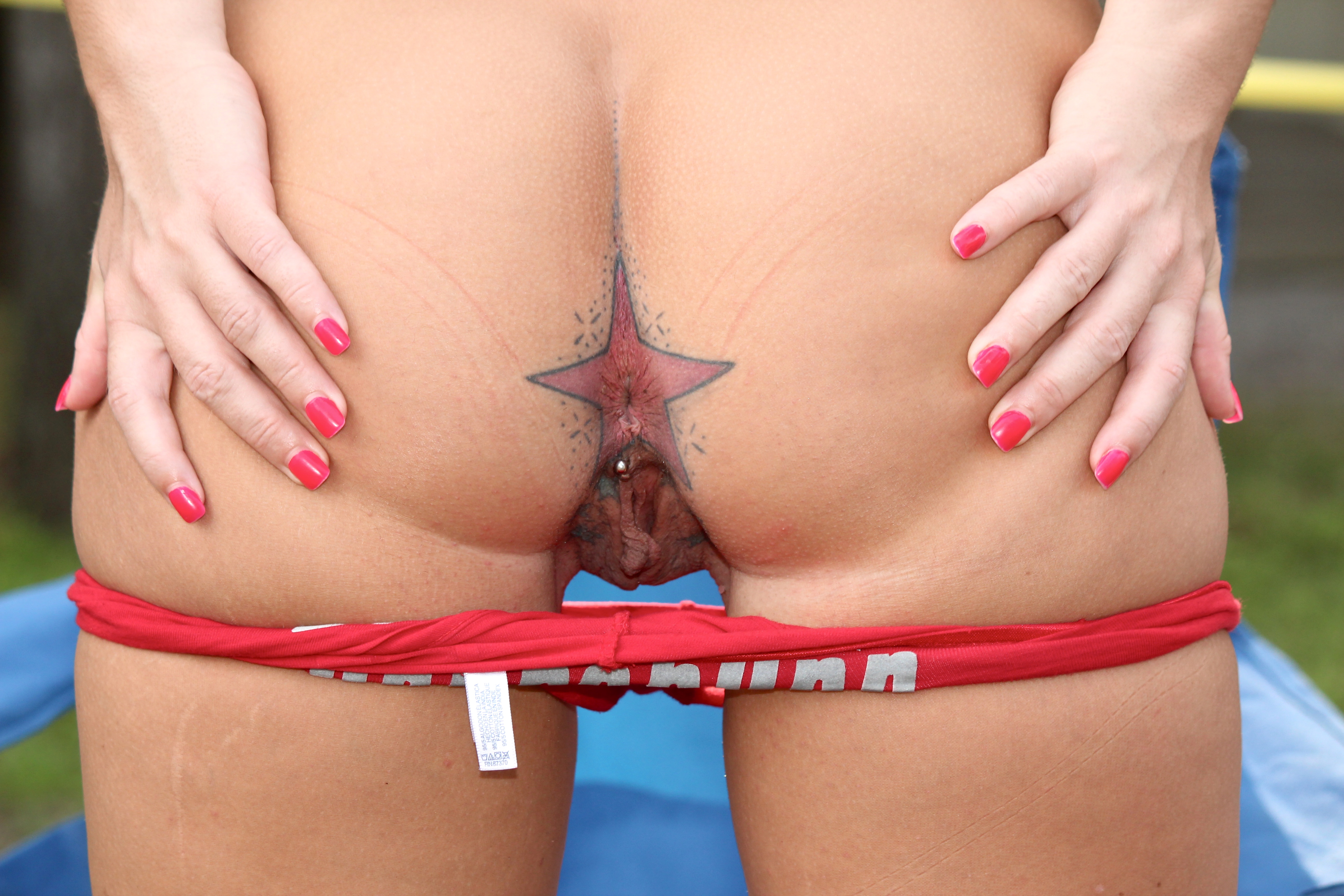
Anus

== See also ==
- Body modification
- Genital jewellery
- Genital piercing
- Vajazzle
- Lower-back tattoo
