= Jennifer Love Hewitt =

American actress and singer (born 1979)

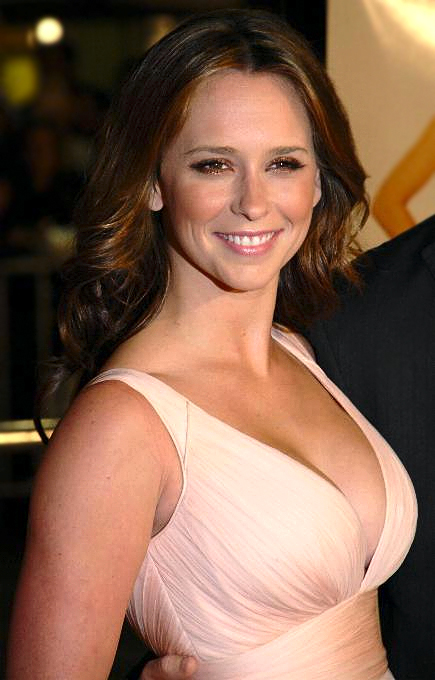
- Hewitt in 2008
- Born: February 21, 1979 (age 47); Waco, Texas, U.S.
- Occupations: Actress; singer; producer; director
- Years active: 1989–present
- Spouse: Brian Hallisay (m. 2013)
- Children: 3
- Musical career
- Genre: Pop
- Instrument: Vocals
- Labels: Atlantic; Jive

Jennifer Love Hewitt (born February 21, 1979) is an American actress, singer, producer and director. Hewitt began her career as a child, appearing in national television commercials before joining the cast of the Disney Channel series Kids Incorporated (1989–1991), which won her a Young Artist Award. After appearing in the film Sister Act 2: Back in the Habit (1993), she had a career breakthrough with the Fox teen drama Party of Five (1995–1999) and became known as a scream queen for her role as Julie James in the horror film I Know What You Did Last Summer (1997) and two of its three sequels.

Hewitt's other films include the comedies Can't Hardly Wait (1998), Heartbreakers (2001), The Tuxedo (2002), and the two Garfield live-action films (2004–2006). On television, she portrayed Melinda Gordon on the CBS supernatural drama Ghost Whisperer (2005–2010), and has starred on the Lifetime drama series The Client List (2012–2013), the CBS crime drama Criminal Minds (2014–2015), and the Fox/ABC first-responder procedural 9-1-1 (2018–present). She was nominated for the Golden Globe Award for Best Actress – Miniseries or Television Film for The Client List pilot film (2010).

In music, Hewitt has released four studio albums: Love Songs (1992), Let's Go Bang (1995), Jennifer Love Hewitt (1996) and BareNaked (2002), the lattermost became a moderate chart success on the Billboard 200. Her most successful single on the Billboard Hot 100 chart was the 1999 release "How Do I Deal", which peaked at number 59. In addition to music and acting, Hewitt has served as a producer on some of her film and television projects. She appeared on the annual Celebrity 100 list by Forbes in 2008 and her dating-advice book The Day I Shot Cupid (2010), topped The New York Times Best Seller list. Labeled a sex symbol, she has appeared in several magazines' lists of the world's most beautiful women.

== Early life ==
Hewitt was born in Waco, Texas, to Patricia Mae (née Shipp), a speech-language pathologist, and Herbert Daniel Hewitt, a medical technician. She grew up in Nolanville in Central Texas, and has close kinship ties in parts of Arkansas. After their parents divorced, Hewitt and her older brother Todd were raised by their mother.

As a toddler, Hewitt was attracted to music, which led to her first encounters with the entertainment industry. At age three, she sang "The Greatest Love of All" at a livestock show. The following year, at a restaurant-dance hall, she entertained an audience with her version of "Help Me Make It Through the Night". By age five, she practiced tap dancing and ballet. At nine, she became a member of the Texas Show Team, an L.A. Gear troupe, which also toured the Soviet Union.

== Acting career ==
=== 1989–1994: Early acting credits ===
Hewitt moved to Los Angeles at age ten to pursue a career in both acting and singing, at the suggestion of talent scouts. After winning the title of "Texas Our Little Miss Talent Winner". She attended Lincoln High School where her classmates included Jonathan Neville, who became a talent scout and recommended Hewitt for her role in Party of Five.

Hewitt appeared in more than twenty television commercials, including some for Mattel toys. Her first break came as a child actress on the Disney Channel variety show Kids Incorporated (1989–1991), which earned her, as a member of the cast, three Young Artist Award nominations. In 1992, she appeared in the live-action short Dance! Workout with Barbie (1992), which was released by Buena Vista, and obtained her first feature film role in the independent production Munchie, in which she played Andrea, the love interest of a bullied young boy. A year later, she had her first starring role in Little Miss Millions, as a wealthy nine-year old who runs away from her stepmother to find her real mother, and appeared as a choir member in Sister Act 2: Back in the Habit. Hewitt played Pierce Brosnan's daughter in a pilot for NBC called Running Wilde (1993), which featured Brosnan as a reporter for Auto World magazine, whose stories cover his own wild auto adventures. The series was not picked up and the pilot never aired. Hewitt later had roles in several short-lived television series, such as Fox's Shaky Ground (1992–1993), ABC's The Byrds of Paradise (1994), and McKenna (1994–95).

=== 1995–1999: Rise to stardom ===
Hewitt rose to teen idol status after landing the role of Sarah Reeves Merrin on the popular Fox show Party of Five (1995–99). Originally cast for a nine-episode arc in season two, reception from producers and audiences was so positive that she became a series regular, continuing to play the character until the show's sixth and final season. Co-creator Amy Lippman once stated: "She was a crazy professional. You didn't have to ask yourself, ‘I don't know if she'll be able to work up a head of steam here, I don't know if she'll be able to cry.' She wasn't running to her trailer [between takes] to smoke cigarettes or play with a toy poodle. She was reading material and trying to plot her career". For her performance, Hewitt garnered nominations for a Kids' Choice Award, a Teen Choice Award and a YoungStar Award.

Hewitt became a film star with the release of the horror film I Know What You Did Last Summer (1997), portraying Julie James, the final girl. She was cast in the role based on her "ability to project vulnerability," which the producers, director Jim Gillespie, and writer Kevin Williamson unanimously agreed upon. While the film received mixed reviews, an Entertainment Weekly columnist praised Hewitt's performance, noting that she knows how to "scream with soul". Budgeted at US $17 million, the movie made US $125 million globally. For her role, she received a Young Artist Award nomination for Best Performance in a Feature Film — Leading Young Actress and the Blockbuster Entertainment Award for Favorite Female Newcomer. She appeared in the sequel I Still Know What You Did Last Summer (1998), which, though not as successful as the first film, took in more money on its opening weekend.

Hewitt starred as Amanda Beckett, the most popular girl in school and the senior class prom queen, in the teen comedy Can't Hardly Wait (1998). Critic James Berardinelli asserted that Hewitt was "so likable that it's hard not to have at least a minor rooting interest" in her character, and with a US $25.6 million gross at the North American domestic box office, the film emerged as a moderate commercial success. Telling You, another 1998 teen comedy, featured Hewitt as the annoyingly sweet ex-girlfriend of a college student working in a pizza joint. In 1999, she played a record company executive in the independent comedy The Suburbans and starred in and produced Time of Your Life, a Party of Five spin-off following her character as she moved to New York City to learn more about her biological parents. Despite Hewitt's popularity at the time, the show received a lackluster viewership and was cancelled after only half the season had aired.

=== 2000–2004: Steady film work ===
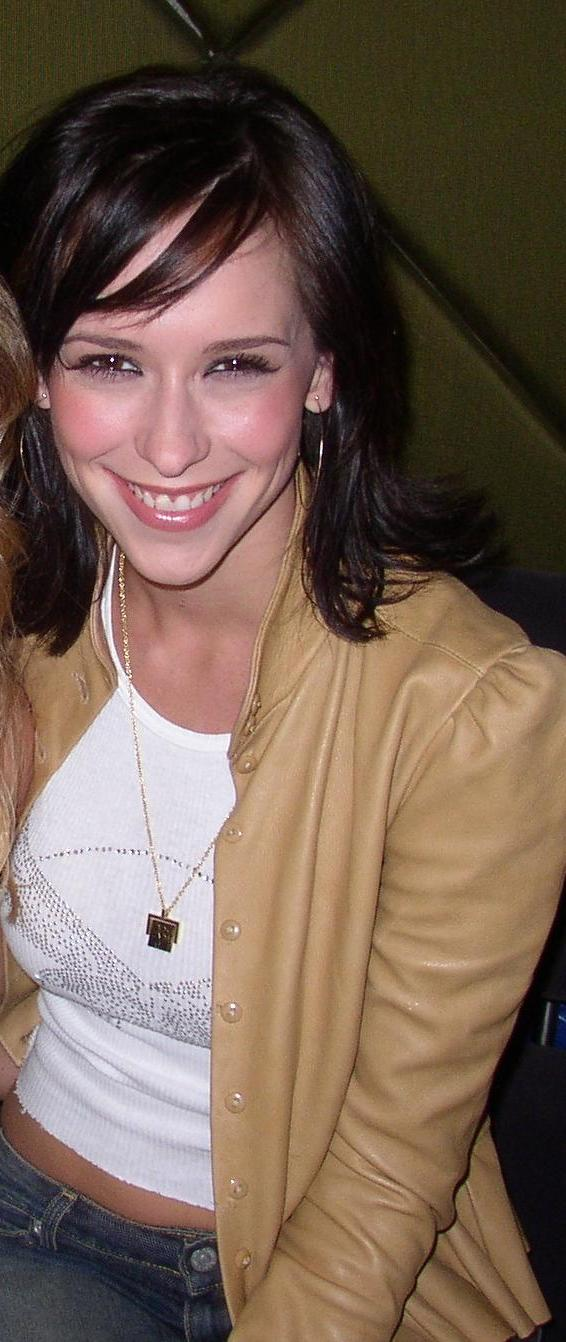
Hewitt in 2002

In The Audrey Hepburn Story (2000), a biographical drama television film based on the life of actress and humanitarian Audrey Hepburn, Hewitt starred as the title role and served as an executive producer. She had been recommended for the role by director Steven Robman, who had previously directed her in Party of Five. The production aired as a three-hour film on ABC on March 27, 2000, and drew mixed reviews. Entertainment Weekly wrote that Hewitt had "guts" to take on the role and called her "excellent at conveying Hepburn's studied modesty", while The Baltimore Sun review stated: "What's impossibly wrong with this film is that Hewitt has no physical grace while Hepburn was the very embodiment of it".

Hewitt starred alongside Sigourney Weaver in the romantic comedy Heartbreakers (2001), playing a mother–daughter team setting up an elaborate con to swindle wealthy men out of their money. Roger Ebert noted that Hewitt "spends the entire film with her treasures on display, maybe as product placement for the Wonderbra", while BBC.com asserted: "Hewitt though, lacks the necessary duplicity for her character and is too patently agreeable to bitch convincingly, ultimately reducing her to eye-candy among the professionals. Still, she has the right cleavage for the role, and there's sure to be legions of men thankful for that alone". The film made a moderate US $57.7 million globally.

Hewitt starred as a genius scientist with aspirations of field work, alongside Jackie Chan, in the action comedy The Tuxedo (2002). Robert Koehler of Variety noted that Hewitt "has displayed a Chan-like sweetness herself in past roles" and was disappointed that her character is "a haggling, high-strung shrew who's instantly repellent" rather than an amusing sidekick as Chan has had in other Hollywood films. The film made US $104.4 million worldwide. In 2002, she also lent her voice for two direct-to-DVD animated films—The Hunchback of Notre Dame II and The Adventures of Tom Thumb and Thumbelina.

In 2004, Hewitt starred as a musician in the romantic fantasy drama If Only, the love interest of Ebenezer Scrooge in the television film A Christmas Carol, and Dr. Liz Wilson in the live-action comedy Garfield. With a worldwide gross of US $200 million, Garfield became Hewitt's highest-grossing film to date.

=== 2005–2010: Return to television ===
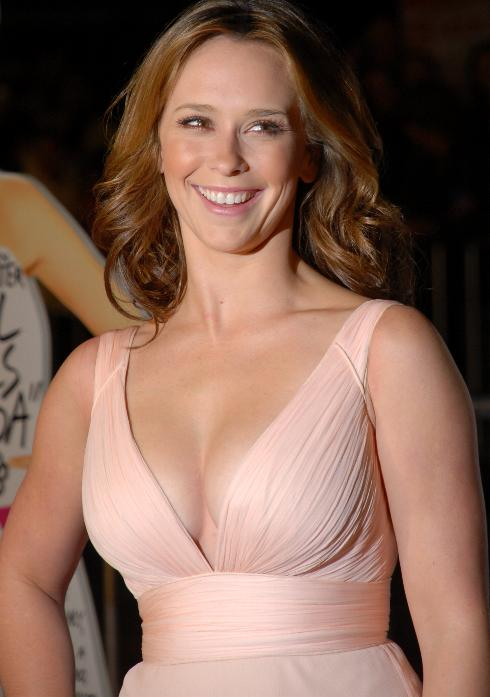
Hewitt in 2008

Hewitt portrayed Melinda Gordon, a woman with the ability to see and communicate with ghosts, on the CBS television series Ghost Whisperer, which ran on CBS for five seasons and 107 episodes, from September 23, 2005, to May 21, 2010. She also served as a producer and directed three episodes, including the 100th episode. In his review for the first season, David Bianculli, of New York Daily News, wrote: "If [television] really wants a success built around this actress, someone in Hollywood should pay attention to her chameleonic and comedic role in Heartbreakers, and give her a role that plays to those strengths, instead of something this translucent". Nevertheless, the series emerged as a ratings success and earned Hewitt two Saturn Awards for Best Television Actress. In 2005, she played a happily married English woman in the romantic comedy The Truth About Love, and a 28-year-old advertising executive more concerned with being a well-known socialite than being a good person in the television film Confessions of a Sociopathic Social Climber.

Hewitt reprised her role as Dr. Liz Wilson for Garfield: A Tail of Two Kitties (2006), which, though it did not perform as well as its predecessor, achieved a strong box office gross. Her next film release was the comedy Shortcut to Happiness, in which she starred as The Devil, opposite Anthony Hopkins and Alec Baldwin. Filmed in New York City in early 2001, the film became an asset in a federal bank fraud trial when investor Jed Barron was convicted of bank fraud while the film was in production. The film was eventually acquired by The Yari Group and was finally released in 2007. In 2008, she made a cameo appearance in the successful action comedy Tropic Thunder, and reunited with Freddie Prinze Jr. in the animated production Delgo, which was a massive box office bomb, taking in US $694,782 in North America.

In 2010, Hewitt portrayed a good-hearted barista in the independent drama Café, and a struggling prostitute in the Lifetime film The Client List. While a reviewer felt that Hewitt did "a surprisingly credible job of acting seen-it-all exasperated and emotionally mature without once going giggly-girly" in Café, Entertainment Weekly's Ken Tucker felt that the actress was able to sell The Client List to the audiences due to her "talent for communicating sincerity and charm". She received a Golden Globe nomination for Best Actress – Miniseries or Television Film for the latter.

=== 2011–present: Continued television roles ===
Hewitt starred as a journalist, opposite Betty White, in the Hallmark Hall of Fame film The Lost Valentine (2011). While reviewers unanimously praised White's performance, Variety wrote: "The same can hardly be said of Hewitt, who—in her current TV movie phase—was put to better use as a mom turned hooker in Lifetime's The Client List. With 14.53 million viewers, the film won its time period and represented the most-watched Hallmark movie in four years.

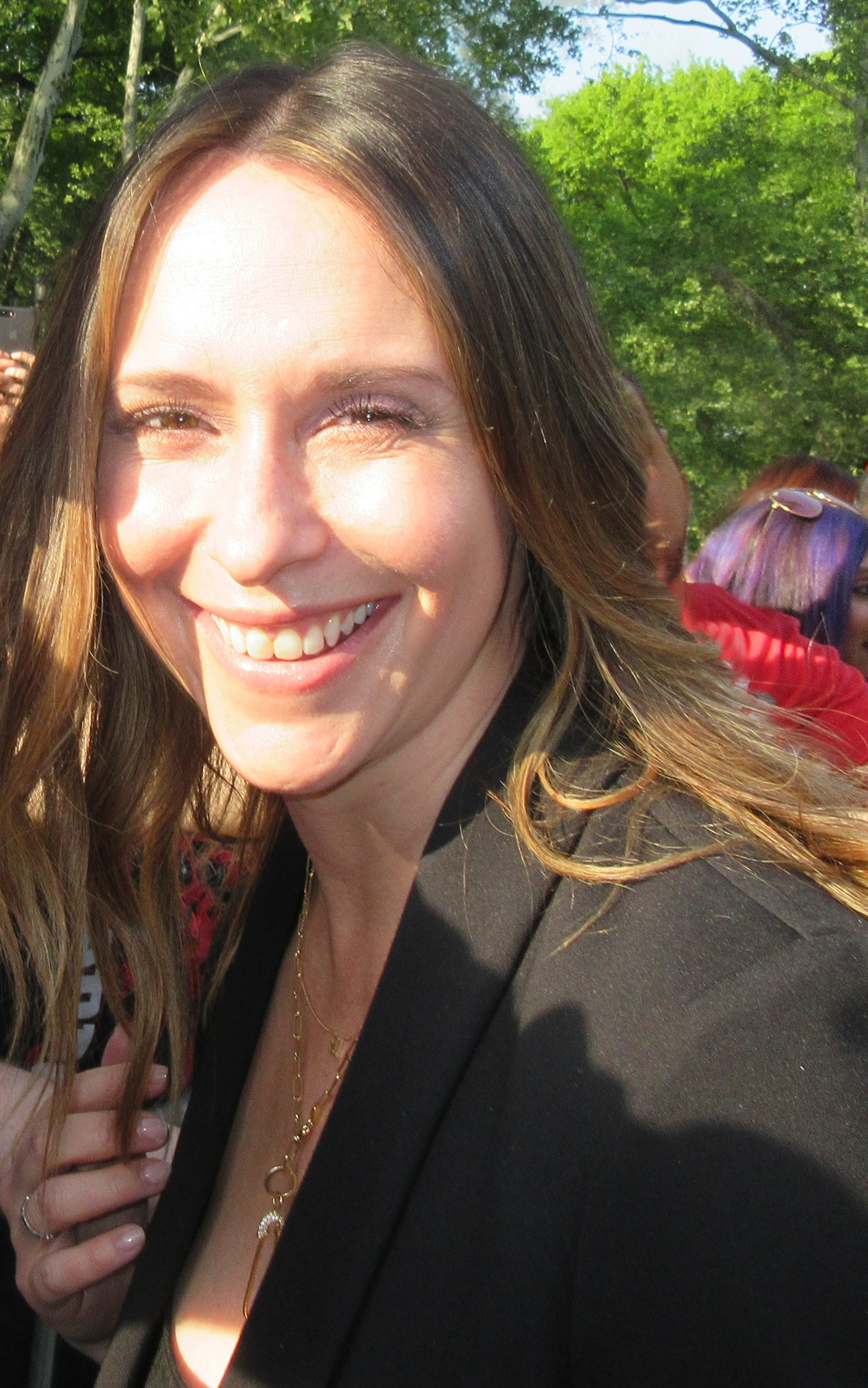
Hewitt in 2018

In 2012, Hewitt starred as the love interest of a gentile pretending to be Jewish, alongside Ivan Sergei and Joel David Moore in the independent comedy Jewtopia, and played an erotic masseuse in the television series The Client List. Based on the 2010 television film of the same name, the series ran for two seasons and featured Hewitt as a different character in a premise that was slightly different from the film.

In 2014 and 2015, Hewitt played the regular role of Kate Callahan, an undercover agent who joins the Behavioral Analysis Unit (BAU), in the tenth season of Criminal Minds. She left the series at the end of the season due to her second pregnancy, and decided to take a career hiatus for the next three years. In an interview with Elle magazine, Hewitt remarked: “I was looking in the mirror, talking with myself, going, ‘Hey, we started something, remember? We were gonna take a step back. So let's do that.'"

Beginning in 2018, Hewitt has played Maddie Buckley, an ER nurse working as a 9-1-1 operator after leaving an abusive relationship, on the Fox police procedural 9-1-1. Describing her character, she stated: "Maddie has a toughness to her. But she's also empathetic and sensitive. People will see her composed on the phone, but fully dealing with the pain and anguish of the callers [once she hangs up]".

== Other ventures ==
=== Music ===
Hewitt was one of the backing vocalists on Martika's number-one single, "Toy Soldiers" (1989). At age 12, Meldac funded the recording of Hewitt's debut studio album, Love Songs (1992). The album was released exclusively in Japan, where Hewitt became a pop star. Her explanation for her success in Japan is that the Japanese "love perky music. The poppier the music, the better." She was subsequently signed to Atlantic Records, who released her next two albums Let's Go Bang (1995) and Jennifer Love Hewitt (1996). The albums, along with their singles, failed to chart and Atlantic dropped Hewitt, who did not return to the music scene for three years.

Hewitt recorded the single "How Do I Deal" (1999) for the I Still Know What You Did Last Summer soundtrack, which became her first charting single, climbing to No. 59 on the Hot 100 and No. 36 on the Top 40 Mainstream. It reached No. 8 in Australia. She also recorded a cover of the Gloria Gaynor song "I Will Survive", which is featured briefly in the film. Hewitt appeared in the LFO video for "Girl on TV" (1999), a song which band member Rich Cronin wrote for her while the two were dating. She also appeared in the music video for the Enrique Iglesias song, "Hero" (2001), as the singer's love interest.

In 2002, Hewitt signed to Jive Records and recorded her fourth studio album, BareNaked, with singer, songwriter, and producer Meredith Brooks. The first single, "BareNaked" (2002), became her biggest radio hit to date when it peaked at No. 24 on the Bubbling Under Hot 100 chart, No. 31 on the Adult Top 40 and No. 25 on the Top 40 Mainstream. It climbed to No. 6 in Australia, remaining there for two weeks, and reached No. 33 in the Netherlands. The song later featured in two episodes of Ghost Whisperer: "The Vanishing" (season 1, episode 20) and "The Collector" (season 2, episode 20). The moderate success of the single propelled the album to peak at No. 37 on the Billboard 200 and No. 31 in Australia. However, it only remained on the chart for three weeks. The second single, "Can I Go Now" (2003), failed to chart in the US, while managing to peak at No. 8 in the Netherlands and No. 12 in Australia.

Since 2004, Hewitt has remained mostly inactive in the music industry, but she released the compilation albums Cool with You: The Platinum Collection (2006). In 2013, she recorded a cover of "I'm a Woman" to promote the second season of The Client List and shot a music video for the song, which reached the top ten in the iTunes Music Video chart.

=== Writing ===
In November 2009, Hewitt made a foray into comic books, when writer Scott Lobdell scripted the five-issue anthology, Jennifer Love Hewitt's Music Box (2009–2010), based on Hewitt's ideas. The series was published by IDW Publishing and was collected in a trade paperback.

She wrote a book titled The Day I Shot Cupid (2010), in which she speaks of her experiences with love and dating. While promoting the book during a January 2010, interview on Lopez Tonight, Hewitt said that there is a chapter in it about "vajazzling" (decorating a woman's pubis with crystals or rhinestones). This became a big internet hit with the video going viral, widespread news coverage and the term "vajazzling" becoming one of the most searched terms on Google the next day. She has since been credited for the popularization of this trend. Helium.com gave the book a positive review, stating: "Jennifer Love Hewitt's book provides some good guidelines for those that need to work on clarifying their relationship desires before trying to establish their relationships". It was commercially successful upon its release, becoming a New York Times bestseller within a week.

== Public image ==
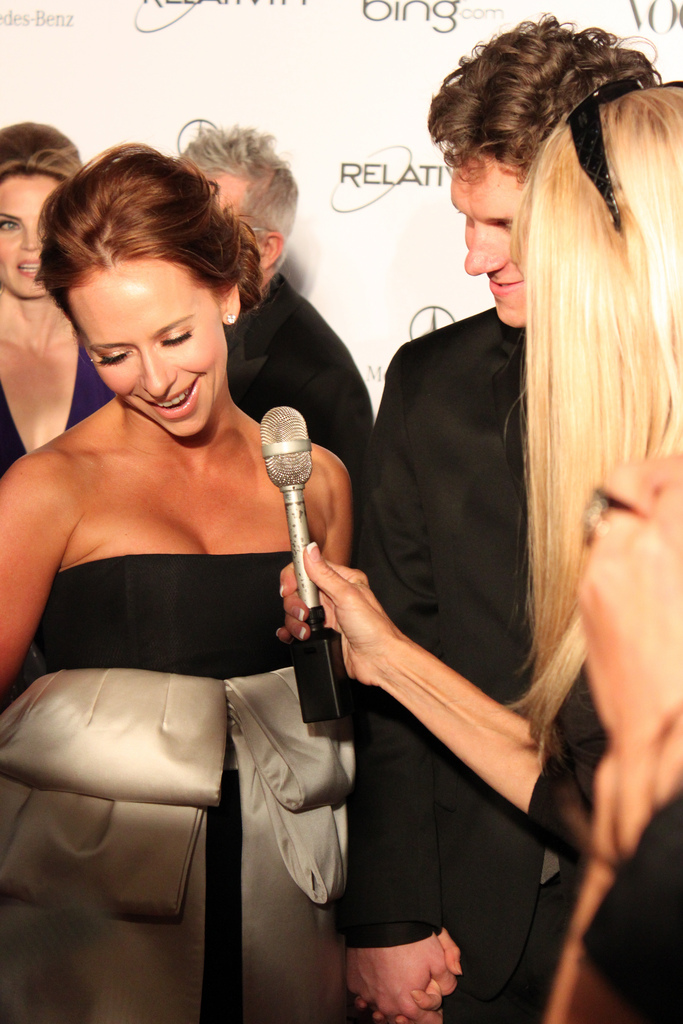
Hewitt in 2011

Regarded as a sex symbol, Hewitt's public "narrative" throughout her career has been that of "the sexy girl next door [or] the MVP of Maxim". As noted by Elle magazine, it was "bequeathed" to her around the time she turned 18 and starred in I Know What You Did Last Summer (1997) and Can't Hardly Wait (1998), roles which, along with Party of Five, "cemented her status as an icon to a whole generation. Every girl wanted to be her, and every boy had a poster of her on his wall". On her public image, she said: "I think when you start [in Hollywood] younger, the narrative takes off without you. And you kind of go, ‘Oh, okay [...] so I'm that person? Great!’ Before I ever knew in my life what 'sexy' was, I was on the sexy list”.

Hewitt has appeared in several magazines' lists of the world's most beautiful women. In 2002, she was voted 7th in FHM's Sexiest Girls poll, 14th in Rush's Sexiest Women list, and 11th in Stuff's "102 Sexiest Women in the World". She has ranked 32nd, 20th, 35th, 20th, 6th, and 35th in Maxim magazine's Hot 100 Women in 2005, 2008, 2010, 2012, 2013 and 2014 respectively. Hewitt was identified as the "number one reader choice" on the November 1999 and May 2009 covers of Maxim. TV Guide named her the sexiest woman on television in 2008.

Hewitt graced the February 1997 cover of Seventeen, and in subsequent years, the list went on to include Rolling Stone, Cosmopolitan, GQ, CosmoGirl, Shape, Health, Maxim, FHM, Vanidades and Jane. Hewitt has appeared in numerous print advertisements and commercials for brands such as Victoria Golf, Mrs. Smith's, Colonial's Iron Kids Bread, Levi's, Barbie, LA Gear, Chex, Proactiv, Hanes, Neutrogena, Nokia, JanSport and America's Dairy Producers. In 2000, Hewitt was named the "most popular actress on television", as her Q Score—the industry's measure of celebrities' likability—was 37, and in 2008, she ranked as 96th on the annual Celebrity 100 list by Forbes magazine, which ranks the most powerful and best-paid celebrities in Hollywood.

== Personal life ==
=== Relationships and family ===
Between the 1990s and the 2000s, Hewitt dated several high-profile figures, including Joey Lawrence, Will Friedle, Carson Daly, Rich Cronin, Patrick Wilson, John Mayer and Jamie Kennedy. In 2005, Hewitt began dating Scottish actor Ross McCall after he made an appearance on Ghost Whisperer. They became engaged in November 2007, while vacationing in Hawaii. People magazine reported that Hewitt called off their engagement in late 2008.

In March 2012, Hewitt started dating her co-star on The Client List, Brian Hallisay. In June 2013, Hewitt announced that she was engaged and expecting her first child with Hallisay. On November 20, 2013, Hewitt and Hallisay married. Their daughter was born a few days later on November 26. In June 2015, the couple had a boy. In August 2021, they had another boy.

=== Stalking incident ===
In 2002, at the Grammy Awards, Diana Napolis, a conspiracy theorist and former social worker, "verbally confronted" Hewitt and attempted to pose as a friend of hers in order to enter the premiere of The Tuxedo; she was then arrested for stalking and uttering death threats against Hewitt and Steven Spielberg. Napolis was charged with six felonies related to the incidents. After almost a year of involuntary commitment and prison, Napolis pleaded guilty and was released on probation with a condition that she was barred from any contact with both Spielberg and Hewitt.

== Filmography ==
=== Film ===
Year	Title	Role	Notes	Ref.
1992	Dance! Workout with Barbie	Workout Dancer	Short film	
1992	Munchie	Andrea Kurtz	Credited as Love Hewitt	
1993	Little Miss Millions	Heather Lofton	Credited as Love Hewitt	
1993	Sister Act 2: Back in the Habit	Margaret	Credited as Jennifer "Love" Hewitt	
1996	House Arrest	Brooke Figler		
1997	Trojan War	Leah Jones		
1997	I Know What You Did Last Summer	Julie James		
1998	Can't Hardly Wait	Amanda Beckett		
1998	Telling You	Deb Freidman		
1998	Zoomates	Helen	Voice role; short film	
1998	I Still Know What You Did Last Summer	Julie James		
1999	The Suburbans	Cate		
2001	Heartbreakers	Page Conners / Jane Helstrom / Wendy		
2002	The Hunchback of Notre Dame II	Madellaine	Voice	
2002	The Adventures of Tom Thumb and Thumbelina	Thumbelina	Voice	
2002	The Tuxedo	Del Blaine		
2004	If Only	Samantha Andrews		
2004	Garfield: The Movie	Liz Wilson		
2005	The Truth About Love	Alice Holbrook		
2006	Garfield: A Tail of Two Kitties	Liz Wilson		
2007	Shortcut to Happiness	The Devil		
2008	Tropic Thunder	Herself		
2008	Delgo	Princess Kyla	Voice	
2011	Café	Claire		
2012	Jewtopia	Alison Marks		
2021	Pups Alone	Gidget	Voice	
2022	Betty White: A Celebration	Herself	Documentary	
2025	I Know What You Did Last Summer	Julie James		

=== Television ===
Year	Title	Role	Notes	Ref.
1989–1991	Kids Incorporated	Robin	Main role (seasons 6 & 7)	
1992	Shaky Ground	Bernadette Moody	Main role	
1994	The Byrds of Paradise	Franny Byrd	Main role	
1994	McKenna	Cassidy McKenna	Main role	
1995–1999	Party of Five	Sarah Reeves Merrin	Main role (seasons 2–6)	
1998	Boy Meets World	Jennifer Love Fefferman	Episode: "And Then There Was Shawn"	
1998	Saturday Night Live	Guest host	Episode: "Jennifer Love Hewitt/Beastie Boys"	
1999	Hercules: The Animated Series	Medusa	Episode: "Hercules and the Gorgon"; voice	
1999	Time of Your Life	Sarah Reeves Merrin	Main role	
2000	The Audrey Hepburn Story	Audrey Hepburn	Television film	
2001	The Weekenders	Herself	Episode: "My Punky Valentine"; voice	
2002	All That	Herself	Episode: "Jeffrey Licon/Jennifer Love Hewitt"	
2002	Family Guy	Herself	Episode: "Stuck Together, Torn Apart"; voice role	
2002	Groove Squad	Chrissy	Voice role, Television film	
2004	American Dreams	Nancy Sinatra	2 episodes	
2004	In the Game	Riley Reed	Unsold pilot	
2004	A Christmas Carol	Emily	Television film	
2005	Confessions of a Sociopathic Social Climber	Katya Livingston	Television film	
2005–2010	Ghost Whisperer	Melinda Gordon	Main role	
2009	Yes, Virginia	Mrs. Laura O'Hanlon	Television film; voice role	
2010	The Client List	Samantha "Sam" Horton	Television film	
2010	Law & Order: Special Victims Unit	Vicki Sayers	Episode: "Behave"	
2011	The Lost Valentine	Susan Allison	Television film	
2011	Love Bites	Herself	Episode: "Firsts"	
2011–2014	Hot in Cleveland	Emmy Chase	3 episodes	
2011	Vietnam in HD	Anne Purcell	Miniseries; voice role	
2012	RuPaul's Drag Race	Guest judge	Episode: "DILFs: Dads I'd Like to Frock"	
2012–2013	The Client List	Riley Parks	Main role	
2014–2015	Criminal Minds	Kate Callahan	Main role (season 10)	
2018–present	9-1-1	Madeleine “Maddie” Buckley-Han	Main role (season 2–present)	
2024	The Holiday Junkie	Andie	Television film; also director	
2025–2026	A Killer Among Friends	Narrator	Documentary, also executive producer	

=== As a director ===
Year	Title	Notes	Ref.
2009–2010	Ghost Whisperer	3 episodes	
2012–2013	The Client List	3 episodes	
2024	The Holiday Junkie	Television film	

=== As a producer ===
Year	Title	Notes	Ref.
1999–2000	Time of Your Life	TV series	
2000	The Audrey Hepburn Story	Television film	
2002	One Night	Short film	
2004	If Only	Theatrical film	
2005–2010	Ghost Whisperer	TV series	
2010	The Client List	Television film	
2011	The Lost Valentine	Television film	
2012	Jewtopia	Theatrical film	
2012–2013	The Client List	TV series	
2025–2026	A Killer Among Friends	Documentary	

== Discography ==
Studio albums

- Love Songs (1992)
- Let's Go Bang (1995)
- Jennifer Love Hewitt (1996)
- BareNaked (2002)

== Books written ==
- Jennifer Love Hewitt's Music Box (2009–2010) (creator)
- The Day I Shot Cupid (2010)
- Inheriting Magic: My Journey Through Grief, Joy, Celebration, and Making Every Day Magical (2024)

== Awards and nominations ==
Year	Award	Category	Work	Result	Ref.
1990	Young Artist Awards	Outstanding Young Ensemble Cast	Kids Incorporated	Nominated	
1993	Young Artist Awards	Outstanding Young Ensemble Cast in a Youth Series or Variety Show	Kids Incorporated	Nominated	
1994	Young Artist Awards	Outstanding Youth Ensemble in a Cable or Off-Primetime Series	Kids Incorporated	Won	
1996	Young Artist Awards	Best Professional Actress/Singer	Herself	Nominated	
1998	Young Artist Awards	Best Performance in a Feature Film — Leading Young Actress	I Know What You Did Last Summer	Nominated	
1998	Blockbuster Entertainment Awards	Favorite Female Newcomer	I Know What You Did Last Summer	Won	
1999	MTV Movie Award	Best Female Performance	Can't Hardly Wait	Nominated	
1999	Blockbuster Entertainment Awards	Favorite Actress — Horror	I Still Know What You Did Last Summer	Won	
1999	Teen Choice Awards	Choice Movie Actress	I Still Know What You Did Last Summer	Won	
1999	Young Artist Awards	Best Performance in a Feature Film — Leading Young Actress	Can't Hardly Wait	Nominated	
2000	Kid's Choice Awards	Favorite Television Actress	Party of Five	Nominated	
2000	People's Choice Awards	Favorite Female Performer in a New Television Series	Time of Your Life	Won	
2003	Kids' Choice Awards	Favorite Female Butt Kicker	The Tuxedo	Won	
2003	DVD Premiere Awards	Best Original Song	The Hunchback of Notre Dame II	Won	
2006	Saturn Awards	Best Actress on Television	Ghost Whisperer	Nominated	
2006	Kids' Choice Awards	Favorite Television Actress	Ghost Whisperer	Nominated	
2006	People's Choice Awards	Favorite Female Television Star	Ghost Whisperer	Nominated	
2007	Saturn Awards	Best Actress on Television	Ghost Whisperer	Won	
2007	Teen Choice Awards	Choice TV Actress: Drama	Ghost Whisperer	Nominated	
2007	People's Choice Awards	Favorite Female Television Star	Ghost Whisperer	Nominated	
2008	People's Choice Awards	Favorite Female Television Star	Ghost Whisperer	Nominated	
2008	Saturn Awards	Best Actress on Television	Ghost Whisperer	Won	
2008	TV Land Awards	Favorite Character from the "Other Side"	Ghost Whisperer	Nominated	
2009	Saturn Awards	Best Actress on Television	Ghost Whisperer	Nominated	
2010	Saturn Awards	Best Actress on Television	Ghost Whisperer	Nominated	
2010	People's Choice Awards	Favorite TV Drama Actress	Ghost Whisperer	Nominated	
2011	Golden Globe Awards	Best Actress in a Mini-Series or Motion Picture Made For Television	The Client List	Nominated	
2024	Astra TV Awards	Best Supporting Actress in a Broadcast Network or Cable Drama Series	9-1-1	Nominated	
2025	Astra TV Awards	Best Supporting Actress in a Drama Series	9-1-1	Nominated	
