= The Day I Shot Cupid =

Dating-advice book

- First edition
- Author: Jennifer Love Hewitt
- Cover artist: Laura Klynstra (design); Catherine Addis (illustration)
- Language: English
- Genre: Relationship Advice
- Publisher: Voice
- Publication date: March 23, 2010
- Publication place: United States
- Media type: Print (Hardcover, Paperback) e-Book (Kindle); Audio Book (CD)
- Pages: 208
- ISBN: 978-1-4013-4112-1

The Day I Shot Cupid: Hello, My Name Is Jennifer Love Hewitt and I'm a Love-aholic (commonly abbreviated to The Day I Shot Cupid) is a bestselling dating-advice book by Jennifer Love Hewitt published March 23, 2010. The book tells of Hewitt's personal dating experiences and gives advice to both men and women on dating life and what to look for in a partner.

== Development ==
Hewitt has often been described as a 'serial dater' in the media and after many publicized relationships, rumors, and break-ups, she revealed that she was planning on writing a relationship book. She has said she wanted to set the record straight on her love-life and talk about the rumors in a personal and honest way. Hewitt said in interviews that the name of the book came to her after she did some research about the god of desire (Cupid) and discovered that in the original myth, after being scorned by love, Cupid didn't shoot people with arrows to make them fall in love, he shot them with poison arrows to make them fall out of love. Hewitt felt that she needed to 'shoot' Cupid to get him to stop.

Throughout writing the book, Hewitt was dating Ghost Whisperer co-star Jamie Kennedy. He wrote a chapter in the book where he writes that men usually prefer women with curves and 'booty', perhaps in relation to Hewitt's much publicized retaliation about the criticism of her weight by the media in 2007. She and Kennedy later broke off their year-long relationship just before she began doing promotional tours and appearances for the book. She joked about this in some promotional interviews, saying "It wasn't ideal timing. Here's my relationship book and I'm single".

In June 2011, Hewitt announced on Twitter that she was in the process of writing another book. Although no specific details were released, she stated that writing was "going well" and that she was excited about the project.

== Cover ==
The cover features an image of a cartoon version of Hewitt kneeling down in a sleek dress. The title art shows a fallen Cupid slumped over his name after being shot in the back with Hewitt's metaphorical arrow. The back cover features a picture of Jennifer, and the front and back flaps feature a brief synopsis of both the book and Hewitt respectively.

== Promotion ==
Hewitt undertook a large promotional campaign leading up to the book's release. She was interviewed by many TV networks and talk-shows in the U.S. During the interviews she stressed that "despite what your pre-conceived notion about what my life is like or what people have written about me, I am just a girl like you."

While promoting the book during a January 2010, interview on Lopez Tonight, Hewitt said that there is a chapter in it about "vajazzling" (decorating a woman's pubis with crystals or rhinestones). She said it looked "cute", revealed that she was currently vajazzled with "hot pink" crystals and recommended to all women that they should also try it and see how it can raise their confidence. This became a big internet hit with the video going viral, widespread news coverage and the term "vajazzling" becoming one of the most searched terms on Google the next day.

== Reception ==
The book has received mixed to positive reviews from critics. Helium.com gave the book a positive review, saying "Jennifer Love Hewitt’s book provides some good guidelines for those that need to work on clarifying their relationship desires before trying to establish their relationships". Talesofwhimsy.com said the book was "charming, honest, zany, and real", adding that "This book is pure fun. I want a copy for my coffee table and single cousin". Crushable.com gave the book a mixed review, mentioning that "Hewitt is a trite and terrible writer - no getting around that - but she makes some good points". The book was commercially successful upon its release, becoming a New York Times bestseller within a week.
