= Jennifer Love Hewitt's Music Box =

Publication information
- Publisher: IDW Publishing
- Format: Paperback; Trade paperback
- Genre: Horror; Thriller; Fantasy
- Publication date: November 1, 2009 – April 1, 2010
- No. of issues: 5

Creative team
- Created by: Jennifer Love Hewitt
- Written by: Scott Lobdell
- Artist(s): Michael Gaydos; Casey Maloney; Adam Archer; George Tuska; Joe Rubenstein

Jennifer Love Hewitt's Music Box (sometimes referred to as The Music Box) is a five-issue comic book series published by IDW Publishing in 2009–2010. It is centered on a music box which causes strange occurrences for the people who possess it.

== Premise ==
Each issue of the series focuses on a different character, all of whom come in contact with a mysterious music box which causes strange occurrences (such as time travel or alternate realities). Each story is tied together through the use of the music box.

== History ==
In July 2009, it was announced that actress Jennifer Love Hewitt was teaming up with IDW to create a comic book series based on her own ideas. Veteran comic book writer Scott Lobdell signed on to script the series, with artists such as Michael Gaydos, Joe Rubenstein, Casey Maloney, Adam Archer and the late George Tuska creating the panels for each issue.

Hewitt released a statement when the series was announced, saying: "The chance to create my very own comic, and a horror/thriller at that, is like a very fun nightmare come true." Lobdell also added his thoughts of working on the series, stating: "Tasked with the responsibility of turning Love’s vision into reality has been a total thrill."

== Release ==
The first issue of Jennifer Love Hewitt's Music Box launched on November 1, 2009, with the final issue becoming available on April 1, 2010. An initial ten-issue run for the series was announced, but it later ended after five issues had been published. The entire anthology is now available in trade paperback.
