= Passion Dust =

Vaginal cosmetics

Passion Dust Intimacy Capsules were a novelty cosmetic product, introduced in 2017, that consisted of capsules full of small, glittering particles, intended to be inserted into the vaginal canal before sex. The product was advertised as making the female genitalia "look, feel and taste soft, sweet and magical". It has been criticised for potentially carrying serious health risks.

Passion Dust was invented by Lola-Butterflie Von-Kerius, an American who sold the product from her home via the Internet under the label Pretty Woman Inc. According to her website, the "passion dust" is made of gelatin, starch-based edible glitter, gum arabic, Corn starch and vegetable sodium stearate.

Following reports of the viral success of Passion Dust in 2017, gynecologists interviewed by news media warned that the use of Passion Dust may carry serious health risks. The starch and gelatin this product contains may encourage the growth of harmful bacteria and fungi, which may cause infections such as bacterial vaginosis or vaginal yeast infection, and inflammation of the vagina. The glitter particles may scratch the vaginal mucosa, allowing infection of the vaginal walls, and they may also migrate up through the cervix to cause similar damage to the lining of the uterus. The website of Pretty Woman Inc. states that the product is harmless.
