= Doves discography =

Band discography

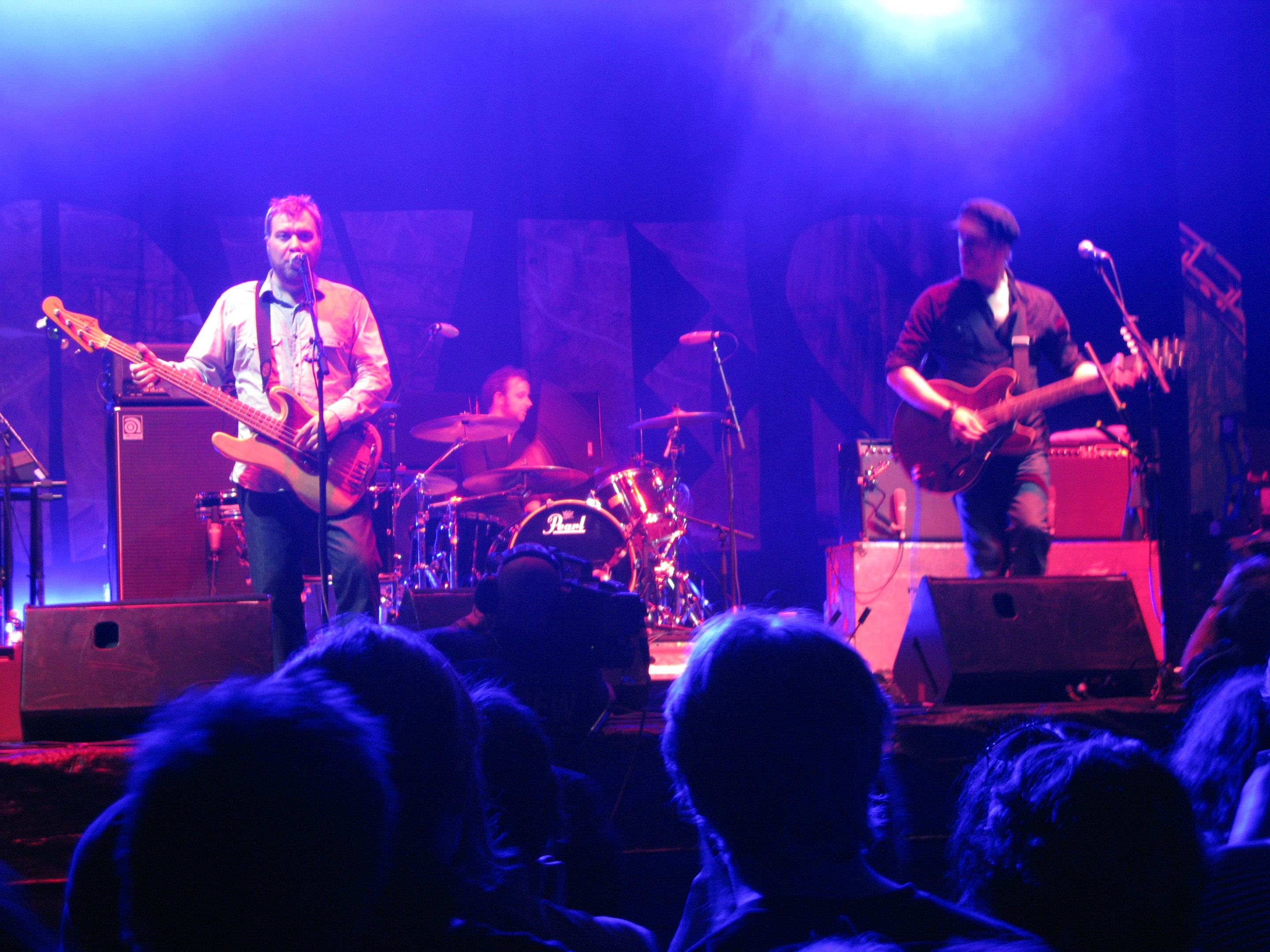
- Doves performing live in 2009
- Studio albums: 6
- Extended plays: 7
- Live albums: 1
- Compilation albums: 5
- Singles: 23
- Music videos: 23

The discography of the English alternative rock trio Doves comprises six studio albums, 23 singles, and seven EPs, as well as two best-of compilation albums, a B-sides compilation, and a full-length DVD compilation. After self-releasing their first three EPs on Casino Records, the band signed to Heavenly Recordings and released their debut album Lost Souls in April 2000. The album reached number 16 on the UK Albums Chart, and has since been certified platinum by the British Phonographic Industry. Their second album The Last Broadcast was even more successful upon its release in April 2002, reaching number 1 on the charts and yielding the band's highest-charting single to date, "There Goes the Fear", which peaked at number 3 on the UK Singles Chart. The album has also been certified platinum by the BPI. In February 2005, Doves released their third studio album Some Cities, which again topped the albums chart at number 1, and produced the hit single "Black and White Town", which charted at number 6, and the minor hit "Snowden", which peaked at number 17.

Following worldwide tours throughout 2005, the band took a break, which saw singer/bassist Jimi Goodwin providing drums on the songs "Mathematics" and "People Help the People" by Bolton-based indie pop band Cherry Ghost, and drummer Andy Williams becoming a father for the first time in September 2007. The band reconvened and began recording throughout 2007 and 2008. Their anticipated fourth album Kingdom of Rust was released in April 2009, peaking at number 2 on the albums chart. The album yielded two singles: "Kingdom of Rust" and "Winter Hill", the latter of which marked the first time a single by the band did not enter the top 100 of the Singles Chart. Worldwide tours coincided with the releases, including an appearance at the BBC Electric Proms festival accompanied by the London Bulgarian Choir in October 2009.

A best–of compilation, entitled The Places Between: The Best of Doves, was released in April 2010 and peaked at number 12 on the albums chart. The single "Andalucia" preceded the album in March 2010.

Following the release of The Places Between, Doves announced they would be taking an indefinite hiatus, during which time Jimi Goodwin released his debut solo album Odludek and the Williams brothers regrouped as Black Rivers and released an eponymous album. Then, in 2019, Doves reunited for a special charity gig, whereupon rumours of the band recording new material began to circulate. On 18 June 2020, the band released their first music in ten years with a song titled "Carousels". Another track, "Prisoners", followed one month later. Simultaneously, the band announced their fifth studio album, The Universal Want, which was released on 11 September 2020, with third single "Cathedrals of the Mind" preceding the album's release on 27 August 2020. The Universal Want became the band's third album to top the UK Albums Chart at number 1. On 4 November 2024, the band released a new single, "Renegade", alongside the announcement of their sixth studio album Constellations for the Lonely, which was released on 28 February 2025. The band's second best-of compilation, entitled So, Here We Are: Best of Doves, was announced on 4 August 2025 to be released on 14 November 2025, alongside a best-of tour of the United Kingdom.

== Studio albums ==
Year	Album details	Peak chart positions										Certifications (sales thresholds)
Year	Album details	UK	AUS	BEL	FRA	GER	IRL	NED	NOR	SCO	US	Certifications (sales thresholds)
2000	Lost Souls: Released: 3 April 2000; Label: Heavenly (HVNLP26); Formats: CD, 2LP, DL	16	68	—	—	—	72	—	—	30	—	BPI: Platinum
2002	The Last Broadcast: Released: 29 April 2002; Label: Heavenly (HVNLP35); Formats: CD, CD/bonus CD (US only), 2LP, DL	1	17	—	94	93	2	—	11	1	83	BPI: Platinum; IRMA: Platinum
2005	Some Cities: Released: 21 February 2005; Label: Heavenly (HVNLP50); Formats: CD, CD/DVD, CD/DVD box, 2LP, DL	1	23	45	149	—	2	62	—	1	111	BPI: Gold; IRMA: Gold
2009	Kingdom of Rust: Released: 6 April 2009; Label: Heavenly (HVNLP67); Formats: CD, 2LP, DL	2	34	68	—	—	8	— (Note: Kingdom of Rust did not enter the Dutch Album Top 100, but entered the Dutch Alternative Top 30 chart at number 27.)	—	2	89	BPI: Gold
2020	The Universal Want: Released: 11 September 2020; Label: Heavenly/Virgin (V3248); Formats: CD, LP, red-coloured LP, white-coloured LP, limited edition box set	1	83	120	—	85	6	—	—	1	— (Note: The Universal Want did not enter the Billboard Top 200, but entered the US Album Sales chart at number 47.)	
2025	Constellations for the Lonely: Released: 28 February 2025; Label: EMI North (EMIN2); Formats: CD, expanded CD edition, LP, various coloured vinyl LPs, cassette	5	—	—	—	—	64	—	—	1	—	
"—" denotes a release that did not chart or was not issued in that region.

== Compilation albums ==
Year	Album details	Peak chart positions			Certifications (sales thresholds)
Year	Album details	UK	IRL	SCO	Certifications (sales thresholds)
2001	Lost Sides: Promo only; not chart eligible; B-sides compilation; 'boxer' artwork; Released: 2 January 2001; Label: Heavenly (HVNLP29); Formats: CD	—	—	—	
2003	Lost Sides: B-sides compilation; 'face' artwork with different track listing; Released: 29 September 2003; Label: Heavenly (HVNLP46); Formats: CD, CD/bonus CD	50	—	48	
2010	The Places Between: The Best of Doves: Released: 5 April 2010; Label: Heavenly (HVNLP78); Formats: CD, 2CD/1DVD, DL	12	57	13	UK: Silver
2012	5 Album Set: Box set compiling the band's first four albums and Lost Sides; Released: 1 October 2012; Label: EMI (5099997354024); Formats: 5CD	—	—	—	
2025	So, Here We Are: Best of Doves: Released: November 2025; Label: EMI North (EMIN003); Formats: CD, limited CD, 2LP, several coloured 2LP exclusives, DL	17	—	4	
"—" denotes a release that did not chart or was not issued in that region.

== Extended plays ==
Year	EP
1998	Cedar: Released: 9 November 1998; Label: Casino (CHIP001); Formats: 10" vinyl
1999	Sea EP: Released: 24 May 1999; Label: Casino (CHIP002); Formats: CD, 10" vinyl
1999	Here It Comes: Released: 2 August 1999; Label: Casino (CHIP003); Formats: CD, 10" vinyl
2005	Live at Eden: US-only release; Released: 26 April 2005; Label: Capitol/EMI (CDP 7243 4 74601 2 8); Formats: CD
2006	Some Cities Live: Download-only release; Released: 17 April 2006; Label: Heavenly; Formats: DL
2020	Remnants I: Download-only release; Released: 17 April 2020; Label: UMC; Formats: DL
2020	Remnants II: Download-only release; Released: 8 May 2020; Label: UMC; Formats: DL

== Singles ==
Song	Release date	Release info	Formats	UK	IRL	MEX	SCO	US Sales	US Dance	Album
"Sea Song"	24 May 1999	Casino (CHIP002)	CD, 10" vinyl	80	—	—	100	—	—	Sea EP
"Here It Comes"	2 August 1999	Casino (CHIP003)	CD, 10" vinyl	73	—	—	74	—	—	Here It Comes EP
"The Cedar Room"	20 March 2000	Heavenly (HVN95)	CD, 10" vinyl	33	—	—	37	—	—	Lost Souls
"Catch the Sun"	29 May 2000	Heavenly (HVN96)	CD1, CD2, 10" vinyl	32	—	—	33	—	—	Lost Souls
"The Man Who Told Everything"	30 October 2000	Heavenly (HVN98)	CD1, CD2, 7" vinyl	32	—	—	33	—	—	Lost Souls
"There Goes the Fear"	15 April 2002	Heavenly (HVN111)	CD, 10" vinyl	3	27	—	2	—	—	The Last Broadcast
"Pounding"	22 July 2002	Heavenly (HVN116)	CD, DVD, 10" vinyl	21	—	—	20	—	—	The Last Broadcast
"Caught by the River"	14 October 2002	Heavenly (HVN126)	eCD, CD, 10" vinyl	29	—	—	29	—	—	The Last Broadcast
"Black and White Town"	7 February 2005	Heavenly (HVN145)	CD1, CD2, 7" vinyl	6	11	—	6	—	—	Some Cities
"Snowden"	9 May 2005	Heavenly (HVN150)	CD1, CD2, 7" vinyl	17	42	—	—	—	—	Some Cities
"Sky Starts Falling"	12 September 2005	Heavenly (HVN152)	CD, DVD, 7" vinyl	45	—	—	41	—	—	Some Cities
"Kingdom of Rust"	30 March 2009	Heavenly (HVN189)	CD, 7" vinyl, 3 x 12" vinyl	28	—	26	3	2	—	Kingdom of Rust
"Winter Hill"	20 July 2009	Heavenly (HVN192)	7" vinyl, 3 x 12" vinyl	148	—	—	30	6	1	Kingdom of Rust
"Andalucia"	5 April 2010	Heavenly (HVN201)	DL	—	—	—	—	—	—	The Places Between: The Best of Doves
"Carousels"	18 June 2020	Virgin/EMI/Heavenly	DL, streaming	— (Note: "Carousels" did not enter the UK Singles Chart, but peaked at number 96 on the UK Singles Sales Chart.)	—	—	82	—	—	The Universal Want
"Prisoners"	9 July 2020	Virgin/EMI/Heavenly	DL, streaming	—	—	—	—	—	—	The Universal Want
"Cathedrals of the Mind"	27 August 2020	Virgin/EMI/Heavenly	DL, streaming	—	—	—	—	—	—	The Universal Want
"Renegade"	4 November 2024	EMI North	DL, streaming	— (Note: "Renegade" did not enter the UK Singles Chart, but peaked at number 96 on the UK Singles Downloads Chart.)	—	—	—	—	—	Constellations for the Lonely
"Cold Dreaming"	8 January 2025	EMI North	DL, streaming	—	—	—	—	—	—	Constellations for the Lonely
"Saint Teresa"	10 February 2025	EMI North	DL, streaming	—	—	—	—	—	—	Constellations for the Lonely
"A Drop in the Ocean"	26 February 2025	EMI North	DL, streaming	—	—	—	—	—	—	Constellations for the Lonely
"Cally" / "Lean into the Wind"	12 April 2025	EMI North	10" vinyl, DL, streaming	—	—	—	—	—	—	Constellations for the Lonely
"Spirit of Your Friend"	6 October 2025	EMI North	DL, streaming	—	—	—	—	—	—	So, Here We Are: Best of Doves
"—" denotes a release that did not chart.

== Promo-only singles and special releases ==
Title	Release date	Release info	Formats	Album
"Spaceface" (Live)	19 May 2003	Heavenly (HVN122)	Promo CD^{[A]}	Where We're Calling From DVD
"Black Circus of Prague" / "Black and White Town" (David Holmes Remix)	4 April 2005	Heavenly (HVN150P)	Promo 7"^{[B]}	"Snowden" single
Instrumentals of Rust	15 June 2009	Heavenly	DL^{[C]}	Kingdom of Rust
"House of Mirrors"	7 December 2009	Heavenly (HVN195)	Promo CD-R^{[D]}	Kingdom of Rust
"Brazil" (Aeroplane Remix)	7 December 2009	Heavenly	Promo CD-R^{[E]}	Non-album track

Notes

- A "Spaceface" (Live at the Eden Sessions) was issued as a promo-only CD prior to the release of Where We're Calling From and was not given a commercial release.
- B "Black Circus of Prague" and "Black and White Town" (David Holmes Remix) were issued on a limited edition promo-only 7" single prior to the release of the "Snowden" single.
- C Instrumental versions of all 11 tracks on Kingdom of Rust; released exclusively as a digital download.
- D "House of Mirrors" was canceled as the album's third single.
- E Aeroplane's remix of "Brazil" was rumoured to be the B-side of the "House of Mirrors" single.

== Live albums ==
Doves performed live at The Eden Sessions on 2 July 2010. The set was recorded and burned to CD-R, and made available for sale on Doves' official website as a digital download or limited edition 2CD-R set shortly thereafter.

Live at The Eden Sessions 2 July 2010

Disc one
No.	Title	Length
1.	"Push Me On"	4:32
2.	"Snowden"	4:07
3.	"Pounding"	4:34
4.	"Jetstream"	5:41
5.	"Winter Hill"	5:25
6.	"Where We're Calling From"	1:51
7.	"House of Mirrors"	4:00
8.	"Words"	5:06
9.	"10:03"	4:40
10.	"The Greatest Denier"	4:01

Disc two
No.	Title	Length
11.	"Kingdom of Rust"	5:21
12.	"Black and White Town"	4:22
13.	"Caught by the River"	6:06
14.	"The Cedar Room"	10:23
15.	"Firesuite"	5:05
16.	"Catch the Sun"	4:50
17.	"There Goes the Fear"	6:11
18.	"Spaceface"	5:39

== DVDs ==
- "Pounding" (22 July 2002) - DVD single
- Where We're Calling From (29 September 2003) - full length DVD
- Some Cities (21 February 2005) (special edition version of album with extra video documentary) - DVD
- "Sky Starts Falling" (12 September 2005) - DVD single
- Kingdom of Rust (6 April 2009) (video documentary on the making of the album; also includes "House of Mirrors" music video) - exclusive to NME.com
- The Places Between: The Best of Doves (5 April 2010) (deluxe edition includes a bonus DVD featuring all 13 of the band's music videos from 1998 to 2009)

== Music videos ==
Year	Video	Director
1998	"The Cedar Room"	Matthew Norman
1999	"Sea Song"	Rick Myers
1999	"Here It Comes"	Rick Myers, Julian Cooper, Rich Mulhearn, and Mat Burhouse
2000	"Catch the Sun"	Sophie Muller
2000	"The Man Who Told Everything"	Sam Brown
2002	"There Goes the Fear"	Julian House and Julian Gibbs at Intro
2002	"Pounding"	Julian House and Julian Gibbs at Intro
2002	"Caught by the River"	David Mould
2005	"Black and White Town"	Lynne Ramsay
2005	"Snowden"	Dominic Leung
2005	"Sky Starts Falling"	Reuben Sutherland at Joyrider Films
2009	"House of Mirrors"	Soup Collective
2009	"Kingdom of Rust"	China Moo-Young at Warp Films
2009	"Winter Hill"	David Mould at Pulse Films
2010	"Andalucia"	Soup Collective and Percy Dean
2020	"Carousels"	Yoni Weisberg
2020	"Prisoners"	BWTV
2020	"Cathedrals of the Mind"	David Kitson
2020	"Broken Eyes"	Colin Read
2024	"Renegade"	Hingston Studio
2025	"Cold Dreaming"	Hingston Studio
2025	"A Drop in the Ocean"	Hingston Studio
2025	"Spirit of Your Friend"	Dominic Foster

== B-sides ==
=== Lost Souls B-sides ===
- "Zither"
- "Break Me Gently" (Incidental)
- "Darker"
- "Meet Me at the Pier"
- "Acoustic No.1"
- "Karen"
- "Valley"
- "Down to Sea" (demo of "Sea Song")
- "Crunch"
- "Lost in Watts"
- "Rise" (Live Triple J at The Wireless)
- "Suitenoise"
- "Your Shadow Lay Across My Life"
- "Firesuite" (Noise Version)

=== The Last Broadcast B-sides ===
- "Hit the Ground Running"
- "Here It Comes" (Live Triple J at The Wireless)
- "The Cedar Room" (Live Triple J at The Wireless)
- "Far from Grace"
- "Northenden"
- "Willow's Song" (edit)
- "Willow's Song" (full length version)
- "M62 Song" (Four Tet Remix)
- "Satellites" (Soulsavers Remix)
- "The Sulphur Man" (Rebelski Remix)
- "Where We're Calling From" (Kieran Hebden Bridge Remix)

=== Some Cities B-sides ===
- "45"
- "At the Tower"
- "Eleven Miles Out"
- "Black Circus of Prague"
- "Son of a Builder"
- "Black and White Town" (David Holmes Remix)
- "Almost Forgot Myself" (Doves vs. 69Corp Mix)
- "Some Cities" (Echoboy Remix)
- "The Storm" (Rebelski Remix)
- "Some Cities" (Love Will Never Sever Mix by Echoboy)

=== Kingdom of Rust B-sides ===
- "Push Me On"
- "Ship of Fools"
- "The Last Son"
- "Brazil"
- "Kingdom of Rust" (Acoustic)
- "Winter Hill" (Acoustic)
- "Jetstream" (Acoustic)
- "Birds Flew Backwards" (Alternative Version)
- "Birds Flew Backwards" (Chris Watson Version)

Remixes

- "Kingdom of Rust" (Prins Thomas Diskomiks)
- "Kingdom of Rust" (Prins Thomas Diskomiks Instrumental)
- "Kingdom of Rust" (Still Going Remix)
- "Kingdom of Rust" (Still Going Instrumental)
- "Push Me On" (Playgroup Megamix Edit)
- "Push Me On" (Playgroup Megamix)
- "Push Me On" (Playgroup Megadub)
- "Push Me On" (The Glimmers Remix)
- "Jetstream" (Sasha Remix)
- "Jetstream" (Sasha Subdub)
- "Jetstream" (Lindstrøm Remix)
- "Jetstream" (The Time & Space Machine Remix)
- "Compulsion" (Andrew Weatherall Remix)
- "Brazil" (Aeroplane Remix)

== Songs on various artists compilations ==
- "Blackbird" (The Beatles cover) - from Roswell - Original Television Soundtrack (2002), for the US TV series.
- "Willow's Song" - from The Acoustic Album (2006, Virgin Records).
- "There Goes the Fear" (live from Glastonbury 2003) - from the "Q Live from Glastonbury" 14-track compilation, a free give-away CD with the July 2007 edition of Q magazine.
- "There Goes the Fear" - from (500) Days of Summer original motion picture soundtrack (2009).

== Sub Sub discography ==
=== Albums ===
- Full Fathom Five (Rob's Records, ROB 30, 5 September 1994)
- Delta Tapes (Compilation; Cortex Records, 23 February 1998)

=== Singles & EPs ===
- "Space Face" (Ten Records, January 1992)
- Coast EP (Rob's Records, ROB 7; June 1992)
- "Ain't No Love (Ain't No Use)" (featuring Melanie Williams) (Rob's Records, ROB 9; 29 March 1993)
- "Respect" (featuring Nina Henchion) (Rob's Records, ROB 19; 7 February 1994)
- "Angel" (featuring Nina Henchion) (Rob's Records, ROB 29; 15 August 1994)
- "Southern Trees" (featuring Gill Jackson) (Rob's Records, ROB 39; 23 January 1995)
- "Smoking Beagles" (featuring Tricky) (Rob's Records, ROB 51; 16 December 1996)
- "This Time I'm Not Wrong" (featuring Bernard Sumner) (Rob's Records, ROB 53; 25 August 1997)

== Solo releases ==
=== Jimi Goodwin ===
- Odludek (Heavenly, 24 March 2014)

=== Black Rivers (Jez and Andy Williams) ===
- Black Rivers (Ignition Records, 9 February 2015)

=== Martin Rebelski ===
- Thanks for Your Thoughts (Heavenly, 3 March 2003)
- Stickers on Keys (Heavenly, 29 November 2004)
