= The Places Between: The Best of Doves =

Greatest hits album by Doves
- Released: 5 April 2010
- Recorded: 1996–2010
- Genre: Indie rock
- Length: CD1: 1:19:17; CD2: 1:16:43; Total: 2:35:52
- Label: Heavenly
- Producers: Doves; Dan Austin; Martin "Max" Heyes; Ben Hillier; John Leckie; Steve Osborne

Doves chronology
Kingdom of Rust (2009)	The Places Between: The Best of Doves (2010)	The Universal Want (2020)

Doves compilation album chronology
Lost Sides (2003)	The Places Between: The Best of Doves (2010)	So, Here We Are: Best of Doves (2025)

Singles from The Places Between: The Best of Doves
- 1. "Andalucia" Released: 1 March 2010

The Places Between: The Best of Doves is a compilation album from the British indie rock band Doves. The compilation was released on 5 April 2010 in the UK via Heavenly Recordings, and on 20 April 2010 in North America via Astralwerks. The album encompasses the band's entire career, collecting from their 2000 debut album Lost Souls, 2002's The Last Broadcast, 2005's Some Cities, and their 2009 album Kingdom of Rust, as well as an assortment of EPs and singles. The compilation was released as a standard single-disc best-of, as well as a deluxe three-disc edition, featuring the best-of album along with a bonus disc of B-sides, rarities, alternate versions, and album cuts, plus a bonus DVD collecting all of the band's music videos from 1998 through 2009. It peaked at #12 on the UK Albums Chart.

The best-of was preceded by the single "Andalucia", released to radio stations on 1 March 2010, then as a digital download-only single on 5 April 2010.

== Conception ==
In an interview with Spinner.com, Jimi Goodwin stated that the band was "very involved" in selecting tracks to comprise the track listings, stating that, "Hopefully, it stands up to things like Songs to Learn & Sing by Echo & the Bunnymen, because I look at those as albums in their own right; you forget that they're compilations." Jez Williams stated in an interview with musicOMH that track selection was refreshing: "When you finish an album quite often you get out of the studio and just want to get away from it. I thought that it was interesting listening to this, because normally when we finish an album you wouldn't hear it again. It was great hearing the B-sides too. We feel we've written some pretty strong B-sides, but you get that thing where we're described as anthemic a lot, which is great, but I think the B-sides reveal a few other sides to us. It shows a lot more than what we're known for." Goodwin also told The Daily Record that the compilation is "wiping the slate clean – we have nothing else in the vaults now. That is it. Whatever we do from now on will be a new start."

The band's recording hiatus lasted for over ten years, until they released their fifth studio album The Universal Want in September 2020. In the interim, Goodwin released a solo album entitled Odludek in 2014, while Jez and Andy Williams regrouped as Black Rivers and released an eponymously titled album in 2015.

== Critical reception ==
Professional ratings
Review scores
Source	Rating
AllMusic	3.5/5 stars
BBC	very positive
Clash	9/10
Drowned in Sound	5/10
The Fly	3.5/5 stars
IndieLondon	5/5 stars
musicOMH	4/5 stars
Pitchfork	7.8/10
PopMatters	8/10
Q	4/5 stars

The Places Between was met with very positive reviews. PopMatters awarded the compilation an 8 out of 10 rating, noting that, "When it comes to the singles they've put out... the consistency has been remarkable, with not a dud in the lot, the band putting out some of the most finely crafted rock songs to come out of the UK of late." Clash awarded the album a 9 out of 10 and called the collection "a beguiling celebration of truly excellent music." IndieLondon gave the album 5 out of 5 stars, calling the album "a best-of collection to savour," and the BBC hailed The Places Between as "a collection of monumental music to truly cherish."

== Track listing ==
All tracks are written by Jez Williams, Jimi Goodwin, and Andy Williams.

Disc one: The Best of Doves
No.	Title	Producer	Length
1.	"There Goes the Fear"	Doves	6:55
2.	"Black and White Town"	Doves, Ben Hillier	4:15
3.	"Snowden" (Rich Costey Mix)	Doves, Ben Hillier	4:10
4.	"Here It Comes"	Doves	4:53
5.	"Words"	Doves	5:44
6.	"Kingdom of Rust"	Doves, Dan Austin	5:11
7.	"Sea Song"	Doves	5:17^{[A]}
8.	"Pounding"	Doves	4:45
9.	"10:03"	John Leckie, Doves	4:04
10.	"Catch the Sun"	Doves, Steve Osborne	4:48
11.	"Jetstream"	Doves, Dan Austin	5:31
12.	"The Man Who Told Everything" (Summer Version)	Doves	5:41
13.	"Andalucia"	Doves, Dan Austin	4:21
14.	"Caught by the River"	Doves, Steve Osborne	5:55
15.	"The Cedar Room"	Doves	7:39

== Bonus disc track listing ==
All tracks are written by Jez Williams, Jimi Goodwin, and Andy Williams, except where noted.

Disc two: Rarities, B-sides, and Alternate Versions
No.	Title	Writer(s)	Producer	Length
1.	"Blue Water"		Doves	4:31
2.	"Eleven Miles Out"		Doves, Ben Hillier	4:27
3.	"Rise"		Doves	5:17^{[B]}
4.	"Darker"		Doves	5:50
5.	"Push Me On"		John Leckie, Doves	3:54
6.	"Willow's Song" (Bury Version)	Traditional; arranged by Doves	Doves	3:53
7.	"Valley"		Doves	4:24
8.	"Northenden"		Doves	3:53
9.	"M62 Song"	Williams, Goodwin, Williams, Fripp, Giles, Lake, McDonald, Sinfield	Doves	3:42
10.	"The Drifter" (featuring Simon Aldred)		Doves, Dan Austin	3:59
11.	"Friday's Dust" (Capitol Tower Session)		Doves	3:23
12.	"Almost Forgot Myself" (Demo)		Doves	4:40
13.	"Your Shadow Lay Across My Life"		Doves	3:46
14.	"The Last Son"		Doves, Dan Austin	4:38
15.	"The Sulphur Man"		Doves	4:37
16.	"At the Tower" (Instrumental Edit)	Williams, Goodwin, Williams, Hazlewood	Doves, Ben Hillier	3:50
17.	"Reprise"		Doves	1:52
18.	"Ambition"		Doves, Ben Hillier	3:43^{[C]}
19.	"Firesuite" (Noise Version)		Doves	2:22^{[D]}

iTunes-only bonus track
No.	Title	Producer	Length
20.	"Brazil"	Doves, Dan Austin	3:36

== DVD track listing ==
Disc three: The Music Videos
No.	Title	Director	Length
1.	"The Cedar Room"	Matthew Norman	4:48
2.	"Sea Song"	Rick Myers	4:36
3.	"Here It Comes"	Rick Myers, Julian Cooper, Rich Mulhearn, and Mat Burhouse	4:54
4.	"Catch the Sun"	Sophie Muller	4:19
5.	"The Man Who Told Everything"	Sam Brown	4:39
6.	"There Goes the Fear"	Julian House and Julian Gibbs	4:57
7.	"Pounding"	Julian House and Julian Gibbs	4:19
8.	"Caught by the River"	David Mould	4:33
9.	"Black and White Town" (Director's Cut)	Lynne Ramsay	4:21
10.	"Snowden" (Live Edit)	Dominic Leung	4:12
11.	"Sky Starts Falling"	Reuben Sutherland	4:00
12.	"Kingdom of Rust"	China Moo-Young	4:29
13.	"Winter Hill"	David Mould	3:49
Total length:			57:00 (approximately)

- The DVD also features the videos for "There Goes the Fear", "Pounding" and "Caught by the River" in 5.1 Surround Sound.

== Release history ==
Country	Date	Label	Format	Catalogue #
United Kingdom	5 April 2010	Heavenly Recordings/Virgin Records	CD	HVNLP78CD
United Kingdom	5 April 2010	Heavenly Recordings/Virgin Records	2CD/1DVD	HVNLP78CDX
United States	20 April 2010	Heavenly/Virgin (distributed by Astralwerks)	2CD/1DVD	HVNLP78CDX (5099962801423)

== Charts ==
Chart (2010)	Peak position
UK Albums Chart	12
Scottish Albums Chart	13
Irish Albums Chart	57

== Certifications ==
Certifications and sales for The Places Between: The Best of Doves
Region	Certification	Certified units/sales
United Kingdom (BPI)	Silver	60,000^{‡}
^{‡} Sales+streaming figures based on certification alone.

== Notes ==
Disc one:

- Tracks 4, 7, 10, and 15 taken from Lost Souls (April 2000)
  - Original version of track 12 taken from Lost Souls; Summer Version taken from the single "The Man Who Told Everything" (October 2000)
- Tracks 1, 5, 8, and 14 taken from The Last Broadcast (April 2002)
- Track 2 taken from Some Cities (February 2005)
  - Original version of track 3 taken from Some Cities; Rich Costey Mix taken from the single "Snowden" (May 2005)
- Tracks 6, 9, and 11 taken from Kingdom of Rust (April 2009)
- Track 13: previously unreleased

Disc two:

- Tracks 1, 6, 10, 11, 12, and 16: previously unreleased
- Track 2 and the original version of track 16 taken from the single "Black and White Town" (February 2005)
- Tracks 3 and 17 taken from Lost Souls (April 2000)
- Track 4 taken from the Sea EP (May 1999)
- Track 5 taken from the single "Kingdom of Rust" (March 2009)
- Track 7 taken from the single "Catch the Sun" (May 2000)
- Track 8 taken from the single "Pounding" (July 2002)
- Tracks 9 and 15 taken from The Last Broadcast (April 2002)
- Tracks 13 and 19 taken from the single "The Man Who Told Everything" (October 2000)
- Track 14 taken from the UK iTunes-only release of Kingdom of Rust (April 2009)
- Track 18 taken from Some Cities (February 2005)

Run time notes:

- A Though not listed as an edit on the track listing, the full-length album version of "Sea Song" runs 6:12
- B The full-length album version of "Rise" runs 5:38
- C This version omits the ambient noise found at the end of the album version
- D The full-length Noise Version of "Firesuite" runs 3:09

== Credits ==
Musicians

All instruments by Doves, except:

- "There Goes the Fear"
  - Percussion by Marc Starr, Chris Davies, Billy Booth, and Richard Sliwa.
- "Black and White Town", "Here It Comes", "10:03" and "Blue Water"
  - Piano by Martin Rebelski.
- "Snowden"
  - Glockenspiel by Ben Hillier.
  - Backing vocals by Guy Garvey.
  - Strings by Millennia Strings.
  - String arrangements by Ian Burdge.
- "Words"
  - Keyboards and glockenspiel by Martin Rebelski.
  - Violin by Rosie Lowdell.
  - Megaphone by Brian Madden.
- "Kingdom of Rust"
  - Piano by Martin Rebelski.
  - Violins by Belinda Hammond and Oliver Morris.
  - Viola by Alexandra Fletcher.
  - Cello by Elinor Gow.
- "The Man Who Told Everything"
  - Strings by Kate Evans, Jane Coyle, Barbara Grunthal, and Wendy Edison.
- "Andalucia"
  - Violin by Belinda Hammond.
- "Rise"
  - Harmonica by Stuart Warburton.
- "Valley" and "Your Shadow Lay Across My Life"
  - Keyboards by Martin Rebelski.
- "The Drifter"
  - Backing vocals by Simon Aldred.
- "Almost Forgot Myself"
  - Backing vocals by Guy Garvey.
- "At the Tower"
  - Keyboards and percussion by Ben Hillier.
- "The Sulphur Man"
  - Keyboards and glockenspiel by Martin Rebelski.
  - Violins by Rosie Lowdell, Jackie Norrie, Sally Herbert, and Brian Wright.
  - Viola by Brian Wright.
  - Cello by Marcus Holdaway.
  - Trombone by Andy Robinson and Marc Bassey.
  - Trumpet and flugelhorn by Steve Waterman.
  - Flute and tenor saxophone by Colin Crawley.
  - Orchestral arrangement by Sean O'Hagan.

Production

- "There Goes the Fear", "Words", "Pounding", "M62 Song" and "The Sulphur Man" produced by Doves; additional production by Max Heyes. Mixed by Doves and Max Heyes.
- "Black and White Town", "Eleven Miles Out", "At the Tower", "Ambition" and "Sky Starts Falling" produced and mixed by Doves and Ben Hillier.
- "Snowden" produced by Doves and Ben Hillier. Mixed by Rich Costey.
- "Here It Comes", "Sea Song", "The Cedar Room", "Rise", "Darker", "Willow's Song", "Valley", "Northenden", "Almost Forgot Myself", "Reprise" and "Firesuite" produced and mixed by Doves.
- "Kingdom of Rust" and "Jetstream" produced by Doves and Dan Austin. Mixed by Michael H. Brauer.
- "10:03" produced by Doves and John Leckie. Mixed by Dan Austin.
- "Catch the Sun" and "Caught by the River" produced by Doves and Steve Osborne. Mixed by Steve Osborne.
- "The Man Who Told Everything" produced by Doves. Mixed by Doves and Steve Osborne.
- "Andalucia", "Blue Water" and "The Drifter" produced by Doves and Dan Austin. Mixed by Dave Bascombe.
- "Push Me On" produced by Doves and John Leckie. Mixed by John Leckie and Dan Austin.
- "Your Shadow Lay Across My Life" produced by Doves. Mixed by Doves and Adrian Bushby.
- "The Last Son" produced by Doves and Dan Austin. Mixed by Dan Austin.
- "Winter Hill" produced by Doves and John Leckie. Mixed by Dave Bascombe.
- Mastered by Miles Showell at Metropolis Mastering, except "Kingdom of Rust", "10:03" and "Jetstream" mastered by Bob Ludwig at Gateway Mastering. "Push Me On" mastered by Guy Davie at Electric Mastering.

Visual

- Art direction and design by Rick Myers (Myers | Art-Utility).
- Cover: firework photography by Pierre Le Hors.
- Interior: live photograph by Stuart Kelly; spikes photograph by Richard Dumas.
- Booklet: additional photography by Richard Mulhearn, Josh Raikes, Rick Myers, Matthew Norman, Natalie Curtis, Ewan Spencer, Mark Thomas, Jon Shard, and Mark Elkins.
- Live poster design: December by Rick Myers; Train by Matthew Norman; The Social by Twelve Ten; Sweden by Henke Walse; U.S. Tour by Michael Jobson; Christmas Tree by Bill Green; Dandelion by Factor27.
