= Live at Eden =

Live at Eden EP

EP by Doves
- Released: 26 April 2005
- Recorded: Eden Sessions, Cornwall, July 2002
- Genre: Indie rock
- Length: 31:00
- Label: Capitol
- Producer: Doves

Doves chronology
Black and White Town (2005)	Live at Eden EP (2005)	Snowden (2005)

Live at Eden is a live EP by Doves, released on 26 April 2005 at select U.S. independent music stores only. All songs were recorded at the Eden Sessions, Cornwall, on 12 July 2002. The songs also feature in the live concert on the DVD Where We're Calling From.

== Track listing ==
All tracks are written by Jez Williams, Jimi Goodwin, and Andy Williams

No.	Title	Length
1.	"Pounding"	3:57
2.	"Words"	4:46
3.	"Catch the Sun"	4:57
4.	"Caught by the River"	5:32
5.	"Satellites"	6:34
6.	"There Goes the Fear"	5:11
