= Where We're Calling From =

Video by Doves
- Released: 29 September 2003
- Recorded: 1998–2002
- Genre: Indie rock
- Length: Approximately 180 mins.
- Label: Heavenly Records
- Director: (See track listing)
- Producer: Doves, Dave Rofe

Doves chronology
Lost Sides (2003)	Where We're Calling From (2003)	Some Cities (2005)

Where We're Calling From is the first full-length DVD release by the band Doves, released on 29 September 2003 (Heavenly Records, HVNDVD001). Where We're Calling From coincided with the band's Lost Sides compilation CD release on the same day. The DVD consists of nine songs recorded live at the Eden Sessions, Cornwall in July 2002, eight of the band's promotional music videos, and documentaries on Doves and Sub Sub, as well as incidental footage, tour films, and hidden features.

The DVD was nominated for Best Music DVD at the British CAD Awards in 2004, the UK's most prestigious music video awards show.

== Track listing ==
Live at the Eden Sessions Cornwall, 12 July 2002:

- Directed by Jez Thierry
1. "Pounding"
2. "There Goes the Fear"
3. "Words"
4. "Catch the Sun"
5. "N.Y."
6. "Satellites"
7. "Caught by the River"
8. "Here It Comes"
9. "Spaceface"

Music videos:

1. "The Cedar Room" (November 1998)
  - Directed by Matthew Norman
2. "Sea Song" (May 1999) (dedicated to Rob Gretton)
  - A film by Rick Myers
3. "Here It Comes" (August 1999)
  - A film by Rick Myers, with Julian Cooper, Rich Mulhearn, and Mat Burhouse
4. "Catch the Sun" (May 2000)
  - Directed by Sophie Muller
5. "The Man Who Told Everything" (October 2000)
  - Directed by Sam Brown
6. "There Goes the Fear" (April 2002)
  - Directed by Julian House and Julian Gibbs at Intro
7. "Pounding" (July 2002)
  - Directed by Julian House and Julian Gibbs at Intro
8. "Caught by the River" (October 2002)
  - Directed by David Mould

Other features:

- "A Very Peak Practice" – 2000 tour intro film
  - Directed and edited by Matthew Norman
  - Camera by Andrew Harris, Charlotte Sargeant, and Matthew Norman
  - Thanks to Express Dairies
  - Features "Suitenoise"
- "Episode One – The Last Intro" – 2002 tour intro film
  - Directed and edited by Matthew Norman
  - Camera by Mark Thomas and Matthew Norman
  - Thanks to Bruised Fruit
- Doves documentary
  - Filmed and edited by Matthew Norman
  - Edited by Martin Swann
  - Produced by Claire Oxley
  - Additional footage by Dave Rofe, Rick Myers, Jay Beard, Matt Cook, and Doves
  - Features audio excerpts from "Words," "The Sulphur Man," "Satellites," "Hit the Ground Running," "N.Y.," "Catch the Sun," "Caught by the River," "Achy Breaky Heart" (written by Don Von Tress), "There Goes the Fear," "Pounding," "The Last Broadcast," and "Say You, Say Me" (written by Lionel Richie)
- Hidden Sub Sub documentary
  - Filmed and directed by Matthew Norman
  - Edited by Martin Swann
  - Produced by Claire Oxley
  - Special thanks to Anthony Wilson for The Haçienda footage
  - Features video excerpts from "Angel" (directed by Swivel), "Ain't No Love (Ain't No Use)" (directed by Swivel), "Respect" (directed by Swivel), "This Time I'm Not Wrong" (directed by Keith Joblin)
  - Features audio excerpts from "Jaggernath" (Andrew Weatherall Mix; flute sample taken from "Soon" by My Bloody Valentine), "Inside of This," "Ecto-Jam-Sub," "Spaceface," "Spaceface" (Techno Todd Dub remixed by Todd Terry), "Angel," "Ain't No Love (Ain't No Use)," "Respect," "Past," "Smoking Beagles," and "This Time I'm Not Wrong"
- "How Things Really Are" – a film by Brian Madden
  - Provoked, filmed, and edited by Brian Madden
  - Additional post-production by Matthew Norman
  - Features excerpts from "N.Y." and "Transmission" (written by Joy Division)
- Demo section
  - Features excerpts from "Catch the Sun," "Here It Comes," "A House," "Rise," "The Cedar Room," "Firesuite," "Break Me Gently," "Words," "N.Y.," "Caught by the River," "Satellites," and "The Sulphur Man"
  - Compiled and edited by Dave Rofe
  - Mastered by Simon Askew
- Doves scrapbook
- Photo galleries
- Screensavers
- Websites
- End credits
- Menu visuals and navigation screens by Stream, based on artwork by Rick Myers
