= Lost Souls (Doves album) =

Studio album by Doves
- Released: 3 April 2000
- Recorded: 1996–2000
- Studios: Frank Bough Sound II (VIBE Recording Studios), Cheetham Hill, Manchester; Jacobs Studios, Farnham, Surrey; The Windings, Wrexham, Wales; Jez Williams' house, Northenden, Manchester; Real World Studios, Box, Wiltshire (track 8)
- Genres: Indie rock; dream pop; neo-psychedelia; post-Britpop; shoegazing; space rock
- Length: 59:09
- Label: Heavenly
- Producers: Doves; Steve Osborne (track 8)

Doves chronology
Here It Comes (1999)	Lost Souls (2000)	Lost Sides (2001)

Doves studio album chronology
Lost Souls (2000)	The Last Broadcast (2002)

Singles from Lost Souls
- 1. "The Cedar Room" Released: 20 March 2000; 2. "Catch the Sun" Released: 29 May 2000; 3. "The Man Who Told Everything" Released: 30 October 2000

Lost Souls is the debut studio album by British indie rock band Doves, released by Heavenly Recordings on 3 April 2000. The album was recorded over a period of several years, following the dissolution of Doves' original musical incarnation as house music act Sub Sub. Lost Souls was a moderate chart success in the UK; the album peaked at number 16, while the three singles taken from the album charted in the Top 40.

Lost Souls was considered by many to be the best debut album by a British act since Oasis' Definitely Maybe. It was met with positive critical acclaim and was a shortlist nominee for the Mercury Prize in 2000. The album was roundly praised on its release for its blending of claustrophobic intensity and euphoria, the sonic influences from electronic music present in its textures and for being "the perfect after-hours soundtrack."

== Background ==
In the early 1990s, Jimi Goodwin and twin brothers Jez and Andy Williams were producing dance music as Sub Sub. The trio, along with guest vocalist Melanie Williams, had a club and chart hit single with "Ain't No Love (Ain't No Use)" in 1993, reaching #3 on the UK Singles Chart and becoming one of many dance singles to cross over into mainstream popularity in the UK. The song would remain Sub Sub's only hit single; the release of the sole studio album Full Fathom Five in September 1994 and a handful of singles thereafter struggled to match the single's success.

In February 1996, on the Williams twins' birthday, the band's recording studio located in Ancoats, Manchester caught fire and burned down, destroying virtually all of the band's equipment and recorded material. In an interview with Excellent Online, Jimi Goodwin said of the fire, "Yeah, we lost tapes, we lost equipment. But we were insured. If we weren't insured, we might not be here now. When forty grand goes up, where would we be to get that back at 22 years old? So, yeah, we were lucky. It was a blessing in a way. I was laughing. After the initial shock, I started giggling, y'know? It was like [looking to the sky], 'What else you gonna throw at me, man? C'mon then, fucking bring it on! Me bird just left me, what else you got?'" The only surviving recorded material recovered from the ashes was released as Delta Tapes in February 1998, featuring early versions of later Doves tracks "Firesuite" and "Blue Water", as well as B-side tracks "Crunch" and "Lost in Watts".

Before the fire, however, the band were already looking towards a new musical direction. In a 2009 interview with QTheMusic.com, Andy Williams stated that, "As Sub Sub we never made the album we thought we were all capable of. We'd always been in love with the idea of albums as opposed to just singles – which are cool in their way and suit dance music perfectly but we wanted to stretch ourselves and make a statement with a set of songs. So around 1996 we started writing and recording the songs which would finally become Lost Souls. We were for all intent and purposes still Sub Sub (we only called ourselves Doves a week or two before The Cedar Room was released, because we wanted a fresh start and a break from the past)."

== Production ==
Sub Sub had been signed to Rob's Records, a label owned by Manchester-based manager Rob Gretton. After the studio fire, Gretton suggested that the band rent the studio owned by New Order in Cheetham Hill (VIBE Recording Studios, nicknamed 'Frank Bough Sound II' by the band) for recording. The bulk of what would become Lost Souls was recorded there; said Andy Williams, "We really did lock ourselves away for three to four years until we discovered how we wanted to sound, it was a pretty oppressive place with no windows and thieves trying to break in! But it was also an inspiring place to be as it belonged to New Order and we were fans ... The garage there was full of their old gear; it was full of vintage keyboards, sequencers, drum machines and was like some weird techno graveyard in there. I also remember finding Stephen Morris' Rogers drum kit that he used in Joy Division stuffed behind some knackered flight case."

The trio – with Gretton's assistance – started their own record label, Casino Records. The first release on the label was Cedar EP, a limited edition 10" vinyl single featuring "The Cedar Room" and "Rise", two songs that would feature prominently on the album, and the instrumental track "Zither". The EP was released in November 1998 and was limited to 1,000 copies. During the album recording sessions, the band were facing the prospect of finding a lead singer, but found themselves more than satisfied with bassist Jimi Goodwin's vocals: "I think the key songs for us on Lost Souls were 'The Cedar Room' and 'Break Me Gently', because they were the first songs Jimi sang properly and we realised we needn't go looking outside the band for this 'mythical singer', something our friend and label boss Rob Gretton had been telling us for years," said Andy Williams. "And once Jimi started we [Andy and Jez] started singing as well. We took years to get there. He recognized something in us and helped us to share it with the world."

"It would be hindsight to wonder what the reaction would have been if we'd have released Lost Souls in 1996. I'm glad it wasn't ready. I wasn't even singing in 1996. I was conveying ideas, but it wasn't a unified decision, like, 'Jimi, you should do it, because we're getting nowhere auditioning singers.' That was a bit later, that was around 1997, maybe even 1998. We were frustrated, though, we wanted it out. ... It's totally different to your Blur and your Oasis, y'know what I mean? It seems to have been the right time for it."

— Jimi Goodwin on the timing of Lost Souls

In late 1998, Doves joined Manchester-based musician Badly Drawn Boy as his backing band; their first release together was the single "Road Movie" in January 1999, recorded live in the studio. Doves also performed on several songs on Badly Drawn Boy's debut album The Hour of Bewilderbeast, as well as accompanied him on tour dates. Doves' second release was the Sea EP in May 1999. A little more than a week before the EP's release, the band's mentor and friend Rob Gretton died of a heart attack. In response, the band dedicated the music video for "Sea Song" to Rob's memory. In August 1999, Doves' third EP Here It Comes was released, with the title track charting at number 73 on the UK Singles Chart.

Doves signed with London-based independent record label Heavenly Recordings, and a reissue of the band's debut single "The Cedar Room" was released as the forthcoming album's first single in March 2000. Andy Williams concluded of Lost Souls that, "The best thing was that after all the years of hard work and very testing times we knew we were finally creating the sort of music we had always wanted to ..." The band also dedicated Lost Souls to their late friend and mentor Rob Gretton.

With their background in dance and house music, the band incorporated a variety of samples on Lost Souls: "A House" features the sounds of a fire burning, "Lost Souls" features funhouse music, "Break Me Gently" interpolates a sample of a telephone recording that originally appeared on hip hop group 3rd Bass's 1989 album The Cactus Album, and "Sea Song" features a spoken-word dialogue extract from the 1984 Wim Wenders film Paris, Texas. The band also cites Talk Talk's seminal 1988 album Spirit of Eden as a chief influence on Lost Souls.

== Release and tours ==
Lost Souls was released on 3 April 2000, and peaked at number 16 on the UK Albums Chart. The album's first single "The Cedar Room" charted at number 33 on the Singles Chart. "Catch the Sun", which was co-produced with Steve Osborne, was released as the album's second single in late May 2000, and third single "The Man Who Told Everything" was released at the end of October 2000. Both songs peaked at number 32 on the Singles Chart. The album's release was supported by tours of the United Kingdom, including opening performances with Oasis at Wembley Stadium and Murrayfield Stadium in July 2000. The band were also augmented live by keyboardist Martin Rebelski, who made his first appearance with Doves on the Here It Comes EP in 1999.

The U.S. release of the album came in October 2000 on Astralwerks, featuring three additional bonus tracks: "Darker", "Valley", and "Zither" (all of which were previously released on singles and EPs in the UK). "Darker" was later featured in the second episode of the American Fox television drama series 24, and also in the movie Dandelion. The band embarked on their first-ever tour of North America in late 2000 and early 2001. Jimi Goodwin described to Excellent Online that the U.S. shows were "pleasantly surprising" with the turn-outs and crowd reactions: "The crowds have been amazing. Pretty much all selling out, which we couldn't believe. ... It's really nice. Astralwerks do seem pretty sussed, and they're just letting us be us. They're just as sniffy as us, going, 'Let's just check it out,' and not trying to convince people that you're the best thing since sliced bread, y'know. Let's just try sneaking in the back door a little. I don't know how American numbers work. I don't know how America works. This is our first time here as a band. We've travelled it, but not musically. We've done a few of them sit-down, meet-and-greets with radio, we've gotten some acoustic work out. ... But, yeah, we're really impressed by people loving the shows and everything. And we're playing better than ever, I think. In England, we've been getting a bit paranoid – 'we can't play this set anymore, we need some new tunes in there.' It's getting a bit old. Time to say, 'Come on lads, the band's playing the same set, time to throw in some new shit.'"

== Reception ==
Professional ratings
Review scores
Source	Rating
AllMusic	4/5 stars
The Guardian	4/5 stars
Los Angeles Times	3.5/4 stars
NME	9/10
Pitchfork	6.8/10
Q	3/5 stars
Record Collector	4/5 stars
The Rolling Stone Album Guide	3.5/5 stars
Select	4/5
Uncut	4/5 stars

Lost Souls was met with generally positive reviews. In a 2009 review, BBC praised the album, and described the album as a rock record that kept the dance spirit alive, but could also appeal to a pop audience: "Lost Souls was a record that was widely discussed, and people wondered aloud whether its success marked the end of another era of dance music. In truth, it was a record about growing up; about giving up the drugs and the madness of The Haçienda, where the three Cheshire lads met. But because the simmering emotion on songs like 'The Cedar Room' was expressed through guitars rather than synths, in no way did that mean that Doves were taking dance music out the back and burying it in a shallow grave. But there was emotion, too – 'The Cedar Room' is a beautiful seven-minute break-up song that complains: 'I tried to sleep alone, but I couldn't do it.' This was a pop album that eventually appealed widely, and not just to the grown-up clubbers that could have been its sole audience." Q called the album "heavy, sombre and lugubrious ... it makes for seriously claustrophobic listening, until it takes a great gulp of euphoria." NME awarded the album 9 out of 10, and called the album "a serious and intense record ... the first great album to come from Manchester since Definitely Maybe... they make being sad after drugs sound great." In a mixed review, Pitchfork reviewer Sam Eccleston took a "straightforward" and "cynical" approach with the album and rated it 6.8 out of 10, saying, "Tonally, Lost Souls reflects the after-after-midnight hours, as if the boys felt the need to document the hung-over and blissed-out aftermath of the dancing-hours frenzy their Sub Sub days offered listeners years ago." The review goes on to say that, "The heart of the problem on Lost Souls is its overreaching ambition ... [but] ... despite its reach and ambition, works best in its most conventionally melodic moments."

Lost Souls was nominated for the Mercury Prize in 2000, but lost out to Badly Drawn Boy's The Hour of Bewilderbeast, the album Doves had featured as a backing band on.

The album was included in the book 1001 Albums You Must Hear Before You Die. Manchester icon and Doves influence Johnny Marr called the album "a vast 3am melancholic beauty brought to life."

== Artwork ==
The sleeve design and artwork was done by frequent Doves collaborator and art director Rick Myers. Myers has done the artwork and design for all of Doves' albums and singles from 1998's Cedar EP to the band's compilation album The Places Between: The Best of Doves in 2010. The photography was done by another frequent Doves collaborator, Richard Mulhearn, and the boxer featured in the photos is Sean McHale of the Ardwick Lads Boxing Club.

In April 2020, to commemorate the 20th anniversary of the release of Lost Souls, Rick Myers posted the original photo montage that comprises the album cover to social media and the official Doves Music Blog.

== Track listing ==
All tracks are written by Jez Williams, Jimi Goodwin, and Andy Williams.

No.	Title	Lead vocals	Length
1.	"Firesuite"	(instrumental)	4:36
2.	"Here It Comes"	A. Williams (verses), Goodwin (chorus)	4:50
3.	"Break Me Gently"	Goodwin	4:38
4.	"Sea Song"	Goodwin	6:12
5.	"Rise"	Goodwin (verses), J. Williams (chorus)	5:38
6.	"Lost Souls"	Goodwin	6:09
7.	"Melody Calls"	A. Williams	3:27
8.	"Catch the Sun"	Goodwin	4:49
9.	"The Man Who Told Everything"	Goodwin	5:47
10.	"The Cedar Room"	Goodwin	7:38
11.	"Reprise"	(instrumental)	1:45
12.	"A House"	Goodwin	3:40

US bonus tracks
No.	Title	Lead vocals	Length
13.	"Darker"	Goodwin	5:51
14.	"Valley"	Goodwin	4:26
15.	"Zither"	(instrumental)	2:36

Japan bonus tracks
No.	Title	Lead vocals	Length
13.	"Valley"	Goodwin	4:26
14.	"Crunch"	(instrumental)	4:00
15.	"Your Shadow Lay Across My Life"	J. Williams, Goodwin	3:45

== Release history ==
Country	Date	Label	Format	Catalogue #
United Kingdom	3 April 2000	Heavenly Recordings	CD	HVNLP26CD
United Kingdom	3 April 2000	Heavenly Recordings	Double LP (heavyweight vinyl; gatefold sleeve)	HVNLP26
United States	17 October 2000	Astralwerks	CD (3 bonus tracks)	ASW 50248 (724385024825)
United States	17 October 2000	Astralwerks	Double LP (numbered edition; gatefold sleeve)	ASW 50248 (724385024818)
Japan	7 March 2001	Toshiba-EMI	CD (3 bonus tracks)	TOCP-65682
Europe	31 May 2019	Universal Strategic Marketing/Virgin EMI	Double LP (limited/numbered edition on grey-coloured vinyl)	7748262
United Kingdom	27 November 2020	Universal Strategic Marketing/Virgin EMI	Double LP (black vinyl)	856866
United States	15 January 2021	Universal Strategic Marketing/Virgin EMI	Double LP (black vinyl)	856866

== Personnel ==
Band

- Jez Williams – electric and acoustic guitars, backing vocals, programming
- Jimi Goodwin – lead vocals (tracks 1–6, 8–10, 12), bass, acoustic guitar, drums on "Here It Comes", samples
- Andy Williams – drums, backing vocals, lead vocals (tracks 2, 7), harmonica (tracks 2, 4, 7), samples

Additional musicians

- Martin Rebelski – piano on "Here It Comes"
- Stuart Warburton – harmonica on "Rise"
- Richard Wheatley – piano and Rhodes on "Firesuite", "Sea Song" and "Break Me Gently"
- Strings on "The Man Who Told Everything" – Kate Evans, Jane Coyle, Barbara Grunthal, Wendy Edison

Production

- All songs produced by Doves, except "Catch the Sun" produced by Steve Osborne with Doves
- "Catch the Sun" mixed by Steve Osborne, assisted by Bruno Ellingham

Visual

- Art direction and design by Rick Myers
- Photography by Richard Mulhearn
- Band shots by Mary Scanlon, Matthew Norman and Roger Sargent

== Charts ==
Chart (2000)	Peak position
Australian Albums Chart	68
Irish Albums Chart	72
UK Albums Chart	16

== Certifications ==
Region	Certification	Certified units/sales
United Kingdom (BPI)	Platinum	300,000^{^}
^{^} Shipments figures based on certification alone.
