= Catch the Sun =

2000 single by Doves

Single by Doves

from the album Lost Souls
- B-side: "Valley"; "Down to Sea"; "Crunch"; "Lost in Watts"
- Released: 29 May 2000
- Genre: Indie rock; post-Britpop
- Length: 4:48 (album version); 4:13 (radio edit)
- Label: Heavenly
- Songwriters: Jez Williams; Jimi Goodwin; Andy Williams
- Producers: Doves; Steve Osborne

Doves singles chronology
"The Cedar Room" (2000)	"Catch the Sun" (2000)	"The Man Who Told Everything" (2000)

Music video
- "Catch the Sun" on YouTube

"Catch the Sun" is the second single from English indie rock band Doves' debut studio album, Lost Souls.

== Background ==
The single was released in the United Kingdom on 29 May 2000 and peaked at number 32 on the UK Singles Chart. In February 2001, the song was serviced to rock radio in the United States and reached number 40 on Radio & Records' Alternative Top 50 chart. The psychedelic, kaleidoscopic music video for "Catch the Sun" was directed by Sophie Muller.

== B-sides ==
"Down to Sea" is an early demo of "Sea Song". The B-sides for CD2 are songs from Doves' previous incarnation as Sub Sub. The versions of "Crunch" and "Lost in Watts" differ slightly from those found on Sub Sub's album Delta Tapes. "Crunch" is an edit, and "Lost in Watts" is an alternate mix omitting some background vocals (which are prominent on the Delta Tapes version). "Valley" features the piano riff from the Beach Boys' Smile-era songs "Do You Like Worms" and "Heroes and Villains".

== Track listings ==
All tracks are written by Jez Williams, Jimi Goodwin, and Andy Williams.

UK CD1 and 10-inch single
No.	Title	Length
1.	"Catch the Sun"	4:48
2.	"Valley"	4:23
3.	"Down to Sea"	4:36

UK CD2
No.	Title	Length
1.	"Catch the Sun"	4:48
2.	"Crunch"	4:00
3.	"Lost in Watts"	4:56

== Charts ==
Chart (2000–2001)	Peak position
Scottish Singles Sales (Official Charts)	33
UK Singles (Official Charts)	32
US Alternative Top 50 (Radio & Records)	40

== Release history ==
Region	Date	Format(s)	Label(s)	Ref.
United Kingdom	29 May 2000	10-inch vinyl; CD	Heavenly	
United States	26 February 2000	Triple-A radio	Astralwerks; Heavenly	
United States	27 February 2000	Alternative radio	Astralwerks; Heavenly	
