= Cedar (Doves album) =

EP by Doves
- Released: 9 November 1998
- Recorded: 1998
- Genre: Indie rock
- Length: 15:08
- Label: Casino Records
- Producer: Doves

Doves chronology
Cedar (1998)	Sea EP (1999)

Cedar is the debut EP from Doves, the first release from the band after the dissolution of their previous incarnation, Sub Sub. It was self-released on the band's Casino Records label (co-founded by Rob Gretton) on 9 November 1998 on limited 10" vinyl. The track "The Cedar Room" later became the band's first single from their debut album Lost Souls. Following the release of the Cedar EP, Doves briefly joined Badly Drawn Boy as his backing band.

In a 2000 interview with Duke University, drummer Andy Williams said of "The Cedar Room":

I wrote the verse lyrics and Jimi wrote the chorus lyrics. The Cedar Room was actually a room in a haunted house from when we were kids. The name just got stuck in my head. It's a very love kind of vibe.

The track "Zither" is a cover of Jack Nitzsche's opening theme for the 1981 film Cutter's Way.

== Track listing ==
All tracks are written by Jez Williams, Jimi Goodwin, and Andy Williams.

No.	Title	Length
1.	"Rise"	5:38
2.	"Zither"	2:32
3.	"The Cedar Room"	7:38

== Notes ==
- Casino Records CHIP001.
- All tracks recorded and mixed by Doves at Frank Bough Sound Mk. II.
- Harmonica by Stuart Warburton.
- Sleeve design and artwork by Rick Myers.
