= Andalucia (Doves song) =

Single by Doves

from the album The Places Between: The Best of Doves
- B-side: "Jetstream" (Acoustic)
- Released: 1 March 2010
- Recorded: 2009
- Genre: Indie rock
- Length: 3:59 (radio edit); 4:21 (album version)
- Label: Heavenly Records; Virgin Records/EMI
- Songwriter(s): Jez Williams, Jimi Goodwin, Andy Williams
- Producer(s): Doves, Dan Austin

Doves singles chronology
"Winter Hill" (2009)	"Andalucia" (2010)	"Carousels" (2020)

Music video
- "Andalucia" on YouTube

"Andalucia" is a single from Doves' best-of compilation, titled The Places Between: The Best of Doves. The song was released as a promo single on 1 March 2010. The single received its first airplay on Zane Lowe's BBC Radio 1 show on 3 March 2010, and again on 4 March 2010, on Steve Lamacq's BBC 6 Music radio show Roundtable. The song was then released as a digital download-only single on 5 April 2010, the same day the compilation was released. It was the band's final single before their ten-year hiatus. "Andalucia" also marks the first Doves single release not available commercially on a physical format.

A music video was produced for the song, filmed in Granada and directed by Soup Collective and photographer Percy Dean, but was not included on the DVD for The Places Between. nthWORD said of the music video, "It's very possible that the video for Doves' "Andalucia" will start your day off on the right feet. Dig the old man." A video of Jimi Goodwin and Jez Williams performing an acoustic version of "Andalucia" at the Jodrell Bank Observatory in Cheshire premiered on The Guardian's website on 4 April 2010.

== Track listings ==
All tracks are written by Jez Williams, Jimi Goodwin, and Andy Williams.

Promo CD-R (no catalog number)
No.	Title	Length
1.	"Andalucia" (Radio Edit)	3:59
2.	"Andalucia" (Instrumental)	4:21

Digital download (HVN201)
No.	Title	Length
1.	"Andalucia"	4:21
2.	"Jetstream" (Acoustic Version)	3:27

== Credits ==
- "Andalucia" produced by Doves and Dan Austin.
- Mixed by Dave Bascombe.
- Violin by Belinda Hammond.
- Art direction by Rick Myers and Art-Utility.
