= Constellations for the Lonely =

Studio album by Doves
- Released: 28 February 2025
- Recorded: 2020–2024
- Studios: Frank Bough Sound III, Cheshire
- Length: 44:50
- Label: EMI North
- Producers: Doves; Dan Austin (Note: Producer with Doves on "Saint Teresa")

Doves chronology
| The Universal Want (2020) | Constellations for the Lonely (2025) | So, Here We Are: Best of Doves (2025) |

Singles from Constellations for the Lonely
- 1. "Renegade" Released: 4 November 2024; 2. "Cold Dreaming" Released: 8 January 2025; 3. "Saint Teresa" Released: 10 February 2025; 4. "A Drop in the Ocean" Released: 26 February 2025; 5. "Cally" / "Lean into the Wind" Released: 12 April 2025

Constellations for the Lonely is the sixth studio album by British rock band Doves. The album was released by EMI North, the band's first for the label, on 28 February 2025. Described by the band as a "dark" album, guitarist/singer Jez Williams said in an interview with NME, "We're living in pretty fucking horrible times, so we wanted to reflect that but give a little hope. [...] I see this as a future soul album for outsiders. We want you to feel understood."

Constellations for the Lonely was released following a troubled period in the band's history, as singer/bassist Jimi Goodwin sought treatment for mental health and substance abuse issues following the release of previous album The Universal Want; this resulted in his being sidelined from touring for Constellations. The album was met with critical praise, and charted at #5 on the UK Albums Chart and at #1 on the Scottish Albums Chart.

== Background ==
Constellations for the Lonely follows over four years since the trio's comeback album The Universal Want and the cancelled proposed tour to support the album in 2020 and 2021. Singer/bassist Jimi Goodwin had been struggling with mental health and substance abuse issues, which prompted the band to cancel all remaining promotion for the album whilst Goodwin sought treatment. In an interview with NME, Goodwin said that there was "a loose thread that kicked the record off," with album opener and first single "Renegade" being the first thing the band recorded together for the album. Goodwin told NME, "In our minds, it's got a Blade Runner-esque theme. It was inspired by the Roy Batty speech of how nothing lasts forever, you know, 'I've seen things you people wouldn't believe.'" Jez Williams furthered, "This is quite a dark album. We started to write it after we cancelled The Universal Want tour, so some of the songs reflect that. We wanted 'Renegade' to start with this apocalyptic atmosphere. That's what felt right for us after such a difficult time. Jimi was with us, but we were trying to make sense of all the mess – and that fed into the album."

The album features vocals from all three members throughout, with the Williams brothers leading second single "Cold Dreaming". Joe Taysom of Far Out stated that "Doves carry the weight equally between them, which has been their blessing. When one of them is falling, the others are there to ease the burden of responsibility, which has enabled them to survive everything thrown at them". "Cold Dreaming" and "Last Year's Man" feature drummer Andy Williams singing lead vocals for the first time since "Shadows of Salford" from Some Cities (2005).

The band announced a live tour in promotion of the album for February and March 2025, without Jimi Goodwin due to his ongoing recovery. The live band were augmented by longtime collaborator Martin Rebelski as well as Nathan Sudders and Jake Evans. The current line-up performed three intimate live shows in Stoke-on-Trent, Birkenhead and Hebden Bridge, in preparation for the tour, in November 2024.

Doves issued a third digital-only single in advance of the album with "Saint Teresa" on 10 February 2025, shortly after the announcement of a special red-coloured 10" vinyl single release of deluxe edition bonus tracks "Cally" and "Lean into the Wind" for Record Store Day on 12 April 2025. "A Drop in the Ocean", the album's fourth single, preceded the album's release on 26 February 2025 as a digital download; an accompanying music video also premiered.

== Critical reception ==
Professional ratings
Aggregate scores
| Source | Rating |
|---|---|
| AnyDecentMusic? | 7.7/10 |
| Metacritic | 82/100 |
Review scores
| Source | Rating |
| Clash | 9/10 |
| The Daily Telegraph | 5/5 stars |
| Louder Than War | 5/5 |
| Mojo | 4/5 stars |
| Record Collector | 4/5 stars |

Constellations for the Lonely was met with resounding critical praise. At Metacritic, which assigns a normalized rating out of 100 to reviews from mainstream critics, the album received an average score of 82 based on ten reviews, indicating "universal acclaim". Louder Than War deemed the album their "Album of the Week" for its release week, and awarded the record a perfect rating. Welsh independent website Buzz Magazine gave the album a 5 out of 5-star rating, stating "Constellations, with its songs of disconnection and reconnection in a volatile world, is an emotionally powerful listen that packs an authentic punch matched by its widescreen sonic beauty. Despite many obstacles thrown in their path, Doves seem to never fail to impress when they return and this album is no exception." Record Collector awarded Constellations for the Lonely 4 out of 5 stars, commenting that "the atmosphere is more claustrophobic; the darkness heightened, with less of a buffer to the difficult feelings", whilst concluding that "Doves have endured intact, hopeful, and with a document to perseverance that is fitting for one of indie-rock's great survivors."

== Track listing ==
All tracks are written by Jez Williams, Jimi Goodwin, and Andy Williams.

Constellations for the Lonely track listing
| No. | Title | Lead vocals | Length |
|---|---|---|---|
| 1. | "Renegade" | Goodwin | 5:12 |
| 2. | "Cold Dreaming" | A. / J. Williams | 5:02 |
| 3. | "In the Butterfly House" | Goodwin | 4:10 |
| 4. | "Strange Weather" | J. Williams | 4:41 |
| 5. | "A Drop in the Ocean" | Goodwin | 4:26 |
| 6. | "Last Year's Man" | A. Williams | 4:26 |
| 7. | "Stupid Schemes" | Goodwin | 4:46 |
| 8. | "Saint Teresa" | Goodwin | 4:56 |
| 9. | "Orlando" | Goodwin | 3:26 |
| 10. | "Southern Bell" | J. Williams / Goodwin | 3:46 |
| Total length: | | | 44:50 |

Limited edition CD bonus tracks
| No. | Title | Lead vocals | Length |
|---|---|---|---|
| 11. | "Cally" | Goodwin | 2:26 |
| 12. | "Lean into the Wind" | Goodwin | 3:50 |
| 13. | "Saint Teresa" (Drautwerk version) | Goodwin | 6:05 |

== Personnel ==
Credits adapted from Tidal.

=== Doves ===
- Jimi Goodwin – background vocals, production (all tracks); lead vocals (tracks 1, 3, 5, 7–10), bass guitar (6–8), programming (8, 9); drums, guitar (8); synthesizer (9)
- Jez Williams – guitar, production (all tracks); mixing (tracks 1–7, 9, 10), bass guitar (1–5), background vocals (1–3, 5–8, 10), string arrangement (1, 2, 4, 6, 10), programming (1, 2, 9), synthesizer (1, 4, 5, 8, 10), lead vocals (2, 4, 10)
- Andy Williams – production (all tracks), drums (tracks 1–5, 9), programming (1, 2), background vocals (1, 3, 4, 6, 8–10), keyboards (1, 9), lead vocals (2, 6), percussion (3–10), samples (5), harmonica (6)

=== Additional contributors ===
- Elinor Gow – cello (tracks 1, 2, 4, 6, 10)
- Jayne Coyle – viola (tracks 1, 2, 4, 6, 10)
- Belinda Hammond – violin (tracks 1, 2, 4, 6, 10)
- Hannah Groarke-Young – violin (tracks 1, 2, 4, 6, 10)
- Martin Rebelski – keyboards (tracks 1, 2, 5, 6, 9, 10)
- Fredrik Björling – drums (track 7)
- Matt Colton – mastering
- Dan Austin – producer and mixing (track 8)
- Seadna McPhail – engineering (tracks 1, 2, 4, 6, 10)
- Martin King – engineering (track 3)

== Charts ==
Chart performance for Constellations for the Lonely
| Chart (2025) | Peak position |
|---|---|
| Irish Albums (IRMA) | 64 |
| Scottish Albums (Official Charts) | 1 |
| UK Albums (Official Charts) | 5 |

== Release history ==
Release history and formats for Constellations for the Lonely
| Country | Date | Label | Format | Catalogue # | Notes |
|---|---|---|---|---|---|
| Various | 28 February 2025 | EMI North | CD | EMINCD002 | |
| Various | 28 February 2025 | EMI North | Limited edition CD with 3 bonus tracks | EMINCDX002 | Doves' webstore exclusive |
| Various | 28 February 2025 | EMI North | LP | EMINV002 | |
| Various | 28 February 2025 | EMI North | Marble-white-coloured LP | | Doves' webstore exclusive |
| Various | 28 February 2025 | EMI North | Cassette | EMINMC002 | Doves' webstore exclusive |
| Various | 28 February 2025 | EMI North | Orange-coloured LP | EMINVY002 | Independent record stores exclusive |
| Various | 28 February 2025 | EMI North | Black smoke with purple splatter-coloured LP | BLOOD431 | Blood Records UK exclusive |
| Various | 4 July 2025 | EMI North | Deluxe edition digital download | 006024 78026904 | Includes 2 bonus tracks and instrumentals of the 10-track album |
