= The Man Who Told Everything =

2000 single by Doves

- CD1 cover

Single by Doves

from the album Lost Souls
- B-side: "Rise" (live); "Suitenoise"; "Your Shadow Lay Across My Life"; "Firesuite"
- Released: 30 October 2000
- Length: 5:47 (album version); 4:25 (radio edit); 5:43 (Summer version)
- Label: Heavenly
- Songwriters: Jez Williams; Jimi Goodwin; Andy Williams
- Producer: Doves

Doves singles chronology
"Catch the Sun" (2000)	"The Man Who Told Everything" (2000)	"There Goes the Fear" (2002)

Music video
- "The Man Who Told Everything" on YouTube

Alternative cover
- CD2 cover

"The Man Who Told Everything" is the third single from English indie rock band Doves' debut studio album, Lost Souls. The single was released on 30 October 2000 on 6 November 2000 and peaked at number 33 on the UK Singles Chart. The single version is subtitled "Summer Version" and features a different mix from the album version. The live version of "Rise" on CD1 was recorded live for Australia's Triple J Radio. "The Cedar Room" and "Here It Comes", recorded live at the same sessions, would later be included as B-sides to the band's "There Goes the Fear" single in Europe in 2002 and the Japanese extended play for "Pounding".

== Track listings ==
All tracks are written by Jez Williams, Jimi Goodwin, and Andy Williams.

UK CD1
No.	Title	Length
1.	"The Man Who Told Everything" (Summer version)	5:43
2.	"Rise" (live Triple J at the Wireless)	4:48
3.	"Suitenoise"	4:13

UK CD2
No.	Title	Length
1.	"The Man Who Told Everything" (Summer version)	5:43
2.	"Your Shadow Lay Across My Life"	3:45
3.	"Firesuite" (Noise version)	3:09

UK 7-inch single
No.	Title	Length
1.	"The Man Who Told Everything" (Summer version)	5:43
2.	"Your Shadow Lay Across My Life"	3:45

== Charts ==
Chart (2000)	Peak position
Scotland Singles (OCC)	33
UK Singles (OCC)	31
