= Lost Sides =

Compilation album by Doves

Compilation album by Doves
- Released: 29 September 2003
- Recorded: 1998–2002
- Genre: Indie rock
- Length: CD1: 44:45; CD2: 40:28; Total: 1:25:13
- Label: Heavenly
- Producer: Doves

Doves chronology
The Last Broadcast (2002)	Lost Sides (2003)	Some Cities (2005)

Professional ratings
Review scores
Source	Rating
AllMusic	3/5 stars
Pitchfork	6.0/10

Lost Sides is a compilation album by the British indie rock band Doves. The original incarnation of Lost Sides was a promotional-only CD released in 2001, and only featured the B-sides from the singles taken from the band's debut album Lost Souls. The commercial edition of Lost Sides was released with a revised track listing in September 2003 as a single CD and as a limited edition double disc set. The first disc contains B-sides from Doves' first two albums, whilst the second disc features remixed material. The 2003 issue coincided with the band's first DVD release Where We're Calling From.

== Track listing ==
All tracks are written by Jez Williams, Jimi Goodwin and Andy Williams, except where noted.

"Zither" is credited to Williams/Goodwin/Williams, but the song is a cover of Jack Nitzsche's opening theme for the 1981 film Cutter's Way.

CD1
No.	Title	Writer(s)	Lead vocals	Length
1.	"Break Me Gently" (Incidental)		(instrumental)	1:24
2.	"Darker"		Goodwin	5:51
3.	"Your Shadow Lay Across My Life"		J. Williams, Goodwin	3:45
4.	"Meet Me at the Pier"		(instrumental)	3:02
5.	"Down to Sea"		Goodwin	4:22
6.	"Crunch"		(instrumental)	4:00
7.	"Zither"	Jack Nitzsche	(instrumental)	2:32
8.	"Valley"		Goodwin	4:23
9.	"Northenden"		Goodwin	4:02
10.	"Hit the Ground Running"	Zevon, Marinell, Wachtel	A. Williams	2:54
11.	"Willow's Song"	Traditional	Goodwin	3:58
12.	"Far from Grace"		Goodwin	4:26

CD2
No.	Title	Writer(s)	Lead vocals	Length
1.	"Words" (Echoboy Remix)		J. Williams	7:25
2.	"N.Y." (Chris Coco Remix)		Goodwin	4:27
3.	"M62 Song" (Four Tet Mix)	Williams, Goodwin, Williams, Fripp, Giles, Lake, McDonald, Sinfield	A. Williams	6:26
4.	"The Sulphur Man" (Rebelski Remix)		Goodwin	4:56
5.	"The Last Broadcast" (Magnet Remix)		Goodwin	5:24
6.	"Where We're Calling From" (Hebden Bridge Remix)		(instrumental)	6:43
7.	"Satellites" (Soulsavers Remix)		Goodwin	5:04

== Charts ==
Chart (2003)	Peak position
UK Albums Chart	50

Lost Sides

Compilation album by Doves
- Released: 2 January 2001
- Recorded: 1998–2000
- Genre: Indie rock
- Length: 45:04
- Language: English
- Label: Heavenly
- Producer: Doves

Doves chronology
Lost Souls (2000)	Lost Sides (2001)	The Last Broadcast (2002)

== Original promo CD ==
At the end of 2000, the original issue of Lost Sides was released as a promo-only CD (HVNLP29CD). The original artwork featured the boxer from Doves' Lost Souls album, and included only the b-sides from the first album and early EPs.

"Crunch" and "Lost in Watts" are two tracks from Doves' previous incarnation as Sub Sub, but the versions of the songs found on this collection differ slightly from those found on Sub Sub's album Delta Tapes.

=== Track listing ===
All tracks are written by Jez Williams, Jimi Goodwin and Andy Williams, except where noted.

No.	Title	Writer(s)	Lead vocals	Length
1.	"Zither"	Nitzsche	(instrumental)	2:34
2.	"Break Me Gently" (Incidental)		(instrumental)	1:33
3.	"Darker"		Goodwin	5:52
4.	"Meet Me at the Pier"		(instrumental)	3:10
5.	"Acoustic No. 1"		(instrumental)	2:39
6.	"Karen"		Goodwin	3:22
7.	"Valley"		Goodwin	4:25
8.	"Down to Sea"		Goodwin	4:36
9.	"Crunch"		(instrumental)	4:04
10.	"Lost in Watts"		(instrumental)	4:56
11.	"Your Shadow Lay Across My Life"		J. Williams, Goodwin	3:45
12.	"Suitenoise"		(instrumental)	4:13

== Release history ==
Country	Date	Label	Format	Catalogue #
United Kingdom	2 January 2001	Heavenly Records	Promo CD (cardboard sleeve)	HVNLP29CD
United Kingdom	29 September 2003	Heavenly Records	CD	HVNLP46CD
United Kingdom	29 September 2003	Heavenly Records	CD/bonus CD	HVNLP46CDX
Europe	29 September 2003	Heavenly Records/EMI	CD/bonus CD (both discs are Copy-Controlled)	7243 5 94500 2 5
