= Here It Comes (Doves EP) =

1999 EP by Doves

EP by Doves
- Released: 2 August 1999
- Length: 10:26
- Label: Casino
- Producer: Doves

Doves EP chronology
Sea EP (1998)	Here It Comes (1999)	Live at Eden (2005)

Music video
- "Here It Comes" on YouTube

Here It Comes is the third extended play (EP) by English indie rock band Doves. It was released on 2 August 1999 as the last release from the band's Casino Records label. Martin Rebelski, the unofficial fourth member of Doves, plays piano on the title track. The EP peaked at number 73 on the UK Singles Chart. In 2001, lead track "Here It Comes" was serviced to US adult album alternative radio.

== Track listing ==
All tracks are written by Jez Williams, Jimi Goodwin, and Andy Williams.

No.	Title	Length
1.	"Here It Comes"	4:37
2.	"Meet Me at the Pier"	3:10
3.	"Acoustic No. 1"	2:39

== Notes ==
- Casino Records CHIP003.
- All songs written, produced, and arranged by Doves.
- "Here It Comes" engineered by Martin Wilding.
- Piano on "Here It Comes" by Martin Rebelski.
- Sleeve design and artwork by Rick Myers.

== Charts ==
Chart (1999)	Peak position
Scotland Singles (OCC)	74
UK Singles (OCC)	73
UK Indie (OCC)	13

== Release history ==
Region	Date	Format(s)	Label(s)	Ref.
United Kingdom	2 August 1999	10-inch vinyl; CD	Casino	
United States	11 June 2001	Triple A radio	Heavenly; Astralwerks	
