= The Last Broadcast (album) =

Studio album by Doves
- Released: 29 April 2002
- Recorded: January 2001–January 2002
- Studios: Revolution, Manchester; Parr Street Studios, Liverpool; The Dairy, Brixton; 2 kHz, Shepherd's Bush; Real World Studios, Bath, Somerset; Under the M60 motorway flyover, Northenden; Jez Williams' house; Lynch Mob Studio, London; Various country seats
- Genres: Indie rock, post-Britpop, dream pop, neo-psychedelia
- Length: 53:55
- Label: Heavenly
- Producers: Doves; Steve Osborne, Max Heyes

Doves chronology
Lost Sides (2001)	The Last Broadcast (2002)	Lost Sides (reissue) (2003)

Doves studio album chronology
Lost Souls (2000)	The Last Broadcast (2002)	Some Cities (2005)

Singles from The Last Broadcast
- 1. "There Goes the Fear" Released: 15 April 2002; 2. "Pounding" Released: 22 July 2002; 3. "Caught by the River" Released: 14 October 2002

The Last Broadcast is the second studio album by British indie rock band Doves. The album was released by Heavenly Recordings on 29 April 2002, and went straight to number 1 on the UK Albums Chart. The album's first single "There Goes the Fear" entered the UK Singles Chart at number 3, the band's highest-charting single to date, despite being released and deleted on the same day. Two further singles, "Pounding" and "Caught by the River", were also successful, charting in the Top 30. The Last Broadcast garnered critical acclaim upon its release, and was a shortlist nominee for the Mercury Prize in 2002.

== Background and recording ==
Following the success of their debut album Lost Souls and subsequent tours of the United Kingdom and their first tour of North America, the band entered the studio in January 2001 to begin work on the follow-up album. "When we went back into the studio this time, we were determined to get rid of the perception that people had of us," said Jimi Goodwin in an interview with NME. Jez Williams told NME, "This time around, we had a lot more confidence." In a 2010 interview with Spinner.com, Jez furthered, "It was like a big burst of energy... it affected our songwriting. We wanted it to be optimistic, more hopeful."

The band moved away from the Cheetham Hill studio they had recorded Lost Souls in for Revolution Studios in Manchester, Parr Street Studios in Liverpool, Peter Gabriel's Real World Studios in Bath, The Dairy and 2 kHz Studios in London, and a cottage in Lancashire. Additionally, "M62 Song" is credited as being recorded under a flyover of the M62 motorway in Northenden. However, in a 2022 interview on the XS Long Player Podcast with Jim Salveson, Andy Williams revealed that the song was actually recorded under the M60 motorway flyover but the band "got the name wrong," also adding that "'M62 Song' sounds better anyway".

In a 2009 interview with QTheMusic.com, Jez said that the songs came quickly and effortlessly: "I had this little house in Northenden where my makeshift studio was. It took a couple of nights to get the backing track with the top line melody to 'There Goes the Fear'. Literally the next night I had 'Words' coming out of the speakers."

"Caught by the River" was the final song recorded for the album, which took form at a rehearsal room in Stockport called The Green Room. "Jimi, Andy and I just started to play these three chords. Jimi started to sing this great top line melody and there it was... very natural and easy. Andy started to write these very poignant lyrics about a friend of ours; everything started to click like at the start of the recording. That was the last piece of the jigsaw for the album," said Jez.

The band also incorporated string, brass, and woodwind arrangements into the songs, arranged by The High Llamas frontman Sean O'Hagan, as well as gospel choir vocals on "Satellites", while lead single "There Goes the Fear" features a Brazilian Carnival-inspired percussive outro. Doves wrote, recorded, and mixed the album within eight months, "which for Doves was incredibly fast," concluded Jez Williams.

"M62 Song" is credited to the band and Robert Fripp, Michael Giles, Greg Lake, Ian McDonald, and Peter Sinfield because, as stated in the album sleeve, the song is an adaptation of "Moonchild" by King Crimson. Similarly, the B-side "Hit the Ground Running" is an adaptation of "Werewolves of London" by Warren Zevon.

== Release and legacy ==
"For me they were good days. The simple focus of writing and recording that album; no personal fuck-ups or problems, I was in a good place. We were just in it riding the wave – enjoying the act of making music – so simple!"

— Jez Williams on the album's streamlined recording process

The Last Broadcast was released on 29 April 2002, and topped the UK Albums Chart. The release of the first single "There Goes the Fear" on 15 April brought the band their highest-charting single to date, peaking at number 3 on the UK Singles Chart. The single, pressed as a limited edition eCD and a 10" vinyl record, was released and deleted on the same day. When asked in a 2010 interview with Under the Radar as to why the single was limited, Jez Williams stated, "It was to do something different from the norm. Just wanted to try something different really. I can't remember exactly whose idea it was. It might have been the manager's, but we were kind of into it. A kind of statement, in a way. We liked the fact that you could only get a hold of a certain amount of this or a certain amount of that. Especially in this day and age of readily available bits of music, it's kind of nice: a physical copy that's precious to you because you managed to get to the shop that day and actually own that." The Last Broadcast sold 52,000 copies in its first week, and has since been certified platinum by the British Phonographic Industry. The album's second single "Pounding" was released in July 2002, and peaked at number 21, while third and final single "Caught by the River" was released in October 2002 and reached number 29 on the charts. Like "There Goes the Fear" before them, the singles for "Pounding" and "Caught by the River" were also limited in released quantities. The Last Broadcast was released by Capitol Records in the United States on 4 June 2002; first pressings of the album stateside included a limited edition bonus disc, featuring four songs released as B-sides on the UK singles.

The band began touring in promotion for the album at the end of February 2002. By summer of 2002, Doves were touring for the album in the United States, the Netherlands and Europe, Australia, and Japan. Their July performance at The Eden Sessions in Cornwall was filmed and featured on the band's full-length compilation DVD Where We're Calling From, released in September 2003. In addition to the live concert, the DVD prominently featured a documentary on the band, including previously unreleased footage of the recording of The Last Broadcast as well as previous album Lost Souls, along with all of the band's music videos to date and a myriad of special features.

A remixed version of "Words" entitled Live for City is played at the start of all Manchester City F.C. games at the City of Manchester Stadium, due to the band's support of the team. The intro to "Words" has also been used as the background music for both ITV Sport's FA Cup coverage and the NFL Network's commercials during the 2006-07 football season. "There Goes the Fear" was featured in the film and on the original motion picture soundtrack to (500) Days of Summer in 2009, while "Pounding" was used in the Vancouver 2010 Winter Olympics With Glowing Hearts/Des Plus Brilliants Exploits advertisement campaign and in pre-event intros.

== Reception ==
Professional ratings
Aggregate scores
Source	Rating
Metacritic	85/100
Review scores
Source	Rating
AllMusic	4/5 stars
Entertainment Weekly	A−
The Guardian	3/5 stars
Los Angeles Times	3.5/4 stars
NME	9/10
Pitchfork	8.0/10
Q	4/5 stars
Rolling Stone	3/5 stars
Uncut	5/5 stars
The Village Voice	B−

The Last Broadcast was met with critical praise. At Metacritic, which assigns a normalised rating out of 100 to reviews from mainstream critics, the album has received an average score of 85, based on 20 reviews. NME awarded the album 9 out of 10 stars, calling the album "the most uplifting miserable album you'll hear all year." The Austin Chronicle called the album "[a] stunner... an infectious, melancholy, ultimately euphoric barrage of sound wrapped in a sheeting of guitars and subtle effects that coalesce around frontman Jimi Goodwin's plaintive voice and brothers Jez and Andy Williams' lovely, pounding, relentless vibe that echoes with hints of Northern soul and terrifically big beats." Blender called the album "utterly entrancing," while AllMusic praised it as a "musical daybreak."

Like its predecessor Lost Souls in 2000, The Last Broadcast was nominated for the Mercury Prize in 2002. The album lost to Ms. Dynamite's debut album A Little Deeper. Kludge included it on their list of best albums of 2002.

== Track listing ==
All tracks are written by Jez Williams, Jimi Goodwin, and Andy Williams, except where noted.

No.	Title	Writer(s)	Lead vocals	Length
1.	"Intro"		(instrumental)	1:18
2.	"Words"		J. Williams	5:42
3.	"There Goes the Fear"		Goodwin	6:54
4.	"M62 Song"	Williams, Goodwin, Williams, Fripp, Giles, Lake, McDonald, Sinfield	A. Williams	3:48
5.	"Where We're Calling From"		(instrumental)	1:24
6.	"N.Y."		Goodwin	5:46
7.	"Satellites"		Goodwin	6:50
8.	"Friday's Dust"		Goodwin	3:35
9.	"Pounding"		Goodwin	4:45
10.	"Last Broadcast"		Goodwin	3:22
11.	"The Sulphur Man"		Goodwin	4:37
12.	"Caught by the River"		Goodwin	5:55

Limited edition US bonus disc
No.	Title	Writer(s)	Lead vocals	Length
1.	"Hit the Ground Running"	Zevon, Marinell, Wachtel	A. Williams	2:54
2.	"Far from Grace"		Goodwin	4:24
3.	"Northenden"		Goodwin	4:03
4.	"Willow's Song" (full length version)	Traditional	Goodwin	4:20

Japan bonus tracks
No.	Title	Lead vocals	Length
13.	"Far from Grace"	Goodwin	4:24
14.	"Northenden"	Goodwin	4:03

== Release history ==
Country	Date	Label	Format	Catalogue #
United Kingdom	29 April 2002	Heavenly Recordings	CD	HVNLP35CD
United Kingdom	29 April 2002	Heavenly Recordings	Double LP (heavyweight vinyl; gatefold sleeve)	HVNLP35
Japan	1 May 2002	Toshiba-EMI	CD (2 bonus tracks)	TOCP-65975
Japan	22 January 2003	Toshiba-EMI	CD (tour edition with purple-tinted artwork; 2 bonus tracks + enhanced video)	TOCP-66129
United States	4 June 2002	Capitol Records	CD (initial pressings include bonus disc)	724381223222
Europe	31 May 2019	Universal Strategic Marketing/Virgin EMI	Double LP (limited/numbered edition on orange-coloured vinyl)	7748263
United Kingdom	27 November 2020	Universal Strategic Marketing/Virgin EMI	Double LP (black vinyl)	857375
United States	15 January 2021	Universal Strategic Marketing/Virgin EMI	Double LP (black vinyl)	857375

== Credits ==
=== Doves ===
- Jimi Goodwin – lead vocals (tracks 3, 6–12), bass, guitars, backing vocals on "Words" and "M62 Song", programming
- Jez Williams – guitars, backing vocals, lead vocals on "Words", keyboards on "Last Broadcast"
- Andy Williams – drums, percussion, backing vocals, lead vocals on "M62 Song", harmonica on "N.Y."

=== Production ===
- Produced by Doves, except "Satellites" produced by Steve Osborne for 140 dB, and "Caught by the River" co-produced by Steve Osborne and Doves.
- Additional production by Martin "Max" Heyes for Z Mint.
- Recorded, programmed and mixed by Doves and Max Heyes.
- Recorded and mixed between January 2001 and January 2002 at: Revolution, Manchester; Parr St., Liverpool; The Dairy and 2 kHz, London; Real World, Bath; under the M60 flyover, Northenden; Jez's house; Lynch Mob studio; and various country seats.
- Mastered by Miles Showell at Metropolis.
- Engineered by Max Heyes, Adrian Bushby, and Danton Supple.
- Andrea Wright, Darren Nash, Marco Migliari, and Paul Grady – assistant engineering
- Art direction and design by Rick Myers.
- Photography by Rich Mulhearn.
- Band photograph by Kevin Westenberg.

=== Additional musicians ===
- Martin Rebelski – keyboards and glockenspiel on "Words," "N.Y.," "Satellites," and "The Sulphur Man"
- Brian Madden – megaphone on "Words"
- Jay Rofe-Turner – tambourine on "Satellites"
- Marc Starr, Chris Davies, Billy Booth, and Richard Sliwa – percussion on "There Goes the Fear"
- Rosie Lowdell – violin on "Words" and "The Sulphur Man"
- Paulette Bailey and Celia Goodwin – violin on "N.Y."
- Rob Shepley – viola on "N.Y."
- Ian Bracken – cello on "N.Y."
- Jackie Norrie and Sally Herbert – violin on "Friday's Dust" and "The Sulphur Man"
- Brian Wright – violin and viola on "Friday's Dust" and "The Sulphur Man"
- Marcus Holdaway – cello on "Friday's Dust" and "The Sulphur Man"
- Sean O'Hagan and Marcus Holdaway – string, brass & woodwind arrangement on "Friday's Dust" and "The Sulphur Man"
- Marcus Holdaway – string arrangement on "Friday's Dust" and "The Sulphur Man"
- Andy Robinson – brass woodwind arrangement & trombone on "Friday's Dust" and "The Sulphur Man"
- Marc Bassey – trombone on "Friday's Dust" and "The Sulphur Man"
- Steve Waterman – trumpet and flugelhorn on "Friday's Dust" and "The Sulphur Man"
- Colin Crawley – tenor sax and flute on "Friday's Dust" and "The Sulphur Man"
- Duncan Ashby – clarinet on "Friday's Dust"
- Barrington Stewart, Fyza, Lisa Saddoo, and Joanne Watson – backing vocals on "Satellites"

== Charts ==
=== Weekly charts ===
Chart (2002)	Peak position
Australian Albums (ARIA)	17
French Albums (SNEP)	94
German Albums (Offizielle Top 100)	93
Irish Albums (IRMA)	2
New Zealand Albums (RMNZ)	34
Norwegian Albums (VG-lista)	11
Scottish Albums (Official Charts)	1
Swedish Albums (Sverigetopplistan)	49
UK Albums (Official Charts)	1
US Billboard 200	83

=== Year-end charts ===
Chart (2002)	Position
Canadian Alternative Albums (Nielsen SoundScan)	187
UK Albums (OCC)	72

== Certifications ==
Region	Certification	Certified units/sales
Ireland (IRMA)	Platinum	15,000^{^}
United Kingdom (BPI)	Platinum	300,000^{^}
^{^} Shipments figures based on certification alone.
