= Caught by the River =

2002 single by Doves

Single by Doves

from the album The Last Broadcast
- Released: 14 October 2002
- Length: 5:55 (album version); 4:18 (UK radio edit); 3:48 (US radio edit)
- Label: Heavenly
- Songwriter(s): Jez Williams, Jimi Goodwin, Andy Williams
- Producer(s): Doves, Steve Osborne

Doves singles chronology
"Pounding" (2002)	"Caught by the River" (2002)	"Black and White Town" (2005)

"Caught by the River" is the third single from English rock band Doves' second studio album, The Last Broadcast (2002). The single was released on 14 October 2002 in the UK and charted at number 29 on the UK Singles Chart. The music video was directed by David Mould.

An unknown quantity of the limited CD version (HVN126CDS, with fold-out poster insert) were mispressed and excluded the enhanced video track (even though the video track is listed on the CD sleeve) and contained only the 3 audio tracks. The B-side "Willow's Song" cuts out the intro and runs for 3:58. The full-length version (which includes a 'false start' and runs 4:20) can be found on the Japanese EP for "Pounding."

== Track listings ==
UK limited edition CD with fold-out poster (HVN126CDS)
No.	Title	Writer(s)	Length
1.	"Caught by the River"		5:55
2.	"Hit the Ground Running"	Zevon, Marinell, Wachtel	2:54
3.	"Willow's Song" (edit)	Traditional	3:58
4.	"Caught by the River" (Enhanced Video)

UK CD (HVN126CD)
No.	Title	Writer(s)	Length
1.	"Caught by the River"		5:55
2.	"Hit the Ground Running"	Zevon, Marinell, Wachtel	2:54
3.	"Willow's Song" (edit)	Traditional	3:58

UK 10-inch vinyl (HVN126-10)
No.	Title	Length
1.	"Caught by the River"	5:55
2.	"The Sulphur Man" (Rebelski Remix)	4:56
3.	"Where We're Calling From" (Hebden Bridge Remix)	6:43

== Charts ==
Chart (2002)	Peak position
Scotland (OCC)	29
UK Singles (OCC)	29
