= The Cedar Room =

2000 single by Doves

Single by Doves

from the album Lost Souls
- B-side: "Zither"; "Karen"
- Released: 20 March 2000
- Length: 7:38 (album version); 4:35 (radio edit)
- Label: Heavenly
- Songwriters: Jez Williams; Jimi Goodwin; Andy Williams
- Producer: Doves

Doves singles chronology
"The Cedar Room" (2000)	"Catch the Sun" (2000)

Music video
- "The Cedar Room" on YouTube

"The Cedar Room" is a song by English indie rock band Doves from their debut studio album, Lost Souls. It was released as the band's debut single on 20 March 2000, following three extended plays. The song charted at number 33 on the UK Singles Chart. "The Cedar Room" and B-side "Zither" made their first appearance on Doves' debut release Cedar EP. British publication NME named "The Cedar Room" as the 38th-best track of the 2000s.

== Track listings ==
All tracks are written by Jez Williams, Jimi Goodwin, and Andy Williams.

UK CD and 10-inch single
No.	Title	Length
1.	"The Cedar Room"	7:38
2.	"Zither"	2:32
3.	"Karen"	3:22

== Charts ==
Chart (2000)	Peak position
Scotland Singles (OCC)	37
UK Singles (OCC)	33
