= Sea EP =

EP by Doves
- Released: 24 May 1999
- Recorded: 1998
- Genre: Indie rock
- Length: 13:27
- Label: Casino Records
- Producer: Doves

Doves chronology
Cedar EP (1998)	Sea EP (1999)	Here It Comes (1999)

Music video
- "Sea Song" on YouTube

Sea EP is the second EP from Doves. It was self-released on the band's Casino Records label on 24 May 1999 on limited CD and 10" vinyl. The band dedicated the EP to Rob Gretton, who helped fund Doves' early releases as well as when the band played as Sub Sub. Rob died of a heart attack only a few days before the EP was released. In the music video for "Sea Song," the opening title card reads "For Rob."

== Track listing ==
All tracks are written by Jez Williams, Jimi Goodwin, and Andy Williams.

No.	Title	Length
1.	"Sea Song"	6:12
2.	"Break Me Gently" (Incidental)	1:24
3.	"Darker"	5:51

== Notes ==
- Casino Records CHIP002.
- All songs written and produced by Doves.
- Keyboards on "Sea Song" by Richard Wheatley.
- "Sea Song" engineered by Matt Ollivier.
- "Darker" engineered by Jez Williams.
- Sleeve design and artwork by Rick Myers.
