= There Goes the Fear =

2002 single by Doves

Single by Doves

from the album The Last Broadcast
- B-side: "Hit the Ground Running"
- Released: 15 April 2002
- Length: 6:54 (album version); 4:50 (radio edit)
- Label: Heavenly
- Songwriters: Jez Williams; Jimi Goodwin; Andy Williams
- Producer: Doves

Doves singles chronology
"The Man Who Told Everything" (2000)	"There Goes the Fear" (2002)	"Pounding" (2002)

Music video
- "There Goes the Fear" on YouTube

"There Goes the Fear" is the first single released from English alternative rock band Doves' second studio album, The Last Broadcast (2002). The single was released on 15 April 2002 in the UK on CD and 10-inch vinyl and charted at number three on the UK Singles Chart. Both formats were released and deleted on the same day. A single was also released for the song in Europe and Australia, featuring two live B-sides. In October 2011, NME placed the song at number 137 on its list of the "150 Best Tracks of the Past 15 Years".

== Background ==
When asked in a 2010 interview with Under the Radar as to why the single was released and deleted on the same day, Jez Williams stated, "It was to do something different from the norm. Just wanted to try something different really. I can't remember exactly whose idea it was. It might have been the manager's, but we were kind of into it. A kind of statement, in a way. We liked the fact that you could only get a hold of a certain amount of this or a certain amount of that. Especially in this day and age of readily available bits of music, it's kind of nice: a physical copy that's precious to you because you managed to get to the shop that day and actually own that."

B-side "Hit the Ground Running" is an adaptation of "Werewolves of London," written by Warren Zevon, Leroy Marinell, and Robert "Waddy" Wachtel.

== Music video ==
The music video for "There Goes the Fear," which was constructed entirely out of existing footage and won a D&AD award in 2003 for Outstanding Direction, was directed by Julian House and Julian Gibbs. The video was also included on the UK CD single release.

== Track listings ==
All tracks are written by Jez Williams, Jimi Goodwin, and Andy Williams, except where noted.

UK CD single
No.	Title	Length
1.	"There Goes the Fear"
2.	"There Goes the Fear" (enhanced video)

UK 10-inch single
No.	Title	Writer(s)	Length
1.	"There Goes the Fear"
2.	"Hit the Ground Running"	Zevon, Marinell, Wachtel

European and Australian CD single
No.	Title	Writer(s)	Length
1.	"There Goes the Fear"
2.	"Hit the Ground Running"	Zevon, Marinell, Wachtel
3.	"Here It Comes" (Triple J live at the Wireless)
4.	"The Cedar Room" (Triple J live at the Wireless)

== Personnel ==
=== Doves ===
- Jimi Goodwin – lead vocals, bass guitar, programming; additional drums (live versions only)
- Jez Williams – electric guitar, programming, backing vocals; agogo (live versions only)
- Andy Williams – drums, percussion

=== Additional musicians ===
- Marc Starr – percussion
- Chris Davies – percussion
- Billy Booth – percussion
- Richard Sliwa – percussion

== Charts ==
=== Weekly charts ===
Chart (2002)	Peak position
Europe (Eurochart Hot 100)	13
Ireland (IRMA)	27
Scottish Singles Sales (Official Charts)	2
UK Singles (Official Charts)	3

=== Year-end charts ===
Chart (2002)	Position
UK Singles (OCC)	195

== Certifications ==
Region	Certification	Certified units/sales
United Kingdom (BPI)	Silver	200,000^{‡}
^{‡} Sales+streaming figures based on certification alone.

== Release history ==
Region	Date	Format(s)	Label(s)	Ref(s).
United Kingdom	15 April 2002	10-inch vinyl; CD	Heavenly	
Australia	29 April 2002	CD	Heavenly	
United States	7 May 2002	Alternative; triple A radio	Capitol	
