= Odludek =

Studio album by Jimi Goodwin
- Released: 24 March 2014
- Recorded: 2012–2014
- Studio: Studio in Forest of Dean
- Genres: Rock, alternative pop
- Length: 42:37
- Label: Heavenly Recordings
- Producers: Jimi Goodwin and Dan Austin

Singles from Odludek
- 1. "Oh! Whiskey" Released: 24 March 2014; 2. "Live Like a River" Released: 30 June 2014; 3. "Lonely at the Drop" Released: 5 January 2015; 4. "Didsbury Girl (Tear Down Dub)" Released: 18 April 2015

Professional ratings
Review scores
Source	Rating
AllMusic	3.5/5 stars
Consequence of Sound	B
Drowned in Sound	6/10
musicOMH	3/5 stars
NME	7/10
The Observer	3/5 stars
PopMatters	7/10

Odludek is the debut solo album by Jimi Goodwin, released on Heavenly Recordings on 24 March 2014. The album follows a few years after his band, Doves, announced they were taking an "indefinite hiatus." The word odludek is a Polish word, meaning "pilgrim" or "loner." Goodwin wrote and played almost everything on Odludek himself, with only a handful of guest musicians, including Elbow frontman Guy Garvey and former Dungen member Fredrik Bjorling, and the album was recorded and co-produced with Dan Austin at a studio in the Forest of Dean across 18 months. Goodwin said, "Initially I wanted to have loads of guests on it. Maybe I wasn't trusting my own instincts because I'd collaborated in a band for such a long time, but that idea soon went out the window. Very quickly I decided I wanted to get my Prince head on and play everything. I became very protective of it. There was no-one steering me. I made it myself and paid for it myself, and that was very free and liberating."

Odludek spawned four promotional-only singles; second single "Live Like a River" was given a commercial release on 12" vinyl, featuring exclusive remixes of the title track and album opener "Terracotta Warrior". A dub remix of "Didsbury Girl" was released as a vinyl single for Record Store Day 2015.

== Track listing ==
All tracks are written by Jimi Goodwin unless stated.

No.	Title	Writer(s)	Length
1.	"Terracotta Warrior"		4:46
2.	"Didsbury Girl"	Goodwin, Simon Dine	5:26
3.	"Live Like a River"		3:08
4.	"Hope"	Goodwin, Guy Garvey	4:29
5.	"Man V Dingo"	Goodwin, Garvey, Brian Fahey	4:52
6.	"Keep My Soul in Song"	Goodwin, Steve Martin	3:50
7.	"Oh! Whiskey"		5:20
8.	"The Ghost of the Empties"		3:56
9.	"Lonely at the Drop"	Goodwin, Henri Texier	4:10
10.	"Panic Tree"	Goodwin, Garvey	2:36

== Charts ==
Chart (2014)	Peak position
UK Albums Chart	39
