= Black Rivers =

English rock band

Black Rivers are an English rock band composed of twin brothers Jez and Andy Williams, who form two-thirds of the bands Sub Sub and Doves.

== History ==
Jez Williams and Andy Williams are multi-instrumentalists in the band Doves, which went on hiatus following their 2009 album Kingdom of Rust. As a duo, they began working on music again in 2012, recording in Andy's home studio in Glasgow, Jez's home studio in Salford, and in an Anglesey cottage. In summer 2014, Black Rivers began playing live shows with new material, and in February 2015 released their debut self-titled album.

== Discography ==
Studio albums

- Black Rivers (Ignition Records, 9 February 2015) UK #35

Singles

- "The Ship" (25 July 2014)
- "Voyager 1" (27 October 2014)
- "The Forest" (9 February 2015)
- "Age of Innocence" (18 May 2015)
- Black Rivers Remix EP (13 November 2015)
