= Rob's Records =

- Founder: Rob Gretton
- Genre: Post-punk, dance
- Country of origin: United Kingdom
- Location: Manchester, England

Rob's Records was a British, Manchester-based independent record label founded by Rob Gretton, former manager of Joy Division and New Order, and a co-director of Factory Records.

Their first release in 1989 was the single "Security" by the US-based band the Beat Club, with a remix by Bernard Sumner of New Order. The label went on to release a series of dance records by local groups such as Sub Sub, Mr Scruff, A Certain Ratio and Digital Justice, as well international acts including the Beat Club and Roy Davis Jr.

In 1993, "Ain't No Love (Ain't No Use)" by Sub Sub hit No. 3 on the UK Singles Chart, providing the label with its biggest commercial success.

The label ceased operations shortly after Gretton's death on 15 May 1999.

== See also ==
- List of record labels
