= Martin Rebelski =

British musician (born 1974)

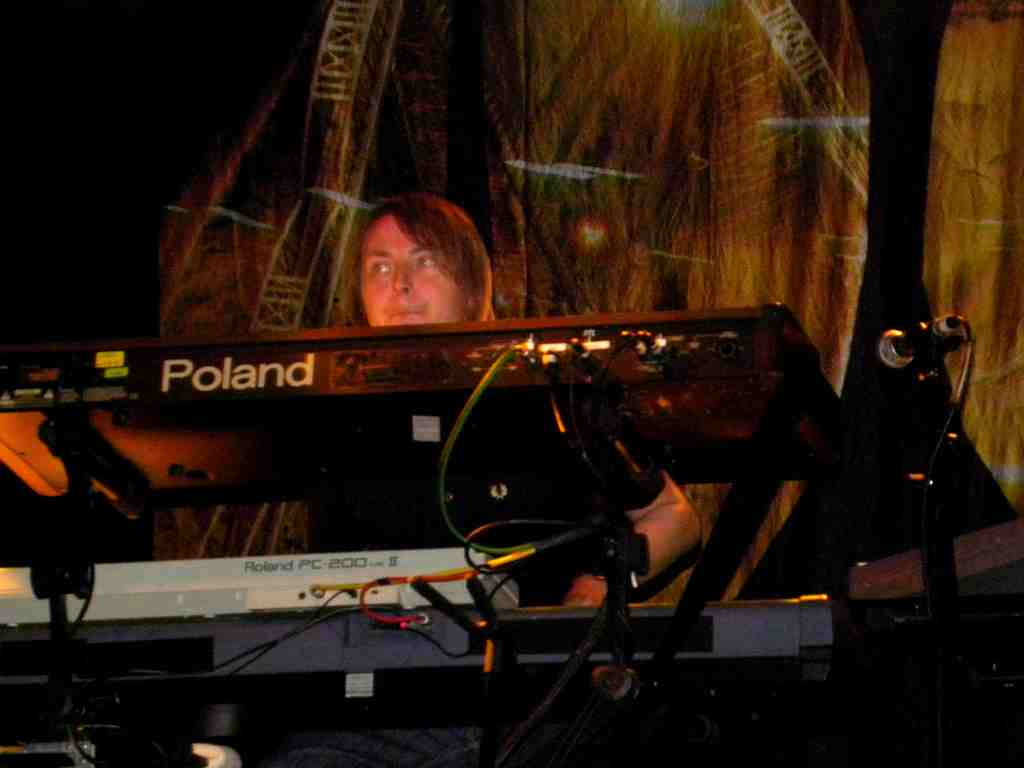
- Rebelski performing with Doves in 2009

Background information
- Born: Martin Roman Rebelski; 26 September 1974 (age 52); Leamington Spa, Warwickshire, England
- Genres: Indie rock; ambient
- Occupation: Musician
- Instruments: Keyboards; piano
- Years active: 1998 – present
- Labels: Twisted Nerve; Heavenly
- Member of: Doves (touring); Peter Hook and The Light
- Website: www.rebelski.com

Martin Roman Rebelski (born 26 September 1974) is a British musician who is the touring keyboardist for the British indie rock band Doves, acting as the band's unofficial fourth member. As a composer and recording artist in his own right, Rebelski has also released two instrumental solo albums: Thanks for Your Thoughts on Heavenly Records in 2003, and Stickers on Keys on Twisted Nerve Records in 2004.

== Career ==
Rebelski acts as Doves unofficial fourth member. Rebelski was recommended by a friend of Rob Gretton to play as a session musician for Doves, but soon became the band's touring keyboard player. In addition to playing with Doves on tour, Rebelski has also played on all of the band's albums.

Rebelski produced and released his first single "Scarecrow," which was sold at Doves' shows in late winter 2002, and his debut album Thanks for Your Thoughts arrived in March 2003. Rebelski's debut solo live performance was as support for Doves at the band's 27 March gig at the Royal Albert Hall, a benefit for the Teenage Cancer trust. Following a recommendation from Damon Gough, Rebelski signed to Twisted Nerve Records, and recorded his second solo album Stickers on Keys. The album was released in November 2004 to warm critical reception. Rebelski parted ways with Twisted Nerve as his third studio album was ready for release in summer 2007.

In late 2008, Rebelski scored the soundtrack to the short film The Value of Hard Work. Also, Rebelski is credited as composer for some of the music included in the BBC 'ecodocumentary': Around the World in 60 Minutes, narrated by David Morrissey and first broadcast on BBC Four on Monday 14 March 2011. Rebelski is also a touring member of Peter Hook and the Light and Echo and the Bunnymen

In September 2023, Rebelski released a minimalist instrumental piano album called Simplicity.

Rebelski is half-Polish, and the letter 'R' on his Roland keyboard is covered to make the letter 'P' to read "Poland."

== Discography ==
=== Albums ===
- Thanks for Your Thoughts (3 March 2003)
  - Heavenly Records HVNLP40CD
  - Aporia Records APCD-021 (North American release, 10 July 2007)
  1. "Three" – 4:25
  2. "Scarecrow" – 3:50
  3. "Unlikely Tale" – 4:34
  4. "The Swarm" – 4:17
  5. "Walkie Talkie" – 3:55
  6. "Toy Shop" – 2:29
  7. "Tiddlywink" – 4:44
  8. "Dad's Hi-Fi" – 3:30
- Stickers on Keys (29 November 2004)
  - Twisted Nerve Records TN 059 CD
  - Aporia Records APCD-022 (North American release, 10 July 2007)
  1. "Alka Seltzer" – 4:32
  2. "In Space for a Day" – 1:53
  3. "Stickers on Keys" – 4:23
  4. "Little White Lights" – 4:01
  5. "Remote Control" – 4:46
  6. "Long, Slow Drive Home" – 3:49
  7. "As the Crow Flies" – 2:28
  8. "Play the School Piano" – 4:58
  9. "Scallywag" – 4:50
  10. "Magic Calculator" – 3:01

=== Singles ===
- "Scarecrow" (2002, Heavenly Records HVN118)
  1. "Scarecrow"
  2. "Dad's Hi-Fi"
- "Play the School Piano" (15 November 2004, Twisted Nerve TN 058)
  - 7" vinyl:
    1. "Play the School Piano"
    2. "Everything a Pound"
  - Promo CD-R single:
    1. "Play the School Piano"
    2. "Everything a Pound"
    3. "Two Cans and a Piece of String"
- "Little White Lights" (6 June 2005, Twisted Nerve TN 061)
  - 7" vinyl:
    1. "Little White Lights"
    2. "Birdhouse"
  - CD single:
    1. "Little White Lights"
    2. "Birdhouse"
    3. "Egg and Spoon Race"

== Soundtracks ==
- The Value of Hard Work (2009)
- Anna and the Witch's Bottle (by Geoff Cox, Rohan Daniel Eason, and Martin Roman Rebelski) (September 2009)

== Remixes ==
- Doves, "The Sulphur Man" (Rebelski Remix)
  - First appeared on "Caught by the River" single, October 2002; later issued on the bonus disc for Lost Sides, September 2003
- Doves, "The Storm" (Rebelski Remix)
  - First appeared on "Sky Starts Falling" single, September 2005
