= Sub Sub =

English musical group

- Origin: Handforth, Cheshire, England
- Genres: House, EDM, alternative dance, Madchester
- Years active: 1991–1996
- Label: Rob's Records
- Spinoffs: Doves
- Past members: Jez Williams; Jimi Goodwin; Andy Williams

Sub Sub were an English dance act from Handforth, Cheshire composed of Jimi Goodwin and twin brothers Andy and Jez Williams.

== History ==
The threesome met at school in 1985 and became regulars at The Haçienda while composing their own material together. They had an underground 12" single ("Space Face" in 1991) and moderate commercial success in the early 1990s on Rob Gretton's label Rob's Records, including the single "Ain't No Love (Ain't No Use)" (featuring guest vocalist Melanie Williams) which reached No. 3 on the UK Singles Chart. The trio's only album, Full Fathom Five, was released in September 1994.

After a fire destroyed their recording studio on Blossom Street in the Ancoats area of Manchester on the Williams twins' birthday in 1996, they started as the more indie-oriented act Doves in 1998. An unreleased collection of tracks meant to be featured on the band's second album was issued in 1998 as Delta Tapes.

== Discography ==
=== Albums ===
List of albums, with selected chart positions
Title	Album details	Peak chart positions
Title	Album details	AUS
Full Fathom Five	Released: September 1994; Label: Rob's Records	159
Delta Tapes	Released: February 1998; Label: Cortex Records	—

=== Singles ===
Year	Single	Peak chart positions					Album
Year	Single	UK	AUS	BEL (FL)	IRE	NED	Album
1991	"Space Face"	—	—	—	—	—	Single only
1992	Coast EP	—	—	—	—	—	Full Fathom Five
1993	"Ain't No Love (Ain't No Use)" (feat. Melanie Williams)	3	11	47	13	18	Full Fathom Five
1994	"Respect"	49	104	—	—	—	Full Fathom Five
1994	"Angel"	88	198	—	—	—	Full Fathom Five
1995	"Southern Trees"	—	—	—	—	—	Full Fathom Five
1996	"Smoking Beagles" (with Tricky)	—	—	—	—	—	Delta Tapes
1997	"This Time I'm Not Wrong" (with Bernard Sumner)	78	—	—	—	—	Delta Tapes
"—" denotes releases that did not chart or were not released.
