= Doves (band) =

English alternative rock band

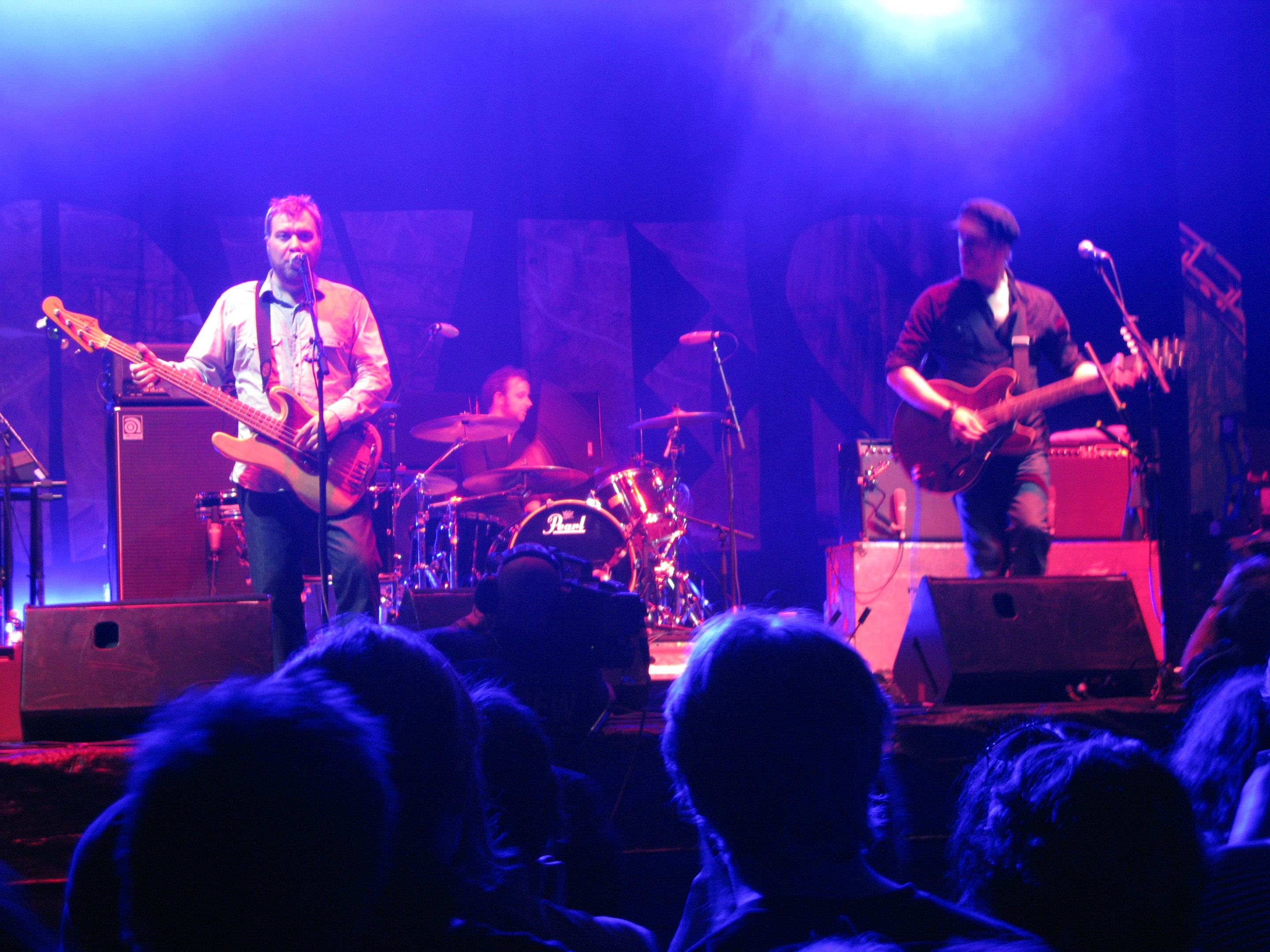
- Doves performing live in 2009. From left to right: Jimi Goodwin, Andy Williams (on drums), and Jez Williams.

Background information
- Origin: Wilmslow, Cheshire, England
- Genres: Indie rock; post-Britpop; pop rock; space rock; Britpop
- Years active: 1998–2010, 2018–present
- Labels: Heavenly; Virgin/EMI
- Spinoffs: Black Rivers
- Spinoff of: Sub Sub
- Members: Jimi Goodwin; Jez Williams; Andy Williams

Doves are an English indie rock band formed in 1998, from Wilmslow, Cheshire. The band is composed of singer and bassist Jimi Goodwin and twin brothers, guitarist Jez and drummer Andy Williams.

The band released six studio albums between 2000 and 2025, three of which reached number one on the UK albums chart. The band also achieved two top-ten singles in the UK: "There Goes the Fear" (number three in 2002) and "Black and White Town" (number six in 2005).

The trio was previously Sub Sub, a dance act with a 1993 hit. As Doves, they released their debut album Lost Souls in 2000, which was nominated for the Mercury Prize. Further success followed with their second album The Last Broadcast, which was their first UK number-one record.

Doves entered a hiatus in 2010 after four albums as Goodwin began a solo career while the Williams brothers regrouped as Black Rivers. The band reformed in 2018, performing shows in 2019 and releasing a new album, The Universal Want, in 2020. Because of mental health issues, Goodwin has not performed live with the band since 2019.

== History ==
=== Formation as Sub Sub (1991–1998) ===
The Williams brothers and Goodwin met at Wilmslow High School at age 15. Whilst the Williams brothers grew up in Wilmslow, Goodwin grew up in Altrincham, Cheshire.

All three members played in various local bands during the timeframe, with their paths occasionally crossing. After meeting again at The Haçienda in 1989, the three formed Sub Sub, releasing their first single "Space Face" in 1991. In 1993 they released "Ain't No Love (Ain't No Use)," which reached number three in the UK singles chart. On the Williams twins' birthday in February 1996, the band's Ancoats studio caught fire and burned down, leading the band members to abandon their previous dance-oriented style and start afresh as alternative rock band Doves in 1998. On the band's change of direction, Jez Williams said: "We were faced with a really black and white decision: throw the towel in or carry on. And if you're going to carry on, you've got to put everything into it to justify it, because before that you've lost everything. That was quite a liberating feeling, actually."

=== Lost Souls and The Last Broadcast (1998–2003) ===
The band released three EPs in 1998 and 1999 on Casino Records, a subsidiary of Rob Gretton's Rob's Records, which established the group's new sound and met with a warm critical response. Their debut album Lost Souls in April 2000 was nominated for the Mercury Music Prize, which they lost to fellow Mancunian and former collaborator Badly Drawn Boy.

Doves' second album The Last Broadcast was released two years later, reaching number one on the UK albums chart, and was again nominated for the Mercury Music Prize. The album's first single "There Goes the Fear" became the band's highest-charting single to date, reaching number three on the UK singles chart despite only being released for one day before it was deleted. The album's second single "Pounding" reached number 21 on the singles chart and was used in the Vancouver 2010 Winter Olympics With Glowing Hearts/Des Plus Brillants Exploits advertisement campaign and in pre-event intros.

In 2003, the band released a B-sides compilation, Lost Sides, and a DVD entitled Where We're Calling From. The DVD included all of their music videos to date, as well as incidental videos played before the start of their Lost Souls and The Last Broadcast tours. Also on the DVD was a live concert video of the band's gig at Cornwall's Eden Project, recorded in Summer 2002, as well as documentary videos about Doves as well as Sub Sub.

=== Some Cities and Kingdom of Rust (2003–2009) ===
Doves recorded Some Cities, their third studio album, away from urban influences, and in cottages tucked away in the countryside of Snowdonia, Darlington, and around Loch Ness. "Lyrically, the theme of cities and towns and change started cropping up a lot... which was strange because we were recording and writing in the countryside, but it started taking this real urban shape," said Jimi Goodwin. Some Cities was released in February 2005 and went straight to number one in the UK albums chart, aided by some of the strongest reviews they had received to date. The album was preceded by the single "Black and White Town," which reached number six on the singles chart. On 18 June 2005, the band opened for U2 at Twickenham Stadium in London. They also supported Oasis at the City of Manchester Stadium on their triumphant return to Manchester, and Coldplay at the Reebok Stadium in Bolton, both during their respective 2005 tours.

The band's fourth album, Kingdom of Rust, was released in April 2009. Prior to the new release, Doves offered a free download of the album's lead track "Jetstream" on their website. On 27 January 2009 the band announced a week's worth of tour dates from 12–19 March, in which new album tracks made their debuts. The eleven songs on the album were described by Jez Williams as "schizophrenic, but... also strangely cohesive." The band have subsequently stated that writing and recording the album was the most difficult and fractious of their career. Worldwide tours, including multiple tours of the United Kingdom, United States and Canada, followed the album's release. On 12 July 2009 the band appeared on the BBC Radio 1 stage at T in the Park and the festival Latitude in Southwold. They also appeared with the London Bulgarian Choir as part of the BBC Electric Proms series in October 2009.

The band's first best of compilation, entitled The Places Between: The Best of Doves was released on 5 April 2010.

An interview with the band regarding their history and Jodrell Bank performance was posted on The Guardian's website on 4 April 2010. Doves toured the UK throughout May 2010, and performed at the Isle of Wight Festival 2010.

=== Hiatus and side projects (2010–2018) ===
The band took a break from recording in 2010, according to an interview with The Daily Record. Jimi Goodwin stated: "It's nice just to have a bit of breathing space... We just wanted to get off that whole album-tour-album-tour treadmill. None of us are ready to face going into the studio for another two years. This is wiping the slate clean, we have nothing else in the vaults now. That is it. Whatever we do from now on will be a new start."

On 2 October 2012, EMI International released a Doves anthology titled 5 Album Set featuring all four studio albums from Lost Souls to Kingdom of Rust and the 2003 re-issue of Lost Sides.

In March 2014, Jimi Goodwin released his first solo album, entitled Odludek. Jez and Andy Williams began working on music again in 2012, recording in Andy's home studio in Glasgow, Jez's home studio in Salford, and in an Anglesey cottage. In summer 2014, their project was announced under the name Black Rivers, who began playing live shows with new material, and in February 2015 released a self-titled album.

=== Reformation, The Universal Want and Constellations for the Lonely (2018–present) ===
At the end of 2018 the band members announced a series of gigs for 2019 and a tentative plan to explore new music together. As the series neared conclusion, Doves posted on Facebook that the 31 August 2019 and 6 September 2019 shows would be the last two concerts until they completed their new album.

On 18 June 2020, the band released their first new music in ten years with a song entitled "Carousels". It and "Prisoners", released on 9 July, are from their new album, The Universal Want, which was released on 11 September 2020 and charted at number 1 in its first week. In October 2021, the band cancelled their upcoming tour due to Goodwin's mental health, making a statement that "performing live isn't possible for us at this time or in the immediate future".

On 4 November 2024, the band released a new single, "Renegade", alongside the announcement of their sixth studio album Constellations for the Lonely, which was eventually released on 28 February 2025. On 8 November, three "intimate" shows were announced for later in the month, with Goodwin not participating due to his mental health; the Williams brothers will share vocals alongside an expanded touring band. Doves later announced a tour in support of the album, without Goodwin and with the current touring band, for 2025.

=== 2026: momentum ===
Doves supported fellow Mancunian band James on their 2026 Love Is The Answer tour. Doves headlined a Manchester City trophy event at the Co-Op Live on the 24th of May 2026 marking a year that featured several Manchester concerts that included the Aviva Studios (twice) and the Manchester Apollo. London's Regent's Park features as a venue in September 2026, alongside Kendal Calling, Big Feastival and Victorious Festival.

=== Live 4 City ===
Doves have shared an association with Manchester City, having played Maine Road's last game, the City of Manchester Stadium car park (17th July 2009: Live 4 City gig), title parades, guest-edited a matchday programme, chosen matchday music for a Champions League game, and performed at City Live (as Black Rivers). Doves created a tune exclusively for Manchester City called Live 4 City based on the tune of their song Words.

== Band members ==
- Jimi Goodwin – lead vocals, bass guitar, acoustic guitar, sampler, occasional drums
- Jez Williams – guitar, lead and backing vocals, percussion, programming
- Andy Williams – drums, lead and backing vocals, percussion, harmonica, melodica, sampler

Touring musicians

- Martin Rebelski – keyboards (1998–present)
- Nathan Sudders – bass (2024–present)
- Jake Evans – guitar, drums, backing vocals (2024–present)

== Discography ==
Studio albums

- Lost Souls (2000)
- The Last Broadcast (2002)
- Some Cities (2005)
- Kingdom of Rust (2009)
- The Universal Want (2020)
- Constellations for the Lonely (2025)
