= Jez Williams =

British musician (born 1970)

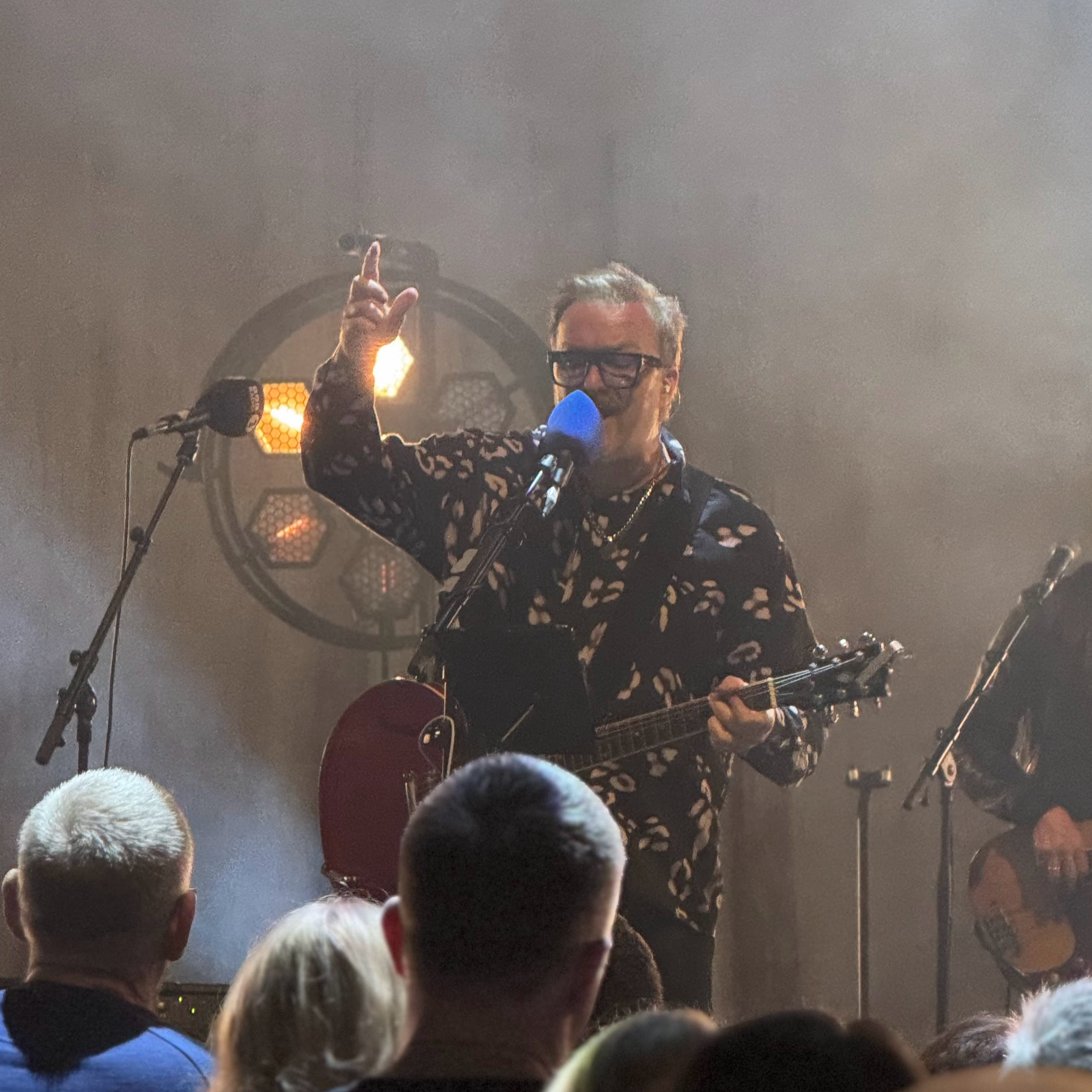
- Jez Williams performing in 2025

Background information
- Born: Jeremy Francis Williams; 18 February 1970 (age 56); Manchester, England
- Genre: Indie rock
- Occupations: Musician; songwriter
- Instruments: Vocals; guitar; synthesiser; bass; piano; organ; percussion; melodica
- Years active: 1985–present
- Label: Heavenly
- Member of: Doves
- Formerly of: Sub Sub; Black Rivers
- Website: Doves' official website

Jeremy Francis Williams (born 18 February 1970) is a British musician who is the guitarist and co-songwriter of the British indie rock band Doves. He was born in Manchester, England, and is the twin brother of bandmate Andy and the son of noted modernist architect Desmond Williams. Before their incarnation as Doves, the three members were a dance-club music trio called Sub Sub.

His earlier bands include Metro Trinity, whose first EP called "Die Young" was released in 1987 on Cafetieria Records, based in Hulme, Manchester. Members also included Tim Whiteley, Colin Rocks, Pete Zichovitch and Jonny Male, who later became the main songwriter/guitarist in the band Republica. Williams played guitar on Republica's debut album Republica.

While Doves were on a hiatus between 2010 and 2020, Jez and Andy formed a side project called Black Rivers, releasing a self-titled album in February 2015.

As well as playing guitar, Jez sings backing vocals and also takes lead vocals on some songs; the chorus of "Rise" from Lost Souls, the B-side "Your Shadow Lay Across My Life", "Words" from The Last Broadcast, "The Storm" from Some Cities, "Jetstream" and "Compulsion" from Kingdom of Rust and "Mother Silverlake" from The Universal Want.

Jez and his brother Andy are both Manchester City fans.
