= Jimi Goodwin =

British musician (born 1970)

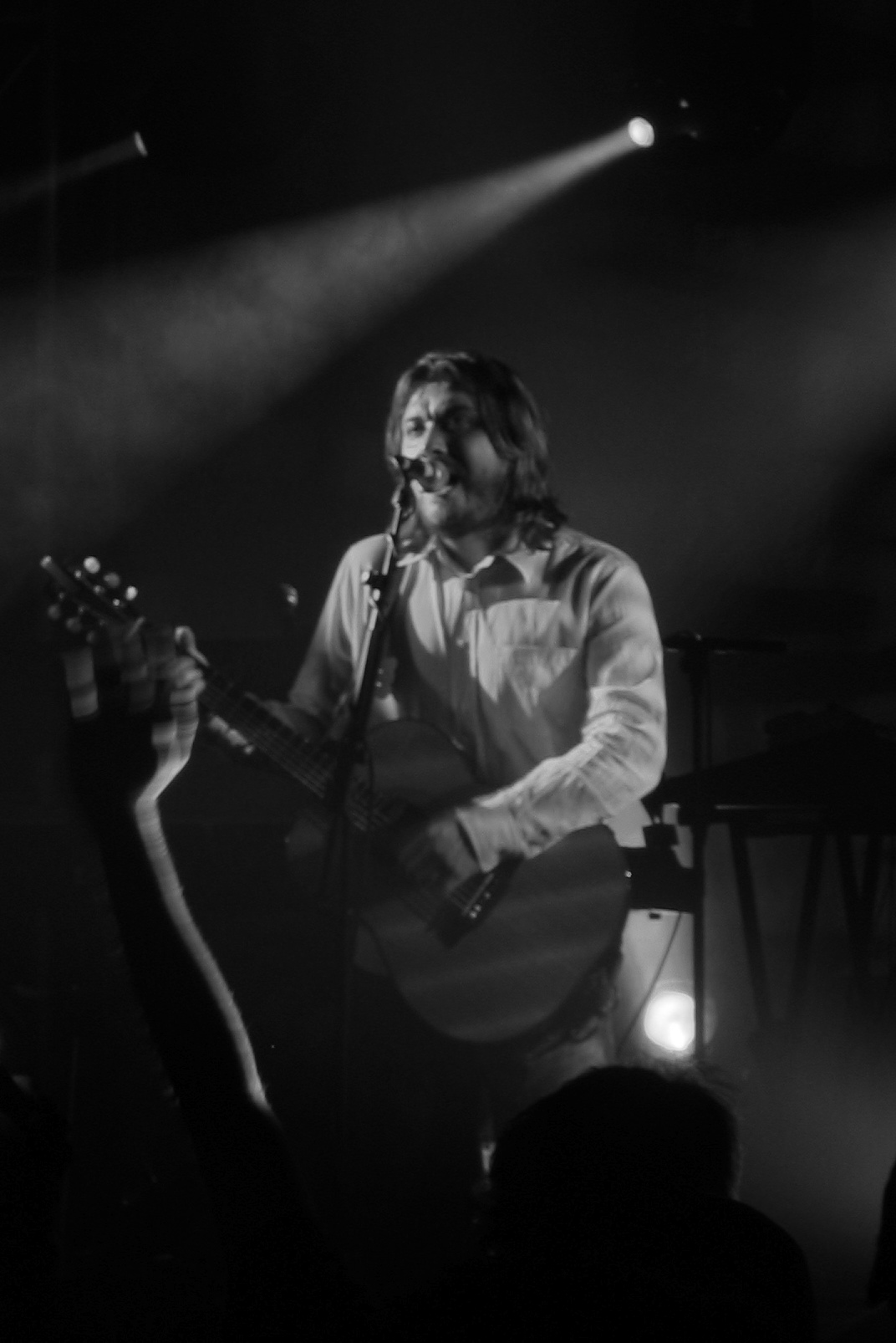
- Jimi Goodwin at the Manchester Ritz.

Background information
- Born: Jamie Francis Alexander Goodwin; 28 May 1970 (age 56); Manchester, England
- Genre: Indie rock
- Occupations: Musician; songwriter
- Instruments: Vocals; bass guitar; guitar; drums; percussion; bouzouki; harmonica; Appalachian dulcimer
- Years active: 1985–present
- Label: Heavenly
- Member of: Doves
- Formerly of: Sub Sub
- Website: http://jimigoodwin.com/

Jamie Francis Alexander Goodwin (born 28 May 1970) is a British musician who is the bassist, co-vocalist and guitarist for the British indie rock band Doves. Before their incarnation as Doves, he and other Doves members were in a house music group, Sub Sub.

== Career ==
=== Doves ===
Goodwin is best known as the lead singer, bassist, and guitarist for Doves, but in songs like "Here It Comes", he is known for swapping positions with drummer Andy Williams and taking over as drummer. During live performances of "There Goes the Fear", he is known for adding an extra drum solo to the end of the song. Goodwin is left-handed, but whilst playing live uses a right-handed bass strung in the normal tuning and flipped upside down.

Goodwin has not performed live with the band since 2019 due to mental health issues.

=== Solo projects ===
On the second episode in season ten of RTÉ's Other Voices programme, Goodwin played two new songs, "Panic Tree" and "Didsbury Girl" featuring Cherry Ghost.

Goodwin released his first solo studio album titled Odludek on 24 March 2014, and toured to promote the album as a supporting act of friends Elbow.

In 2024, Goodwin released the album Mala Leche under the alias NightjaR. An album of hip-hop influenced beats, featuring guest appearances by Pan Amsterdam, Jason Williamson and Homeboy Sandman. The Project was performed live at Manchester's Band on The Wall in August, 2025.

=== Collaborations ===
Goodwin joined Bernard Sumner and Johnny Marr's band Electronic to play bass on their 1999 third album, Twisted Tenderness. He had previously appeared in the video for the band's single "For You" from their 1996 album Raise the Pressure although Marr is credited with playing bass on this album.

Goodwin contributed guitar work to the song "Heaven" on Lamb's 2001 album, What Sound. This song was later used by HBO during the second season of American television drama series Six Feet Under, and also appears on the Six Feet Under soundtrack.

While acting as a guest host on a BBC Radio One show in 2005, Goodwin featured his friend and up-and-coming musician Simon Aldred (Cherry Ghost), who performed a live acoustic set. Then, in 2007, Goodwin played bass and drums on Cherry Ghost's debut single "Mathematics" and their song "People Help the People". Goodwin contributed vocals to the song "Kingdoms of Rain" on the Soulsavers and Mark Lanegan album It's Not How Far You Fall, It's the Way You Land in 2007. Doves and Soulsavers have worked together previously in various forms, as Soulsavers remixed Doves' song "Satellites", which appeared on the "Pounding" single in 2002.

In an interview with the Daily Record, Goodwin stated that Doves would take a break from recording. In the time following the band's 2010 touring to support The Places Between: The Best of Doves, Goodwin revealed that he had been hoping to collaborate with friend and Elbow lead singer Guy Garvey after talking about recording songs together for years. "There are a couple of tracks that we have passed back and forwards to each other but it's having the time. We keep trying to get our diaries together, who knows if it will ever get released. I'm just waiting to see what might happen." Goodwin and Garvey had collaborated in the past, with each musician's respective band. Goodwin contributed backing vocals to "Grace Under Pressure" on Elbow's 2003 album Cast of Thousands, while Garvey sang backing vocals on "Snowden" and "Almost Forgot Myself" on Doves' 2005 album Some Cities.

== Personal life ==
In 1985, Goodwin was playing lead guitar in a band called the Risk, which included his cousin Pat Goodwin on drums. Goodwin's mother died while Doves were recording their third album Some Cities. Doves' fourth studio album Kingdom of Rust is dedicated to Goodwin's father, Francis James Goodwin, who died aged 65 on 23 December 2008.

In the booklet for the Clash's 2007 compilation album The Singles, the page discussing the track "I Fought the Law" features commentary from Goodwin. He cites his father for introducing him to punk rock and the Clash:

I was an eight-year-old punk when the Cost of Living EP came out. My dad was well into his music and for my birthday present he took me to see the Clash at the Apollo in Manchester. I can still remember seeing the sign outside as we arrived: 'LIVE TONIGHT – THE CLASH.' Joe Strummer was totally wired, throwing his guitar around the stage. We were sitting in the balcony and by the end the whole place was going crazy. Seats were getting ripped out and flying everywhere. My old man was like, 'We'd better get you out of here.' The first line of "I Fought the Law" is the killer: "Breaking rocks in the hot sun." Fucking brilliant. After that you can do anything. ...It's a great track, but then the Clash always did brilliant covers... I've still got my dad's vinyl copy of the first album. I dug it out the other day. As a kid, I'd written all over it in crayon: 'Jimi Goodwin – Punk Rock Lives!' The seeds of everything I've done since were sown there, I reckon!
