= Andy Williams (drummer) =

British musician (born 1970)

- Born: Andrew Sebastian Williams; 18 February 1970 (age 56); Manchester, England
- Genre: Indie rock
- Occupations: Musician; songwriter
- Instruments: Vocals; drums; percussion; keyboard; melodica; synthesiser; harmonica
- Years active: 1985–present
- Label: Heavenly
- Member of: Doves
- Formerly of: Sub Sub; Black Rivers
- Website: Doves' official website

Andrew Sebastian Williams (born 18 February 1970) is a British musician who is the drummer and co-vocalist of the British indie rock band Doves. He is the son of noted modernist architect Desmond Williams and the twin brother of bandmate Jez. Andy and Jez were born in Manchester, England and have a brother Dominic and sister Sarah.

Before forming Doves, the band's three members were a dance-club music trio called Sub Sub.

While Doves were on a hiatus between 2010 and 2018, Andy and Jez Williams formed a side project called Black Rivers, releasing a self-titled album in February 2015.

Andy sings occasional backing vocals and also lead vocals on some songs; "Rise", "Melody Calls" and the verses of "Here It Comes" from Lost Souls, "M62 Song" from The Last Broadcast, the B-sides "Hit the Ground Running", "45" (verses) & "At The Tower" (chorus), "Shadows of Salford" from Some Cities and the verses of "Blue Water" from the special edition of The Places Between: The Best of Doves.

Andy plays the harmonica on several tracks, as well as the melodica during live acoustic versions of "Snowden" and "N.Y."

Andy and his brother Jez are both Manchester City fans.
