= Heavenly Recordings =

English independent record label

Coordinates: 51.5128°N 0.1324°W

- Founded: 1990
- Founder: Jeff Barrett
- Distributor: PIAS Group
- Genre: Indie rock
- Country of origin: UK
- Official website: heavenlyrecordings.com

Heavenly Recordings is a London-based independent record label founded by Jeff Barrett in 1990. Heavenly released the first albums from Saint Etienne, Beth Orton and Doves, and early singles by Manic Street Preachers. Current Heavenly artists include Mattiel, The Orielles, Confidence Man, audiobooks, Pip Blom, H. Hawkline, Gwenno Saunders, Amber Arcades, Tapir!, Working Men's Club, Katy J Pearson, CHAI and Kneecap.

Heavenly won Independent Label of the Year at the 2015 Music Week Awards. Other achievements include a Mercury Prize nomination for Saint Etienne's debut album, Foxbase Alpha, and three number 1 albums with Doves. It is considered a key British indie record label, alongside Factory, Creation, Rough Trade, Mute, Ninja Tune and Domino.

== History ==
=== 1980s: pre-Heavenly ===
In the early 1980s, Jeff Barrett was a record shop manager and live music promoter living in Plymouth. He put on early gigs by The Jesus and Mary Chain, Primal Scream, The Loft and The Pastels, all bands signed to Creation Records, and Creation founder Alan McGee soon offered Barrett a job at the label. Jeff became Creation's first full-time employee, in the summer of 1985, and worked there until 1988, when he left to set up Capersville press agency. Capersville represented several Creation bands, as well as representing Factory Records and all their artists (including Happy Mondays and New Order), The KLF and Inspiral Carpets. At the same time, Barrett was putting on gigs and club nights in London and set up two short-lived record labels – Head and Sub-Aqua – who released records by Loop, East Village and Laugh. Then in 1990, in partnership with his former record shop boss Mike Chadwick, Barrett set up Heavenly.

=== 1990s and 2000s ===
The first Heavenly release was a 12-inch single by London house act Sly & Lovechild, produced by Andrew Weatherall. This was followed by the debut singles from Saint Etienne ("Only Love Can Break Your Heart") and Flowered Up ("It's On"); both became key tracks in the UK house scene.

Next, Heavenly signed Manic Street Preachers and released two singles, "Motown Junk" in January 1991 and "You Love Us" in May 1991. The Manics then signed to Columbia Records for their first album.

Meanwhile, Flowered Up had made one album with London Records but returned to Heavenly in 1992 for their classic 13-minute single, "Weekender." Saint Etienne's debut album, Foxbase Alpha, was shortlisted for the 1992 Mercury Prize.

Over the next few years, Heavenly signed and released records by The Rockingbirds, Flowered Up, Beth Orton, The Hybirds, Monkey Mafia, Dot Allison, Q-Tee and Espiritu. Colleague and friend Martin Kelly became a partner in the label, as well as manager of Saint Etienne. Beth Orton's first album, Trailer Park, was nominated for two Brit Awards and for the 1997 Mercury Prize. Orton won a Brit for her second album, Central Reservation, in 2000.

In 2000, Heavenly signed Doves, as well as 22-20s, Cherry Ghost, Edwyn Collins and Ed Harcourt. Doves had four platinum albums in a row: Lost Souls (2000), The Last Broadcast (2002), Some Cities (2005), and Kingdom of Rust (2009). The Last Broadcast and Some Cities gave Heavenly its first UK Number 1 albums.

In 2004, the label signed The Magic Numbers, whose self-titled debut became Heavenly's bestselling album ever. The album was Mercury-nominated in 2005, and band were nominated for Best British Newcomer at the 2006 Brit Awards.

=== 2010–present ===
Heavenly signed Stealing Sheep and Toy in 2011; both bands released their debuts the following year. This marked the start of another halcyon period for Heavenly.

In 2012, the label released the debut single from Temples, "Shelter Song." In 2013, they signed Mark Lanegan and Duke Garwood for their collaborative album Black Pudding; both artists are now signed to Heavenly individually. Temples' debut album Sun Structures, released in 2014, was Heavenly's 100th album release, a UK Top 10 hit and Rough Trade's Number 1 Album of the Year.

In 2014 and 2015, in the run-up to their 25th anniversary, the label signed and released albums by The Wytches, Gwenno, Eaves, Drinks, H. Hawkline, Hooton Tennis Club, Kid Wave, King Gizzard & the Lizard Wizard and Fever The Ghost.

In April 2015, Jeff Barrett and Heavenly right-hand man Danny Mitchell accepted the Music Week Awards prize for Best Independent Record Company.

In 2017, King Gizzard & the Lizard Wizard released five critically acclaimed full-length albums; Flying Microtonal Banana, Murder of the Universe, Sketches of Brunswick East, Polygondwanaland, and Gumboot Soup, all on Heavenly. Pitchfork described the releases as "musically and ideologically dense albums [...] showing a new dedication to pop craftsmanship." The Quietus said that each album "offered up something radical and conceptually full-blown. Much better still, they all delivered on quality."

In 2016, the label released Fading Lines by Dutch singer Amber Arcades. Since then, Heavenly releases include: Baxter Dury's Prince of Tears, described by The Quietus as "beautiful, heart-rending, sexy, repulsive"; Gwenno's second album, Le Kov, sung entirely in Cornish and made Album of the Year lists in The Guardian, Mojo and Rough Trade; the debut album from David Wrench's new band audiobooks; Stealing Sheep's "bold, voltaic" third album, Big Wows; and Pip Blom's debut, Boat.

In 2019, Heavenly signed Working Men's Club, Katy J Pearson and Raf Rundell.

In May 2023, Heavenly signed indie folk band Tapir!.

Heavenly won Best Independent Label at the 2024 AIM Independent Music Awards.

== Affiliations ==
=== The Social ===
In 1999 The Social opened in central London near Oxford Circus, named for the Heavenly Sunday Social nights which Heavenly ran with The Chemical Brothers (then known as The Dust Brothers) at the Albany pub in Great Portland Street in 1994. As of 2019, The Social was still an independent live venue, preparing to celebrate its 30th year after fighting off threat of a buyout.

Audiobooks, The Chemical Brothers, and Beck have played at The Social. It also hosts regular literary readings, often in collaboration with Faber & Faber. The Social also runs the Stonebridge Bar at Glastonbury Festival.

=== Caught by the River ===
In 2007, Barrett set up Caught By The River with Robin Turner and Andrew Walsh. CBTR commissions writers with a focus on the natural world and our relationships with it, and is currently run by Diva Harris. It has supported several new authors in the early stages of their careers, including Amy Liptrot and Luke Turner of The Quietus, who both wrote regular columns for Caught By The River that later became critically acclaimed books. CBTR also releases music on the Rivertones label and hosts stages at UK festivals including Port Eliot and Cerys Matthews' The Good Life Experience.

=== Heavenly Films ===
In 2009 Martin Kelly left Heavenly Recordings and set up Heavenly Films with his brother, Paul Kelly. Their films include Lawrence of Belgravia (2011), about Lawrence from indie band Felt, and Dexys: Nowhere Is Home (2014).

== Roster ==
=== Current ===
- Amber Arcades
- audiobooks
- Baxter Dury
- Boy Azooga
- Chai
- Confidence Man
- Delivery
- Dexys Midnight Runners
- Duke Garwood
- Gwenno Saunders
- H. Hawkline
- Hatchie
- Jimi Goodwin
- Katy J. Pearson
- Kneecap
- Mark Lanegan
- Mattiel
- Night Beats
- The Orielles
- The Parrots
- Pip Blom
- Saint Etienne
- Stealing Sheep
- Unloved
- Working Men's Club

=== Former ===
- 22-20s
- Beggars
- Bronx Dogs
- Cherry Ghost
- Dr. Robert
- Dot Allison
- Doves
- DRINKS
- East Village
- Eaves
- Edwyn Collins
- Fever The Ghost
- Espiritu
- Fabulous
- Fionn Regan
- Flowered Up
- King Gizzard & the Lizard Wizard
- Pete Fowler
- Pete Greenwood
- Hooton Tennis Club
- James Levy and the Blood Red Rose
- Jaymay
- Ed Harcourt
- The Hybirds
- Kid Wave
- LCMDF
- The Magic Numbers
- Manic Street Preachers
- Monkey Mafia
- Trevor Moss & Hannah-Lou
- Nada Surf
- Northern Uproar
- Omega Amoeba
- Beth Orton
- Q-Tee
- The Head and the Heart
- The Soft Pack
- The Little Ones
- The Loose Salute
- The Rockingbirds
- Sea of Bees
- Sly and Lovechild
- Temples
- The Wytches
- Toy
- The Voyeurs
- James Walbourne
- The Vines
- The Wishing Stones

== See also ==
- List of record labels
