= Temper Temper (duo) =

English musical duo

- Origin: Manchester, England
- Genres: Dance, soul
- Years active: Early 1990s
- Labels: Virgin, 10
- Past members: Eric Gooden; Melanie Williams

Temper Temper were an English musical duo active in the early 1990s whose members were songwriter/producer Eric Gooden (of Sweet Mercy) and singer Melanie Williams.

Gooden and Williams were previously known as the duo No Sovereign who released the single "Showdown" in 1987 on Geffen Records.

The duo released their only album, the self-titled Temper Temper in 1991. It contains the single "Talk Much" which briefly registered on the UK Singles Chart.

== After Temper Temper ==
Gooden continued as a producer with his act Sweet Mercy (alongside Eric Powell) and continues to release material to the present day. The duo had two top 10 UK Dance hits in 1996 with "Happy Days" and "Into Your Heart", the latter under the name '6 by Six'.

Williams went solo and featured on dance trio Sub Sub's 1993 UK No. 3 hit "Ain't No Love (Ain't No Use)", then in 1994 released the album Human Cradle (also produced by Gooden) on the Columbia label which spawned four UK chart hits, including the top 30 duet version of "You Are Everything", with Joe Roberts. They both formed the duo Dark Flower in 2001, then changed their name to Bodhi in 2007 and later Butterfly Jam in 2011.

== Discography ==
=== Albums ===
- Temper Temper (1991), Virgin/10

=== Singles ===
- "Like We Used To" (1991), 10
- "It's All Outta Lovin' You" (1991), 10
- "Talk Much" (1991), 10/Virgin - UK No. 94
