= Rowetta =

British singer (born 1966)

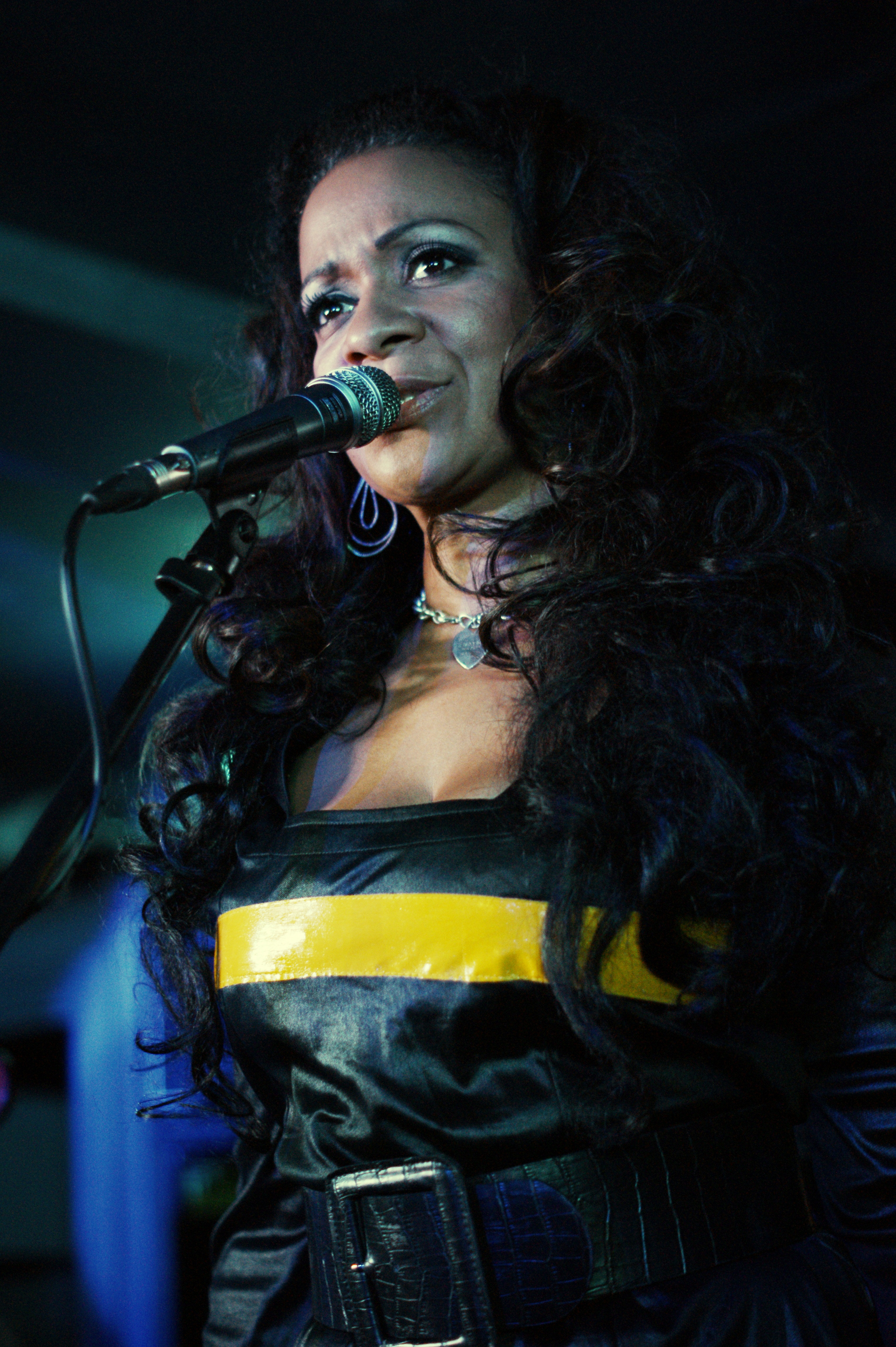
- Rowetta performing in 2011

Background information
- Born: Rowetta Idah; 5 January 1966 (age 60); Manchester, England
- Genres: R&B; pop; soul; dance; rock
- Occupation: Singer
- Years active: 1987–present
- Labels: Factory; Elektra; Gut; Haçienda
- Formerly of: Happy Mondays

Rowetta Idah (born 5 January 1966), also known as Rowetta or Rowetta Satchell, is an English singer. She worked with Happy Mondays, recording and touring with the band from 1990. Her 1989 track "Reach Out" with Sweet Mercy has been sampled by Steve Angello, Laidback Luke, Todd Terry, and the Black Eyed Peas. She was also the last woman standing and was the sixth contestant eliminated in the first series of The X Factor in 2004.

== Early years ==
Rowetta was born to an English mother of Jewish origin and a Nigerian father, politician George Idah, who left the family when she was three. She realised her singing ability after winning a talent competition at the age of twelve. She attended Unsworth Comprehensive School and after completing her secondary education worked as a professional singer.

== Career ==
In 1987, Rowetta released two singles with the Vanilla Sound Corps. She also sang on Inner City songs. During this time, she released two songs: "Back Where We Belong" and "Passion". In 1988, she collaborated with Dynasty of 2 on the single "Stop This Thing". She worked as a backing singer on albums, including Simply Red's 1991 album Stars. Rowetta is the voice on the 1989 track "Reach Out" with Sweet Mercy. The track has been sampled by many, including Laidback Luke, Slam, Steve Angello and Todd Terry, and was remixed and re-released in 2008.

=== Happy Mondays ===
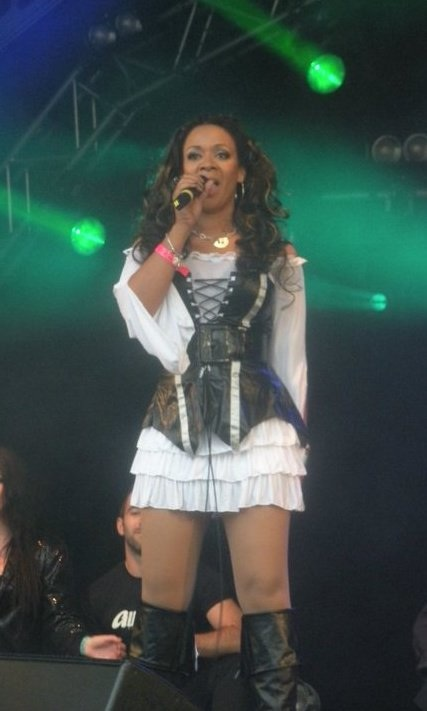
Rowetta performing at Manchester Pride in 2010

In 1990, Rowetta began working and touring with the Happy Mondays as a guest vocalist. She featured on their single "Step On" which charted at number 5. This was followed by two albums, Pills 'n' Thrills and Bellyaches and Yes Please!, and three world tours. The group split and reformed a few times.

After the break-up of the Happy Mondays, she did not return to the music business immediately, although she did play herself in the Michael Winterbottom film 24 Hour Party People, which depicted the band's most successful years.

Rowetta toured with Happy Mondays in 2012 with the full original lineup. A tour followed and a new album and world tour were planned for 2013.

In 2023, Rowetta was featured on the single "In Ecstasy" by Shed Seven.

In 2024, Happy Mondays announced that Rowetta would no longer be touring with the band.

=== The X Factor ===
Rowetta re-entered the spotlight in 2004 when she auditioned for a place in the live shows of The X Factor. After impressing the judges with her rendition of "Lady Marmalade", she was placed in the over-25 category, which was mentored by Simon Cowell, who described her as "Amazing, but barking bloody mad".

Her soulful, powerful voice proved to be a hit with audiences, although she was criticised for competing as an established singer against amateurs. The producers defended her, stating that the show was open to anybody. Her performances on the show earned her rave reviews and she made the quarter-final and was the last woman in the competition, never having to compete in a sing-off.

=== Post X Factor ===
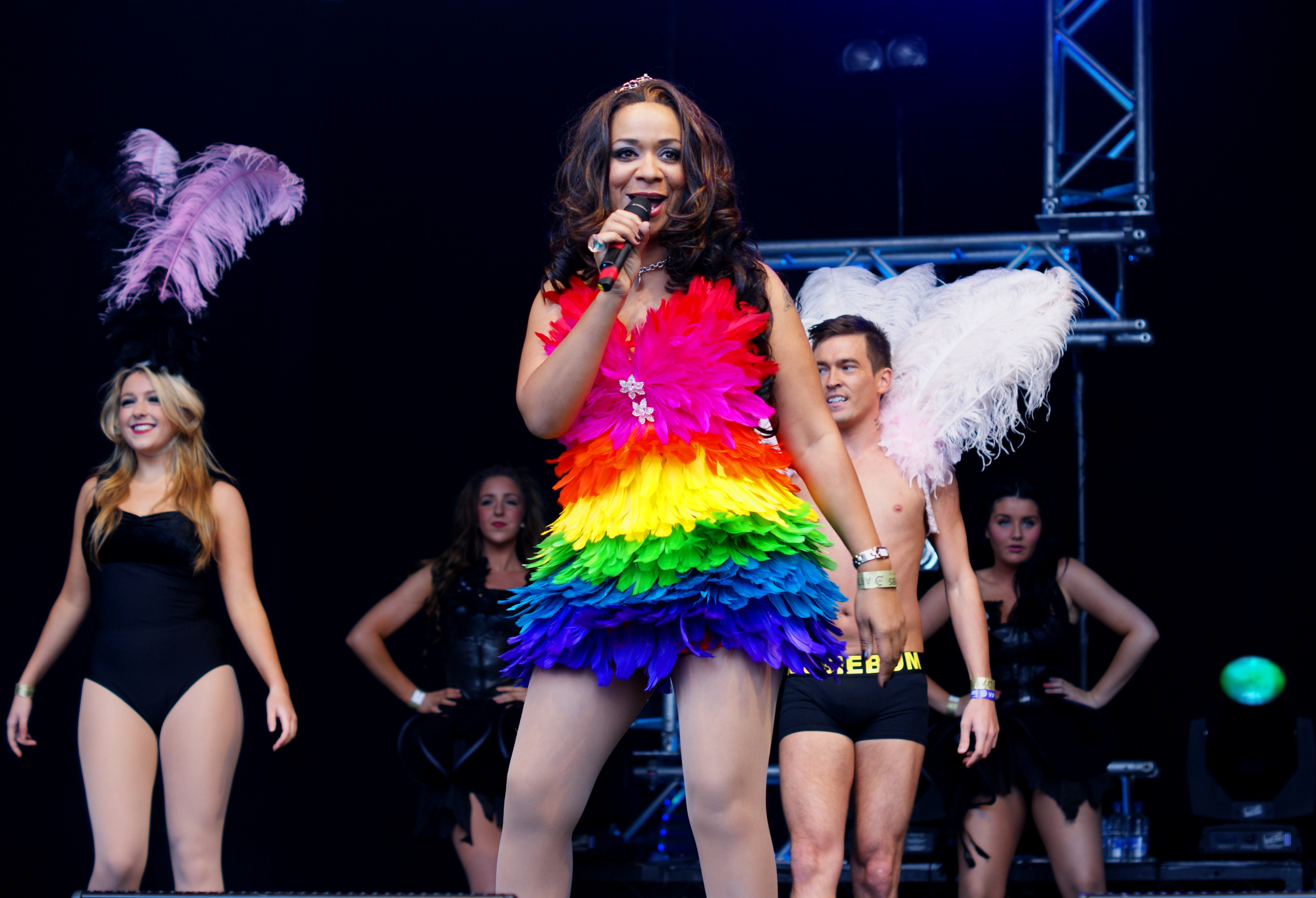
Rowetta performing at Manchester Pride in 2011

In 2005, Rowetta released an album on Gut Records. In November 2005 and 2006, she appeared on the BBC's Children in Need appeal, singing live with the BBC Orchestra in 2005, and on Celebrity Scissorhands in 2006. She provided vocals for the Cornershop single "Wop the Groove" in 2006.

In 2006, Rowetta had a cameo as herself in Footballer's Wives:Extra Time. A year later, she made her musical theatre debut at the Palace Theatre, Manchester in The Best of Broadway, alongside Suranne Jones, and appeared at the IndigO_{2} with Marti Webb, Stephen Gately and Maria Friedman in Christmas on Broadway. Rowetta also spent August 2007 presenting the show The Terry & Ro Show on Gaydio with Terry Longden, and also became the station imaging on community station Salford City Radio. In addition, she toured Japan, where she has a huge fanbase. She also appeared on a Reality TV Special of The Weakest Link where she was voted off in the seventh round.

According to a 2008 BBC 6 Music interview with Peter Hook, Rowetta recorded vocals for a track on the debut album by his new band Freebass. A new version of "Reach Out" featuring Rowetta and mixed by Mobin Master spent Christmas 2008 and the first part of 2009 at number one on the Beatport charts.

Rowetta also presented her own radio show on Saturdays at 4 pm on Gaydio 88.4FM and co-presented the Manchester United fanzine show Red Wednesday on BBC Radio Manchester. She starred in a nationwide tour of The Songs of Sister Act with Sheila Ferguson. Rowetta toured the UK with the London Community Gospel Choir in a new version of The Songs of Sister Act. In 2010, Rowetta appeared with Peter Hook and the Light, for many dates of Hook's Unknown Pleasures tour and has collaborated with Tom Stephan (Superchumbo) and J Nitti on new dance tracks. Also in 2010, Rowetta appeared in the Pop Goes the '80s UK theatre tour. In 2011, she recorded with Peter Hook and the Light, Mirror People and the Kino Club. In 2014, Rowetta appeared on stage at Party in the Park's Poole. On 18 May 2015, she performed with the Light for their 35th anniversary of the death of Joy Division frontman Ian Curtis.

In 2015, Rowetta toured again with the Happy Mondays for their 25th-year anniversary of the album Pills 'n' Thrills and Bellyaches.

== Personal life ==
During her time on The X Factor, it was revealed that Rowetta had been a victim of domestic violence in the hands of her ex-husband Noel Satchell, whom she had married at the age of eighteen. Rowetta, who had two children with her ex-husband, fled the marriage in 1987 to hide in a refuge home, and the couple later divorced. Rowetta has since become a spokesperson for domestic violence awareness, and in 2005 featured in the BBC documentary Battered and Bruised. She also fronted the 2010 World Cup "End the Fear" campaign for Greater Manchester Police.

=== Allegations against Shaun Ryder ===
In March 2025, Rowetta alleged that former Happy Mondays bandmate Shaun Ryder punched and knocked her unconscious in 2000 while they were travelling on a Stena Line ferry after performing at Dublin's Witness Festival. She claimed that her son witnessed the aftermath and that there were multiple witnesses present. Rowetta has since called for anyone with footage or knowledge of the incident to come forward.

She also urged fellow Happy Mondays member Bez to corroborate her claims and has stated that she intends to seek legal advice and involve the police.

Ryder has denied the allegations, with a spokesperson stating he was "shocked and dismayed" and had referred the matter to his lawyers.

== Filmography ==
Year	Film	Role	Notes
2002	24 Hour Party People	Herself	Cameo appearance
