= Sweet Mercy =

English house music duo

- Also known as: 6 by Six
- Origin: England
- Genres: House
- Years active: 1988–present
- Labels: Blip Music, 10, Grass Green Records, Boo Records Inc.
- Members: Eric Gooden; Eric Powell

Sweet Mercy are an English house music duo formed in the late 1980s, consisting of Eric Gooden and Eric Powell. In 1992 in Manchester, the duo founded their own house and techno record label, Bush Records.

Their single "Happy Days" featuring singer Joe Roberts charted on the UK Singles Chart in early 1996.

Also in 1996, under the alias 6 by Six, the duo scored a UK chart hit with "Into Your Heart".

The vocals of singer Rowetta in the duo's 1990 song "Reach Out" has been sampled by many artists such as the Black Eyed Peas, Slam, Peshay, DJ Zinc, Todd Terry, Matrix & Futurebound, Steve Angello, Laidback Luke and Oliver Heldens. In 2008, "Reach Out" was remixed and re-released with mixes by J Nitti, Peter Presta and Mobin Master, among others.

== Other work ==
In 1991, Eric Gooden and Melanie Williams under the name Temper Temper scored a minor chart hit with the single "Talk Much" and also released the self-titled album Temper Temper.

Gooden is also credited as having contributed backing vocals on the song "Last Time Lover" by the Spice Girls, from their 1996 debut album Spice.

== Discography ==
=== Singles and EPs ===
- "R.U. Hot" (1988)
- "Reach Out" (featuring Rowetta) (1990)
- "Take Me Away" (featuring Natasha) (1990)
- "Get Another Love" (1993)
- "Happy Days" (featuring Joe Roberts) (1995) - UK #63, UK Dance #8
- "U Got the Love" (featuring Joe Roberts) (1997)
- Reach Out 2008 (featuring Rowetta) (2008)
- "Reach Out (Mobin Master Remix)" (featuring Rowetta) (2008)
- "Take Your Time (Do It Right)" (featuring Veba) (2009)
- Feet Don't Fail Me Now (Falling) (with J Nitti featuring Joe Roberts) (2009)
- Make My Dreams a Reality (with Emanuel "GQ" Rahiem) (2010)
- "I Need Your Lovin (Jam Xpress Mixes)" (featuring Melanie Williams) (2011)
- "Reach Out in Ibiza (Remixes)" (featuring Rowetta) (2013)
- "The Love I Feel (Jeremy Juno Mixes)" (featuring Veba) (2014)

As 6 by Six

- "Into Your Heart" (1996) - UK #51, UK Dance #3
