= Boom Boom Pow =

2009 single by the Black Eyed Peas

Single by Black Eyed Peas

from the album The E.N.D.
- Released: February 22, 2009
- Genre: EDM; hip hop; electro
- Length: 5:08 (album version); 4:12 (single version); 3:38 (radio edit)
- Label: Interscope
- Songwriters: William Adams; Allan Pineda; Jaime Gomez; Stacy Ferguson
- Producer: will.i.am

Black Eyed Peas singles chronology
"Mas que Nada" (2006)	"Boom Boom Pow" (2009)	"I Gotta Feeling" (2009)

Music video
- "Boom Boom Pow" on YouTube

"Boom Boom Pow" is a song recorded by American group the Black Eyed Peas for their fifth studio album The E.N.D. (2009). It was written by group members will.i.am, apl.de.ap, Taboo and Fergie, being produced by will.i.am. The song features a vocal sample from the 1990 song "Reach Out" by British house duo Sweet Mercy featuring singer Rowetta. It was released as the lead single from The E.N.D. on February 22, 2009, by Interscope Records.

"Boom Boom Pow" topped the Billboard Hot 100 for 12 weeks, making it the group's first number-one single on the chart. It is the second longest-running single to stay atop the chart in 2009, beaten only by their own "I Gotta Feeling", which held the top spot for 14 consecutive weeks. The song also topped the charts in Australia, Canada and the United Kingdom, as well as reaching the top ten in more than 20 countries. It was ranked atop the Billboard Hot 100 year-end chart for 2009, at number seven on the decade-end chart for the 2000s, and at number 51 on the all-time chart. The Recording Industry Association of America certified it diamond.

Critically acclaimed, "Boom Boom Pow" was nominated for Best Dance Recording and won Best Short Form Music Video at the 52nd Annual Grammy Awards (2010). Rolling Stone ranked the song at number 14 on their list "Best 25 Songs of 2009". As of April 2025, the music video has over 511 million views on YouTube.

== Music and lyrics ==
"Boom Boom Pow" features a vocal sample from the 1990 song "Reach Out" by British house duo Sweet Mercy featuring singer Rowetta. It opens with will.i.am meditating on and affirming a new, progressive sound for the group: "I got that rock-and-roll, that future flow". Fergie, Taboo, and apl.de.ap each offer a variation on this theme, after which will.i.am, introduced by Fergie, demonstrates the theme at work in a series of rapid-fire raps, punctuated with digital effects. The song concludes with Fergie repeating her initial verse—which, sticking with the progressive theme, declares "I'm so three thousand and eight, you so two thousand and late"—forming an outro of sorts and taking the listener more or less full-circle. Fergie has commented on the unusual structure of the song, stating:

I feel that "Boom Boom Pow" is not your typical first single. It's not the typical, let's do a hooky chorus, and you know, have a feel good-heart love song, or anything like that. It's basically kind of to the left. We've always been kind of misfits, and so it kind of fits. The song is to the left, but it works, because we're being true to ourselves.

The song's beat is influenced by 1980s electro song "Planet Rock" by Afrika Bambaataa and Soul Sonic Force. will.i.am stated on Merrick and Rosso that the song was heavily influenced by the electro sounds he heard in the nightclubs in Sydney during the filming of X-Men Origins: Wolverine and his visit to Australia. He later commented in a video on Billboard:

"Boom Boom Pow" was made for underground clubs. Like, if I would've thought that was gonna be a radio song, I would've made it different. For example, when we made "Don't Lie", I was like 'oh, let's make this radio friendly. "Big Girls Don't Cry", ooh this sounds like a radio song, let me put some radio touch on it.' That don't exist anymore. There's no such thing as a radio song. Radio is what the people want, and "Boom Boom Pow" is proof that if something's dope, regardless of if it has that sprinkled radio vibe, that it should be played on the radio and the people are gonna like it.

== Release ==
"Boom Boom Pow" was released to U.S. mainstream radio on March 13, 2009. It was released officially on iTunes in the U.S. on March 30, 2009. It was scheduled to be released in the UK on May 25, 2009, however due to three alternative versions of the song entering the UK iTunes Top 50 songs, the Black Eyed Peas version was released two weeks early, on Sunday, May 10. One of their full performances took place at the American Idol Finale of 2009, during which the Top 13 girls sang "Glamorous", and then Fergie came out and sang a small part of "Big Girls Don't Cry", eventually switching to "Boom Boom Pow". As of June 2009, an unknown number of North American radio stations have elected to censor the song's reference to satellite radio. Most UK radio stations have also been found to distort the word satellite radio, and this is the version that appears on the UK CD single.

== Remixes ==
The official remix of the song is titled "Let the Beat Rock - Boys Noize Remix". The track is produced by Boys Noize with five versions of the song. These remixes credit recording to Pardraic Kerin and mixing to Dylan "3-D" Dresdow. The official remix features 50 Cent, and is structured like so: 50 Cent's verse goes first, then will.i.am's first new verse, then Fergie, later the chorus, Fergie's first verse is repeated, then will.i.am's second verse, later the chorus, Fergie's first verse is repeated, apl.de.ap and Taboo's verse from the original were used, then Fergie's second verse, later the chorus, and the song ends with will.i.am saying "pow". The song only lasts 4:30.

A "Megamix" version was also very popular, and is structured like so: will.i.am's verse from the first version goes first, then 50's verse, later the chorus, then Fergie's, then will.i.am's new second verse, later the chorus, Fergie's first verse is repeated, later the chorus, and the song ends. The song only lasts 3:29. The megamix version features Gucci Mane. A third version features Flo Rida, a fourth version is a mash-up of the 50 Cent Remix and the Gucci Mane Remix, and a fifth version is remixed by Busta Rhymes and Fatman Scoop. A remix by DJ Ammo and A Poet Named Life is played in the ending credits of the 2009 Summer blockbuster film G.I. Joe: The Rise of Cobra. At the 2009 American Music Awards, the guitar riff from "Smells Like Teen Spirit" by Nirvana was played after the performance of this song. Another remix of this song was made by David Guetta, titled " David Guetta's Electro Hop Remix". On the fourth season of America's Best Dance Crew, a District 78 remix of the song was used for the sudden death challenge on the first episode, in the dance-off between Beat Ya Feet Kings, Southern Movement, and Fr3sh. Fr3sh was eliminated. In 2009, Jeffree Star created a remix with more explicit lyrics, that was originally available as a free download. The original download link no longer works; however, many videos of live performances are available.

== Critical reception ==
Nick Levine from Digital Spy gave "Boom Boom Pow" four out of five stars, saying that "it's a fairly ridiculous robopop stomper featuring no real chorus, 808s & Heartbreak-style beats, lashings of Auto-Tune, techno synths that arrive half-way through and this vintage diss from Fergie: 'I'm so 3008, you're so 2000 and late.' It may well become grating, but frankly who cares? Right now this just sounds cracking." Billboard gave the song a positive review, stating that the song "shows The Black Eyed Peas in fine form" and that it was "a knockout".

- Boston Globe: "Dealt with individually, substance-free, grammatically suspect dance-floor jams like current monster hit 'Boom Boom Pow,' the slinky 'Imma Be,' or the fuzzy 'Missing You' could be booty-shaking guilty pleasures."
- Dot Music: "E.N.D. opener 'Boom Boom Boom' has a long way to go before it even tickles the room, mid-tempo beats cushioning a Fergie vocal that an autotune stuck on override can't sort out."
- Entertainment Weekly: "Indeed, indefatigable Auto-Tune anthems like The E.N.D's propulsive lead single, 'Boom Boom Pow' (already the band's most successful to date), seem fueled by some mysterious slurry of dance-floor plutonium and diet Red Bull."
- Vibe magazine: "However, the intergalactic punch of 'Boom Boom Pow'–BEP's first Billboard chart-topper–has stimulated a slew of cosigns from the likes of 50 Cent, Gucci Mane, and Kid Cudi."
- The Guardian: "As on their recent No 1 single, 'Boom Boom Pow', electronic clicks and buzzes are used lavishly, and the mood is as positive as ever. Just don't expect to love it immediately."
- Los Angeles Times: "The titles of the Peas' biggest hits tell the story: the giggle-inducing pun of 'Don't Phunk With My Heart,' the cheerily crude anatomical gesture of 'My Humps' and now the Imax-ready sound effects burst of the chart-topping 'Boom Boom Pow.'"
- Rolling Stone: "Whereupon the record segues into the Number One hit 'Boom Boom Pow,' and all hell breaks loose. There are Auto-Tune vocal trills, eerie synth chords, screechy disco-diva wailing, 808 thuds, raps about 808 thuds and a dizzying barrage of doggerel: 'I got that . . . digital spit/Next-level visual shit.' It is an assault on the senses, and on good taste. And it's the best thing The Black Eyed Peas have ever recorded."
- The Independent: "Contrary to Fergie's claim on 'Boom Boom Pow' that 'I'm so 3008, you so 2000-and-late', their supposedly innovative electro-beat stylings are tired."

== Chart performance ==
In Australia, "Boom Boom Pow" was released on March 30, 2009, and debuted on the ARIA Charts on April 6. It reached number one, staying there for six weeks. It spent 27 weeks in the Top 20. Australia is the first country in which the song was released. As of October 2015, the song has sold 6.9 million downloads in the US and was certified 4× Platinum by the RIAA. This number of singles sold makes the Black Eyed Peas the second artist to have two singles each selling six million copies or more, following Lady Gaga.

The song debuted at number 71 on the Billboard Hot 100 after garnering heavy airplay. The song rocketed from number 39 to number one in its fourth week on the chart. The single sold 465,000 downloads in its first week of digital release, the third-largest number of download sales in a single week overall, and the largest single-week and debut-download totals by a group in the history of digital-download sales tracking, reaching number one on the U.S. Billboard Hot 100 and Pop 100. It became the group's first U.S. number one, holding the spot for twelve consecutive weeks. Having been dethroned to number two by the other Black Eyed Peas' song, "I Gotta Feeling", it is the second longest running number one song of 2009 on the chart, behind "I Gotta Feeling", and the first song to spend at least twelve weeks at number one since Mariah Carey's "We Belong Together" in 2005. The chart week of May 30, 2009 "Boom Boom Pow" became only the fifth song to top both Billboard's Mainstream Top 40 and Rhythmic Top 40 charts in the same week, reaching an estimated audience of 99 million on U.S. radio that week.

It was the fourth song of the decade to spend at least twelve weeks at number one, and only the twelfth song in the chart's history to spend at least twelve weeks at the top. It is the band's first Rhythmic number one, and their second Mainstream Top 40 number one. "Boom Boom Pow" became the first song in digital history to spend its first twelve weeks of release as the most-downloaded song in America, selling at least 200,000 copies a week for eleven straight weeks. Billboard ranked it as the No. 1 song of 2009. It has also topped the charts on the Canadian Hot 100 the same week as on the Hot 100 and on the Australian ARIA Charts. On the New Zealand RIANZ chart, the song has peaked at number two. Moreover, it has charted within the top 10 in more than ten countries.

On May 17, 2009, it entered the UK Singles Chart at number one based on almost 75,000 downloads alone. It is the band's second number one in the UK (the other being "Where Is the Love?" which also reached the top of the chart six years prior). It has also reached number three so far in Ireland. After being knocked off the number one spot in the United Kingdom on May 24, 2009, by "Bonkers" by Dizzee Rascal and Armand Van Helden, the song remained at the number two slot for 2 weeks before returning to number one on June 7, 2009. "Bonkers" had meanwhile swapped places with "Boom Boom Pow" and took the number two slot. This subsequently marks the first time a song has had two separate runs at the summit of the chart since Shakira's "Hips Don't Lie" in July 2006. Their follow up single in the UK "I Gotta Feeling" also peaked at number one and managed the same feat of having two separate runs at number one on the UK Singles Chart. With sales of over 600,000, the single is currently the sixth best selling of 2009 in the UK. "Boom Boom Pow" is also the 13th best selling R&B song of the 21st century in the UK.

== Music video ==
will.i.am in the futuristic-themed video for "Boom Boom Pow"

Fergie had stated at an interview on The Insider that the music video would be shooting the week of March 8, 2009. The making of the video was released by MTV on April 8. In an interview to MTV, it was said that "... the concept of the video is the Peas' birth into the digital afterlife," Fergie said. "So the transformation is us going into a sort of birth or cocoon and coming out the other end as forms of energy. It's a parallel to the music industry. Now everything is downloaded." will.i.am stated that the video was inspired by how digital the world has become and hopes the video portrays "what it would be like if we were actually in the computer, if art was fused in it," he said. "[It's] analog life from a digital perspective. Becoming technology." The music video was directed by Mathew Cullen and Mark Kudsi. The video premiered on Dipdive on April 18, 2009, and was released on iTunes on April 24, 2009. The video is set in the year of 3008, portraying "how it would be like if we actually lived in computers". This concept was based in a line of the song, in which singer Fergie states "I'm so 3008 / You so 2000 and late".

The video starts with Taboo flicking through pictures on a HP TouchSmart, he selects the image of a mushroom cloud. As the singing starts, images of computer icons, random computer code and some ASCII art of "THE END" are flashing in the background. The Black Eyed Peas are then seen singing their verses of the song. While this is happening, dancers are seen in striped zentai suits, dancing to the song, and negative images are turned into positive images; for instance, the explosion cloud turns into a tree swing, the grenade into a microphone, a gun into a trumpet and a nuclear waste barrel played as a drum. The video also features the face used on the album cover miming along to various lyrics; the face was designed as an amalgam of all four band members' facial features. Much of the imagery in the video is a homage to Rebecca Allen's 1986 video for the Kraftwerk song "Musique Non Stop". The video was meant to go the full song but they cut it to 3:29. The video won a Grammy at the 52nd Annual Grammy Awards in the category of Best Short Form Music Video. As of December 2023, the music video of the song scored over 472 million views on YouTube.

== Alleged copyright infringement ==
In January 2010, Chicago artist Ebony Latrice Batts, better known by her stage name Phoenix Phenom, alleged the song is simply a copy of her track, "Boom Dynamite" (written by Manfred Mohr). The duo allegedly sent a demo tape to Interscope Records. They lost the lawsuit against the Black Eyed Peas.

== Formats and track listings ==
- Australian and German CD single
1. "Boom Boom Pow" (radio edit) – 3:38
2. "Boom Boom Pow" (album version) – 4:13
- French and UK CD single
1. "Boom Boom Pow" (radio edit) – 3:38
2. "Boom Boom Wow" (DJ will.i.am) – 4:12
- German CD maxi single
1. "Boom Boom Pow" (radio edit) – 3:38
2. "Boom Boom Pow" (album version) – 4:13
3. "Boom Boom Pow" (instrumental) – 4:12
4. "Boom Boom Wow" (DJ will.i.am) – 4:12
- Digital download
1. "Boom Boom Pow" – 4:12
- Digital download (EP)
1. "Boom Boom Pow" (radio edit) – 3:38
2. "Boom Boom Pow" (album version) – 4:11
3. "Boom Boom Pow" (instrumental) – 4:12
- Digital download (Invasion of Boom Boom Pow – Megamix EP)
1. "Let the Beat Rock" (Boys Noize Megamix featuring 50 Cent) – 3:30
2. "Let the Beat Rock" (Boys Noize Megamix featuring Gucci Mane) – 3:09
3. "Boom Boom Style" (Zuper Blahq Megamix featuring Kid Cudi) – 3:37
4. "Boom Boom Guetta" (David Guetta's Electro Hop Remix) – 4:02
5. "Boom Boom Wow" (D.J. will.i.am Megamix) – 4:12
6. "Boom Boom Boom" (DJ Ammo/Poet Named Life Megamix) – 5:48

== Charts ==
=== Weekly charts ===
Chart (2009)	Peak position
Australia (ARIA)	1
Austria (Ö3 Austria Top 40)	3
Belgium (Ultratop 50 Flanders)	1
Belgium (Ultratop 50 Wallonia)	1
Canada Hot 100 (Billboard)	1
Croatia (HRT)	1
Czech Republic Airplay (ČNS IFPI)	6
Denmark (Tracklisten)	5
Euro Digital Song Sales (Billboard)	1
Finland (Suomen virallinen lista)	5
France (SNEP)	4
Germany (GfK)	3
Hungary (Rádiós Top 40)	30
Ireland (IRMA)	3
Israel International Airplay (Media Forest)	1
Italy (FIMI)	11
Netherlands (Dutch Top 40)	10
Netherlands (Single Top 100)	4
New Zealand (Recorded Music NZ)	2
Norway (VG-lista)	7
Portugal Digital Song Sales (Billboard)	1
Romania (Romanian Top 100)	36
Scottish Singles Sales (Official Charts)	3
Spain (Promusicae)	12
Sweden (Sverigetopplistan)	10
Switzerland (Schweizer Hitparade)	4
UK Singles (Official Charts)	1
UK Hip Hop/R&B (Official Charts)	1
US Billboard Hot 100	1
US Adult Pop Airplay (Billboard)	21
US Dance Club Songs (Billboard)	2
US Hot R&B/Hip-Hop Songs (Billboard)	51
US Hot Rap Songs (Billboard)	1
US Pop Airplay (Billboard)	1
US Rhythmic Airplay (Billboard)	1

=== Monthly charts ===
Chart (2009)	Position
Brazil (Brasil Hot 100 Airplay)	21
Brazil (Brasil Hot Pop Songs)	13

=== Year-end charts ===
Chart (2009)	Position
Australia (ARIA)	4
Austria (Ö3 Austria Top 40)	20
Belgium (Ultratop 50 Flanders)	5
Belgium (Ultratop 50 Wallonia)	8
Brazil (Crowley)	10
Canada (Canadian Hot 100)	4
Denmark (Tracklisten)	27
European Hot 100 Singles (Billboard)	15
France (SNEP)	17
Germany (GfK)	27
Hungary (Rádiós Top 40)	122
Japan Adult Contemporary (Billboard)	32
Netherlands (Dutch Top 40)	39
Netherlands (Single Top 100)	11
New Zealand (Recorded Music NZ)	5
Norway (VG-lista)	26
Sweden (Sverigetopplistan)	21
Switzerland (Schweizer Hitparade)	17
Taiwan (Yearly Singles Top 100)	22
UK Singles (Official Charts)	7
US Billboard Hot 100	1
US Dance Club Songs (Billboard)	43
US Pop Airplay (Billboard)	6
US Rhythmic (Billboard)	5

Chart (2010)	Position
Belgium (Ultratop 50 Wallonia)	88

=== Decade-end charts ===
Chart (2000–2009)	Position
Australia (ARIA)	14
UK Singles (OCC)	47
US Billboard Hot 100	7

=== All-time charts ===
Chart	Position
US Billboard Hot 100	63
US Pop Airplay (Billboard)	82

== Certifications ==
Certifications and sales
Region	Certification	Certified units/sales
Australia (ARIA)	4× Platinum	280,000^{^}
Belgium (BRMA)	Platinum	
Brazil (Pro-Música Brasil)	Diamond	250,000^{‡}
Canada (Music Canada)	8× Platinum	320,000^{*}
Denmark (IFPI Danmark)	Gold	7,500^{^}
France (SNEP)	Diamond	333,333^{‡}
Germany (BVMI)	Gold	150,000^{^}
Italy (FIMI)	Gold	50,000^{‡}
Japan (RIAJ) Ringtone	Gold	100,000^{*}
New Zealand (RMNZ)	2× Platinum	60,000^{‡}
Spain (Promusicae)	Gold	20,000^{*}
Sweden (GLF)	Gold	10,000^{‡}
Switzerland (IFPI Switzerland)	Platinum	30,000^{^}
United Kingdom (BPI)	2× Platinum	1,200,000^{‡}
United States (RIAA)	Diamond	10,000,000^{‡}
^{*} Sales figures based on certification alone.^{^} Shipments figures based on certification alone.^{‡} Sales+streaming figures based on certification alone.

== Release history ==
Release dates and formats
Region	Date	Format(s)	Label(s)	Ref.
United States	February 22, 2009	Streaming	Interscope; will.i.am	
United States	March 2, 2009	Digital download	Interscope; will.i.am	
United States	March 10, 2009	Contemporary hit radio; rhythmic contemporary radio	Interscope; will.i.am	
Germany	May 8, 2009	CD; maxi CD	Universal Music	
Australia	May 15, 2009	CD	Universal Music	
United Kingdom	May 25, 2009	CD	Polydor	
France	June 22, 2009	CD	Polydor	

== See also ==
- List of number-one singles in Australia in 2009
- List of Hot 100 number-one singles of 2009 (Canada)
- List of European number-one hits of 2009
- List of number-one singles from the 2000s (UK)
- List of number-one R&B hits of 2009 (UK)
- List of Hot 100 number-one singles of 2009 (U.S.)
- List of Mainstream Top 40 number-one hits of 2009 (U.S.)
- Ultratop 40 number-one hits of 2009
- Ultratop 50 number-one hits of 2009
