= Les Monégasques =

Les Monégasques may refer to:

- Les Monégasques, a band formed by Jean-Pierre Massiera and Pierre Malaussena in 1964
- Les Monégasques, a nickname for the French football club AS Monaco FC

== See also ==
- Monaco (disambiguation)
- Monégasque (disambiguation)
