= Shergold =

English guitar manufacturer

- Type: Subsidiary
- Industry: Musical instruments
- Founded: October 1967; 59 years ago
- Headquarters: Harold Hill, England
- Products: Electric guitars
- Parent: Barnes & Mullins

Shergold Guitars, or Shergold Woodcrafts Limited, is an English guitar manufacturing company established in October 1967 by former Burns London employees Jack Golder and Norman Houlder. Based in East London, the company moved from Forest Gate to Harold Wood in 1973.

Shergold Guitars is currently a subsidiary of Barnes & Mullins since it was acquired in 2015.

== History ==
Initially the company concentrated on producing woodwork for other companies, principally for Dallas Arbiter under the Hayman brand (until 1975); for Jim Burns himself under the Burns London banner; "Ned Callan" and Rosetti. When the contract for the Hayman guitars came to an end, the Shergold company found themselves with significant stocks of part finished instruments and raw materials. With this stock they launched their first guitars under their own brand name from late 1975.

Shergold concentrated on guitar production until 1982, when a downturn in the guitar market (especially for home grown instruments) meant that they returned to general custom joinery producing furniture, and only undertaking guitar work on a custom order basis. In 1983, Norman left the company to emigrate to Australia, but would return to the country (but not to Shergold) within a few years. In 1991, Jack began making new Shergold guitars - the Limited Edition Masquerader - due to a rising interest at that time in British guitars from the 1970s. This revival was short-lived, as Jack died in 1992. The Shergold company closed shortly afterwards.

Shergold pioneered features that would be used by other manufacturers (bi-directional truss rod, semi-neck-through-body on the Cavalier), and others that have been forgotten (interchangeable control electronics on the Modulator series). Visually, the guitar bodies were slab-sided, featured arcane blackletter lettering and presented a logo of a man carving a guitar body, a style that was often criticised by contemporary reviews.

In 2015, Shergold Guitars was purchased by Brian Cleary and Bruce Perrin of Barnes & Mullins Ltd, the original UK distributor of Shergold guitars. One year later, Patrick James Eggle became a shareholder. Eggle is a British guitar builder responsible for Patrick James Eggle electric and acoustic guitars, and the designer of Faith guitars and the new Sherwood guitars models.

== Artists ==
Notable players of Shergold instruments include:

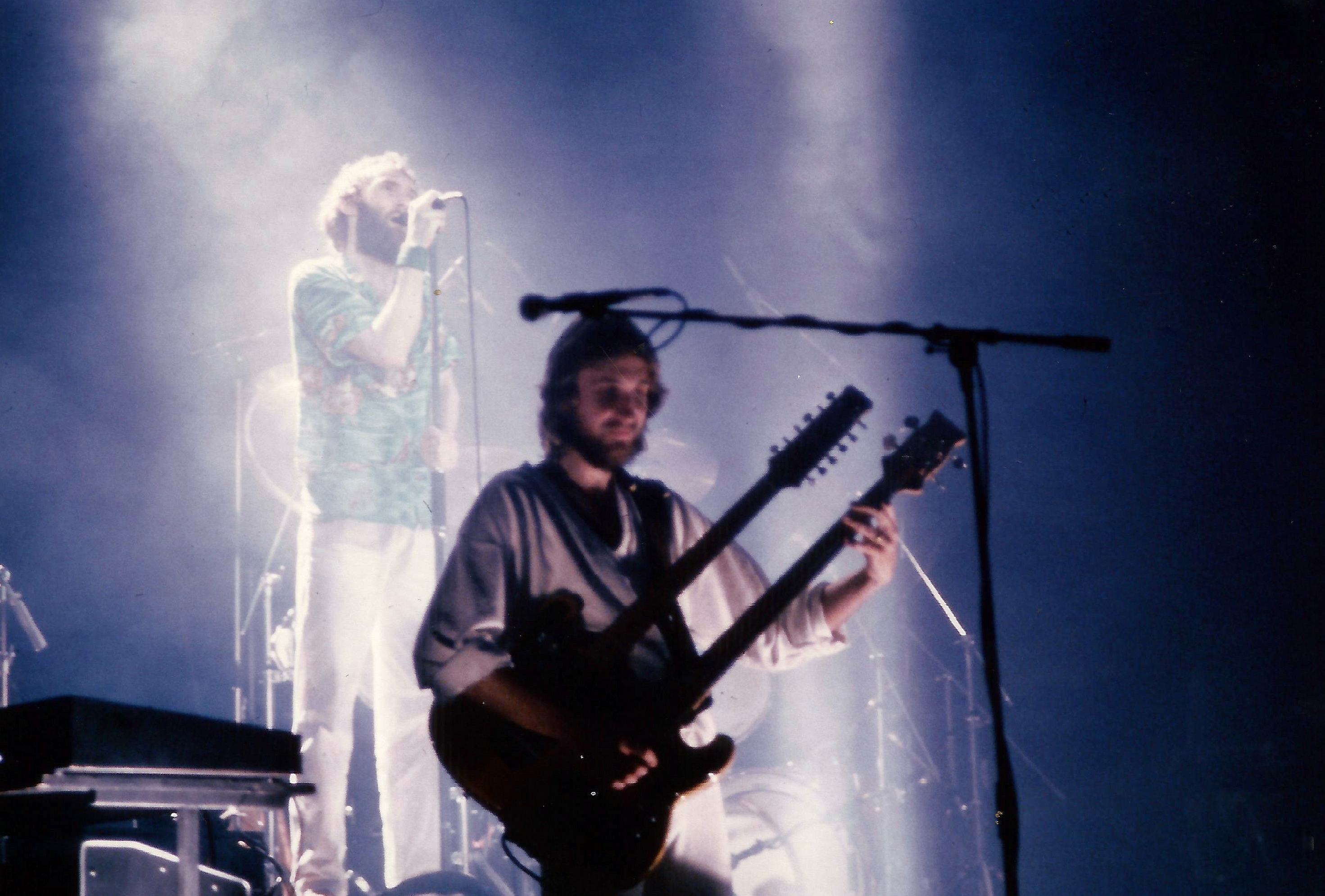
Mike Rutherford playing his double-neck Modulator in concert, 1980

- Mike Rutherford (Genesis) (Note: He had a set of double-neck Modulators custom-made in 1977 which could be split in half and interchanged.)
- Tim Smith (Cardiacs)
- Christian Hayes (Cardiacs)
- Bernard Sumner (Joy Division, New Order) (Note: Particularly on the Unknown Pleasures album.)
- Gillian Gilbert (New Order)
- Peter Hook (Joy Division, New Order) (Note: Played six-string Marathon basses.)
- Julian Cope (Note: Played Custom dobles.)
- P. Paul Fenech (The Meteors)
- Marty Willson-Piper (The Church)
- GP Hall (Note: Played a modified Shergold six-string bass with a half-fretted, half-fretless neck.)
- Gary Marx (The Sisters of Mercy) (Note: Played a Masquerader.)
- Porl King (miserylab)
- Gary Numan (Note: Owns a Modulator bass which he initially wrote "Cars" (song) on.)
- Bob Walsh (The Dooleys) (Note: Played a Modulator bass.)
- Matt Stevens (The Fierce and the Dead)

== Models ==
Some of the models produced by Shergold were:

=== Guitars ===
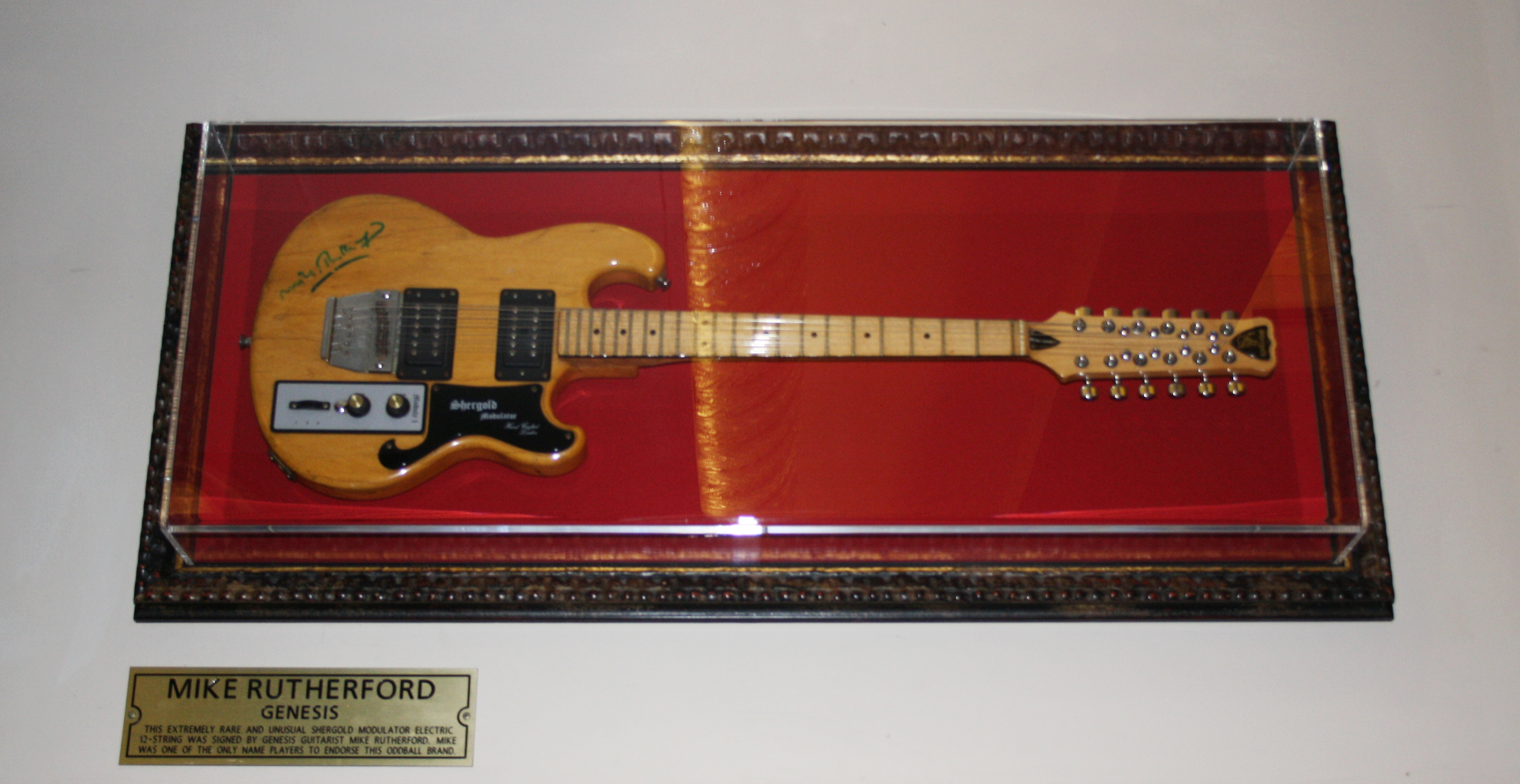
Mike Rutherford's 12-string guitar exhibited at the Hard Rock Cafe in Florence

- Masquerader
- Modulator
- Custom Double (double neck)
- Meteor
- Nu Meteor
- Cavalier
- Activator
- Trojan

=== Basses ===
- Marathon
- Modulator
