= Monaco (disambiguation) =

Monaco is a small country in Western Europe.

Monaco may also refer to:

== Places and jurisdictions ==
- Monaco-Ville, the old town of the principality and one of its administrative divisions
- Monaco, New Zealand, a suburb of Nelson, New Zealand
- Monaco di Baviera, the Italian name for the Bavarian capital, Munich (southern Germany)

== People ==
- Monaco (name), a surname, and a list of people with the name

== Sport and games ==
- AS Monaco FC, Monegasque football club participating in French professional league
- Monaco Grand Prix, a Formula 1 motor-racing event held in the principality
- Circuit de Monaco, the street circuit where the Monaco Grand Prix is held.
- Monaco: What's Yours Is Mine, a stealth and action video game by Pocketwatch Games
- Juan Monaco (born 1984), Argentine tennis player

== Computing and Internet ==
- Monaco (typeface), a monospaced font shipping with macOS
- Monaco (editor), a web-based code editor used by Visual Studio Code
- Microsoft Monaco, codename for a music-making program under development (list of Microsoft codenames)
- Monaco, a CSS wiki layout by Wikia

== Other uses ==
- Monaco (band), a 1996–2000 band consisting of Peter Hook and David Potts
  - Monaco (album), a 2000 album by the eponymous band
- "Monaco" (song), a 2023 song by Bad Bunny
- Dodge Monaco, a model of automobile
- Monaco Coach Corporation, a manufacturer of recreational vehicles
- TAG Heuer Monaco, a wristwatch
- MV Monaco, a Panamanian coaster
- Monaco (cocktail), an alcoholic beverage

== See also ==
- Monoco, 17th-century Nashaway chief
- Monaci
