= It's a Beautiful Life (album) =

Studio album by Freebass
- Released: 20 September 2010
- Genre: Alternative rock
- Length: 59:49
- Label: Haçienda
- Producers: Peter Hook; Phil Murphy

Freebass chronology
Two Worlds Collide EP (2010)	It's a Beautiful Life (2010)

It's a Beautiful Life is the only studio album by the English supergroup Freebass, featuring bassists Peter Hook (Joy Division, New Order, Monaco, The Light), Gary Mounfield (The Stone Roses), Andy Rourke (The Smiths) and vocalist Gary Briggs (Haven). It was released on 20 September 2010 through Hook's Haçienda Records label. The band broke up before the album's release.

== Background and music ==
The album took around five years to finish. During the recording sessions, Haven singer Gary Briggs joined the band and Rourke moved over to guitar. Following Rourke's departure from the band, guitarist Nat Watson recorded the remaining guitar parts on the album. Freebass broke up before the physical release of the album, following a feud between Hook and Mounfield. Hook and Mounfield subsequently sorted out their differences.

It's a Beautiful Life is an eclectic record, and its sound has been described as "a heady mix of modern rock, dub, and Northern soul." The album features reggae elements on songs such as dancehall-leaning "Stalingrad" and "Kill Switch, pt. 141," which features a Jah Wobble-like bassline. The track "World Won't Wait" was described as "a forgotten late-'70s funk-rock hit; processed guitar bounces from speaker to speaker to fill up the sonic space, while synthesizer accents give the track a dark modern feel." Tracks “Not Too Late” and “The God Machine” feature a 1980s new wave-inspired sound, "with percussion that swings between The Cure-meets-REM."

Hook's then-current band New Order was a major influence on the album's sound, particularly on the tracks "The God Machine," "Sister Surrender," "Plan B," and "You Don't Know (This About Me)."

== Critical reception ==
Professional ratings
Review scores
Source	Rating
AllMusic	3/5 stars
Consequence of Sound	C−
PopMatters	5/10
The New Zealand Herald	3/5

The album received mixed reviews from critics. AllMusic critic J. Poet wrote: "Still, with five years of work going into this opus, it's a bit disappointing, a good but not great collection." Alex Young of Consequence of Sound stated: "Not so eye-opening would be the general vibe — a warm nostalgia that you cannot quite place until the music stops and you’ve begun digging through respective members’ repertoires." Young further added: "It's a Beautiful Life is peaceful in places, writhing in others, and, in total, ranks as a must-have for fans of any act seen in this article." Similarly, Scott Kara of The New Zealand Herald though: "Overall, though, it's one for the fans of the old bands to check out." PopMatters' John Bergstrom commented: "Overall, though, It's a Beautiful Life ventures surprisingly little and makes only modest gains."

== Track listing ==
1. "Not Too Late" – 3:38
2. "The Only Ones Alone" – 5:37
3. "Lady Violence" – 4:34
4. "World Won't Wait" – 4:50
5. "Kill Switch, Pt. 141" – 4:20
6. "Stalingrad" – 4:18
7. "Secrets and Lies" – 4:07
8. "She Said" – 3:48
9. "The God Machine" – 4:27
10. "Plan B" – 5:18

== Bonus Tracks ==
1. "I'm a Believer" – 4:18
2. "Bury Me Standing" – 3:50
3. "Sister Surrender" – 4:11

== Personnel ==
Freebass

- Peter Hook – bass, production
- Gary Mounfield – bass
- Gary Briggs – vocals
- Andy Rourke – bass

Other personnel

- Paul Kehoe – drums, keyboards
- Nat Watson – guitar
- Phil Murphy – programming, production
- Dan Broad – engineering
- Roger Lyons – engineering
- Justin Richards – mixing
- Rick Powell – mixing (2)
- Phil Rainey – artwork
