= What Do You Want from Me? (Monaco song) =

1997 single by Monaco

Single by Monaco

from the album Music for Pleasure
- B-side: "Bicycle Thief", "Ultra"
- Released: 24 February 1997
- Length: 4:07
- Label: Polydor
- Songwriters: Peter Hook, David Potts
- Producers: Peter Hook, David Potts

Monaco singles chronology
"What Do You Want from Me?" (1997)	"Sweet Lips" (1997)

"What Do You Want from Me?" is a song by New Order bassist Peter Hook's band Monaco, released as their debut single. The song is about Hook's failed relationship with comedian Caroline Aherne. Released in February 1997 from the band's debut album, Music for Pleasure (1997), the song peaked at number 11 on the UK Singles Chart and became a top-30 rock hit in both Canada and the United States. The band released two further singles from the album, but this remains the most successful. A music video was also shot for the song.

== Critical reception ==
British magazine Music Week rated the song four out of five, adding, "Sounding like New Order with smiling faces, this first offering from Peter Hook and guitarist David Potts' partnership is a bright pop affair with those unmistakable Hook bass lines." David Sinclair from The Times described it as "a song blatantly redolent of New Order, yet charmingly so."

== Music video ==
The music video for the song features group members Peter Hook and David Potts entering a fancy casino along with many other glamorous people, including two women who appear to be with the both of them, plus two gothic-looking characters (male and female), a dwarf, and a glamorous-looking woman. As Potts plays roulette with a group of people, Hook plays his bass and sings beneath the glass table. Just before the chorus, Hook appears outside and Potts assists in singing the chorus from underneath the glass. Later on, two back-up singers also appear underneath the glass. At another table, a dealer hands Hook some cards. He sneaks a peek at them as he sings. When he wins, the dwarf, along with many other people, appear at the table. The dwarf jumps up and down, cheering. The band then appear in a white room performing the song and also at what appears to be the front of the casino. The guests continue to enjoy themselves and the glamorous looking woman who entered with the dwarf throws something away in the trash. The dwarf appears in another part of the casino playing the featured piano solo while the gothic-looking man sits with the gothic-looking woman. He gestures to her as if to say he needs to be excused and goes off with the glamorous-looking woman as his former date looks on. Later on, a man grabs a woman's behind and she shoos him away while the back-up singers sing in to a microphone in another part of the casino. A woman kisses the dwarf on the head and another man has a drink poured on him by a woman as the band continues to play in the white room. At the end, the four women featured in the video leave the hotel smiling and Hook and Potts follow them out.

== Track listings ==
- UK, Australian, and Japanese CD single
1. "What Do You Want from Me?" – 3:54
2. "Bicycle Thief" – 3:59
3. "Ultra" – 8:05
4. "What Do You Want from Me?" (instrumental) – 4:36
- UK 7-inch and cassette single
1. "What Do You Want from Me?" – 3:54
2. "Bicycle Thief" – 3:59

== Charts ==
=== Weekly charts ===
Chart (1997)	Peak position
Australia (ARIA)	75
Belgium (Ultratip Bubbling Under Flanders)	18
Canada Rock/Alternative (RPM)	13
Europe (Eurochart Hot 100)	39
Germany (GfK)	87
Iceland (Íslenski Listinn Topp 40)	36
Netherlands (Dutch Top 40 Tipparade)	5
Netherlands (Single Top 100)	60
Scottish Singles Sales (Official Charts)	9
Sweden (Sverigetopplistan)	40
UK Singles (Official Charts)	11
US Hot 100 Airplay (Billboard)	61
US Modern Rock Tracks (Billboard)	24

=== Year-end charts ===
Chart (1997)	Position
UK Singles (OCC)	180

== Release history ==
Region	Date	Format(s)	Label(s)	Ref.
United Kingdom	24 February 1997	7-inch vinyl; CD; cassette	Polydor	
Japan	21 May 1997	CD	Polydor	
United States	15 July 1997	Contemporary hit radio	Polydor	
