= Ad infinitum (disambiguation) =

Ad infinitum is a Latin tag indicating perpetual repetition of a theme. Ad Infinitum may also refer to:

- Ad Infinitum (British band)
- Ad Infinitum (Swiss band)
- Argumentum ad infinitum, another Latin phrase referring to a logical fallacy
- Ad Infinitum (video game), 2023
- A (Ad Infinitum), a 2021 Indian film
