= Munich (disambiguation) =

Munich (German: München) is the capital of the German state of Bavaria.

Munich or München may also refer to:

== Places ==
- Munich (district), adjacent to the capital city
- München, a quarter of Bad Berka, Thuringia
- München, a quarter of Hirschbach, Bavaria
- München, a quarter of Hutthurm, Bavaria
- München, a quarter of Uebigau-Wahrenbrück, Brandenburg
- Munich, North Dakota, a city in the United States

== Arts and entertainment ==
- Munich (2005 film), a Steven Spielberg film based on the 1972 Olympic massacre and its aftermath
- Munich – The Edge of War, a 2021 British drama film based on the novel by Robert Harris
- Munich, a 2017 novel by Robert Harris
- "Munich" (song), a 2005 song by British rock group Editors
- "Munich", a 2012 song by the Fray from Scars & Stories
- "Munich", a poem by Patti Smith from her 1978 book Babel

== Ships ==
- SMS München, a Bremen-class cruiser of the Imperial German Navy
- MS München, a German LASH carrier, lost in a storm in December 1978
- SS General von Steuben, a German luxury passenger ship, renamed from München in 1930

== Sports ==
- FC Bayern Munich, a sports club located in the capital city
- TSV 1860 Munich, a sports club also known for its football team
- Munich (sport shoes), a Spanish company and brand specialized in sports and fashion shoes

== Other uses ==
- Munich, a common shorthand for Munich Agreement, the 1938 accord ceding the Sudetenland to Germany
- Munich Group is a diplomatic initiative in the Middle East
- Alphonse Munchen (1850–1917), engineer and politician from Luxembourg
- Munich air disaster, the crash of an aircraft carrying British footballers at Munich-Riem Airport in 1958
- Munich putsch 1923, also known as Hitler's Beer Hall Putsch
- Munich massacre, a 1972 Palestine Liberation Organization terrorist attack against Israeli athletes at the Olympics
- Munich Security Conference, an international political forum
- Munich Mouser, a cat

== See also ==
- Mnichov (disambiguation)
- Monaco (disambiguation)
