= Lavolta Lakota =

- Origin: Manchester, England
- Genres: Post-punk
- Years active: 1982–1985
- Label: Factory Benelux
- Past members: Jed Duffy; Davyth Hicks; Michael Eastwood; Guy Ainsworth; Ash Major; Mike Simii; Peter Flanagan

Lavolta Lakota were a British post-punk band, formed in 1982 by Davyth (Dave) Hicks, later a member of Revenge, Mikey Eastwood, and Jed Duffy, a former member of Stockholm Monsters. Lavolta was notable for having two bass players. They released one single "Prayer" on Factory Benelux. Lavolta split in 1985.

The band were produced by Peter Hook from New Order. The original lineup was Davyth (a.k.a. Dave) Hicks (vocals, guitar), Jed Duffy (bass), Michael Eastwood (bass), and Peter Flanagan (drums), later replaced by Guy Ainsworth (drums). Later members included Ash Major (guitar) and Mike Simii. The band played many live shows, touring with the Death Cult, New Order, The Fall, The Gun Club, and Play Dead.

The band's single, "Prayer"/"Mitawin", was released on Factory Benelux in July 1984 (FBN 34), produced by Hook (as "BeMusic," a name used by New Order members for production and session work). Despite plans for a second single, the band split in 1985. The track "Nightmare" was released on the Pleasantly Surprised cassette compilation The Angels Are Coming (PS 002).

Hicks went on to form Revenge with Peter Hook.
