= Mnichov =

Mnichov may refer to places:

== Germany ==
- Munich, a city called Mnichov in Czech and Slovak

== Czech Republic ==
- Mnichov (Cheb District), a municipality and village in the Karlovy Vary Region
- Mnichov (Domažlice District), a municipality and village in the Plzeň Region
- Mnichov (Strakonice District), a municipality and village in the South Bohemian Region
- Mnichov, a village and part of Libčeves in the Ústí nad Labem Region
- Mnichov, a village and part of Velké Chvojno in the Ústí nad Labem Region
- Mnichov, a village and part of Vrbno pod Pradědem in the Moravian-Silesian Region
- Mírová, a municipality and village in the Karlovy Vary Region, known as Mnichov until 1955

== See also ==
- Mnichovice
- Munich (disambiguation)
