= Temper Temper (Temper Temper album) =

Studio album by Temper Temper
- Released: 1991
- Recorded: 1991
- Genre: Soul; dance
- Label: Virgin
- Producer: Tim Oliver; Mick Moran

Temper Temper is the only album by British music act Temper Temper, consisting of Eric Gooden and singer Melanie Williams. The album was released in 1991 and contains the single "Talk Much" which peaked at No. 94 on the UK Singles Chart.

== Track listing ==
1. "Talk Much"
2. "First Impressions"
3. "Like We Used To"
4. "Temperance"
5. "Don't Wanna Have to Ask You"
6. "Happy Days"
7. "It's All Outta Lovin' You"
8. "Stop on By"
9. "Sweet as Can Be"
10. "Beg or Plead"

== Personnel ==
- Andrew Williams – organ, vocals
- Chris Manis – percussion
- Doreen Edwards – background vocals
- Eric Gooden – engineer, keyboards, producer, vocals, background vocals
- Fritz McIntyre – organ, background vocals
- Joe Roberts – vocals
- Melanie Williams – vocals, background vocals
- Mick Moran – percussion, producer
- Nick Garside – engineer
- Stephen Boyce-Buckley – string arrangements, keyboards, engineer
- Sylvan Richardson – bass
- Temper Temper – main performer
- Tim Oliver – engineer, producer
- Tony Henry – guitar
- Trevor Taylor – guitar
- Yvonne Shelton – background vocals
