= Dark Flower =

Dark Flower was the pop duo of Melanie Williams and Joe Roberts, which was founded in 2001. Williams and Roberts previously had hits independently on the UK Singles Chart. Dark Flower later became Bodhi.
