= Shergold Marathon =

Guitar Range

The Shergold Marathon was a range of guitars and basses produced by the Shergold Woodcrafts Ltd. company. These models were produced in 4,5,6 and 8 string models.

== The Marathon bass ==
The Marathon bass had three main scale lengths. For the standard 4-string bass, the scale length measures at 34 inches, whilst the 6 string model measured at 30 inches with a neck width some 5mm wider than that of the 4-string model. The 8-string model used the same scale length and neck width as the 4-string model.

The bass came in 5 colours, including a sunburst colour, black, cherry red, white and a 'natural' finish. Left handed models were also produced at an additional cost.

This bass came in a number of different formats over the years of production, mostly including different electronics configurations.

Mark I basses, were the earliest form of the Marathon. These typically feature stereo wiring and circuitry, with a humbucker pick-up and for earlier models a toggle switch, allowing for use in both stereo and mono configurations. This model is highly identifiable, as the bass only featured a single stereo output, which needed the use of a splitter cable. Some bassists later modified the internal electronics to bypass this and allowed them to run the bass on a single mono output.

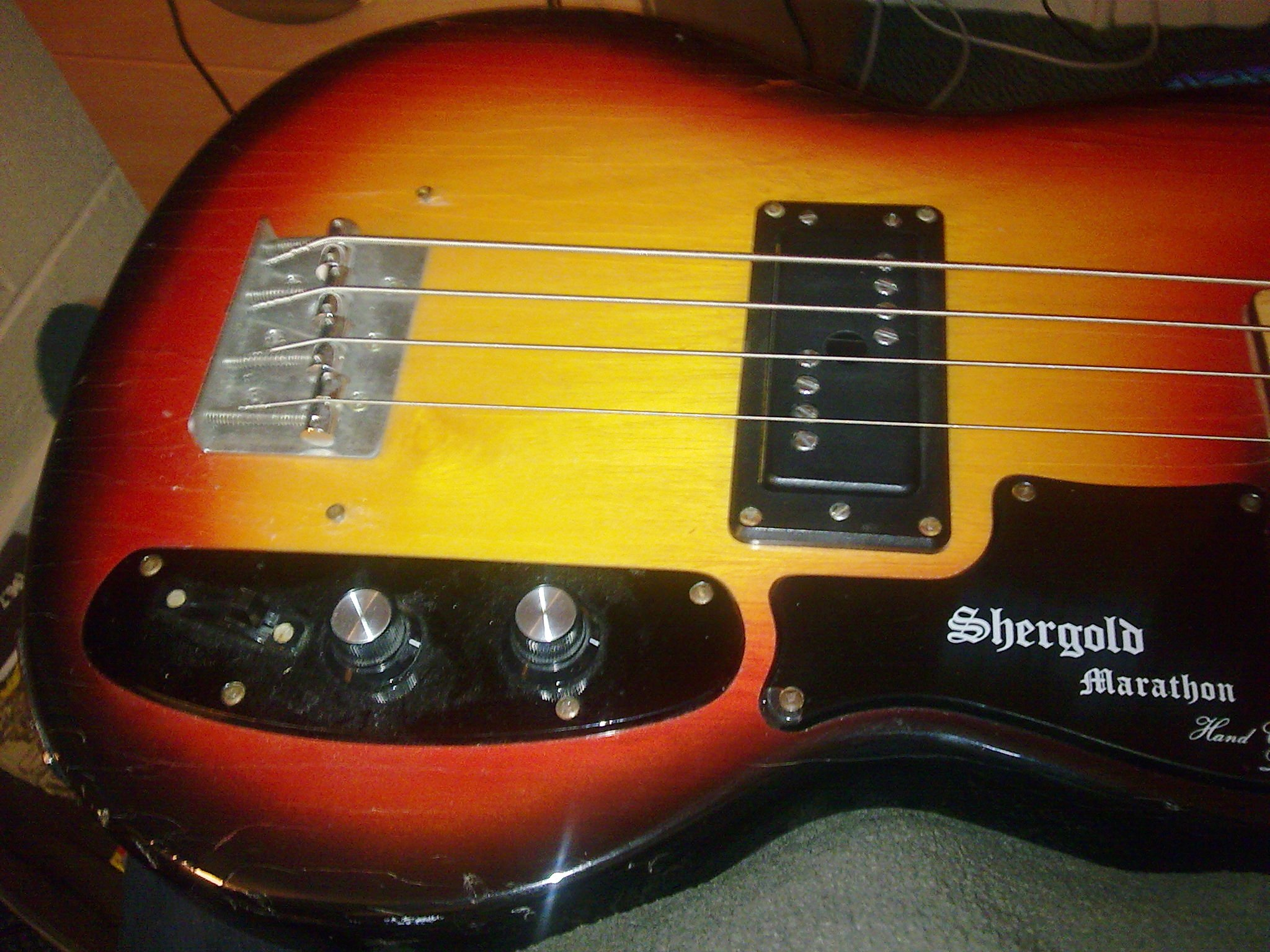
Shergold Marathon mk.1 4 String Bass Guitar

The Mark Ia Marathon has much the same features as the Mark I, however the stereo connection port favoured in the Mark I has been replaced by a dual mono output, allowing the user to bi-amp the bass if needed. It also solved the problem of low output, a problem often found in the stereo Mark I models.

In the image there is a Marathon Mark 1 4 String Bass Guitar. It has the stereo switch clearly visible on the left hand side of the control area, and the "shergold peel" effect is evident. The model shown has a single stereo output, indicating that it is a Mark 1, not a Mark 1a.

A small number of Mark II basses were also produced before full scale production was closed down in 1982. These typically featured a rosewood bolt-on neck and mahogany body and a single mono 16 pole pick-up.

== Marathon basses produced after 1992 ==
After the closure of the Shergold company in 1992 some basses were produced by individual luthiers using left-over parts and electronics. However no official records were kept and so for identification purposes these basses are also classified as official Marathon basses.

== Notable Marathon players ==
These include Peter Hook, who is believed to have three Shergolds, including at least 2 6 string models as he and son, Jack Bates perform simultaneously on Marathon 6 strings with the band Peter Hook and The Light.

== External links and references ==
- http://www.shergoldguitars.co.uk Shergold official site.
- https://www.shergold.co.uk/models.html#Marathon General information on the Marathon and all other instruments made by Shergold.
- https://web.archive.org/web/20110527045441/http://www.shergold.co.uk/imgviewer.html?class=circuits&name=Marathon-4.gif&returnto=models.html Wiring diagram for Shergold Marathon 4 string model.
