= Revenge (British band) =

British band

- Origin: Manchester, England
- Genres: Alternative rock; alternative dance; industrial rock
- Years active: 1989–1995
- Labels: Factory Records, LTM
- Members: Peter Hook; Davyth Hicks; Chris Jones; David Potts; Brian Whittaker; Mike Hedges

Revenge was a band formed by New Order bassist Peter Hook (vocals, bass, keyboards) and Lavolta Lakota and Rawhead singer Davyth Hicks (aka Dave Hicks) on guitar and vocals, together with Chris Jones (keyboards). Revenge formed during New Order's hiatus in 1989–1990. After their industrial rock/house music hybrid album One True Passion was written and recorded, the band was joined on stage by David Potts (bass and guitar) and Ashley Taylor on drums.

The band toured the first album worldwide playing gigs in Europe, North and South America and Japan in 1991. It was after the Japan tour that Hicks decided to leave.

In May 1991 the band recruited Brian Whittaker (bass and guitar) and Mike Hedges (drums) who debuted at the Cities in The Park Festival. After completion of touring and promoting New Order's 1993 album Republic, Hook returned to Revenge. However, the band soon disintegrated and Hook formed Monaco with David Potts.

== Discography ==
=== Albums ===
- One True Passion (1990)
- One True Passion V2.0 (2004), later re-released with a bonus CD, Be Careful What You Wish For, with a total of 23 additional tracks; V2.0 has more than three times as many tracks as the original release.
- No Pain No Gain (2005), live material recorded in 1991

=== Singles ===
Title	Release date	UK Singles Chart	U.S. Club Play	U.S. Club Sales	U.S. Modern Rock	Album
"7 Reasons"	November 1989	-	-	-	-	-
"Pineapple Face"	May 1990	-	10	16	8	One True Passion
"Slave"	October 1990	-	25	39	-	One True Passion
"State of Shock" (Club promo)	March 1992	-	42	-	-	Gun World Porn

=== Extended plays ===
- Gun World Porn (EP, 1991)
