= Midnight Awake =

Studio album by Adrian Snell
- Released: 1983
- Genre: Folk/Rock/Gospel
- Label: Marshall MRT1997
- Producer: Ray Nenow

Adrian Snell chronology
The Virgin (1981)	Midnight Awake (1983)	Feed the Hungry Heart (1984)

Midnight Awake is the title of the eighth solo album by British singer-songwriter Adrian Snell. It was released in 1983.

== Track listing ==
=== Side one ===
1. "Who's Laughing Now" (Adrian Snell/Tom Douglas)
2. "Still Your Heart" (Adrian Snell/Tom Douglas)
3. "Light on the Road" (Adrian Snell/Phil Thomson)
4. "Rejoice" (Adrian Snell/Tom Douglas)
5. "Shelter From the Storm" (Adrian Snell)

=== Side two ===
1. "Start Over" (Adrian Snell/Tom Douglas)
2. "Heart of the Father" (Adrian Snell/Tom Douglas)
3. "Come in From the World" (Adrian Snell/Phil Thomson)
4. "Midnight Awake" (Adrian Snell/Barry Crompton)
5. "Fill My Life" (Adrian Snell/Tom Douglas)

== Personnel ==
- Adrian Snell: Vocals, Keyboards and Synthesizer
- Joe English: Drums
- Tim Smith: Bass and Backing vocals
- John Lawry: Keyboards and Synthesizer
- George Cocchini: Guitar
- Norman Barratt: Guitar
- Terry Rowley: Guitar
- Alician McInnes: Backing vocals
- Mo Stanway: Backing vocals
- Barry Crompton: Backing vocals
- Tom Douglas: Backing vocals
- John Pac: Backing vocals
- Donnie Sanders: Saxophone

== Production notes ==
- Produced by Ray Nenow
- Executive producer John Pac
- Engineered by Joe Wilson, Colin Owen and Terry Rowley
- Mixed by Bob Clark
- String arrangements by Tim Smith
- Arrangements by Tim Smith and John Lawry
