= Monégasque =

Monégasque may refer to:

- Monégasque dialect, the local Ligurian dialect of Monaco
- Things or people from, or related to Monaco
  - Demographics of Monaco

== See also ==
- Les Monégasques (disambiguation)
