= Melanie Williams =

British singer

Melanie Williams (born 28 October 1964) is a British singer. She sang on the hit single "Ain't No Love (Ain't No Use)" alongside the Manchester-based electronic group Sub Sub.

== Career ==
Williams was a friend of Sub Sub at the time, and the band, searching for a female guest vocalist, featured her vocals. This helped expose her talents to the public, and was followed by further critical success.

Williams and her writing colleague Eric Gooden founded Square One Studios in Bury, Greater Manchester. The proprietor Trevor Taylor, liked what he heard and they began recording a string of tracks assisted by house engineer and musician Stephen Boyce-Buckley. They released the single "Showdown" under the name No Sovereign on Geffen Records in 1987, and subsequently landed a recording contract with 10 Records; a sub-division of Virgin Records. They released a self-titled album as the duo Temper Temper in 1991.

Williams launched a solo career in 1994 as a soul/dance singer, signed to Columbia Records. Her debut solo single, "All Cried Out!" peaked at No. 60 on the UK Singles Chart. The follow-up, "Everyday Thang", did better, hitting the UK top 40, peaking at No. 38. Her next single, the ballad "Not Enough?" managed a No. 65 chart placing. Her debut album, Human Cradle, failed to reach the UK Albums Chart.

Williams has also featured on the Adrian Snell album, Father, in which she read Psalm 139.

Early in 1995, Williams returned to the UK top 40 with a cover of "You Are Everything" (a duet with Joe Roberts). The song reached No. 28. Williams and Roberts teamed up again in 2001 and released the album Feed My Soul as Dark Flower. They re-teamed in 2007 to release the single "Mire" as Bodhi. They then changed their name to Butterfly Jam and released the album Bodhi in 2011 and the single "Wag" in 2014.

The Other Two's second album, Super Highways, featured Williams on some tracks as co-writer and guest vocalist.

== Discography ==
=== Albums ===
Solo

- Human Cradle (1994)

As Temper Temper

- Temper Temper (1991)

As Dark Flower

- Feed My Soul (2001)

As Butterfly Jam

- Bodhi (2011)

=== Album appearances ===
- Adrian Snell - Father (reading of Psalm 139) (1990)
