= Ain't No Love (Ain't No Use) =

1993 single by Sub Sub

- UK and Australian artwork

Single by Sub Sub featuring Melanie Williams
- Released: 29 March 1993
- Genre: Dance; disco
- Length: 5:17 (original mix); 2:47 (radio edit)
- Label: Rob's
- Songwriters: Jez Williams; Jimi Goodwin; Andy Williams; Melanie Williams
- Producer: Sub Sub

Sub Sub singles chronology
"Space Face" (1991)	"Ain't No Love (Ain't No Use)" (1993)	"Respect" (1994)

Alternative cover
- European artwork

Music video
- "Ain't No Love (Ain't No Use)" on YouTube

"Ain't No Love (Ain't No Use)" is a song by British dance music act Sub Sub, released as a standalone single on 29 March 1993 by independent label Rob's Records. It was later included on Sub Sub's debut album, Full Fathom Five (1994), and features Temper Temper's Melanie Williams on vocals. The song was the act's biggest single, reaching number three on the UK Singles Chart and number one on the UK Dance Singles Chart; it became one of many dance singles in 1993 to cross over into mainstream popularity in the UK.

In the single's accompanying music video, Jimi Goodwin plays bass, Jez Williams plays keyboards and percussion, and Jez' twin brother Andy Williams plays keytar. After struggling to repeat the success of the single, and after a fire destroyed the band's Ancoats studio in 1996, Sub Sub eventually reformed with a radically different sound as Doves in 1998.

== Background and release ==
The song features a sample of "Good Morning Starshine" by Revelation, a record Andy Williams owned because he won it at a fair as a teenager. Jimi Goodwin learned to play the bassline on a Roland Juno-106 keyboard, and the whole track came together quickly. There is also another well-known sample on there, but it has never been officially known what it is, only that it is a sound, rather than a song.

"I made a pact years ago that I would never complain about the song – however many times I had to sing it – or get upset about people not knowing other things that I've done, because it was such a privilege to be a part of."

— Melanie Williams talking about the song.

Seeking a vocalist, the band contacted singer Melanie Williams (no relation to the band members) from the soul band Temper Temper, who was dating Jimi's best friend, Joe Roberts. Melanie Williams also wrote the third verse for the song. The track was then recorded at Revolution Studios in Manchester. Sub Sub's manager Dave Rofe, Rob's Records' Pete Robinson and North South's promoter Karen Hampton were targeting BBC Radio 1 DJ Pete Tong to give the song a listen, which resulted in the song having a major boost in popularity. The band and Williams also performed the song on the British music chart television programme Top of the Pops after they were the highest new entry at number ten on the UK Singles Chart. The single sold in 700,000 copies and peaked at number three in April 1993.

== Critical reception ==
Tom Ewing of Freaky Trigger complimented the song as "excellent" and "tune-heavy, hands-high dance-pop". Katrine Ring from Danish Gaffa felt that "it is almost like hearing Deee-Lite. Grooovey!" In his weekly UK chart commentary, James Masterton said, "A hit almost before it had ever started, this track popular not only in the clubs but also extremely radio friendly. A timely piece of production as well with the Philly-sounding strings and wah-wah guitar making the track sound as if it is straight out of the 1970s. Disco returns with a 90s flavour I suppose and Top 3 is almost guaranteed." Chris Roberts from Melody Maker wrote, "Slim volume of metropolitan soul, slick as a Ming vase, graced by the Gold Blends ads-scripted-by-Mishima voice of Melanie Williams, previously with the criminally underrated Temper Temper. Trembles becomingly in the slipstream of Candi Staton and the Source's 'You Got the Love'." A reviewer from The Mix praised it as "great". Pan-European magazine Music & Media commented, "The arrangements are smoothly funky and combined with a voice that soothes like honey and rings like a bell, you can feel that real party enthusiasm which is so reminiscent of late '70s disco." The song was also described as "70s disco in a trendy club style".

Andy Beevers from Music Week said it "is something of a revelation – a fresh, funky and very different disco-influenced track with excellent catchy vocals. It has been generating a huge buzz in the clubs and should be a big hit." Ian McCann from NME wrote, "So: this is nicked from an old Evelyn 'Champagne' King record, it is disco, right down to the fast string breaks separating one section from the other, but my, is this a spendid item? Well, yes it is. Funky, irresistibly dancesational, terrific vocal [...], with a suitably empty lyric, and the Hey, what's happenin' bits just make it all the more marvellous. Top disco stretch satin boob tube of the week, and no mistake." Another NME editor, Mandi James, felt the track "grinds to a P-Funk hustle, replete with creamy guitars and hot, hot vocal courtesy of Temper Temper's Melanie Williams." James Hamilton from the Record Mirror Dance Update described it as a "smash-bound jaunty leaper like Deee-Lite combining Eric Burdon & War's 'Spill the Wine' with Marvin Gaye's 'Got to Give It Up'". Siân Pattenden from Select wrote, "Deny that Sub Sub's 'Ain't No Love' was one of the best records of the couple of years and we shall be forever consigned to the Devil's cloakroom duty when it comes to come-uppances."

== Chart performance ==
"Ain't No Love (Ain't No Use)" reached top five in the United Kingdom, where it peaked at number three during its third week on the UK Singles Chart, on 18 April 1993. The single spent six weeks inside the UK top 10. On both the Music Week Dance Singles chart and Record Mirror Club Chart, it was even more successful, reaching the number one position. It was a top-20 hit in Ireland and the Netherlands, as well as on the Eurochart Hot 100, where it peaked at number 11 in May 1993. "Ain't No Love (Ain't No Use)" was also a hit in Belgium, where it reached number 47. Outside Europe, it charted in Australia, peaking at number 11 and in Israel, where it reached number 26. The single earned a silver record in the UK, after 200,000 units were shipped there.

== Impact and legacy ==
The Face ranked "Ain't No Love (Ain't No Use)" number eight in their list of "Singles of the Year". NME ranked it number 23, while Select ranked it number 25 in their "Singles of the Year" lists. Robert Dimery featured it in his 2013 book, 1,001 Songs You Must Hear Before You Die as part of the "10,001 songs to download" list. Australian music TV channel Max included "Ain't No Love (Ain't No Use)" in their list of "1000 Greatest Songs of All Time" in 2012.

== Track listings ==
- UK and Australian CD single, Australian cassette single
1. "Ain't No Love (Ain't No Use)" (radio edit)
2. "Ain't No Love (Ain't No Use)" (original mix)
3. "Ain't No Love (Ain't No Use)" (Parkside mix)
4. "Ain't No Love (Ain't No Use)" (On the House mix)
- UK 7-inch and cassette single
1. "Ain't No Love (Ain't No Use)" (original edit)
2. "Ain't No Love (Ain't No Use)" (Parkside mix)
- UK 12-inch single

A1. "Ain't No Love (Ain't No Use)" (original mix)
B1. "Ain't No Love (Ain't No Use)" (Parkside mix)
B2. "Ain't No Love (Ain't No Use)" (Parkside raw dub)

- UK 12-inch single—On remixes
1. "Ain't No Love (Ain't No Use)" (On the Floor)
2. "Ain't No Love (Ain't No Use)" (On the House)
3. "Ain't No Love (Ain't No Use)" (On Yer Face)
- French CD single
1. "Ain't No Love (Ain't No Use)" (radio edit) – 2:46
2. "Ain't No Love (Ain't No Use)" (Parkside mix) – 7:43
- Australian CD and cassette single—remixes
1. "Ain't No Love (Ain't No Use)" (Rubber Band mix)
2. "Ain't No Love (Ain't No Use)" (original 12-inch mix)
3. "Ain't No Love (Ain't No Use)" (Parkside raw dub mix)
4. "Ain't No Love (Ain't No Use)" (radio edit)

== Charts ==
=== Weekly charts ===
Weekly chart performance for "Ain't No Love (Ain't No Use)"
Chart (1993)	Peak position
Australia (ARIA)	11
Belgium (Ultratop 50 Flanders)	47
Europe (Eurochart Hot 100)	11
Europe (European Dance Radio)	12
Ireland (IRMA)	13
Israel (Israeli Singles Chart)	26
Netherlands (Dutch Top 40)	25
Netherlands (Single Top 100)	18
UK Singles (Official Charts)	3
UK Airplay (Music Week)	2
UK Club Chart (Music Week)	1
UK Dance (Music Week)	1
UK Indie (Music Week)	1

=== Year-end charts ===
Year-end chart performance for "Ain't No Love (Ain't No Use)"
Chart (1993)	Position
Australia (ARIA)	66
UK Singles (OCC)	41
UK Airplay (Music Week)	17
UK Club Chart (Music Week)	3

== Certifications ==
Certifications for "Ain't No Love (Ain't No Use)"
Region	Certification	Certified units/sales
Australia (ARIA)	Gold	35,000^{^}
United Kingdom (BPI)	Silver	200,000^{^}
^{^} Shipments figures based on certification alone.
