= Monaci =

Monaci is an Italian surname. Notable people with the surname include:

- Alberto Monaci (1941–2024), Italian banker and politician
- Maria Monaci Gallenga (1880–1944), Italian textile designer and fashion designer

== See also ==
- Lago dei Monaci
- Monaco (disambiguation)
