= Patrick Eggle =

British guitar designer and maker

Patrick James Eggle is a British guitar designer and luthier.

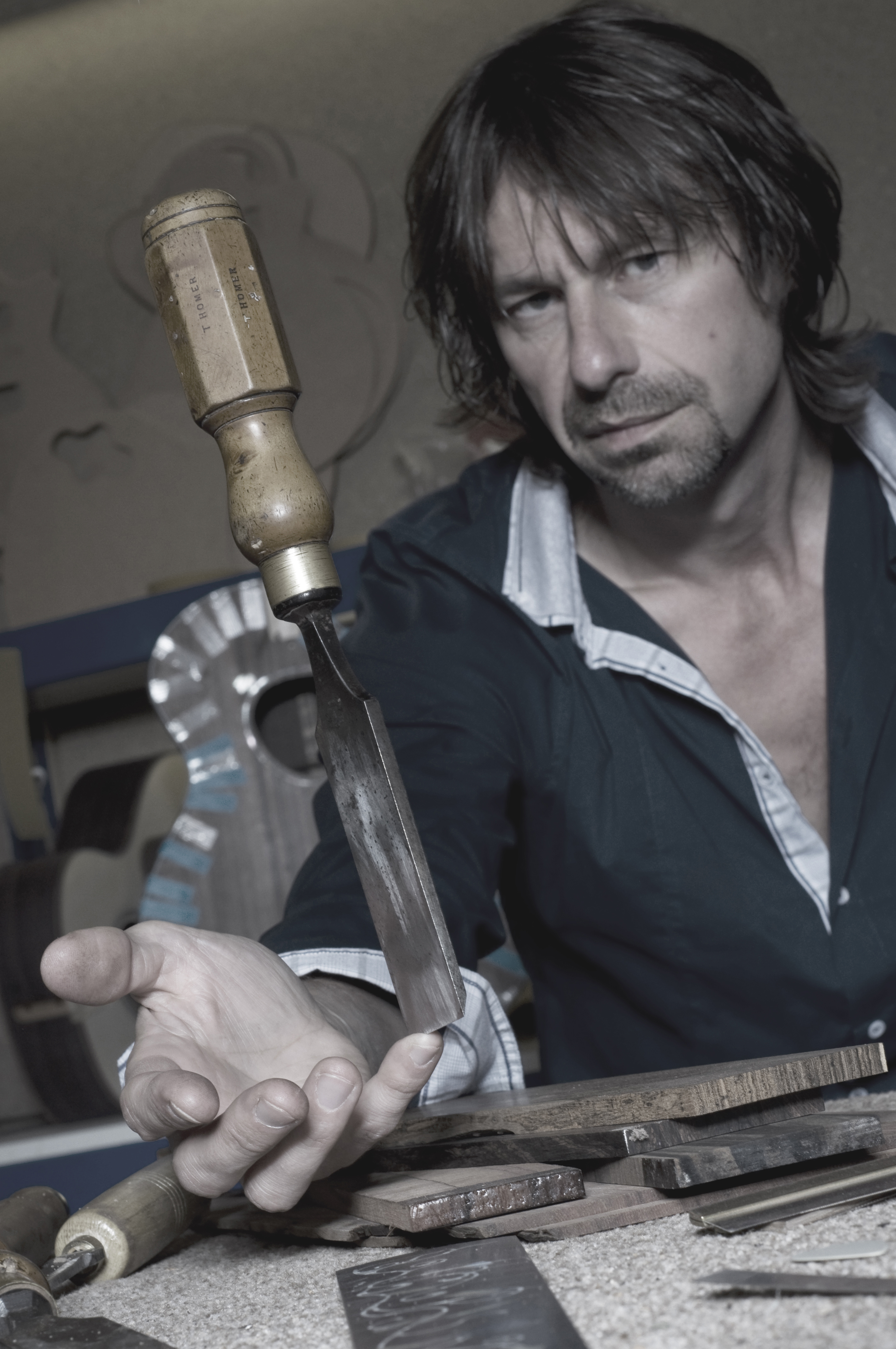
Patrick Eggle in 2016

The company he founded in the 1990s, Patrick Eggle Guitars, first based in Coventry and then in Birmingham, is known for designing and releasing such guitar ranges as the Berlin (1991) and the Fret King Espirit (1998). The company was producing 2,000 electric and acoustic guitars per year by the mid-1990s.

Eggle's guitars have been used by artists such as Tony Iommi, Brian May, Bruce Watson, Bill Nelson, Midge Ure, Tony Remy, Oliver Leiber, and Ali and Robin Campbell. On 11 April 2014, the "JS Berlin Legend" made for Rory Gallagher sold for £25,000 at auction.

Eggle left the company in 1994, and moved to the US to begin trading independently building acoustic and archtop guitars. In 2004 he returned to the UK, and started producing acoustic guitars from workshops in Oswestry under the brand name Patrick James Eggle Guitars. Notable artists of these guitars include guitarists such as Jake Bugg and Frank Turner. Turner played his custom made PJE guitar during his performance at the 2012 Summer Olympics.

During this time he was asked to re-develop and design the range of acoustic guitars for Faith Guitars. Various Eggle-designed models went on to be awarded 'The UK's Best Acoustic Guitar' Award at the MIA Music Awards every year from 2012 to 2016, including the Faith Venus Blood Moon in 2016.

In 2016, Eggle and his small team of craftsmen ceased producing acoustics and began focusing solely on building and developing his own line of electric guitars. These include models such as the 96 and Macon which were both awarded a rare 10/10 Gold rating by Guitarist magazine in 2017. Blues artist Krissy Matthews is a known player of the Macon.

In 2017, Eggle helped with the re-launch of the Shergold guitar brand by re-designing the Masquerader model shape, which is available with three pickup configurations and in four colour finishes.
