= Music for Pleasure (Monaco album) =

Studio album by Monaco
- Released: 9 June 1997
- Genre: Britpop, pop
- Length: 52:30 (56:22 US)
- Label: Polydor
- Producer: Peter Hook, David Potts

Monaco chronology
Music for Pleasure (1997)	Monaco (2000)

Professional ratings
Review scores
Source	Rating
AllMusic	4/5 stars
Music Week	4/5 stars
NME	4/10
Uncut	3/5 stars

Music for Pleasure is the debut studio album by rock band Monaco, a side project of New Order bassist Peter Hook. It was released in 1997 and reached No. 11 in the UK. The album sold more than 500,000 copies worldwide, with its first single, "What Do You Want from Me?", often mistaken for a New Order song. The band recorded the second self-titled album before dissolving in 2000.

"What Do You Want from Me?" was one of two hit singles in the UK. It reached No. 11 in March 1997, while "Sweet Lips" hit No. 18, in May.

The cover is designed by Peter Saville and the cover photograph was taken by Sam Taylor-Wood.

== Track listing ==
All songs by Peter Hook and David Potts.

1. "What Do You Want from Me?" – 4:09
2. "Shine" – 5:32
3. "Sweet Lips" – 4:11
4. "Buzz Gum" – 6:05
5. "Blue" – 2:40
6. "Junk" – 9:14
7. "Billy Bones" – 4:59
8. "Happy Jack" – 4:12
9. "Tender" – 4:34
10. "Under the Stars" - 3:52 (not on UK release)
11. "Sedona" – 6:54

("Sedona" ends at 5:50. After one minute of silence, a brief spoken message by Hook - "Oi! You can turn it off now." - plays, ends-up the album.)

== Personnel ==
- Peter Hook – bass guitar, vocals, keyboards
- David Potts – drums, guitar, keyboards, vocals, bass

== Charts ==
Chart performance for Music for Pleasure
Chart (1997)	Peak position
Australian Albums (ARIA)	127
Swedish Albums (Sverigetopplistan)	33
UK Albums (OCC)	11
