= Monaco (album) =

Studio album by Monaco
- Released: 21 August 2000
- Genre: Alternative rock, electronica, pop
- Length: 52:24
- Label: Papillon, Chrysalis
- Producer: Peter Hook, David Potts

Monaco chronology
Music for Pleasure (1997)	Monaco (2000)

Professional ratings
Review scores
Source	Rating
Allmusic	4/5 stars

Monaco is the second studio album by rock band Monaco, a side project of New Order bassist Peter Hook. It was released in 2000 and reached No. 84 in the UK. The album was provided 2 singles. The first single is "I've Got A Feeling", but later was rejected in the UK, due to sample clearances. The second single is "See-Saw”, as a limited 12" single.

When the album was recorded, their previous label Polydor Records rejected this album to be released, due to changing trends in music at the time. In a money saving move, the label opted to focus on more commercially successful artists. Papillon Records agreed to release the album, though the planned single release of "I've Got A Feeling" was recalled in the UK due to sample clearance issues. "See-Saw" was later released as a limited run 12" single. Despite favorable reviews, the album was released with little to no promotion, and has become a collectible item.

== Track listing ==
All songs by Peter Hook and David Potts.

1. "I've Got a Feeling" – 4:36
2. "A Life Apart" – 6:15
3. "Kashmere" – 5:06
4. "Bert's Theme" – 4:45
5. "Ballroom" – 5:37
6. "See-Saw" – 5:45
7. "Black Rain" – 4:02
8. "It's a Boy" – 5:06
9. "End of the World" – 4:51
10. "Marine" – 6:21
