= Monaco (name) =

Monaco is a surname. Notable people with the surname include:

- Juan Monaco (born 1984), Argentine tennis player
- Kara Monaco (born 1983), 2006 Playmate of the Year
- Kelly Monaco (born 1976), American model and actress
- Lorenzo Monaco (c. 1370 –c. 1425), Italian painter
- Mario del Monaco (1915–1982), Italian tenor
- Ron Monaco (born 1963), American football player
