= Ad Infinitum (British band) =

English musical group

- Origin: Manchester, England
- Genres: Synthpop; post-punk
- Years active: 1984
- Labels: Factory Records
- Past members: Lindsay Reade; Peter Hook; Andy Connell; Martin Moscrop; Eric Random

Ad Infinitum were an English musical group which were part of the Factory Records label. They were formed by Lindsay Reade, who was married to label manager Tony Wilson at the time. The group was composed of members of A Certain Ratio, and New Order bassist Peter Hook.

In 1984, the group recorded its sole single, a cover of the Joe Meek song "Telstar", with the B-side being "Telstar in a Piano Bar". The song had original lyrics written by Reade in its first version, which were rejected by Meek's publishers, and replaced by more abstract and unintelligible vocals. Lindsay Reade explained:

I knew it wouldn’t be a hit in that event. We salvaged things but it didn’t correspond to my vision at all. Hooky (Peter Hook) came in and remixed the whole track; it felt like a drastic haircut and sounded a bit disco when he’d finished. He put my voice through a Vocoder so the words couldn’t be distinguished. The sleeve was a bit state-of-the-art for its time. Each one had a hologram of a spaceship stuck to it. I’d managed to get a job lot of these holograms cheap. I called the band Ad Infinitum, inspired by something Tony had typed on the envelope of one of his letters.

This single was one of the first records with a holographic cover.
