= Adrian Snell =

English musician

Adrian Snell (born 1954) is an English pianist, keyboard player, singer and composer.

== Biography ==
Classically trained at the Leeds College of Music and with a music diploma to his name (LGSM), Snell's musical career spanned nearly four decades. During this time, he has produced twenty-three original albums: seventeen solo albums and six major concept works. His major commissions include: "The Virgin" from the BBC, "The Passion", recorded with the Royal Philharmonic Orchestra and premiered on BBC Radio One, "The Cry: A Requiem for the Lost Child", premiered at St Paul's Cathedral in aid of Save the Children, and numerous Dutch commissions including HTV's special musical documentary, Song of an Exile, recorded at Yad Vashem Holocaust Memorial, Jerusalem. He has performed in the United Kingdom, Israel, the United States, Australia, and throughout Europe, and has had many TV and radio performances worldwide.

In the late 1990s, Snell semi-retired as a professional musician to train as a music therapist. This was a bold move by an artist whose albums and concerts attracted audiences across Europe. He completed the post graduate diploma in Music Therapy (Dip. Mus. Th.) awarded by the University of Bristol through the Faculty of Medicine. He now works as a Music Therapist and Arts Therapy Consultant for children with special needs at Three Ways School, Bath, and regularly visits a school in Korce, Albania.

In June 1995, the release of Snell's major City of Peace was officially published. The work explores the Jewish roots of the Christian faith, drawing on poems written by Jewish authors spanning from six thousand years ago to the present day. City of Peace also comes as a climax to eleven years of searching and discovery that began with a journey into the lives of Jewish men, women, and children caught up in the Nazi Holocaust.

It is eleven years since I walked through the gates of Bergen Belsen. I shall never forget that day; it changed me in ways I couldn't have imagined. Music is, in the end, the language of my heart, so not surprisingly much of my writing since then expresses the search for answers and meaning in all that the Holocaust and Jewish history opens up in us. - Adrian Snell

Through his work as a music therapist, Snell drew inspiration to record another album, Fierce Love. The album draws inspiration both from the relationships he has formed, and the extraordinary range of instruments that are central to his work and now contribute to the unique soundscape of the album. Fierce Love was released on 28 September 2013.

== Discography ==
- Fireflake - (1975)
- Goodbye October - (1976)
- Listen to the Peace - (1978)
- Something New Under the Sun - (1979)
- The Passion - (1980)
- Cut - (1981)
- The Virgin - (1981)
- Adrian Snell Classics - (1982)
- Midnight Awake - (1983)
- Feed the Hungry Heart - (1984)
- The Collection 1975 - 1981 - (1986)
- Alpha and Omega - (1986)
- Cream of the Collection 1975 - 1981 - (1989)
- Song of an Exile - (1989)
- Father - (1990)
- Kiss the Tears - (1992)
- We Want to Live - (1992)
- Beautiful or What?! - (1993)
- Solo - (1994)
- City of Peace - Moriah - (1996)
- City of Peace - Part Two (My Every Breath) - (1996)
- My Heart Shall Journey - The Best of Adrian Snell - (1996)
- Light of the World - (1996)
- City of Peace - (1998 2 CD)
- Intimate Strangers - (1998)
- The Early Years 1975 - 1981 - (1998 3 CD)
- Poems Without Words / Seven Hills - (2000)
- I Dream of Peace - (2001)
- The Cry, a requiem for the lost child - (2003)
- Every Place is Under the Stars - (2006)
- Fierce Love - (2013)

=== Video albums ===
- Live at Flevo (Video Tape) - (1992)

== Bibliography ==
- Alpha and Omega: Study Guide - (1988)
- Children of Exile (with Jenny Robertson) - (1990)
- City of Peace - A Journey to the Roots of My Faith (with Charles Stewart) - (1996)
- Fierce Love: Music Leads a Lost Child Home (Sacristy Press, 2019)
