= Mnichov (Strakonice District) =

- Municipality
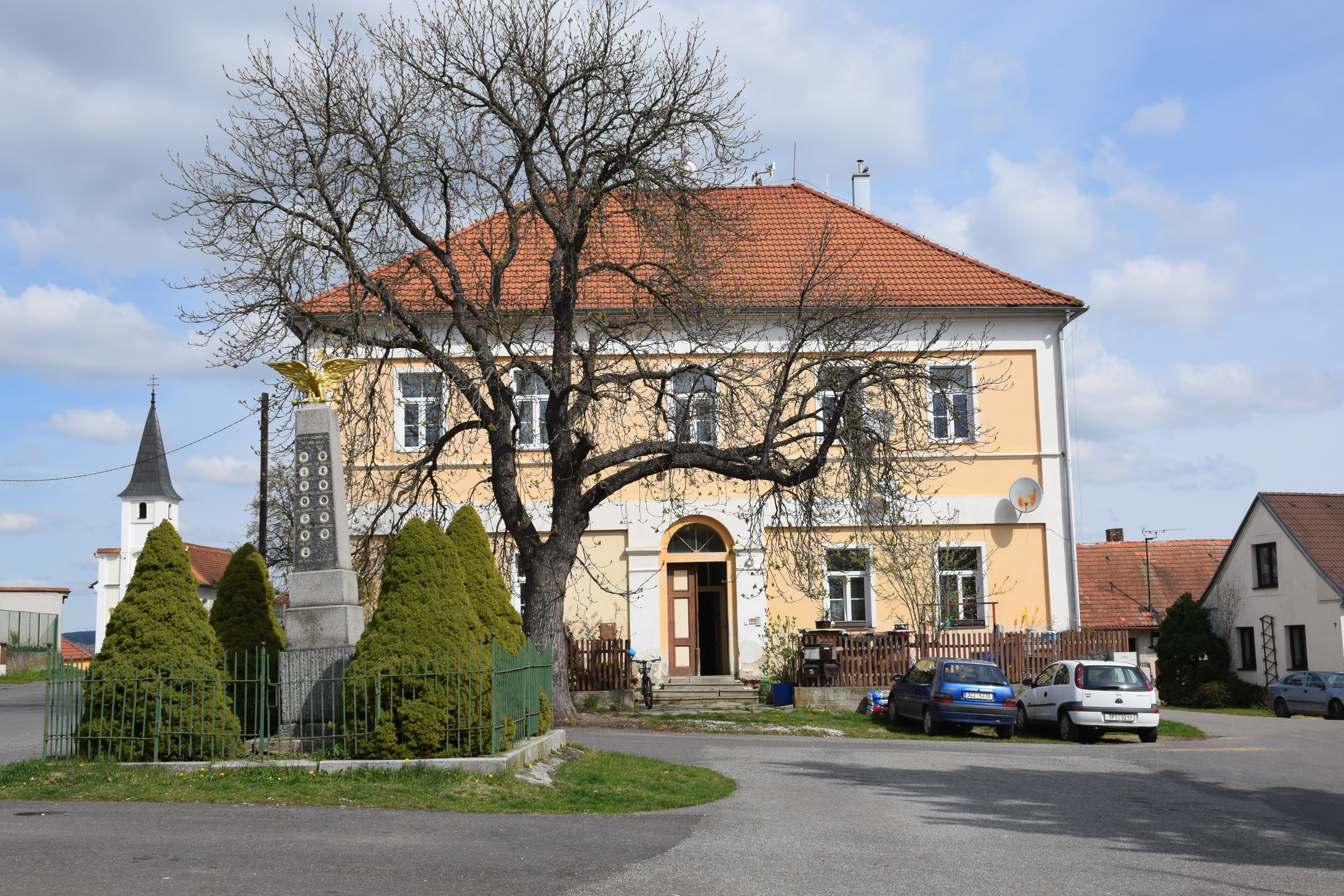
- World War I memorial in the centre of Mnichov

- Flag Coat of arms

- Location in the Czech Republic
- Coordinates: 49°18′8″N 13°49′48″E
- Country: Czech Republic
- Region: South Bohemian
- District: Strakonice
- First mentioned: 1243

Area
  - Total: 8.31 km^{2} (3.21 sq mi)
- Elevation: 454 m (1,490 ft)

Population (2026-01-01)
  - Total: 252
  - Density: 30.3/km^{2} (78.5/sq mi)
- Time zone: UTC+1 (CET)
  - Summer (DST): UTC+2 (CEST)
- Postal code: 386 01
- Website: www.mnichov.info

Mnichov is a municipality and village in Strakonice District in the South Bohemian Region of the Czech Republic. It has about 300 inhabitants.

Mnichov lies approximately 8 kilometres (5 mi) north-west of Strakonice, 61 km (38 mi) north-west of České Budějovice, and 97 km (60 mi) south-west of Prague.

== Demographics ==
Historical population
| Year | Pop. | ±% |
|---|---|---|
| 1869 | 626 | — |
| 1880 | 633 | +1.1% |
| 1890 | 592 | −6.5% |
| 1900 | 541 | −8.6% |
| 1910 | 560 | +3.5% |
| 1921 | 589 | +5.2% |
| 1930 | 577 | −2.0% |
| 1950 | 446 | −22.7% |
| 1961 | 441 | −1.1% |
| 1970 | 363 | −17.7% |
| 1980 | 304 | −16.3% |
| 1991 | 234 | −23.0% |
| 2001 | 219 | −6.4% |
| 2011 | 246 | +12.3% |
| 2021 | 247 | +0.4% |
Source: Censuses
