= Monaco (band) =

English rock band

- Origin: Manchester, Greater Manchester, England
- Genres: Alternative rock; post-punk; indie rock; alternative dance; house
- Years active: 1995–2000; 2019–present
- Labels: Polydor (1996–1999); Papillon (2000)
- Members: Peter Hook; Paul Kehoe; Andy Poole; David Potts

Monaco are an English rock band, originally formed in 1995 as a side project of New Order bassist Peter Hook, together with David Potts, the only remaining member of Hook's previous New Order side project, Revenge. The group is best known for the 1997 single "What Do You Want from Me?" and the album from which it was taken, Music for Pleasure, which sold over half a million copies. Hook, Potts and Kehoe currently perform together in Peter Hook and the Light.

In July 2019, Hook announced that the band were to return, performing a new Monaco track, "Higher, Higher, Higher Love" during Peter Hook and the Light's 'Joy Division Orchestrated' show at London's Royal Albert Hall.

== Debut album ==
Potts initially met Hook while working as a tape operator in his studio. He was later recruited to play guitar on Revenge's EP, Gun World Porn in 1992. After the breakup of Revenge, Hook and Potts reunited to form a more dance-oriented alternative group. Their first album, Music for Pleasure, was released in 1997. Some critics remarked on the similarities to New Order's sound, owing to Hook's recognisable bass style and the resemblance between Potts' vocal style and Bernard Sumner's. Three singles were released from the album: "What Do You Want from Me?", "Sweet Lips", and "Shine (Someone Who Needs Me)".

== Second album ==
In 1999, Polydor Records rejected Monaco's eponymous second album, due to changing trends in music. Papillon Records agreed to release the album, though the planned single release of "I've Got a Feeling" was recalled in the UK due to sample clearance issues. "See-Saw" was later released as a limited run 12" single. Despite favorable reviews, the album was released with little to no promotion, and has become a collectible item.

== Break-up, live reunions and The Light ==
In 2000, tensions mounted in the studio, partly due to Potts' dissatisfaction with the band's failure to depart from a New Order-like sound, and partly due to Potts' workload. Following what Potts called "a disastrous gig" at the Eclipse festival, Hook and Potts had a major argument. They both took a break, and after letting things cool down, they met and decided it was best to split up Monaco. Potts eventually went on to form RAM and released a solo album, Coming Up for Air. Meanwhile, Hook reunited with New Order, playing with them until 2007, and formed Freebass in 2007.

After the success of the Revenge reissues in 2005, Hook announced that he and Potts were working on similar Monaco reissues for release some time in 2007: however, the reissues were not released.

In March 2007, Hook and Potts performed Monaco songs together at the Hard Rock Cafe in Manchester under the name "Hooky & Pottsy". Original Monaco drummer Paul Kehoe also played along with Hook's son Jack. In October 2007, the same line up performed again as Monaco at the Ritz in Manchester which raised money for Oxfam.

In July 2013, it was announced that David Potts would be the new guitarist for the Light, Hook's new band, formed in 2009.

At a book signing in Bath, promoting Hook's New Order biography Substance, Hook revealed that he and Potts intended to reunite as Monaco in January 2017. However, at a similar event in 2017, Hook revealed the reunion was shelved, with Potts devoting time to his new baby.

== 2019 return ==
At the 'Joy Division Orchestrated' show at the Royal Albert Hall on 6 July 2019, Hook announced the return of Monaco, debuting their first new song in twenty years, "Higher, Higher, Higher Love".

"I've Got A Feeling" was finally released as a vinyl single in April 2025 as part of Record Store Day and reached No. 38 in the UK Physical Singles Chart and No. 75 in the UK Singles Sales Chart.

Both Monaco albums were reissued on coloured double vinyl by Music on Vinyl - Music For Pleasure appeared in 2024 with bonus tracks, while Monaco was released in 2025 with extra tracks and booklet.

== Discography ==
=== Studio albums ===
Year	Album details	Chart positions		
Year	Album details	UK	AUS	SWE
1997	Music for Pleasure: Released: 9 June 1997; Label: Polydor	11	127	33
2000	Monaco: Released: 21 August 2000; Label: Papillion/Chrysalis:EMI	84	–	–

=== Singles ===
Title	Release date	UK	AUS	US Mod. Rock	US Airplay	Album
"What Do You Want from Me?"	March 1997	11	75	24	61	Music for Pleasure
"Sweet Lips"	May 1997	18	131	—	—	Music for Pleasure
"Shine (Someone Who Needs Me)"	September 1997	55	—	—	—	Music for Pleasure
"I’ve Got a Feeling" (withdrawn in the UK)	July 2000	—	—	—	—	Monaco
"See-Saw" (limited vinyl 12" only release)	March 2001	—	—	—	—	Monaco
