= Mobin Master =

Australian DJ and producer

Mobin Master is an Australian DJ and producer. His version of the Robin S. song "Show Me Love" (August 2007) peaked at No. 7 on the ARIA Club Tracks chart and stayed in the top 50 for 52 weeks. It was nominated for the 2008 ARIA Award for Best Dance Release and reached No. 25 on ARIA's End of Year Top 50 Club Tracks chart in 2007.

Master is the owner of the Australian independent record label Safari Music.

== Discography ==
=== Albums ===
List of albums
Title	Album details
Get Lucky	Released: May 2010; Label: Central Station (DNA0051); Formats: CD, download

=== Compilation albums ===
List of albums
Title	Album details
Safari Music Volume One	Released: 2009; Label: Safari Music (SAFCD001); Formats: CD, download
In the Club Vol. 3 (with MYNC)	Released: 2011; Label: Ministry Of Sound (MOSA138); Formats: CD, download

=== Singles ===
Title	Year	Peak chart positions
Title	Year	AUS Club
"Tribal Funk Vol. 1"	2001	—
"Tribal Funk Vol. 2"	2002	—
"Tribal Funk Vol. 2"	2003	—
"Get Away with It" (Mobin Master Project featuring Karina Chavez)	2003	6
"Tribal Funk Vol. 4"	2004	—
"Fly" (featuring D'Empress)	2006	11
"Show Me Love" (featuring Karina Chavez)	2008	7
"Unique" (featuring Kim Cooper)	2008	—
"Don't Stop Movin'" (featuring Karina Chavez)	2009	—
"Where Will You Go" (with Royaal)	2012	—
"Lights Out" (with Ian Carey)	2012	—
"Ride on Time" (with Trillogee featuring Alfreda Gerald)	2016	—
"You Gotta Be" (featuring Kamatos)	2017	—
"Show Me Love (2018)"	2018	—
"Dreams" (featuring Polina)	2018	—
"Hide U" (featuring Frida Harnesk)	2020	—
"Sexy Foxx"	2020	—
"Take Me Back"	2020	—
"3 Fingers" (with Rubber People)	2021	—
"La Vida"	2021	—
"Unique" (featuring Kim Cooper)	2021	—
"We Love House"	2021	—
"How Do I Know?" (with Rubber People)	2021	—
"Ride on Time" (with Alfreda Gerald)	2021	—
"Ma Baker" (with Rubber People)	2021	—
"Are You Ready?"	2022	—
"Get Away with It"	2022	—

== Awards and nominations ==
=== ARIA Music Awards ===
The ARIA Music Awards is an annual awards ceremony that recognises excellence, innovation, and achievement across all genres of Australian music.

Year	Nominee / work	Award	Result
2008	"Show Me Love"	Best Dance Release	Nominated
