= Freebass =

English rock supergroup (2005–2010)

- Origin: United Kingdom
- Genres: Alternative rock
- Years active: 2005–2010
- Labels: Hacienda; 24 Hour Service Station
- Spinoff of: The Smiths; The Stone Roses; New Order; Joy Division; Primal Scream; Haven
- Past members: Peter Hook; Gary "Mani" Mounfield; Gary Briggs; Andy Rourke
- Website: Artist site

Freebass were an English rock supergroup consisting of, originally, three bassists - Andy Rourke (formerly of The Smiths), Peter Hook (formerly of Joy Division & New Order) and Gary "Mani" Mounfield (of The Stone Roses and Primal Scream) - and singer Gary Briggs (formerly of Haven). Rourke subsequently left the line-up.

The band's sound has been described as "a heady mix of modern rock, dub, and Northern soul".

== History ==
The concept of forming a band centered around three bass players emerged during a drunken night and was initiated by Hook and Mani as a reaction to their bands New Order and Primal Scream being stalled. In a late 2005 interview with NME Peter Hook stated that all of the songs have three basses: "Mani does the low part, Andy Rourke in the middle and I do the high bit ... it works out quite well". In 2006 the band recorded the theme song for the Channel 4 Radio program The Tube, an instrumental called "The Tower".

In a 2006 interview with Argentine newspaper Página/12, Hook expressed satisfaction with the band's progress, stating, "We've already written 17 tracks and [the album]'s coming along very well. We hope to finish it soon.". He also explained his determination to succeed. "The reason we decided to do it was because everyone laughed in our face when we suggested the idea. So we thought, 'Fuck them! We're gonna show them.'"

Having delayed the album for so long, in 2010 Hook launched a new website, worked out a distribution arrangement with American independent record label 24-Hour Service Station, and released the debut Freebass recording Two Worlds Collide EP, as a digital download in March 2010 and on CD in August. A full album, titled It's a Beautiful Life, was again initially released as a digital download in April 2010, and as an expanded edition CD with three additional tracks and a bonus instrumental versions disc, on 20 September by Essential for Europe, Australia and South East Asia; and 7 December by 24 Hour Service Station for the rest of the world.

The band's official website confirmed in August 2010 that Rourke was no longer part of the line-up, noting: "Andy Rourke was initially involved in the conception of the group and contributed to the EP and a few tracks on the LP. He is now living in NYC and will not be joining the band for live dates."

Andy Rourke died on 19 May 2023.

Gary “Mani” Mounfield died on 20 November 2025.

== Discography ==
=== Studio albums ===
- It's a Beautiful Life (2010), 24 Hour Service Station / Essential (Europe, Australia & SE Asia)

=== EPs ===
- Two Worlds Collide (2010), 24 Hour Service Station
- You Don't Know This About Me – The Arthur Baker Remixes (2010), 24 Hour Service Station
- Fritz von Runte vs Freebass Redesign (2010), 24 Hour Service Station
- Two Worlds Collide – The Instrumental Mixes (2010), 24 Hour Service Station

=== Singles ===
- "Live Tomorrow You Go Down" (2010), 24 Hour Service Station
