= Joe Roberts (musician) =

Joe Roberts is an English soul/dance singer, active in the 1990s.

Prior to Roberts starting to record with business and life-partner Melanie Williams, he also had solo hits with "Lover", "Back in My Life" and "Adore", originally by Prince on his Sign “☮” the Times album. Together with Williams, Roberts covered "You Are Everything", previously recorded by the Stylistics and later covered by Diana Ross and Marvin Gaye.

The 1995 single "Happy Days" with Sweet Mercy performed well on the UK Dance Chart, peaking at No. 8.

== Discography ==
=== Albums ===
- Looking for the Here and Now (1993), FFRR

=== Singles ===
- "Love Is Energy" (1992) - UK No. 81
- "Back in My Life" (1993) – UK No. 59
- "Lover" (1994) – UK No. 22
- "Back in My Life" (re-issue) (1994) – UK No. 39
- "Adore" (1994) – UK No. 45
- "Come Together" (1994)
- "You Are Everything" (1995) – UK No. 28 †
- "Happy Days" (1996) – UK No. 63 ‡
- "U Got the Love" (1997) ‡

† Melanie Williams and Joe Roberts
‡ Sweet Mercy featuring Joe Roberts
