= Peter Hook =

British bassist (born 1956)

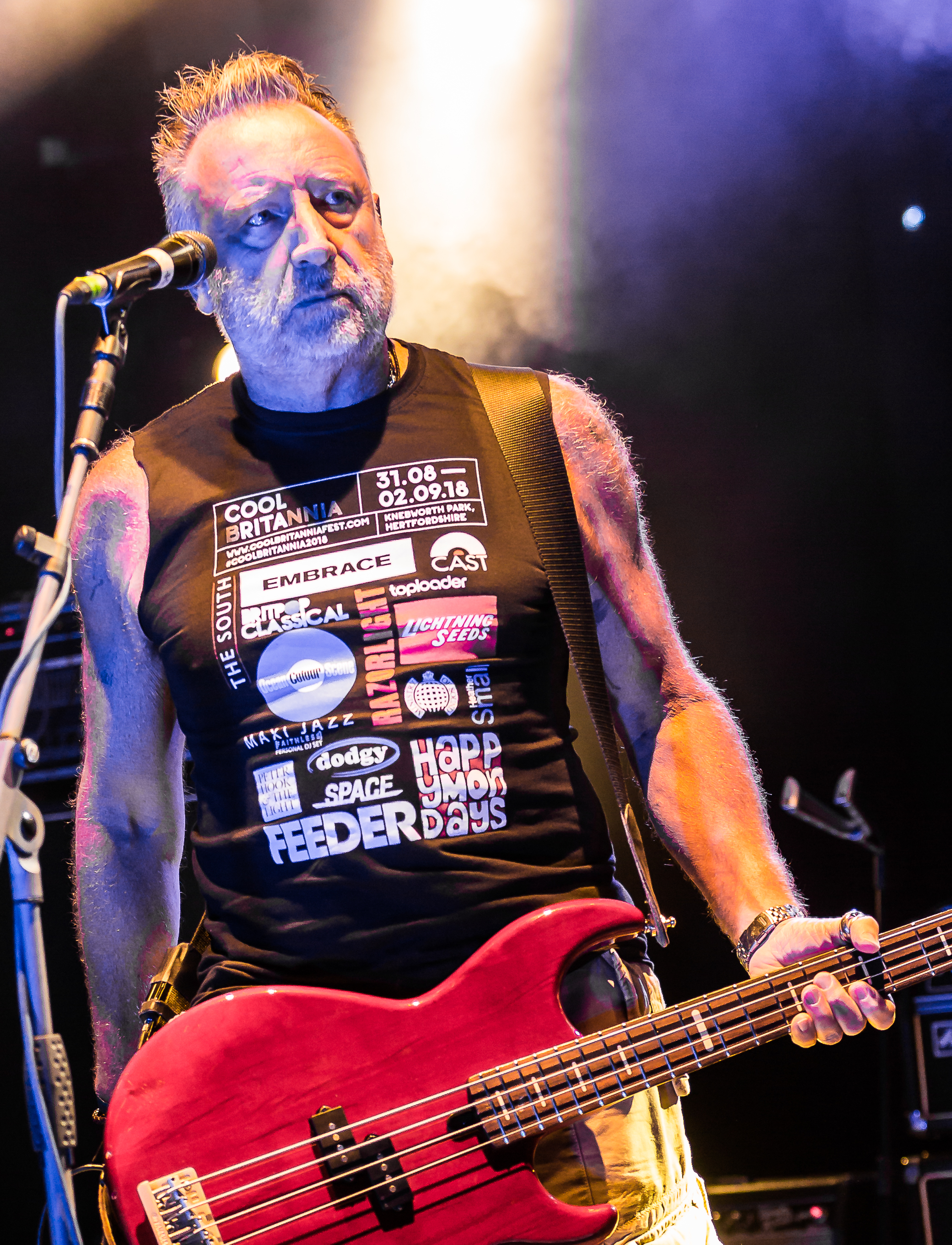
- Hook performing in 2018

Background information
- Born: Peter Woodhead; 13 February 1956 (age 70); Broughton, Salford, Lancashire, England
- Genres: Post-punk; new wave; alternative rock; alternative dance; synth-pop; electronica
- Occupation: Musician
- Instruments: Bass guitar; vocals; percussion; synthesizer
- Years active: 1976–present
- Member of: Peter Hook & the Light
- Formerly of: Joy Division; New Order; Ad Infinitum; Revenge; Monaco; Freebass
- Spouse: Caroline Aherne (m. 1994; div. 1997)
- Peter Hook's voice from the BBC programme Great Lives, 6 May 2008.

Peter Hook (né Woodhead; born 13 February 1956) is an English musician. He is the former bassist and co-founder of the post-punk band Joy Division and its successor New Order. He often used the bass as a lead instrument, playing melodies on the high strings with a signature heavy chorus effect.

Along with Bernard Sumner, Hook formed the band which was to become Joy Division in 1976. Following the death of lead singer Ian Curtis in 1980, the band reformed as New Order; Hook played bass with the band until 2007. In 2026, Hook was inducted into the Rock and Roll Hall of Fame as a member of Joy Division/New Order after two previous nominations.

Hook has recorded one album with Revenge (One True Passion), two albums with Monaco (Music for Pleasure and Monaco) and one album with Freebass (It's a Beautiful Life), serving as bassist, keyboardist and lead vocalist. He is currently the lead singer and one of the bassists for Peter Hook & the Light.

== Biography ==
=== Early life ===
Hook was born Peter Woodhead on 13 February 1956, in Broughton, Salford, Lancashire, to Irene (née Acton), and John Woodhead. His parents divorced in 1959 when he was three years old. He and his brother Christopher were brought up by his maternal grandmother Alicia Acton (née Chapman) until 1962, when his mother remarried Ernest William Hook. Like his bandmate Bernard Sumner, he took his stepfather's surname, although in contrast to his friend he kept it, even creating his nickname, "Hooky", from it. Because of his stepfather's work, he spent part of his childhood in Jamaica before returning to Salford, where he attended Salford Grammar School.

=== Joy Division (1976–1980) ===
On 4 June and 20 July 1976, childhood friends Bernard Sumner and Hook attended a Sex Pistols show at the Manchester Lesser Free Trade Hall. Hook borrowed £35 from his mother to buy his first bass guitar. Inspired by what they had seen, Sumner and Hook formed a band with their friend Terry Mason, who had also attended the shows.

Their band, originally called Warsaw, debuted on 29 May 1977 at the Electric Circus, supporting Buzzcocks, Penetration and John Cooper Clarke. The band played their first gig as Joy Division on 25 January 1978 at Pip's Disco in Manchester.

=== New Order (1980–1993) ===
In 1980, after Joy Division, the remaining members formed New Order. The band continued until they first broke up in 1993.

In 1984, Hook recorded the single "Telstar" with the short-lived band Ad Infinitum. In the late 1980s, Hook also worked as a producer for bands such as Inspiral Carpets and the Stone Roses.

=== After New Order disbanding (1993–98) ===
In 1995, he toured with the Durutti Column. He has recorded one album with the band Revenge and two with Monaco (both as bassist, keyboardist and lead vocalist) with David Potts, the latter of which scored a club and alternative radio hit "What Do You Want From Me?" in 1997.

=== New Order reformation (1998–2007) ===
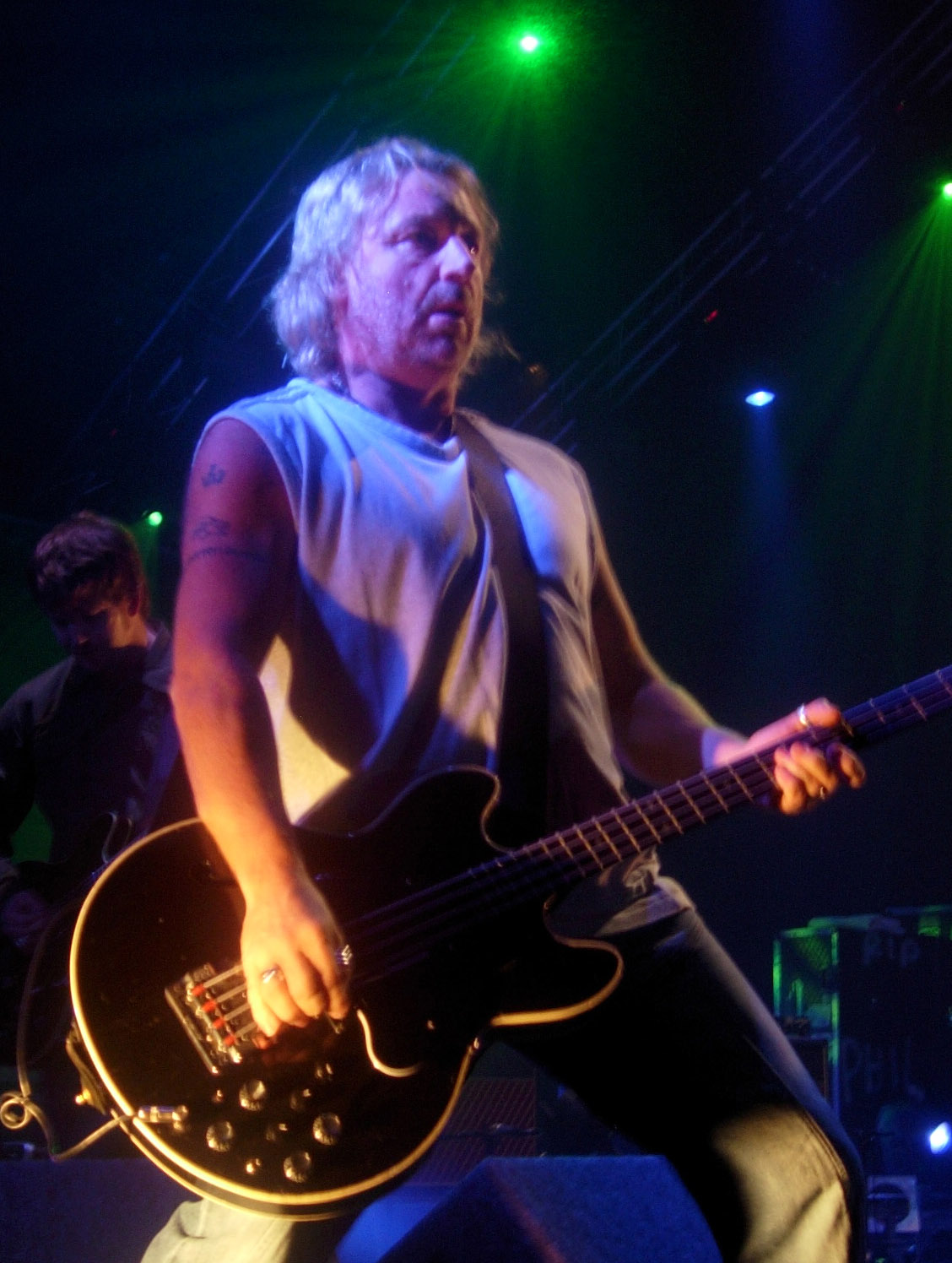
Hook playing with New Order in 2005

New Order reformed in 1998.

Hook contributed to Perry Farrell's Satellite Party. His bass can be heard on "Wish Upon a Dogstar" and "Kinky". Inspired by Clint Boon of Inspiral Carpets, he started with the Return to New York nights in London.

He contributed a distinctive bassline to Hybrid's 2003 single "True to Form", as well as another track from their Morning Sci-Fi album, "Higher Than a Skyscraper", playing on stage with them on a number of dates of their ensuing tour.

Hook also co-owned the Suite Sixteen recording studio, formerly Cargo Studios, which Hook purchased with Chris Hewitt in 1984. Cargo and Suite Sixteen in Kenion Street, Rochdale, were major studios in the history of punk and post-punk music. A blue plaque was unveiled on the Kenion Street music building in Rochdale that used to house the studios in September 2009 and Peter Hook played a special concert in Rochdale on that day with Section 25 donating all proceeds to the Back Door Music Project, a Rochdale youth project for people interested in music.

In the mid 2000s, Hook was regularly performing as a DJ, however he was discovered to be playing pre-mixed CDs and only miming the actions of a DJ. He admitted he was only pretending to be a DJ on his Myspace blog, but then removed it due to public backlash.

=== Post New Order (2007–2010) ===
On 4 May 2007, Hook announced on Xfm that he and New Order singer/guitarist Bernard Sumner were no longer working together, effectively spelling the end for the band; the band later denied disbanding. He then played and recorded a studio album, It's a Beautiful Life (2010), with a new band project called Freebass with bass players Mani (the Stone Roses) and Andy Rourke (ex-the Smiths).

Hook and Potts reformed Monaco on two occasions in 2007, with original drummer Paul Kehoe and Hook's son Jack completing the line up for two gigs at Manchester's Hard Rock Cafe in March and at the Ritz Theatre in October. He is featured on "Dirty Thirty" and "Blunts & Robots", two tracks off of the Crystal Method's 2009 album Divided by Night. Hook compiled "The Hacienda Acid House Classics" in 2009 following on from his original mix of "The Hacienda Classics" from 2006. In October 2009, Hook published his book on his time as co-owner of the Hacienda, How Not to Run a Club.

=== Peter Hook & the Light (2010–present) ===
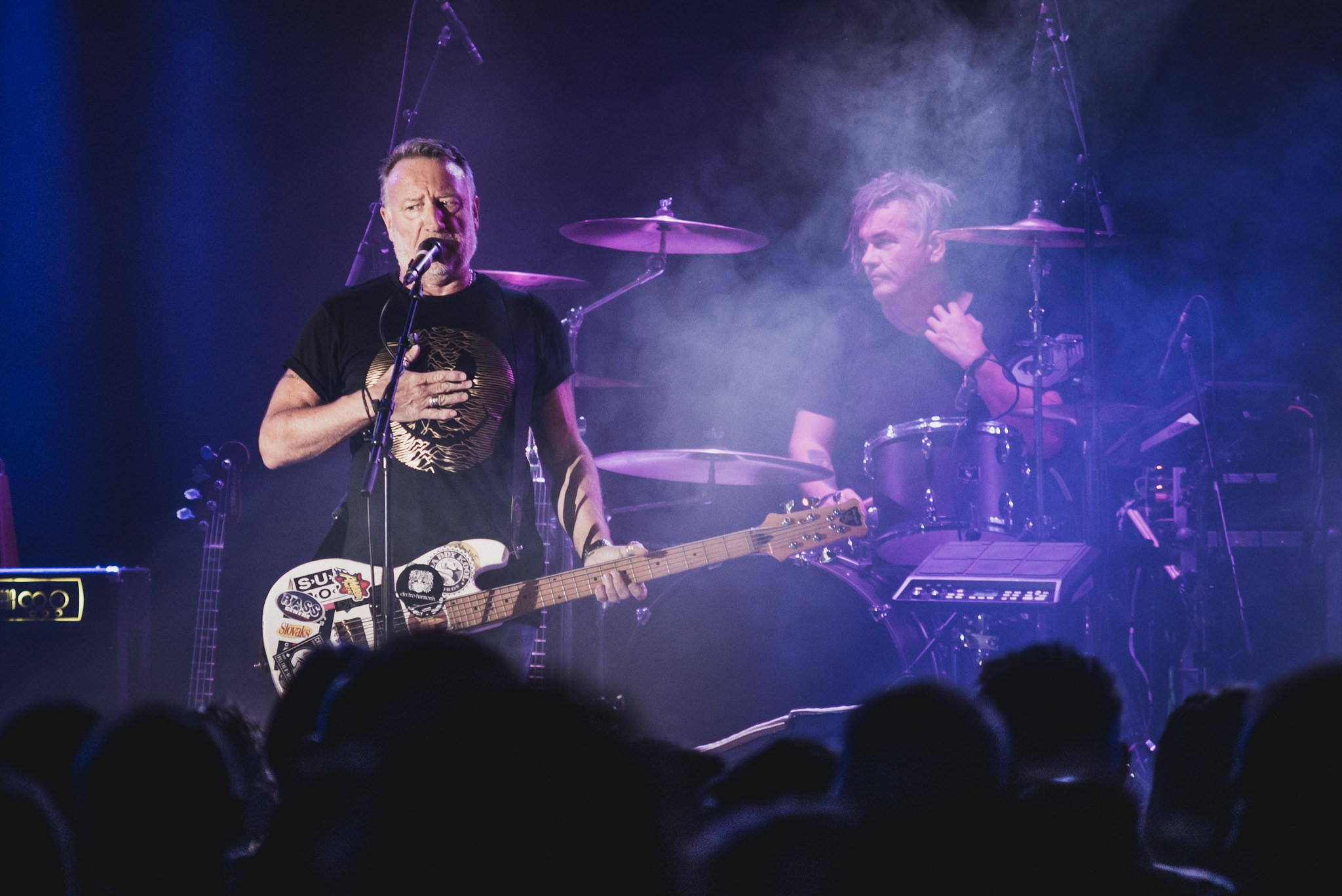
Peter Hook & the Light in 2018

Hook then opened a new club and live venue in Manchester, FAC 251 – The Factory, in February 2010 singing lead vocals with his band, Peter Hook & the Light. The club is situated in the old head offices of Factory Records in Manchester city centre. On 18 May 2010, the 30th anniversary of Ian Curtis' death, the Light performed a set of Joy Division songs including every track from Unknown Pleasures. In 2010, Hook also recorded and released two EPs on American indie record label 24 Hour Service Station as Man Ray with production partner and Freebass keyboardist Phil Murphy. The first, released in April and entitled Summer '88, revisited the staple sounds of the Hacienda nightclub, with the duo using a mixture of classic Roland synths and drum machines to simulate early acid house vibes. Tokyo Joe followed in December, blending Hook's trademark high range bass sound and old school punk inflected vocal chant with Murphy's classic synths, guitars and drum machines to produce an indie dance track reminiscent of classic New Order. The song was also used as the theme to FAC 251 – The Factory.

In 2010, six 'Peter Hook Hacienda Bass' guitars were to be built using the maple dancefloor sections from the Hacienda as the fretboard on the neck of the guitar. In 2011, Peter Hook & the Light released 1102 2011 EP which includes four versions of Joy Division songs, including the previously unrecorded "Pictures in My Mind". The EP took its name from the palindromic recording date of 11 February 2011 at Blueprint Studio, Salford. It featured Happy Mondays vocalist Rowetta who sings versions of "Atmosphere", "New Dawn Fades" and "Insight". Hook sings "Pictures in My Mind", an unfinished Joy Division track discovered on a demo recording unearthed by the band's "bootleg society" from a rehearsal tape stolen in 1977, setting it between Warsaw and Unknown Pleasures. The effervescent and punk-tinged tune was completed for this release, and was declared "a worthy addition to the Joy Division canon" by BBC 6Music DJ Mark Radcliffe.

In 2012, Hook launched a brand new master's degree programme in Music Industry Management and Promotion at the University of Central Lancashire. It provides an opportunity to study the music business at postgraduate level and to get hands-on experience of working within the industry. Students will combine their academic studies with a placement in a commercial music industry institution working on real world projects. The course offers industrial experience which will involve working in the Factory 251 venue in Manchester, providing contact with significant industry figures connected with this culturally important company. Hook was awarded an honorary fellowship from the same institution on 11 July 2012.

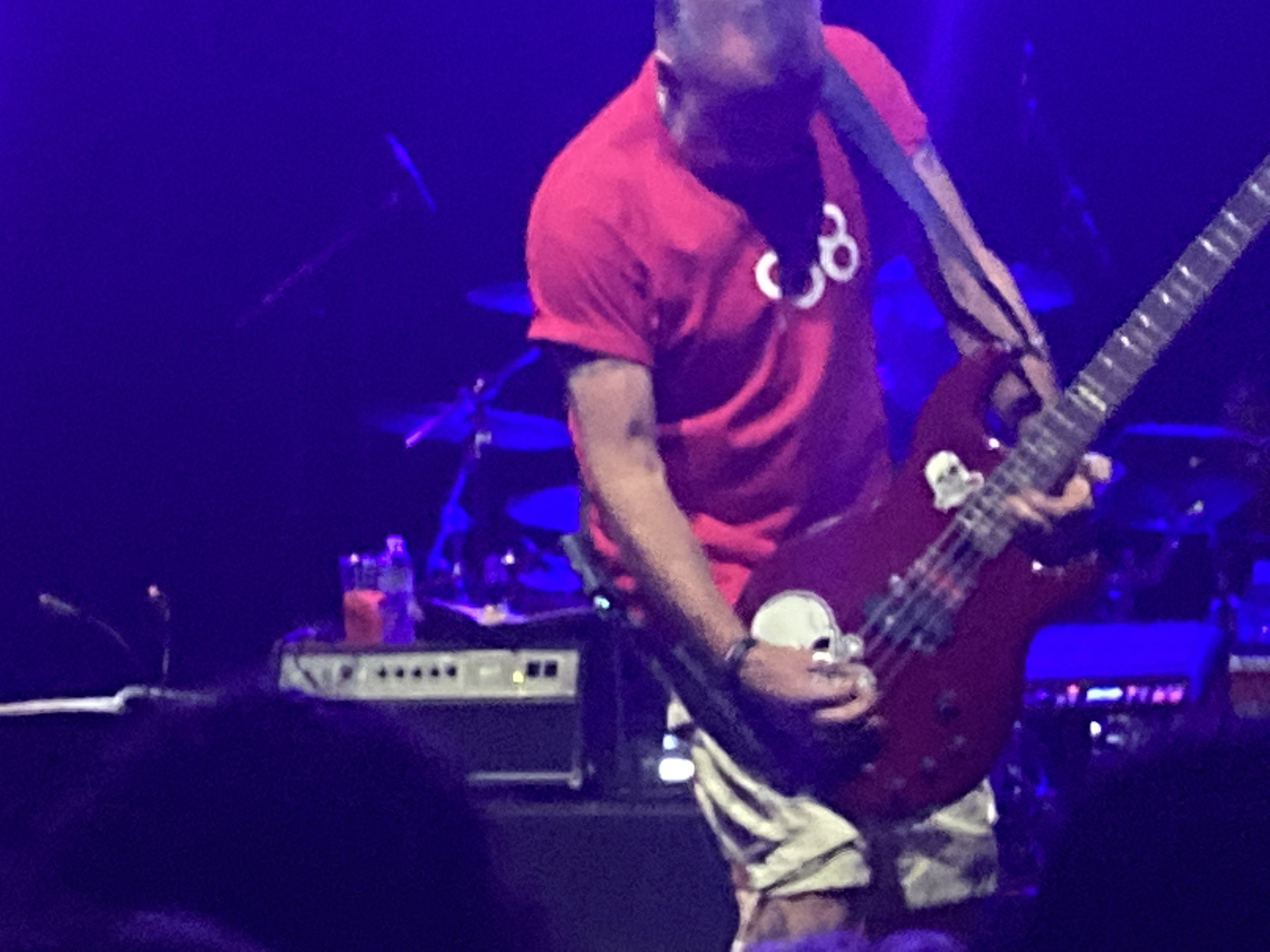
Peter Hook performing at Terminal 5, New York, 27 August 2022

On 29 January 2013, Hook published Unknown Pleasures: Inside Joy Division; an autobiographical account of his time in the band. In November 2015, The Guardian reported that Hook was suing his former bandmates for continuing to use the name New Order. The parties settled out of court.

On 6 October 2016, he released the book Substance: Inside New Order. On 9 April 2020, he collaborated with the virtual band Gorillaz's musical project Song Machine, featuring on the song "Aries" alongside English musician Georgia.

== Personal life ==
Hook has two children from his first marriage with Iris Bates, including his son Jack who has been the touring bassist for The Smashing Pumpkins since 2015.

In 1994, he married comedian Caroline Aherne but the marriage ended in 1997. After Aherne's 2016 death, Hook said their marriage had been turbulent, violent and abusive and she once attempted to stab him with a kitchen knife. He subsequently married Rebecca Jones and has a daughter with her.

In July 2012, Hook was awarded an Honorary Fellowship, from the University of Central Lancashire, during the graduation of the university's creative arts students.

== Playing style ==
Hook has said that he developed his habit of playing higher-pitched bass lines when he started performing with Joy Division because his first amplifier (bought from his former art teacher for £10) was low quality and only the higher notes were audible against Bernard Sumner's loud guitar. Michael Sutton of Allmusic writes of Joy Division: "many of the group's songs were driven by Hook's sinister, throbbing bass." Hook contributed backing vocals on numerous Joy Division songs in concert and sang co-lead with Ian Curtis on Joy Division's "Interzone".

With New Order's increasing use of sequenced synthesised bass, especially throughout most of 1989's Technique and 1993's Republic, Hook's bass playing became ever more melodic and rhythmic, often exploiting the higher notes on his bass guitars. He sang lead on two New Order songs ("Dreams Never End" and "Doubts Even Here" from the 1981 debut album Movement).

== Equipment ==
=== Bass guitars ===
- Gibson EB-0 copy – Hook's first bass guitar, bought at Mazel's Music Shop in Manchester in 1976 and used live with Warsaw 1977 (there are photos of him playing it at a 1977 gig at Rafters, Manchester) and on 18 July 1977 Warsaw demos. He still owns it.
- Gibson EB-1 – He used it after retiring the EB-0 copy, but sold it years later because he had no money after building a custom bass guitar.
- Hondo Rickenbacker 4001 bass copy – Used on Joy Division's 1978–1980 recordings and used live with Joy Division 1978–1980.
- Shergold Marathon six string bass – Used with later Joy Division and New Order
- Eccleshall 335 Style Hollowbody 4 string bass – Used with New Order since early 1980s. This twin pick-up 34" Scale Length bass guitar has a hollow body similar to the Gibson EB-2. The neck is glued to the body like a Gibson and built with maple tops and an ebony fret board. The electronics are identical to his Yamaha BB1200S with active and passive pick-ups. His Eccleshall has standard twin tone and volume knobs each controlling the neck or bridge pick-up, in addition with treble, mid and bass controls. Switches to start the active pick-ups are located between the tone and volume knobs. A 9 volt battery powers the active circuits. The headstock is labelled "HOT 1" or "Hot 2" depending on which model he uses. The name "Eccleshall" has been labelled behind the headstock.
- Yamaha bass guitars BB1200S and BB734. He currently tours with the newer BB734 model. In 2020, Yamaha released the Peter Hook Signature Bass which features details from his BB1200S and BB734.

=== Amplification and effects ===
The main equipment Hook used during the early days of New Order was an Alembic F-2B preamp/Roland rack unit/Amcron DC-300A power amp fed through two large custom built 2 × 15 Gauss loaded flightcase cabinets designed and built by Chris Hewitt of Tractor Music. These can be seen in the "Love Will Tear Us Apart" music video, as can Hook's Yamaha BB1200. The Alembic–Amcron–Gauss system was designed by Hook, Chris Hewitt and Martin Hannett. In the earlier days of Joy Division, Hook used a Sound City L120 head and then a Hiwatt Custom 100 Watt head. The Sound City and Hiwatt heads were both used with a Vox Foundation 1 × 18 cabinet bought from Hook's former art teacher. The Hiwatt was then used on top of a 4 × 15 Gauss loaded Marshall cabinet put together by Tractor. The Marshall 4 × 15 Gauss cabinet was stolen during New Order's first visit to America. He has also used an Ampeg SVT rig, and has expressed interest in Ashdown amplification.

For the most part, his distinctive tone comes from the use of a chorus pedal, an Electro-Harmonix Clone Theory. In New Order from 1990 onwards Hook used Hiwatt 200 watt heads mounted on Hiwatt 1 × 15 and 4 × 10 combined speaker cabinets with Fane speakers. With Revenge and Monaco, he updated an Ampeg SVT, which is used at maximum volume when playing live. He is currently using an Ampeg SVT-CL with an Ampeg cabinet.

== Film portrayals ==
In Michael Winterbottom's 2002 film 24 Hour Party People, which focused on Factory Records, Hook was played by Ralf Little. In Anton Corbijn's 2007 film Control, which focused on the life of Ian Curtis, he was played by Joe Anderson.

== Discography ==
=== Joy Division ===
- Unknown Pleasures (1979)
- Closer (1980)

=== New Order ===
- Movement (1981)
- Power, Corruption & Lies (1983)
- Low-Life (1985)
- Brotherhood (1986)
- Technique (1989)
- Republic (1993)
- Get Ready (2001)
- Waiting for the Sirens' Call (2005)

=== Revenge ===
- One True Passion (1990)
- One True Passion V2.0 (2004)
- No Pain No Gain (2005)

=== Monaco ===
- Music for Pleasure (1997)
- Monaco (2000)

=== Freebass ===
- It's a Beautiful Life (2010)

== Bibliography ==
- Hook, Peter (2010). The Hacienda: How Not to Run a Club. UK: Simon & Schuster. 368pp. ISBN 978-1-84739-177-3.
- Hook, Peter (2012). Unknown Pleasures: Inside Joy Division. UK: Simon & Schuster. 336pp. ISBN 978-0-85720-215-4.
- Hook, Peter (2016). Substance: Inside New Order. UK: Simon & Schuster. 768pp. ISBN 978-1-4711-3240-7.
