= Starsailor discography =

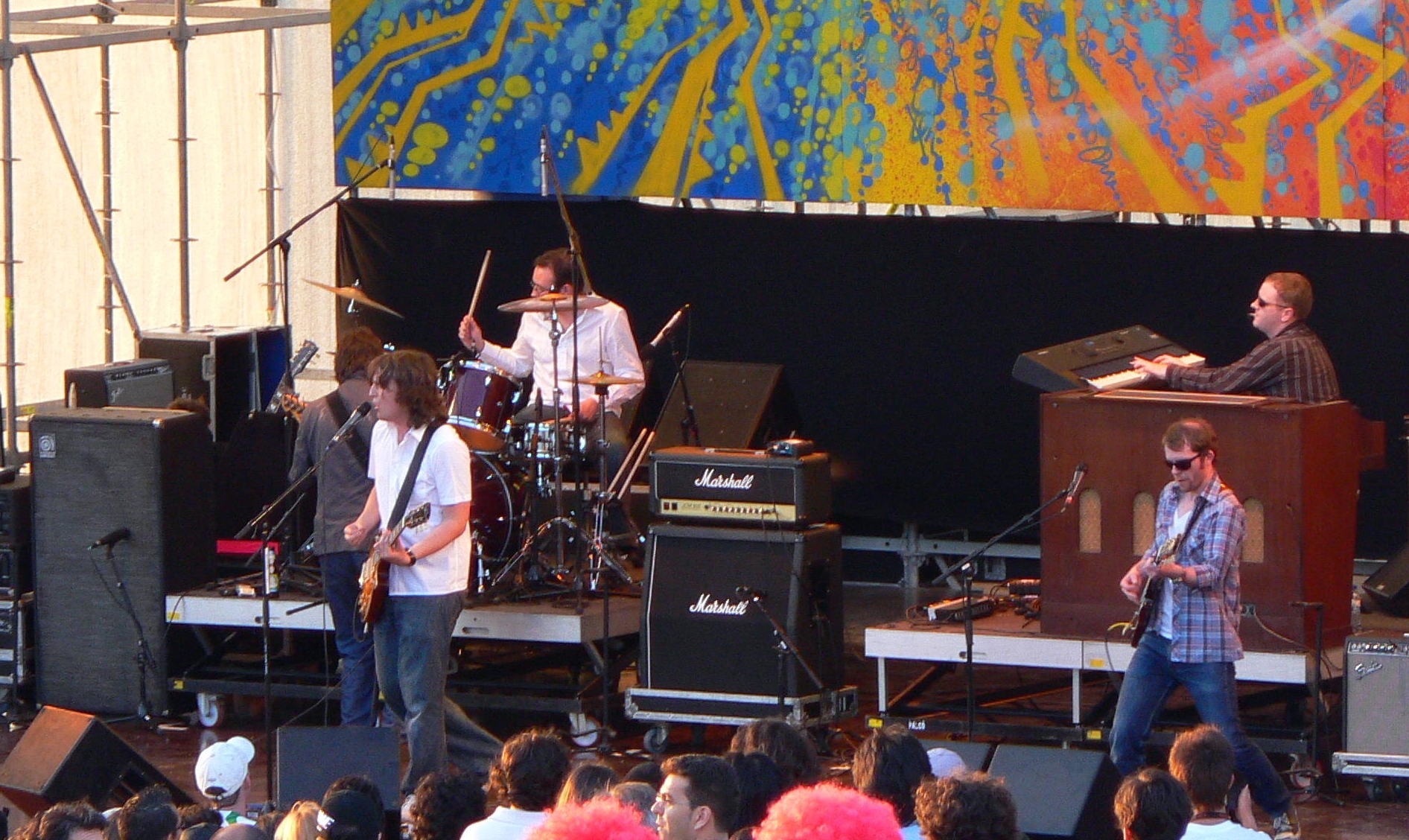
- Starsailor performing at Rock in Rio in 2006.
- Studio albums: 6
- Extended plays: 1
- Live albums: 1
- Compilation albums: 1
- Singles: 13
- B-sides: 15

This is a discography for British rock band Starsailor, all releases are on the EMI label in the UK and EMI/Artist Addiction in the US. Since 2008 they worked in the UK under Virgin Records, a sub-label of EMI Records:

== Albums ==
=== Studio albums ===
List of studio albums, with selected details, chart positions and certifications
Title	Album details	Peak chart positions										Certifications (sales thresholds)
Title	Album details	UK	AUT	BEL	FRA	GER	IRE	ITA	NLD	SWI	US	Certifications (sales thresholds)
Love Is Here	Released: 8 October 2001; Label: EMI; Formats: CD, digital download, LP	2	25	42	78	26	4	20	68	72	129	BPI: Platinum
Silence Is Easy	Released: 15 September 2003; Label: EMI; Formats: CD, digital download	2	8	17	47	20	25	13	31	24	—	BPI: Gold
On the Outside	Released: 17 October 2005; Label: EMI; Formats: CD, digital download	13	33	24	111	93	—	59	56	25	—	BPI: Silver
All the Plans	Released: 9 March 2009; Label: EMI; Formats: CD, digital download	26	60	12	140	—	—	—	90	31	—	
All This Life	Released: 1 September 2017; Label: Cooking Vinyl; Formats: CD, digital download	23	—	73	—	—	—	—	196	58	—	
Where the Wild Things Grow	Released: 22 March 2024; Label: Townsend; Formats: CD, digital download	25	—	—	—	—	—	—	—	—	—	

=== Live albums ===
List of live albums, with selected details and chart positions
Title	Album details	Peak chart positions
Title	Album details	UK
Starsailor with Strings: Live from Liverpool	Released: 3 October 2025; Label: Parlophone; Formats: CD, LP, digital download	50

=== Compilation albums ===
Compilation album, with selected details and chart position
Title	Album details	Peak chart positions
Title	Album details	BEL
Good Souls: The Greatest Hits	Released: 18 September 2015; Label: Parlophone; Formats: CD, digital download	85

== EPs ==
EP, with year of release
Title	Year
Boy in Waiting	2008

== Singles ==
List of singles, with selected chart positions and certifications
Title	Year	Peak chart positions										Certifications	Album
Title	Year	UK	AUS	BEL	FRA	GER	IRE	ITA	NLD	SWI	US Alt	Certifications	Album
"Fever"	2001	18	—	—	—	—	—	—	—	—	—		Love Is Here
"Good Souls"	2001	12	—	—	—	—	43	—	82	—	28		Love Is Here
"Alcoholic"	2001	10	—	—	—	—	42	—	89	—	—		Love Is Here
"Lullaby"	2001	36	—	—	—	—	—	—	—	—	—		Love Is Here
"Poor Misguided Fool"	2002	23	—	—	—	—	—	—	—	—	—		Love Is Here
"Silence Is Easy"	2003	9	—	—	—	—	40	—	70	—	—		Silence Is Easy
"Born Again"	2003	40	—	—	—	—	—	—	—	—	—		Silence Is Easy
"Four to the Floor"	2004	24	5	1	1	82	—	22	—	14	—	ARIA: Platinum; SNEP: Gold	Silence Is Easy
"In the Crossfire"	2005	22	—	—	—	—	—	46	91	—	—		On the Outside
"This Time"	2006	24	—	—	—	—	47	—	—	—	—		On the Outside
"Keep Us Together"	2006	47	—	—	—	—	—	—	—	—	—		On the Outside
"Tell Me It's Not Over"	2009	73	—	5	—	—	—	—	—	—	—		All the Plans
"All the Plans"	2009	—	—	59	—	—	—	—	—	—	—		All the Plans
"Give Up the Ghost"	2015	—	—	—	—	—	—	—	—	—	—		Good Souls: The Greatest Hits
"Listen to Your Heart"	2017	—	—	—	—	—	—	—	—	—	—		All This Life
"All This Life"	2017	—	—	—	—	—	—	—	—	—	—		All This Life
"Take a Little Time"	2017	—	—	—	—	—	—	—	—	—	—		All This Life

== In other media ==
- The song "Four to the Floor" was remixed and included on the soundtrack to the film Layer Cake.
- "Keep Us Together" has been used frequently by Match of the Day.
- Before they were released as singles, Sky Sports used instrumental versions of "Four to the Floor" and "Keep Us Together" as background music for various televised International Cricket tours.
- The BBC also used an instrumental version as the background music for the Commonwealth Games 2006 interactive service.
- The song "I Don't Know" from their On the Outside album was featured in the second season of Veronica Mars.
- The song "Some of Us" from their Silence Is Easy album was featured in the fifth episode of Bones, in the Belgian film The Alzheimer Case and the PBS documentary "Carrier".
- The song "Way to Fall" from their Love is Here album was featured in the ending credits of video game Metal Gear Solid 3: Snake Eater. It was also used in the trailer of the Dutch film Love Life with Carice van Houten.
- A music video of "Bring My Love" is featured on DVD 2 of the 2 DVD set of Oldboy, released in Germany and Austria. The video consists entirely of clips from the film.
- The song "Faith Hope Love" from their On the Outside album was featured in Season 2, Episode 5 – Aftermath of Criminal Minds and Season 3, Episode 12 of One Tree Hill.
- The song "Tie Up My Hands" was featured on the television show Trigger Happy TV.
- The song "Rise Up" was used on the finale of US TV show Eli Stone.
- The song "Shark Food" was used in the German soap opera "Anna und die Liebe" (episode 155).
- The song "Tell Me It's Not Over" was used by BBC One as the background to its two-minute show-reel of new drama for Autumn 2009
- The song "Good Souls" was used in a poignant moment in the documentary Mayor of the Sunset Strip in which the subject, L.A. disc jockey and scenester Rodney Bingenheimer, takes his mother's ashes to London to be scattered at sea.
- The song "Tie Up My Hands" was featured in the trailers for the films 25th Hour and Greta, although the song does not appear in the films themselves.
- The song "Silence is Easy" was used in Season 1, Episode 3 of One Tree Hill
- The song "Faith Hope Love" was used in Season 3, Episode 12 of One Tree Hill
- The song "Neon Sky" was used in Season 6, Episode 13 of One Tree Hill
- The song "Safe at Home" was used in Season 6, Episode 24 of One Tree Hill
- The song "Four to the Floor" is used as a jingle on Guerilla Cricket when a boundary is scored.
- The song "You Never Get What you Deserve" was used in Season 2 Episode 18 of Greek soap opera Ta Mistika tis Edem.

== Other contributions ==
- Live at the World Café: Vol. 15 - Handcrafted (2002, World Café) – "Good Souls"
- Serve3 (2008, World Café) – "Military Madness" (Cover version of Graham Nash song)
