= Good Souls: The Greatest Hits =

Greatest hits album by Starsailor
- Released: 18 September 2015
- Recorded: 2001–2015
- Genre: Indie rock, alternative rock
- Length: 77:34
- Label: Parlophone
- Producer: Mark Aubrey; Steve Osborne; Harry Rutherford; Rob Schnapf; Phil Spector; Danton Supple

Starsailor chronology
All the Plans (2009)	Good Souls: The Greatest Hits (2015)	All This Life (2017)

Singles from Good Souls: The Greatest Hits
- 1. "Give Up the Ghost" Released: 11 September 2015

Good Souls: The Greatest Hits is the first greatest hits album by UK indie rock band Starsailor, released on 18 September 2015. The album contains hits from between Love Is Here (2001) and All the Plans (2009) and two new tracks: "Give Up the Ghost" and "Hold On".

== Release ==
The album was released on 18 September 2015 and was accompanied by a UK tour.

== Track listing ==
Standard edition
No.	Title	From album	Length
1.	"Good Souls"	Love Is Here	4:59
2.	"Silence Is Easy"	Silence Is Easy	3:39
3.	"Alcoholic" (single version)	Love Is Here	2:54
4.	"Give Up the Ghost"	New song	3:17
5.	"In the Crossfire"	On the Outside	3:18
6.	"Poor Misguided Fool"	Love Is Here	3:49
7.	"Four to the Floor" (radio edit)	Silence Is Easy	4:11
8.	"This Time" (radio edit)	On the Outside	3:30
9.	"Fever" (radio edit)	Love Is Here	4:00
10.	"Born Again" (radio edit)	Silence Is Easy	4:43
11.	"Lullaby"	Love Is Here	4:10
12.	"Keep Us Together" (radio edit)	On the Outside	3:45
13.	"Way to Fall"	Love Is Here	4:28
14.	"All the Plans" (radio edit)	All the Plans	3:00
15.	"Hold On"	New song	3:33
16.	"Tell Me It's Not Over"	All the Plans	3:23
17.	"Tie Up My Hands"	Love Is Here	5:45
18.	"Fidelity"	Silence Is Easy	2:22

Bonus track
No.	Title	From album	Length
19.	"Four to the Floor" (Thin White Duke mix)	"Four to the Floor" single	8:10

== Personnel ==
- James Walsh – lead vocals, guitar
- Ben Byrne – drums
- James Stelfox – bass
- Barry Westhead – keyboards

== Charts ==
Chart (2015)	Peak position
Belgian Albums (Ultratop Flanders)	85
Belgian Albums (Ultratop Wallonia)	172
UK Albums (OCC)	157
