= Lullaby (James Walsh album) =

Studio album by James Walsh
- Released: September 17, 2012
- Genre: Alternative rock
- Length: 52:31
- Label: Smith and Songs
- Producer: Sacha Skarbek

James Walsh chronology
All the Plans (2009)	Lullaby (2012)

Singles from Lullaby
- 1. "Start Again" Released: July 30, 2012

Lullaby is the first solo album from James Walsh, the former lead singer of Starsailor. It was released on September 17, 2012 via iTunes in the UK.

== Background ==
After Starsailor decided to take a hiatus, James teamed up with songwriter Sacha Skarbek to initially work on material for his debut solo album. During these sessions, Sacha introduced James to Philippa Smith, who was in the process of developing a film along with acclaimed Swedish director Ulf Johansson based on Lullaby (novel) by acclaimed US author Chuck Palahnuik. After they quickly put together a demo for the song "Road Kill Jesus", James and Sacha were approached to create an album of music inspired by the script and original source material.

James and Sacha were then provided with song titles, music briefs and images by the production company and work on the album commenced at Abbey Road studios. Sacha covered the walls of the studio with images sent by Ulf Johansson designed to inspire the mood of the film.

== Album style and direction ==
According to Entertainment Focus, the album contains:

"A beautiful collection of songs, recorded at Abbey Road studios, that showcase Walsh’s newfound maturity of sound which is at once both sophisticated and raw; perfectly complementing [James's] powerful voice and engaging the captivating themes of the [Lullaby] project."

== Singles ==
The lead single "Start Again" featured an accompanying music video, which was directed by Ulf Johansson and features James playing the part of "Oyster" and actress Natalie Press as "Mona" - characters taken from the script and original Lullaby (novel) book. The song was released as a digital download on July 30, 2012.

== Track listing ==
All tracks are written by James Walsh and Sacha Skarbek.

No.	Title	Length
1.	"Road Kill Jesus"	2:37
2.	"Lullaby Song"	5:09
3.	"Helen's Song"	4:17
4.	"Start Again"	3:29
5.	"Counting Song"	4:25
6.	"Culling Song"	3:23
7.	"Angel Of Death"	3:46
8.	"Noise-A-Phobe"	3:53
9.	"I Told You Once"	4:35
10.	"Paper Roses"	3:30
11.	"Making You Love Me (Love Spell)"	4:00
12.	"This Town"	3:51
13.	"Sticks And Stones"	3:40
14.	"White Noise"	4:36
