= All the Plans =

Studio album by Starsailor
- Released: 9 March 2009
- Recorded: 2007–2008
- Genres: Alternative rock, post-Britpop
- Length: 41:59
- Labels: Virgin, EMI
- Producer: Steve Osborne

Starsailor chronology
Boy in Waiting (2008)	All the Plans (2009)	Good Souls: The Greatest Hits (2015)

Singles from All the Plans
- 1. "Tell Me It's Not Over" Released: 2 March 2009; 2. "All the Plans" Released: 22 June 2009

All the Plans is Starsailor's fourth studio album. It was announced on 16 October 2008 and was released on 9 March 2009. The album was released via iTunes in the US on 28 April 2009.

Initially named All the Plans or Boy in Waiting, the album title was revealed on 16 October 2008. This release is Starsailor's first album with Virgin Records. Starsailor worked with Steve Osborne, who previously worked with the band on their debut album Love Is Here, and with engineer Dan Austin, who was also working with Doves on their fourth studio album Kingdom of Rust at the same time. Most of the information about the release of the album has been taken from the messages written by James Walsh on the band's MySpace page.

== Background ==
The band recorded the album in Henley-on-Thames, and Richard Warren worked with the band in the studio. It was announced in February 2008 by James Walsh that the album was finished and that the band was mixing the album in a studio in Acton called "Sofa Sound." They were simultaneously "putting the finishing touches to a busy summer schedule."

== Album style and direction ==
According to the band's MySpace messages, the new album would be a mixture between their heavier side and the romantic side shown in their previous albums. James said in an interview with the digital newspaper Scotsman.com: "I'm sure a lot of fans will be excited by the following: It's closer in spirit to the first album – it's got real soul to it. We've gone more for the emotional, tugging at the heartstrings approach. We went off on a bit of a rock tangent on the last album. It was good fun but it's time to get back to our roots."

On 21 March 2008, James Walsh wrote:

There has been an emphasis on strong melodies and simple arrangements for this album and the guitar playing of Richard Warren has definitely enhanced the sound. I'm not one for slagging off the last album and saying this one is 100 times better because the last album definitely had its merits. However we have spent a lot longer writing and recording this one and the result is the perfect companion to Love Is Here.

According to Manchester Evening News, there isn't a particular theme to All the Plans but "married life and international politics are some of the key ingredients." Walsh said, "We've tried to write classic songs."

In an interview with James Oldham, Walsh commented that he thought the band had perhaps become a bit too defensive to media impressions:

We wanted to prove people wrong. Working with Phil Spector on the second record [he actually only produced two tracks before he was fired] and then making a more American sounding rock record [2005's On the Outside] was just our way of trying to prove ourselves to our detractors. The new album is us realising that that was unnecessary and returning to the sound that we love and established us in the first place."

The album was postponed one week in order not to clash with U2's then-forthcoming album, No Line on the Horizon. According to Walsh, when the band was recording a live session on Radio 2 on 13 January 2009, radio hosts Mark Radcliffe and Stuart Maconie highlighted the fact that Starsailor would release All the Plans on the same day as U2 and else suggest calling Bono and "toss a coin for who moves their release date." Bono called "heads", winning the toss, and so All the Plans was postponed for a week.

== Reception ==
Professional ratings
Review scores
Source	Rating
Drowned in Sound	3/10 stars
Entertainment.ie	2/5 stars
The Guardian	4/5 stars
PopMatters	7/10 stars
The Skinny	2/5 stars
The Times Online	3/5 stars

Initial critical response to All the Plans was generally favourable. According to Metacritic, which assigns a normalised rating out of 100 to reviews from mainstream critics, the album has received an average score of 62, based on 9 reviews.

On 5 February 2009, the newspaper Washington Square News posted the world's first review of All the Plans, giving a generally positive assessment. Kadeen Griffiths from Washington Square News wrote that: "The band's fourth studio album is both its first with Virgin Records and with Rolling Stones guitarist Ronnie Wood. The result is a cohesive blend of solid beats and fantastic harmonies. The addition of subtle, simple sounds like the tambourine on "Boy in Waiting" and the piano intro to "Change My Mind" gives the album a homey, personal feel. Tambourine and piano may not be the most innovative, but they provide a glimpse into the heart and soul of the band through their simple sounds."

On 13 February 2009, Nigel Goulds from Belfast Telegraph stated, "The band have served up another collection of heart-tugging tracks which again benefit from James Walsh's – who's based in Belfast much of the time – unique set of vocal cords. There's really nothing new to add to the Starsailor repertoire but when they produce songs of uncluttered grandeur they really are in a league of their own."

On 26 February 2009, The Guardian gave the album its first rave review, praising the quality of the songs, the emotional core, and Ron Wood's guitar work, summarising "With no one expecting it but themselves Starsailor have delivered." PopMatters called the lyrics "a rather pedestrian litany of breakup woes" but concurred that the melodies were well written and asserted that they, and most especially Walsh's vocals, more than made up for such flaws. They concluded "Starsailor are the most consistently good of the English pop troupes, with each of their efforts succeeding gracefully at what they attempt to accomplish."

On 8 March 2009, Dan Cairns from The Times claimed that, "What has changed is that the self-consciousness and anxiety that marred 2005's On the Outside has gone. On All the Plans, Starsailor sound like a band in love again with being a band," and added that "there is a real sense here of a band finally settling into their own skin, and rather liking the feeling."

On 9 March 2009, Andrew Hirst from the Huddersfield Daily Examiner said that, "Now nine years into their topsy turvy career, Starsailor have reached a new peak with an album of stunning elegance and presence."

On 12 March 2009, The Glaswegian named All the Plans as "album of the week," stating that, "After their last misfiring album, All the Plans can be seen as something of a comeback. It's also a return to form, as, while the Chorley lads may have lost a little ground, they've not lost their way with emotional, melodic music. The title track, which boasts an appearance from Rolling Stone Ronnie Wood, could be Oasis at their most anthemic, while James Walsh's voice has rarely sounded better than it does on "Hurts Too Much." The real stars of the show are the rootsy "Stars and Stripes" and the album's penultimate track "Listen Up," which might be the best song the band ever wrote."

However, Mojo wrote a negative review, stating that, "You try to remember a single melody or hook from the record and you're found wanting", while James Skinner of Drowned in Sound went as far as to single out the lyrics to 'Change My Mind', stating that "Starsailor are so wantonly unoriginal, so brazenly mediocre on every level, it's almost like they don’t even realise that they are and totally mean all this stuff." Entertainment.ie's review echoed these sentiments, remarking "If you're looking for any more reasons to dislike Starsailor, you'll find them in abundance on album number four, which is a continuation of the dull pub-rock sound that they've rarely deviated from during their nine-year career." Gillian Watson of The Skinny was yet another voice in this chorus, asserting that "The culprit here is frontman James Walsh, whose banal lyrics and achingly sincere vocals are a wearying and occasionally embarrassing listen."

== Singles ==
The lead single "Tell Me It's Not Over" was released on 2 March 2009. The song has been played in various gigs since 2007 while they were recording their new album. "All the Plans" was officially announced by the band as the album's second single on 16 April 2009. The song was released as a digital download on 22 June 2009.

== All the Plans Tour ==
On 2 December 2008, Starsailor announced their first tour in four years to support the album. According to the official website, the All the Plans tour "is about to be sold out." On 3 June 2009, it was confirmed on their official site that the band will tour Germany, else adding that they were waiting to confirm more tour dates.

Date	City	Country	Venue
UK 2009 Tour
26 March 2009	Glasgow	Scotland	Manchester Ritz
28 March 2009	Sheffield	England	Sheffield Leadmill
30 March 2009	Liverpool	England	Liverpool Academy
31 March 2009	Leeds	England	Leeds Met Uni
1 April 2009	Wolves	England	Wolves Wulfrun
3 April 2009	Oxford	England	Oxford Academy
4 April 2009	Portsmouth	England	Portsmouth Pyramid
5 April 2009	Bristol	England	Bristol Academy
7 April 2009	Cambridge	England	Cambridge Junction
8 April 2009	Norwich	England	Norwich UEA
9 April 2009	London	England	Shepherds Bush Empire London
15 April 2009	Belfast	Northern Ireland	Spring & Airbrake
16 April 2009	Dublin	Ireland	The Academy
2 June 2009	London	England	Crisis Hidden Gig series
28 June 2009	London	England	Hard Rock Calling festival
11 July 2009	Balado	Scotland	T in the Park
12 July 2009	Kildare	Ireland	Oxegen Festival 2009
22 August 2009	Chelmsford	England	Hylands Park, V Festival
23 August 2009	Staffordshire	England	Weston Park, V Festival
24 August 2009	Edinburgh	Scotland	Edge Festival
Europe
28 May 2009	Prague	Czech Republic	Prague Hard Rock Cafe
8 June 2009	Athens	Greece	Ejekt Festival, Olympic Fencing Center of Hellinicon
21 June 2009	Istanbul	Turkey	Efes Pilsen One Love Festival
5 August 2009	Lokeren	Belgium	Lokerse Festival
9 September 2009	Zürich	Switzerland	The Kaufleuten
10 September 2009	Le Noirmont	Switzerland	Chant du Gros Festival
19 September 2009	Eindhoven	Netherlands	Effenaar
21 September 2009	Hamburg	Germany	Fabrik
22 September 2009	Berlin	Germany	Postbahnhof
23 September 2009	Munich	Germany	Theaterfabrik
24 September 2009	Milan	Italy	Magazzini Generali
27 September 2009	Köln	Germany	Gloria
28 September 2009	Amsterdam	Netherlands	Melkweg
29 September 2009	Brussels	Belgium	Ancienne Belgique
30 September 2009	Paris	France	Elysee Montmatre
North America
1 May 2009	West Hollywood, Los Angeles	United States	Troubadour Club
Asia
24 July 2009	Gyeonggi-do	South Korea	Jisan Valley Rock Festival

== Track listing ==
All tracks are written by James Walsh, James Stelfox, Ben Byrne, and Barry Westhead.

No.	Title	Length
1.	"Tell Me It's Not Over"	3:23
2.	"Boy in Waiting"	2:31
3.	"The Thames"	3:14
4.	"All the Plans"	4:11
5.	"Neon Sky"	5:19
6.	"You Never Get What You Deserve"	4:17
7.	"Hurts Too Much"	3:41
8.	"Stars and Stripes"	4:33
9.	"Change My Mind"	3:28
10.	"Listen Up"	4:19
11.	"Safe at Home"	2:57

=== Deluxe edition ===
Deluxe Edition Cover.

A deluxe edition of All the Plans was simultaneously released, featuring a bonus disc of acoustic versions (including the new track "Merry Go Round").

Bonus disc
No.	Title	Length
1.	"Listen Up" (Acoustic)	4:06
2.	"Tell Me It's Not Over" (Acoustic)	3:44
3.	"All the Plans" (Acoustic)	4:08
4.	"Merry Go Round" (Acoustic)	3:31
5.	"The Thames" (Acoustic)	3:56
6.	"Change My Mind" (Acoustic)	3:48
7.	"Stars and Stripes" (Acoustic)	4:36

== Chart positions ==
Country	Peak position
Argentine Albums Chart	10
Austria Albums Top 75	60
Belgian Albums Chart (Flanders)	12
Dutch Albums Top 100	90
France Albums Top 150	140
Swiss Albums Top 100	31
United Kingdom	26

== Personnel ==
- Vocals: James Walsh
- Guitars: James Walsh, Richard Warren, and Ronnie Wood
- Keyboards: Barry Westhead
- Bass: James 'Stel' Stelfoz
- Drums: Ben Byrne

Production

- Producer: Steve Osborne
- Mastering: Bob Ludwig and Andy "Hippy" Baldwin
- Engineer: Scott McCornick
- Management: Andrew, Martin, Steve and Claire
- Design: Joe Hollick
- Artwork: Daniel Meadows
- A&R: Chris Briggs
- Tea and sympathy: Barriemore Barlow
