= All the Plans (song) =

Single by Starsailor

from the album All the Plans
- Released: 22 June 2009
- Recorded: 2008
- Genre: Alternative rock
- Length: 4:11
- Label: Virgin, EMI
- Songwriter(s): James Walsh, James Stelfox, Barry Westhead, Ben Byrne
- Producer(s): Steve Osborne

Starsailor singles chronology
"Tell Me It's Not Over" (2009)	"All the Plans" (2009)

Music video
- All The Plans on YouTube

"All the Plans" is a song by the English alternative rock band, Starsailor. The song was officially announced as the second single of Starsailor's album of the same title on 16 April 2009 and was released on 22 June 2009. It was initially known as "All the plans we made".

== Production ==
NME wrote that Starsailor asked Ronnie Wood if he'd be up for playing some guitar on the record, and at the time he was busy promoting the film Shine A Light so there were a couple of months where he just wasn't available to do it." However, Walsh got an early morning call confirming Wood could play on the tune.

"Then I got a call about half-past-six one evening from his son Jesse saying, 'My dad really wants to do this now. Can you be at the studio [at] nine o'clock?' So from having sort of given up the ghost it all came together out of the blue. It was amazing; he stood there playing the guitar, saying the song reminded him of 'Maggie May' - quite high praise, indeed." James Walsh.

== Reception ==
The single gained media attention before the released of All the Plans due to the collaboration of Ronnie Wood in the recording of the song. The single has received positive reviews from the critics.

Dave Simpson from The Guardian said that: "writing about loves lost and lessons learned seems to have given singer/songwriter James Walsh real drive and focus, and Ronnie Wood guests to provide unlikely but perfectly suited Faces-style guitar.". Ok! Magazine stated that All the Plans was their favourite track of the whole album and called it "a fine return" else mentioning that "Tell Me It’s Not Over, All The Plans and Listen Up are all among their best work.".

Alex Lai from Contactmusic.com gave a positive review of the single stating that: " 'All The Plans' is a surprisingly enjoyable indie anthem that will sweep up the festival crowds.".

On 8 June 2009 Altsounds.com gave All the Plans a good review mentioning "the soft-focus Hammond Organ, delicate percussion and sparse and over-driven guitars (courtesy of Rolling Stones legend Ronnie Wood no less)", else adding that the song "it's heady Americana vibe is infectious and front man James Walsh has a truly stellar set of pipes (not exactly up there with either of the Buckley's but impressive all the same)"

== Music video ==
Starsailor playing All The Plans.

According to Starsailor official Message Board, All The Plan's music video was filmed live on 15 October 2008 during one of the band's gigs in the Hard Rock Cafe in London.

The music video was uploaded to Starsailor's YouTube channel on 19 June 2009. The music video for "All The Plans" shows a live performance of the song by the band accompanied by Pete Greenwood playing additional guitars on the song.
