= Tell Me It's Not Over =

Single by Starsailor

from the album All the Plans
- Released: 2 March 2009
- Recorded: 2007 – March 2008
- Genre: Alternative rock
- Length: 3:25
- Label: Virgin
- Songwriters: James Walsh, James Stelfox, Barry Westhead, Ben Byrne
- Producer: Steve Osborne

Starsailor singles chronology
"Keep Us Together" (2006)	"Tell Me It's Not Over" (2009)	"All the Plans" (2009)

Music video
- Tell Me It's Not Over on YouTube

"Tell Me It's Not Over" is the first single released from the 2009 album, All the Plans by the English alternative rock band, Starsailor. Its release date was announced on 18 October 2008 on their official website and later via YouTube by the lead singer James Walsh and Ben Byrne in their official Channel. It peaked # 73 in the UK Single Charts and #5 in the Belgium Charts making Tell Me It's Not Over their most successful single in Belgium.

The art cover for "Tell Me It's Not Over" was released on Starsailor's official website on 16 January 2009. The single was rescheduled the same day. Initially decided by the band to name their new single "Lights Out" or "Tell Me It's Not Over", it was performed for the first time at the music in my head festival in Paard van Troje, Den Haag, Netherlands in June 2007 and it was recorded between that year and March 2008.

Lyrically, "Tell Me It's Not Over" refers to a relationship near the end because of the adultery of his partner. The song almost makes reference to the possibility of forgiveness after an infidelity for the sake of the couple.

== Critical reception ==
Prior to the release of All The Plans, "Tell Me It's Not Over" has been well received by music critics. Daily Music Guide describes the song as "one departure from the old favourites, the superb 'Tell Me It's Not Over', a forthcoming release from the eagerly anticipated new album" and praised that "despite not breaking any new ground for the band, will no doubt appease their stock of devoted fans eagerly awaiting the albums release". Monique Oliver from Absolute Radio stated that 'Tell Me It's Not Over' "goes down well". Rich McLaughlin from The Alternate Side compares Starsailor's single with Joseph Arthur's "In the Sun".

On 23 February 2009 Limelife named "Tell Me It's Not Over" as the song of the day. Liz from Limelife wrote that: "the sadness, melancholy and mope are on full display here - and Starsailor works them to maximum indie rock effect". She else added that: "the much-repeated refrain, "tell me it's not over," may stir up memories of crying on the bathroom floor, but isn't that what all good emo rock is supposed to do?".

== Music video ==
James' partner in the Tell Me It's Not Over Music Video.

On 18 December 2008 it was published on Starsailor's Myspace a video from behind the scenes when the band were making the video directed by Dan Sully who has previously worked with Elbow. It was else announce that date that, "there will be an exclusive previewing of the video in its finished state shortly". The video was shot in North London.

On 9 January 2009 it was premiered in The Sun the full video.

The music video for "Tell Me It's Not Over" starts with James Walsh and his partner in a parking where she left him. Both of them (the girl presumably in the couple's home) look in a thoughtful way and seems to be doubting about the decision they have taken. Scenes of the band playing the song and the lights in different buildings being switched off and on harmonically with the song (which could be related to the first lines of the single chorus "now the lights out i discover...") are interpolated in the video. At the end of the video Walsh finally decided to enter the car.

The video features a White Mercedes-Benz W123 Estate.

On 19 January 2009 it was posted on MTV's official Myspace, and premiered in Myspace Chart on MTV Two, UK. It debuted on MTV chart one week later at number five on 26 January, making the best debut of that week on the channel.

== Cover versions ==
On 19 January 2009, when lead singer James Walsh was interviewed by Geoff Lloyd, he admitted that he had recorded a version of the lead single, "Tell Me It's Not Over" featuring Brandon Flowers from The Killers. The song was remixed by Flowers and Stuart Price and has since been leaked onto the internet.

According to the site administrator of the Starsailor Official Message Board, Boo, Brandon Flowers did in fact record, informally with James, vocals on a version of the song. This was actually meant to be a special secret surprise they had hoped to bring the fans at some time in the future. But at this stage, the recording was just a friendly collaboration between the two of them and does not yet have any official approval from Brandon or The Killers' management.

She also added that "James was put rather on the spot by Geoff Lloyd asking the question directly in that manner, as it was something we were hoping to keep under wraps for now - but James being a nice boy who was taught not to tell lies, then gave an honest answer".

Nevertheless, the song featuring Brandon Flowers has been played by Swindon 105.5 fm by JEB and XFM Radio.

== Format details ==
=== CD ===
1. "Tell Me It's Not Over"
2. "In Their World"

=== Digital Download ===
1. "Tell Me It's Not Over"
2. "Tell Me It's Not Over" (Stuart Price Radio Mix)
3. "Tell Me It's Not Over" (Thin White Duke Club Mix)

=== 7" heavyweight Vinyl ===
1. "Tell Me It's Not Over"
2. "All The Plans" (feat. Ronnie Wood)

=== Promo Single (CDS) ===
1. "Tell Me It's Not Over"
2. "Tell Me It's Not Over" (Instrumental)

== Charts ==
=== Weekly charts ===
Chart (2009)	Peak position
Belgium (Ultratop 50 Flanders)	5
Belgium (Ultratop 50 Wallonia)	20
UK Singles (Official Charts)	73

=== Year-end charts ===
Chart (2009)	Position
Belgium (Ultratop Flanders)	44
Belgium (Ultratop Wallonia)	92
