= All This Life =

Studio album by Starsailor
- Released: 1 September 2017
- Recorded: 2017
- Genre: Alternative rock, post-Britpop
- Length: 45:23
- Label: Cooking Vinyl
- Producer: Richard McNamara

Starsailor chronology
| Good Souls: The Greatest Hits (2015) | All This Life (2017) | Where the Wild Things Grow (2024) |

Singles from All This Life
- 1. "Listen To Your Heart" Released: 2017; 2. "All This Life" Released: 2017; 3. "Take a Little Time" Released: 2017

Professional ratings
Review scores
| Source | Rating |
|---|---|
| AllMusic | 4.5/5 stars |
| The Irish Times | 2/5 stars |
| musicOMH | 3/5 stars |

All This Life is the fifth studio album by English rock band Starsailor. It was released on 1 September 2017. It is the first studio album released by the band since 2009's All The Plans. It was produced by Embrace guitarist Richard McNamara.

== Background ==
The band had been on hiatus since 2009 while lead singer James Walsh and the other members concentrated on solo projects. The band reformed in 2015 with a tour to support their recent greatest hits album.

== Singles ==
Three singles have been released from the album - "Listen to Your Heart", "All This Life" and "Take a Little Time".

== All This Life Tour ==
The tour to support the album started in Cambridge on 12 October 2017 and continued to various venues across the UK.

| Date | City | Country | Venue |
|---|---|---|---|
UK 2017 Tour
| 12 October 2017 | Cambridge | England | Cambridge Junction |
| 13 October 2017 | Norwich | England | Waterfront |
| 14 October 2017 | Bristol | England | Bristol Bierkeller |
| 16 October 2017 | Leeds | England | Leeds Beckett Students Union |
| 17 October 2017 | Birmingham | England | O2 Institute 2 |
| 18 October 2017 | Sheffield | England | Sheffield Leadmill |
| 19 October 2017 | Liverpool | England | O2 Academy |
| 21 October 2017 | Newcastle | England | Boiler Shop |
| 22 October 2017 | Glasgow | Scotland | O2 ABC |
| 24 October 2017 | Manchester | England | O2 Ritz |
| 25 October 2017 | Brighton | England | Concorde 2 |
| 26 October 2017 | London | England | Koko |

== Critical reception ==
AllMusic called All This Life "a sophisticated, organically produced album that nicely balances the expansive lyricism of their early albums with the robust stadium rock they embraced during the mid- and late 2000s."

== Track listing ==
All tracks are written by James Walsh, James Stelfox, Ben Byrne, and Barry Westhead

| No. | Title | Length |
|---|---|---|
| 1. | "Listen to Your Heart" | 3:51 |
| 2. | "All This Life" | 2:54 |
| 3. | "Take a Little Time" | 3:25 |
| 4. | "Caught in the Middle" | 3:49 |
| 5. | "Sunday Best" | 5:23 |
| 6. | "Blood" | 4:51 |
| 7. | "Best of Me" | 3:37 |
| 8. | "Break the Cycle" | 3:18 |
| 9. | "Fall Out" | 5:52 |
| 10. | "Fia(F*** It All)" | 6:03 |
| 11. | "No One Else" | 2:14 |

== Chart positions ==
The album entered the UK Album chart at number 23 and stayed in the top 100 for one week.

== Personnel ==
- Vocals and Guitars: James Walsh
- Keyboards: Barry Westhead
- Bass: James 'Stel' Stelfox
- Drums: Ben Byrne

Production

- Producer, Mixer and Engineer: Richard McNamara
- Mastering: Nick Watson at Fluid Mastering
