= This Time (Starsailor song) =

2006 single by Starsailor

Single by Starsailor

from the album On the Outside
- Released: 23 January 2006
- Genre: Rock
- Length: 3:09
- Label: EMI
- Songwriter(s): James Walsh, James Stelfox, Ben Byrne, Barry Westhead
- Producer(s): Rob Schnapf

Starsailor singles chronology
"In the Crossfire" (2005)	"This Time" (2006)	"Keep Us Together" (2006)

Music video
- This Time on YouTube

"This Time" is a rock ballad written by the Britpop band Starsailor, which brings back the captivating sound of the piano of their latest singles that propelled them to their earlier success. This release followed a sell-out UK tour which culminated in a victorious show at London’s Brixton Academy. This Time peaked at number 24 on the UK Singles Chart, and remains their last single to reach the Top 40 in the UK.

== Music video ==
Picture of the couple trying to find each other during the video.

The promotional music video for 'This Time' is based on a concept of chaos theory commonly known as the butterfly effect. It was directed by ROJO (François Roland & Josef Baar). It shows a couple trying to find each other without success. The protagonist is going to meet his girlfriend at a bus or train station. He enters a store and buys a teddy bear for his girlfriend. Two hours later he gets hit by a train while driving. The video then appears to start again, two hours before, only this time he drops a coin at the store. This small event makes him a few seconds late over the first part of the music video which eventually saves him from the accident and gets him to realize that his girlfriend's letter says that they're going to meet at the radio station, not the station.

== Format details ==
=== CD ===
1. This Time
2. Push the Button (live Sugababes cover)

=== DVD ===
1. This Time (video)
2. In the Crossfire (Live from Brixton Academy) (video)
3. This Time (Live from Nottingham Rock City) (audio)
4. Believe Me (exclusive new track) (audio)

=== 7" Coloured Vinyl ===
1. This Time
2. Believe Me (exclusive new track)

== Charts ==
Chart (2006)	Peak position
UK Singles Chart	24
