= Giraffe (album) =

Studio album by Echoboy
- Released: February 10, 2003 (UK)
- Genre: Electropop
- Length: 50:43
- Label: Mute Records
- Producer: Flood

Echoboy chronology
Volume Two (2000)	Giraffe (2003)	Elektrik Soul Psymphonie (2005)

Giraffe is the third full-length album by British musician Richard Warren, released under his pseudonym, Echoboy. It was released on February 10, 2003 on Mute Records in the United Kingdom and on February 25 of that year in the United States. It was produced by Flood.

== Critical reception ==
Although Giraffe received generally favorable reviews from critics, not all reviews were favorable. Michael Idov of Pitchfork Media awarded the album a rating of 4.7 out of 10, describing the album as "50 minutes of structured wankery, as performed by a lone Brit with the questionable talent to put a chorus to a verse..."

Professional ratings
Aggregate scores
Source	Rating
Metacritic	(71%)
Review scores
Source	Rating
AllMusic	3.5/5 stars
Pitchfork Media	(4.7/10)
Stylus Magazine	(C+)
Exclaim!	(favorable)
PopMatters	(mixed)
MusicOMH	(favorable)
Robert Christgau	(choice cut)

== Track listing ==
1. Automatic Eyes
2. Don't Destroy Me
3. Comfort of the Hum
4. Summer Rhythm
5. High Speed in Love
6. Fun in You
7. Lately Lonely
8. Good on T.V.
9. Wasted Spaces
10. Nearly All the Time

== Personnel ==
- Rob Bailey Guitar (Electric)
- Kevin Bales Drums
- Dark Moor Mixing Assistant
- Flood Producer
- Pauline Kirke Cello
- Rob Kirwan Drum Programming, Engineer, Mixing
- Liz Chi Yen Liew Violin
- Nilesh "Nilz" Patel Mastering
- Mick Rock Photography
- Paddy Taylor Design
- Jayne Williamson Vocals
