= The Hybirds =

English indie band

The Hybirds were an English indie band, formed in the mid-1990s in Nottinghamshire.

Comprising Richard Warren, Darren Sheldon and Louis Divito, they evolved from the local bands The Front and Valve before signing to Heavenly Records, where they released singles such as "See Me Through". They split in the late 1990s, since when Warren has released solo work under the name of Echoboy, Modlang and The Cold Light of Day.

== Albums ==
- The Hybirds (Heavenly Records 1997 HVNLP 20CDP)

1. "Ball of Twine"
2. "24"
3. "I'm Coming Out"
4. "See Me Through"
5. "Call Me Blue"
6. "The Only Ones"
7. "Born Yesterday"
8. "The Wanderers"
9. "Stranded"
10. "Words"
11. "Suzy Parker"
12. "I Feel The Weight"
All songs by Richard Warren. Produced and mixed by Ian Grimble, except two produced by Richard Warren/Sebastian Lewsley, mixed by Paul Schroeder, seven mixed by Richard Warren. Recorded at Chateau de la Rouge Motte France, Abbey Road Studios London, West Heath Yard London. Strings arranged by Martin Green. 2 feat. Sebastian Lewsley on Moog. 7 feat. Sean Read on Hammond organ and piano. Mastered at Abbey Road Studios London by Chris Blair. Artwork by Max Speed. Photography by Hamish Brown.

== EPs ==
- Take You Down (Heavenly Records 1997 HVN71CD)

1. "Seventeen"
2. "Reeling"
3. "Peter Take Me Down"
4. "The Only Ones (Part Two)"
All songs by Richard Warren. 1-3 produced and mixed by Ian Grimble, 4 produced and mixed by Adi Winman. 1-3 recorded at Chateau de la Rouge Motte France. 4 recorded at Wessex Studio London. Cover art "Jill Kennington Parachuting" by John Cowan, 1965. Photography by Ellen Nolan.

== Singles ==
- "The Only Ones" (Heavenly Records 1997)

1. "The Only Ones (Part Two)"
2. "The Only Ones (Part Two) instrumental"
All songs by Richard Warren. Produced and mixed by Adi Winman. Recorded at Wessex Studio London. 10" vinyl only, issued in plain brown sleeve.

- "Take You Down" (Heavenly Records 1997 HVN71CD)

1. "Seventeen"
2. "Reeling"
3. "Peter Take Me Down"
4. "The Only Ones (Part Two)
All songs by Richard Warren. 1-3 produced by Ian Grimble. 4 produced by Adi Winman. Photography by John Cowan and Ellen Nolan.

- "Stranded" (Heavenly Records 1997 HVN75CD)

1. "Stranded"
2. "Freedom Fighter"
3. "Morning Song"
All songs by Richard Warren. Produced and mixed by Ian Grimble. Recorded at Chateaux de la Rouge Motte France. Artwork by Max Speed. Photography by Mark McNulty.

- "24" (Heavenly Records 1997 HVN78CD)

1. "24"
2. "Where I Want To Be"
3. "Tell Me"
All songs by Richard Warren. 1 produced by Richard Warren/Sebastian Lewsley, mixed by Paul Schroder. 2-3 produced and mixed by Ian Grimble Recorded at Chateaux de la Rouge Motte France. 1 feat. Sebastian Lewsley on Moog. Artwork by Max Speed. Photography by Mark McNulty.

- "See Me Through" (Heavenly Records 1998 HVN80CD)

1. "See Me Through"
2. "Good"
3. "You"
4. "The Only Ones (John Peel session)"
All songs by Richard Warren. 1 produced and mixed by Ian Grimble, 2-3 produced and mixed by Richard Warren/Sebastian Lewsley. 1 recorded at Chateaux de la Rouge Motte France. 2-3 recorded at West Heath Yard London. 4 taken from the bands' John Peel Session, first transmission date 17 September 1997, recorded in Studio 4 Maida Vale London. Artwork by Max Speed. Photography by Mark McNulty.

== Peel Sessions ==
- 17 September 1997, Maida Vale 4, London

- "24"
- "The Only Ones"
- "Stranded"
- "Born Yesterday"
Richard Warren, Louis Divito, Darren Sheldon, Lee Horsley, Sebastian Lewsley
