= Four to the Floor =

2004 single by Starsailor

Single by Starsailor

from the album Silence Is Easy
- B-side: "A Message"
- Released: 1 March 2004
- Length: 3:54 (radio edit); 4:13 (album version)
- Label: EMI
- Songwriters: James Walsh; James Stelfox; Ben Byrne; Barry Westhead
- Producers: Danton Supple; Starsailor

Starsailor singles chronology
"Born Again" (2003)	"Four to the Floor" (2004)	"In the Crossfire" (2005)

Music video
- "Four to the Floor" on YouTube

"Four to the Floor" is a song by British band Starsailor. The song was released as the third and final single from the band's second album, Silence Is Easy (2003), and became a hit, peaking at number one in France and Wallonia, number five in Australia, and number 24 in the United Kingdom. The Thin White Duke remix of the song was ranked number 70 on Triple J's Hottest 100 of 2004 in Australia. As of July 2014, it was the 84th best-selling single of the 21st century in France, with 333,000 units sold.

== Music videos ==
Left to right: James Stelfox, James Walsh and Ben Byrne in the orchestra version of "Four to the Floor" music video.

There are two different videos for "Four to the Floor". In the first one, filmed for the album version of the song, the band played in a scenario accompanied by the members of a symphonic orchestra appearing and disappearing according to the development of the song and the instruments.

The band seen as a graffito.

The second video, filmed for the Thin White Duke remix, features a genderless little person of unknown age in a hooded winter jacket spray-painting graffiti on public walls in or near the city of London. The band members of Starsailor are depicted as animated graffiti whilst playing the title song throughout. At the end of the video the faceless, anonymous elfin creature is caught while standing on a bridge and shaken down by the police. One of the scenes in the video can be seen as the art cover for the Hard-Fi single "Hard to Beat".

The video also shows the images of famous Argentine revolutionary Che Guevara, and Ben Byrne wears a T-shirt with the word "socialism", though there is not a clear connection between those images and the concept of the video.

== Track listings ==
UK CD single

1. "Four to the Floor" (radio edit)
2. "A Message"

UK 10-inch single

A1. "Four to the Floor" (radio edit)
A2. "A Message"
B1. "Four to the Floor" (Thin White Duke mix)

German mini-CD single

1. "Four to the Floor" – 4:11
2. "At the End of a Show" – 4:12

European maxi-CD single

1. "Four to the Floor"
2. "At the End of a Show"
3. "White Dove" (original demo)

Australian maxi-CD single

1. "Four to the Floor"
2. "Four to the Floor" (Soulsavers mix)
3. "Four to the Floor" (Thin White Duke mix)

== Charts ==
=== Weekly charts ===
Original version

Chart (2003–2005)	Peak position
Australia (ARIA)	5
Australian Club Chart (ARIA)	6
Belgium (Ultratop 50 Flanders)	8
Belgium (Ultratop 50 Wallonia)	1
CIS Airplay (TopHit)	27
CIS Airplay (TopHit) Thin White Duke mix	27
Europe (Eurochart Hot 100)	8
France (SNEP)	1
Germany (GfK)	82
Italy (FIMI)	22
Romania Airplay (Romanian Top 100)	88
Russia Airplay (TopHit)	24
Russia Airplay (TopHit) Thin White Duke mix	21
Scottish Singles Sales (Official Charts)	18
Spain (Promusicae)	9
Switzerland (Schweizer Hitparade)	14
Ukraine Airplay (TopHit)	64
Ukraine Airplay (TopHit) Thin White Duke mix	94
UK Singles (Official Charts)	24

Ofenbach remix

Chart (2026)	Peak position
Belgium (Ultratop 50 Wallonia)	35
Estonia Airplay (TopHit)	73
France (SNEP)	51
Latvia Airplay (LaIPA)	14
Poland Airplay (OLiS)	9
Romania Airplay (TopHit)	73

=== Monthly charts ===
Ofenbach remix

Monthly chart performance
Chart (2026)	Peak position
Estonia Airplay (TopHit)	98
Romania Airplay (TopHit)	86

=== Year-end charts ===
Chart (2003)	Position
CIS Airplay (TopHit)	100
Russia Airplay (TopHit)	77
Ukraine Airplay (TopHit)	91

Chart (2004)	Position
Australia (ARIA)	19
Australian Club Chart (ARIA)	14
France (SNEP)	16

Chart (2005)	Position
Belgium (Ultratop 50 Flanders)	48
Belgium (Ultratop 50 Wallonia)	21
Europe (Eurochart Hot 100)	71
France (SNEP)	78
Russia Airplay (TopHit) Thin White Duke mix	200
Switzerland (Schweizer Hitparade)	95

== Certifications ==
Region	Certification	Certified units/sales
Australia (ARIA)	Platinum	70,000^{^}
France (SNEP)	Gold	333,000
France (SNEP) Ofenbach remix	Gold	100,000^{‡}
^{^} Shipments figures based on certification alone.^{‡} Sales+streaming figures based on certification alone.

== Release history ==
Region	Date	Format(s)	Label(s)	Ref.
United Kingdom	1 March 2004	10-inch vinyl; CD	EMI	
Australia	22 March 2004	CD	EMI	
France	28 October 2004	CD	EMI; Capitol	
