= Keep Us Together =

2006 single by Starsailor

Single by Starsailor

from the album On the Outside
- Released: 8 May 2006
- Label: EMI
- Songwriter(s): James Walsh, James Stelfox, Ben Byrne, Barry Westhead
- Producer(s): Rob Schnapf

Starsailor singles chronology
"This Time" (2006)	"Keep Us Together" (2006)	"Tell Me It's Not Over" (2009)

Music video
- Keep Us Together on YouTube

"Keep Us Together" is the third and final single from the 2005 album On the Outside by British band Starsailor. It peaked at number 47 on the UK Singles Chart, spending just one week in the top 75. The song has been used frequently by BBC's main football television programme Match of the Day.

== Music video ==
A 'fireworks river' being thrown while Walsh is playing the guitar

The video promo for "Keep Us Together" starts with a light framing the band. The band continue playing the song with some fireworks around them at the end of the video. In some scenes during the video the camera get out of focus the band members and at the end of the video they're covered with confetti.

== Track listing ==
1. "Keep Us Together"
2. "Rise Up"

== Charts ==
Chart (2006)	Peak position
UK Singles Chart	47
Ireland Singles Chart	47
