= In the Crossfire =

2005 single by Starsailor

Single by Starsailor

from the album On the Outside
- Released: 3 October 2005
- Length: 3:14
- Label: EMI
- Songwriters: James Walsh, James Stelfox, Ben Byrne, Barry Westhead
- Producer: Rob Schnapf

Starsailor singles chronology
"Four to the Floor" (2004)	"In the Crossfire" (2005)	"This Time" (2006)

Music video
- In The Crossfire on YouTube

"In the Crossfire" is a song written by English post-Britpop band Starsailor that talks about the suffering of people who have lived the Iraq War. The song says "I hear them screaming on the radio, it's getting louder in the crossfire, trying to find some hope from the ashes of their broken homes".

This is the first political song of the band which denounced the alliance of Prime Minister Tony Blair with president George W. Bush (I don't see myself when I look at the flag) during the war on Iraq. It peaked at number 22 on the UK Singles Chart.

"In the Crossfire" shows a more mature and heavier-sounding Starsailor, unique from what they have done before. Noticeably, it shows a marked distance between the sound of other britpop groups like Coldplay.

== Video ==
"In the Crossfire" was directed by Paul Gore and shows the band playing in a disused railway station in London creating a serious atmosphere with it.

The video depicts the band locked inside of a greenhouse for the majority of the video until they finally break it using the sound of their guitars. The video's aesthetics are in line with the heavier sound that can be seen in the band's third studio album On the Outside.

== Track listings ==
=== CD, 7" ===
1. "In the Crossfire"
2. "Always"

=== DVD ===
1. "In the Crossfire" (video)
2. "Four to the Floor" (live at Somerset House - video)
3. "In the Crossfire" (audio)
4. "Empty Streets" (audio)

== Charts ==
Chart (2005)	Peak position
UK Singles Chart	22
