= Richard Warren (musician) =

English musician, songwriter and producer

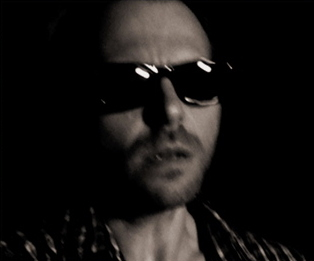

Background information
- Also known as: Echoboy, Modlang
- Born: Richard Daniel Warren; 3 June 1973 (age 53); Sutton-in-Ashfield, Nottinghamshire, England
- Occupations: Singer-songwriter, musician, producer
- Labels: Heavenly Recordings (1996–1999); Pointblank Records (1999–2001); Mute Records (1999–2003); Earworm Records (1999–2005); TV Records (2010–2011); Hudson Records (2017–)
- Formerly of: The Hybirds

Richard Daniel Warren (born 3 June 1973) is an English musician, songwriter and producer.

Warren has performed with the groups The Hybirds and The Cold Light of Day and as a solo artist as Echoboy, Modlang and under his own name.

== Career ==
Warren signed his first record deal with Heavenly Recordings at the height of Britpop in 1996, as one third of The Hybirds.

In 1999 when the band split, he branched out on his own and away from guitar-led pop, signing to Mute Records as Echoboy after Daniel Miller heard his releases on Earworm Records following his self-released 12" Flashlegs (Suite). Warren went on to release several self-produced solo albums on Mute as well as Giraffe, which was produced by Flood, and having put together a band he toured extensively with, amongst others, Elastica, Add N to (X) and Broadcast.

Both Echoboy and The Hybirds performed several sessions for John Peel's radio show.

Warren is also known for producing and remixing for other artists (see below).

In 2003, he was asked by Jason Pierce to play bass guitar in Spiritualized, with whom he toured throughout 2003–05. He also played bass on and co-engineered the band's 2008 album Songs in A&E.

During 2005 to 2006, Warren released a set of five limited edition 7" singles under the pseudonym Modlang.

During 2005 to 2009, he played guitar with both Starsailor and Soulsavers with Mark Lanegan, playing guitar on the 2009 Starsailor album All the Plans and on the Soulsavers albums It's Not How Far You Fall, It's the Way You Land and Broken. He also co-wrote two of the songs on Broken.

In 2008, Warren formed The Cold Light of Day, releasing the limited edition EP Flesh and Blood in April 2009.

In October 2009, he left The Cold Light of Day to pursue other projects and released a solo album Laments in July 2010, which made it into the NME's '50 best albums of the year so far' list.

His next album, The Wayfarer was released on 17 October 2011. An alternative 'stripped down' mix of the album was issued as a cover-mount on the autumn double edition (no.78/79) of Bucketfull of Brains and nine short films containing these 'stripped down' mixes were made to accompany the album.

Jarvis Cocker said on his BBC Radio 6 Music radio show (1 January 2012), that The Wayfarer was 'one of my fave albums that came out last year'.

Warren's third solo album Rich Black Earth was released on 4 November 2013.

During 2014, Warren worked on a project called Kings of the South Seas with Ben Nicholls (Dennis Hopper Choppers, The Full English (folk music archive)) and Evan Jenkins (Neil Cowley Trio). The album Kings of the South Seas was released on 17 November 2014.

He also played guitar with Samantha Crain on some of her UK shows during the summer of 2014.

Warren's fourth solo album Disentangled was released on Hudson Records on 15 September 2017.

Franklin, the second album by Kings of the South Seas, was released on 2 February 2018.

== The Hybirds ==
=== Band members ===
Richard Warren, Louis Divito, Darren Sheldon

=== Albums ===
- The Hybirds (Heavenly 1997 HVNLP 20CDP)

1. "Ball of Twine"
2. "24"
3. "I'm Coming Out"
4. "See Me Through"
5. "Call Me Blue"
6. "The Only Ones"
7. "Born Yesterday"
8. "The Wanderers"
9. "Stranded"
10. "Words"
11. "Suzy Parker"
12. "I Feel the Weight"
All songs by Richard Warren . Produced and mixed by Ian Grimble, except 2 produced by Richard Warren/Sebastian Lewsley, mixed by Paul Schroeder, 7 mixed by Richard Warren. Recorded at Chateau de la Rouge Motte France, Abbey Road Studios London, West Heath Yard London. Strings arranged by Martin Green. 2 feat. Sebastian Lewsley on Moog. 7 feat. Sean Read on Hammond organ and piano. Mastered at Abbey Road Studios London by Chris Blair. Artwork by Max Speed. Photography by Hamish Brown.

=== EPs ===
- Take You Down (Heavenly 1997 HVN71CD)

1. "Seventeen"
2. "Reeling"
3. "Peter Take Me Down"
4. "The Only Ones (Part Two)"
All songs by Richard Warren. 1-3 produced and mixed by Ian Grimble, 4 produced and mixed by Adi Winman. 1-3 recorded at Chateau de la Rouge Motte France. 4 recorded at Wessex Studio London. Cover art Jill Kennington Parachuting by John Cowan, 1965. Photography by Ellen Nolan.

=== Singles ===
- The Only Ones (Part Two) (Heavenly 1996 HVN6310)

1. "The Only Ones (Part Two) – Main Mix"
2. "The Only Ones (Part Two)- Instrumental"
3. "The Only Ones (Part Two) – Alternative Mix"
All songs by Richard Warren. Produced and mixed by Adi Winman. Recorded at Wessex Studio London. 10" vinyl only, Limited Edition, issued in plain brown sleeve.

- Stranded (Heavenly 1997 HVN75CD)

1. "Stranded"
2. "Freedom Fighter"
3. "Morning Song"
All songs by Richard Warren. Produced and mixed by Ian Grimble. Recorded at Chateaux de la Rouge Motte France. Artwork by Max Speed. Photography by Mark McNulty.

- 24 (Heavenly 1997 HVN78CD)

1. "24"
2. "Where I Want to Be"
3. "Tell Me"
All songs by Richard Warren. 1 produced by Richard Warren/Sebastian Lewsley, mixed by Paul Schroder. 2-3 produced and mixed by Ian Grimble Recorded at Chateaux de la Rouge Motte France. 1 feat. Sebastian Lewsley on Moog. Artwork by Max Speed. Photography by Mark McNulty.

- See Me Through (Heavenly 1998 HVN80CD)

1. "See Me Through"
2. "Good"
3. "You"
4. "The Only Ones (John Peel Session)"
All songs by Richard Warren. 1 produced and mixed by Ian Grimble. 2-3 produced and mixed by Richard Warren/Sebastian Lesley. 4 produced by Paul Long, engineered by Lisa Softly. 1 recorded at Chateaux de la Rouge Motte France. 2-3 recorded at West Heath Yard London. 4 taken from the John Peel Session, first transmission date 17 September 1997, recorded in Studio 4 Maida Vale London. Artwork by Max Speed. Photography by Mark McNulty.

== Echoboy ==
=== Band members ===
Richard Warren, Kev Bales, Tony (Doggen) Foster, Lee Horsley, Leon Tattersall, Chris Moore, John Lord, Sam Hempton, Dan Hayhurst, Pete Bassman

=== Albums ===
- Echoboy (Pointblank 1999 HELL002)

1. "Flashlegs (Suite)"
2. "Flesh"
3. "Scene 30"
4. "Wrap"
5. "Daylight"
6. "Flight 21"
7. "Mountain Song"
8. "Signs"
All songs by Richard Warren. Produced and mixed by Richard Warren. Vocals on 6 by Roy Foster. Photography by Martin Nesbitt. Artwork by Richard Warren and Martin Nesbitt.

- Volume 1 (Mute 2000 STUMM180)

1. "55"
2. "Kit and Holly"
3. "Model 352"
4. "Broken Hearts"
5. "Constantinople"
6. "Crocodile Milk"
7. "Walking"
8. "Contact"
All songs by Richard Warren. Produced and mixed by Richard Warren. Voice on 7 by Tasha Lee McCluney. Photography by Richard Warren. Design by P.A. Taylor.

- Volume 2 (Mute 2000 STUMM192)

1. "Turning On"
2. "Telstar Recovery"
3. "Kelly's Truck"
4. "Siobhan"
5. "Make the City the Sound"
6. "Schram and Sheddle 262"
7. "Sudwestfunk No.5"
8. "Circulation"
9. "High Pitch Needs"

With free 7":

- Do the Isolation

1. "Do the Isolation"
2. "Hotel 75"
All songs by Richard Warren. Produced and mixed by Richard Warren. Drums on 1 and 4 by Kev Bales. Mastered by Kevin Metcalfe. Photography by Richard Warren. Design by Intro.

- 45:54:00 (Pointblank 2001 HELL004)

One 45 minute musical collage piece, made up of improvised instrumental sections from 10 live shows in 2001.
All songs by Richard Warren. Produced and mixed by Richard Warren. Artwork by Richard Warren.

- Giraffe (Mute 2003 STUMM200)

1. "Automatic Eyes"
2. "Don't Destroy Me"
3. "Comfort of the Hum"
4. "Summer Rhythm"
5. "High Speed in Love"
6. "Fun in You"
7. "Lately Lonely"
8. "Good on TV"
9. "Wasted Spaces"
10. "Nearly All the Time"
All songs by Richard Warren. Produced and mixed by Flood, engineered and mixed by Rob Kirwan. Mix assisted by Darkmoor. Source material recorded at The Bedroom, London, The Instrument, London, Main Street, Leicestershire, Alfreton Road, Sutton-in-Ashfield, Baselab, Nottingham, The Big Mouse House, Nottingham. Mastered by Nilesh Patel at The Exchange, London. Song construction at The Bedroom, London. Mixed at The Instrument, London. Design by P.A. Taylor. Photography by Mick Rock. Screenprint by Dan Holliday.

- Elektrik Soul Psymphonie (Earworm 2005 EGS05 / The First Time Records 2007 TFT019)

1. "Mary from San Francisco"
2. "Interlude No.1"
3. "Lovesick Antelopes"
4. "Interlude No.2"
5. "Electric Soul (Suite)"
6. "Death Drums"
7. "Interlude No.3"
8. "Pale"
9. "Jet Brown"
10. "Yellow Stripes"
11. "Messin' with Dan"
12. "Interlude No.4"
13. "The Grip"
14. "Plastic Gods"
15. "Interlude No.5"
16. "Invincible"
17. "Innocent, Clueless and Young"
18. "Red Wall, Little White Lights"
19. "Interlude No.6"
20. "43"
All songs by Richard Warren. Produced and mixed by Richard Warren. Tape loop manipulation on 11 by Dan Hayhurst. Artwork by Joe Bales. Design by Richard Warren.

=== EPs ===
- Flashlegs (Suite) (Pointblank 1999 HELL001)

1. "Flashlegs (Suite)"
2. "Breakfast"
3. "11.22"
12" vinyl, numbered limited edition of 250, in hand-printed sleeve. Artwork by Richard Warren.

- Frances Says the Knife Is Alive (Mute 1999)

1. "Canada"
2. "Frances Says the Knife Is Alive"
3. "Touched"
4. "Slow Down Sheena"
Double 10" vinyl, cd.
Drums on 3 by Kev Bales. Fender Rhodes piano on 1 by Lee Horsley. Artwork by Richard Warren and Martin Nesbitt.

- Pure New Wool (Pointblank 1999 HELL003, for US FU007)

1. "Temporarily Drifting"
2. "57-59 (Bite the Bullet)"
3. "She"
4. "Pure New Wool"
Drums on 1 and 4 by Louis Divito. Bass on 4 by Darren Sheldon. Pedal steel guitar on 4 by B. J. Cole. Artwork by Richard Warren.

All songs by Richard Warren. Produced and mixed by Richard Warren.

=== Singles ===
- Scene 30 (Earworm 1999 WORM42)

1. "Scene 30"
2. "Vitamins and Oil"
Limited edition 10" vinyl in hand-printed sleeve.
Produced and mixed by Richard Warren.

- Constantinople (Mute 2000 MUTE242)

1. "Constantinople"
2. "Usherettes"
12" vinyl
Produced and mixed by Richard Warren.

- Kit and Holly (Mute 2000 MUTE246)

1. "Kit and Holly"
2. "East Sheen"
7" vinyl
1. "Kit and Holly"
2. "Sixteen Drums"
3. "Don't Cross the Sea"
cd
Produced and mixed by Richard Warren. Photography courtesy of Corbis.

- Telstar Recovery (Mute 2000 MUTE256)

1. "Telstar Recovery"
2. "Moving"
3. "Pressure Drop"
4. "Scarab Major 3000"
12" vinyl, cd
Drums on 2 by Kev Bales. Guitar on 2 by Tony (Doggen) Foster. Produced and mixed by Richard Warren.

- Turning On (Mute 2001 MUTE257)

1. "Turning On"
2. "Every Household Should Have One"
3. "I'll Always Remember"
4. "Shortwave"
12" vinyl, cd
Drums on 1 by Kev Bales. Produced and mixed by Richard Warren.

- Turning On (Remixes) (Mute 2001 MUTE257)

1. "Sudwestfunk No.5 (Esther Brinkmann Mix)"
2. "Turning On (Red Snapper Mix)"
3. "Siobhan (Click 'n' Follow Mix by Thomas Fehlmann)"
4. "Angel Band"
Double 12" vinyl
Drums by Kev Bales. Produced and mixed by Richard Warren.

- Automatic Eyes (Mute 2003 MUTE277)

1. "Automatic Eyes"
2. "I Love You"
1 Produced and mixed by Flood. Engineered and mixed by Rob Kirwan. Mix assisted by Darkmoor. 2 produced and mixed by Richard Warren.
7" vinyl
1. "Automatic Eyes"
2. "So Far Away"
3. "Blackened"
cd
1 Produced and mixed by Flood. Engineered and mixed by Rob Kirwan. Mix assisted by Darkmoor. 2-3 Produced and mixed by Richard Warren.

- Lately Lonely (Mute 2003 MUTE293)

1. "Lately Lonely"
2. "Blue Green Star"
7" vinyl
Drums on 1 by Kev Bales. 1 Produced and mixed by Flood. Engineered and mixed by Rob Kirwan. Mix assisted by Darkmoor. Mastered by Nilesh Patel at The Exchange, London. 2 Produced and mixed by Richard Warren. Mastered by Guy Davie at The Exchange, London.
1. "Lately Lonely"
2. "Bastard Cartel"
3. "Getting Older Not Growing Up"
cd
Drums on 1 by Kev Bales. 1 Produced and mixed by Flood. Engineered and mixed by Rob Kirwan. Mix assisted by Darkmoor. Mastered by Nilesh Patel at The Exchange, London. 2-3 Produced and mixed by Richard Warren.

- Good on TV (Mute 2003 MUTE313)

1. "Good on TV"
2. "The Jungle Room"
7" vinyl
1 Produced and mixed by Flood. Engineered and mixed by Rob Kirwan. Mix assisted by Darkmoor. Mastered by Nilesh Patel at The Exchange, London. 2 Produced and mixed by Richard Warren.
1. "Good on TV"
2. "Syd"
3. "Soul Defender"
cd
1 Produced and mixed by Flood. Engineered and mixed by Rob Kirwan. Mix assisted by Darkmoor. Mastered by Nilesh Patel at The Exchange, London. Photograph of Frances Nesbitt by Sue Nesbitt. 2-3 Produced and mixed by Richard Warren.

- 43 (Enraptured 2006 RAPT4545)

1. "43"
2. "Burning Down"
Limited edition 7" vinyl
Produced and mixed by Richard Warren. All songs by Richard Warren. Artwork by Richard Warren. Design by P.A. Taylor.

== Modlang ==
=== Band members ===
Richard Warren

=== Singles ===
- "Slaughtered by the Sun" (Decimal 2005 POINT001)
- "Annie" (Decimal 2005 POINT002)
- "New Black Light Machine" (Decimal 2005 POINT003)
- "Blackhand" (Decimal 2006 POINT004)
- "I Can Only Love You For a Lifetime" (Decimal 2006 POINT005)

All one-sided 7" vinyl, numbered limited editions of 200.
All songs by Richard Warren. Produced and mixed by Richard Warren. Drums by Kev Bales. Saxophone on "Blackhand" by Art Tattersall. Artwork by Richard Warren.

== The Cold Light of Day ==
=== Band members ===
Richard Warren, Huw Costin, Jim Widdop, Jeff Davenport, Lee Horsley

=== EPs ===
- Flesh and Blood
1. "Texan Girls"
2. "How Could You Be So Blind"
3. "Sunshine Gone"
4. "Black Stone Empires"

1, 3 by Huw Costin. 2, 4 by Richard Warren. Produced and mixed by Richard Warren. Artwork by Richard Warren.

== Richard Warren ==
=== Albums ===
- Laments (2010 TV010)

1. "The Devil's My Shepherd"
2. "How Could You Be So Blind?"
3. "It's a Crying Shame"
4. "No Companion Like Solitude"
5. "Brother Mary"
6. "Fool Killer"
7. "Make My Life Right"
8. "Nature Boy"
9. "For Someone"
10. "Black Stone Empires"
11. "No Angel"
Drums on 3,4,7,8,9 by Kev Bales. Drums on 2 by Jeff Davenport. Piano/organ/Fender Rhodes on 2,3,4,7,8,9,10 by Lee Horsley. Pedal steel guitar on 2,10 by Jim Widdop.
All songs by Richard Warren. Produced and mixed by Richard Warren. Mastered by Noel Summerville (Metropolis). Artwork by Richard Warren and Steve Gullick. Photography by Steve Gullick.

- The Wayfarer (2011 TV013)

1. "Rivington Street"
2. "The Lonesome Singer in the Apocalypse Band"
3. "The Wayfarer"
4. "The Backslider"
5. "Johnny Johnny"
6. "Through the Fire"
7. "Wasteland"
8. "The Willow"
9. "My Heart (Ragged and Broken)"
All songs by Richard Warren. Produced and mixed by Richard Warren. Mastered by Noel Summerville. Artwork by Richard Warren and Steve Gullick. Photography by Steve Gullick.

- The Wayfarer (Stripped Down Version) (2011 TV013CDBOB) – an alternative version of the album issued free with the Bucketfull of Brains magazine (No.79)

1. "Rivington Street"
2. "The Lonesome Singer in the Apocalypse Band"
3. "The Wayfarer"
4. "The Backslider"
5. "Johnny Johnny"
6. "Through the Fire"
7. "Wasteland"
8. "The Willow"
9. "My Heart (Ragged and Broken)"
All songs by Richard Warren. Produced and mixed by Richard Warren. Mastered by Noel Summerville. Artwork by Richard Warren and Steve Gullick. Photography by Steve Gullick.

- Rich Black Earth (Decimal 2013 D007CD / D007LP / D007DL)

1. "Ox"
2. "Rot and Rust"
3. "Rich Black Earth"
4. "Judgement Seat"
5. "Flowers"
6. "Know"
7. "Weeping Tree"
8. "The Berry and the Thorn"
All songs by Richard Warren. Produced and mixed by Richard Warren.

- Disentangled (Hudson Records 2017 HUD003LP / HUD003LPX)

1. "Only Always"
2. "Last Breath"
3. "Simplify"
4. "Silvertown"
5. "No Way Back"
6. "Safekeeping"
7. "Disentangled"
8. "Mystery Land"
9. "The Deepest Well"
10. "Withered Tree"
All songs by Richard Warren. Produced and mixed by Richard Warren.

=== Singles ===
- No Angel (2010 TV009)

1. "No Angel (Radio Version)"
2. "I Got Loaded"
3. "No Angel"
1, 3 by Richard Warren. 2 by Camille Bob. Produced and mixed by Richard Warren. Artwork by Richard Warren.

- The Lonesome Singer in the Apocalypse Band (2011 TV014)

1. "The Lonesome Singer in the Apocalypse Band"
2. "Wasteland"
3. "Wasteland ('stripped down' mix)"
All songs by Richard Warren. Produced and mixed by Richard Warren. Artwork by Richard Warren.

- The Devil in Concordia Parish (Decimal 2012 POINT006)

Limited edition of 100 hand-numbered cds available exclusively at Rough Trade West on Record Store Day 2012.
Song by Richard Warren. Produced and mixed by Richard Warren. Artwork by Richard Warren.

== Production ==
- The Hybirds
- Echoboy
- Modlang
- The Cold Light of Day
- Electrelane
- Punish The Atom
- David Viner
- Noah Kelly
- 22-20s
- Starsailor
- The Kull
- Tenebrous Liar

== Remixes ==
- Longpigs – "The Frank Sonata (Echoboy Remix)" (Mother Records 1999)
- The Paradise Motel – "Derwent River Star (Echoboy Remix)" (Infectious Records 1999)
- Luke Slater – "All Exhale (Echoboy Remix)" (Novamute Records 1999)
- Omega Amoeba – "Retro Failure (Echoboy Remix)" (Heavenly)
- Gerling – "Suburban Jungle Sleeping Bag (Echoboy Remix)" (Infectious Records 2000)
- Starsailor – "Good Souls (Echoboy Remix)" (Chrysalis 2001)
- Electrelane – "Film Music (Echoboy Remix)" (Let's Rock! Records 2001)
- Puressence – "Ironstone Isadora (Echoboy Remix)" (Island Records 2002)
- Doves – "Words (Echoboy Remix)" (Heavenly 2003)
- Punish the Atom – "Filthy Boy (Echoboy Remix)"
- Doves – "Some Cities (Echoboy Remix)" (Heavenly 2005)
- King Creosote – "Not One Bit Ashamed (Modlang Remix)" (2005)
- Starsailor – "Keep Us Together (Modlang Remix)" (2006)
- Delta 5 – "Mind Your Own Business (Echoboy Remix)" (2009)

== Engineer/co-engineer ==
- Spiritualized Songs in A & E (Spaceman Records 2008)
- Yoko Ono "Walking on Thin Ice (Yoko Ono and Jason Pierce Remix)" from Yes, I'm a Witch (Astralwerks 2007)
- Junior Kimbrough "Sad Days and Lonely Nights (performed by Spiritualized)" from Sunday Nights: The Songs of Junior Kimbrough (Fat Possum Records 2004)

== Guitar/vocals ==
- Spiritualized
- Starsailor
- Soulsavers
- The Sons of T C Lethbridge
- The Time and Space Machine
- Jon Boden

== Original TV music ==
- Revealing Secrets (Channel 4 2001)

== Songwriting ==
- Soulsavers – "Death Bells", '"Shadows Fall", from Broken (V2 Records 2009)

== The Peel Sessions ==
=== The Hybirds ===
- 17 September 1997, Maida Vale 4, London

- "24", "The Only Ones", "Stranded", "Born Yesterday"
Richard Warren, Louis Divito, Darren Sheldon, Lee Horsley, Sebastian Lewsley

=== Echoboy ===
- 19 September 1999, Maida Vale 3, London

- "Zero", "Atonal Apples", "Daylight", "Frances Says the Knife Is Alive"
Richard Warren, Doggen Foster, Kev Bales, Lee Horsley

- 5 November 2000, Maida Vale 4, London

- "Sudwest Funk No.5", "Schram and Sheddle 262", "Turning On", "Siobhan"
Richard Warren, Lee Horsley, Leon Tattersall, Sam Hempton, Dan Hayhurst, Pete Bassman

- 30 October 2002, Boat Club, Nottingham

- "Automatic Eyes", "Summer Rhythm", "Wasted Spaces", "Lately Lonely"

- 12 February 2003, Maida Vale 4, London

- "Lately Lonely", "Automatic Eyes", "High Speed in Love", "Wasted Spaces"
Richard Warren, Lee Horsley, Leon Tattersall, Pauline Kirk, Chris Moore

== Rough Trade compilations ==
- Rough Trade Shops: 25 Years – "Flashlegs (Suite)" (Mute Records 2001)
- Rough Trade Shops: Counter Culture 05 – "Slaughtered by the Sun" (V2 Records 2006)

== Other compilations ==
- The Tell-Tale Signs of Earworm – "Smiler" (Earworm 1999)
- Sonar 2000 – "Kit and Holly" (So Dens 2000)
- Manchester United – Beyond the Promised Land – "Flashlegs (Suite)" (Virgin Records 2000)
- More Tell-Tale Signs of Earworm – "Scene 30" (Earworm 2001)
- Textures and Tones – "One Gay Shoe" (Music House 2004)
- Where the Sea Meets the Sky – "Death Drums" (Earworm 2005)
- Escale #01 – "43" (lecargo.org)

== Selected press ==
- The Hybirds reviews and videos (NME website)
- Echoboy:Volume 2 review (The Independent 2000)
- Echoboy:Giraffe review (Dusted 2003)
- Echoboy:Giraffe review (Uncut 2003)
- Echoboy:Elektrik Soul Psymphonie review (New York Time Out)
- Laments interview (Soundblab 2010)
- Laments: NME 50 best albums of the year so far (NME 2010)
- Mark McNulty blog
- The Wayfarer review (middleboopmag.com 2011)
- The Wayfarer review (subba-cultcha.com 2011)
- The Wayfarer review (The Independent 2011)
- The Wayfarer review (6 Days From Tomorrow 2011)
- Rich Black Earth review (6 Days From Tomorrow 2013)
- Rich Black Earth reviews (Q and Uncut magazines 2013)
- Disentangled review (Americana UK 2017)
