= Silence Is Easy (song) =

2003 single by Starsailor

Single by Starsailor

from the album Silence Is Easy
- B-side: "Could You Be Mine?"; "She Understands"
- Released: 1 September 2003
- Length: 3:40
- Label: EMI
- Songwriter: Starsailor
- Producer: Phil Spector

Starsailor singles chronology
"Poor Misguided Fool" (2002)	"Silence Is Easy" (2003)	"Born Again" (2003)

Music video
- Silence Is Easy on YouTube

"Silence Is Easy" is the first single from the album of the same name by British pop band Starsailor. The song reached number nine on the UK Singles Chart, which is the band's highest position on the UK chart. The song also reached number 40 in Ireland and number 70 in the Netherlands. It was one of two songs on the album that was produced by Phil Spector.

== Music video ==
James Walsh walking among the people in the club during the video.

The video takes place in a nightclub. Walsh walks through the middle of a crowd of people with a stoic expression on his face which only changes when he is singing. While he's walking the people around him have varying attitudes: some seem to love him and others clearly dislike him. A man puts his hands on James and screams at his face, which contrasts with a woman who is so happy after watching him that it makes her cry. There are also some boys that clap him on the back to encourage him, a woman with a wedding dress and a transgender person who tries to kiss him.

== Track listings ==
UK, European, and Australian CD single

1. "Silence Is Easy"
2. "Could You Be Mine?"
3. "She Understands"

UK and European limited-edition 7-inch single

A. "Silence Is Easy"
B. "She Understands"

UK DVD single

1. "Silence Is Easy" (video)
2. Behind the scenes interview
3. "Could You Be Mine?" (audio)
4. "Good Souls" (live 2003)

== Credits and personnel ==
Credits are lifted from the UK CD single liner notes.

Studio

- Mastered at Sterling Sound (New York City)

Personnel

- Starsailor – writing
- Ruth Gottlieb – violin
- Gillon Cameron – violin
- Rob Spriggs – viola
- Sarah Wilson – cello
- Phil Spector – production
- Danton Supple – engineering
- Michael H. Brauer – mixing
- Nathaniel Chan – mixing assistance
- Greg Calbi – mastering
- Yacht Associates – art direction
- Rick Guest – photography

== Charts ==
Chart (2003)	Peak position
Ireland (IRMA)	40
Netherlands (Single Top 100)	70
Scottish Singles Sales (Official Charts)	8
UK Singles (Official Charts)	9

== Release history ==
Region	Date	Format(s)	Label(s)	Ref(s).
United Kingdom	1 September 2003	7-inch vinyl; CD; DVD	EMI	
Australia	29 September 2003	CD	EMI	
United States	12 January 2004	Triple A radio	Capitol	
