= Love Is Here =

Studio album by Starsailor
- Released: 8 October 2001
- Recorded: April–May 2001
- Studios: Rockfield (Rockfield, Wales)
- Genres: Indie rock; indie pop; post-Britpop
- Length: 57:19
- Label: Chrysalis
- Producers: Steve Osborne; Mark Aubrey; Starsailor

Starsailor chronology
Love Is Here (2001)	Silence Is Easy (2003)

Singles from Love Is Here
- 1. "Fever" Released: 5 February 2001; 2. "Good Souls" Released: 23 April 2001; 3. "Alcoholic" Released: 17 September 2001; 4. "Lullaby" Released: 10 December 2001; 5. "Poor Misguided Fool" Released: 18 March 2002

Love Is Here is the debut studio album by rock band Starsailor, released on 8 October 2001 by Chrysalis Records. After finalising their line-up, a positive review from NME started a bidding war between record labels that eventually saw the band sign to EMI. Following the making of some demos, "Fever" and "Good Souls" were released as singles on 4 February 2001 and 23 April 2001, respectively. The band recorded their debut album at Rockfield Studios with producer Steve Osborne over the course of six weeks. Love Is Here features acoustic guitars accompanied by gentle piano chords, earning it comparisons to the albums Parachutes (2000) by Coldplay, and The Invisible Band (2001) by Travis.

Between June and August 2001, Starsailor supported Dido and Travis on their co-headlining tour of the United States, toured Australia, and performed at the Witnness and V Festivals. "Alcoholic" was released as a single on 17 September 2001, which was followed by a tour of the United Kingdom. They played a handful of US shows at the end of the year; "Lullaby" was released as a single on 10 December 2001. To promote the US release of Love Is Here, the band supported the Charlatans, and went on a headlining tour in that territory. "Poor Misguided Fool" was released as a single on 18 March 2002, which was promoted with a US trek as part of the MTV Campus Invasion tour.

Love Is Here received generally favourable reviews from music critics, some of whom praised the production and songwriting. The album charted at number two in the UK, while also reaching the top 40 in Austria, Denmark, Germany, Ireland, Italy, New Zealand, Norway, and Scotland. It would later be certified platinum in the UK. All of the singles peaked within the top 40 of the UK Singles Chart, with "Alcoholic" charting the highest at number ten. "Good Souls" and "Alcoholic" also charted in Ireland and the Netherlands. Love Is Here appeared on several publications' best-of-the-year album lists, by the likes of Musikexpress, NME, and Q, among others.

A 20th anniversary expanded edition of the album was scheduled to be released in December 2021, but was delayed until January 2022 due to pressing delays of the vinyl edition.

== Background and production ==
Starsailor were formed in 1996 in Wigan by fellow students James Walsh on vocals and guitar, James Stelfox on bass, and Ben Byrne on drums. They spent four-and-a-half year playing small venues in North West England. After several line-up changes, Barry Westhead was brought in on keyboards at the beginning of 2000. Walsh's brother Andrew worked at a management company and at Heavenly Records, and was impressed with his brother's vocal delivery and songwriting. He booked the band for two shows in London in April 2000, which saw a writing from the NME in attendance. The writer posted a highly positive review for one of the shows, which in turn started a bidding war between record labels. Andrew Walsh began co-managing the band with his boss from Heavenly, Martin Kelly.

Mark Collen, the managing director of EMI imprint Chrysalis Records, had witnessed one of the shows, and expressed interest only halfway through the opening song of the set. As Heavenly had ties with EMI, Walsh and Kelly were positive in having the band under EMI's direction; in July 2001, the band eventually signed to the company. James Walsh said they picked that label as they "haven't got anything that sounds like us at all". The band also signed a publishing deal with EMI Music Publishing, who proceeded to finance the making of a few demos. In January and February 2001, the band toured the UK as part of the NME Carling Awards tour. Due to the high quality of the demos, and the public's need for product, one of the demos, "Fever", was released as a single on 5 February 2001. It had been produced by Mark Aubrey and the band.

Also in February 2001, they performed on T4, The Late Late Show, and Top of the Pops. Following this, the band went on headlining tours of mainland Europe in March 2001, and then the UK in April 2001. "Good Souls" was released as a single on 23 April 2001, produced by Steve Osborne. After this stint, the band began recording their debut album. Sessions occurred in April and May 2001 over the course of six weeks at Rockfield Studios. Osborne produced the sessions; Adrian Bushby served as recording engineer, with Pro Tools engineer Bruno Ellingham. Osborne did additional production on "Fever"; he mixed the recordings, before they were mastered by Ray Staff at Whitfield Street.

== Composition and lyrics ==
Love Is Here has been compared to Parachutes (2000) by Coldplay, and The Invisible Band (2001) by Travis. The album sees acoustic guitars matched with gentle piano chords, with Walsh's vocals recalling Jeff Buckley, and Richard Ashcroft of the Verve. It saw the band lumped into the New Acoustic Movement, a scene that involved Travis and Badly Drawn Boy which blurred the lines between indie rock and folk rock. Discussing the title, Walsh said the phrase acted as the album's theme, intending it to be "uplifting and positive, because everything around at the moment seems to have quite a cynical edge". He said they intentionally wanted it to sound like Grace (1994) by Buckley and Harvest (1972) by Neil Young.

Love Is Here opens with the Eastern-influenced "Tie Up My Hands", which evolved out of an earlier folk version. The Tindersticks-esque "Poor Misguided Fool" starts with a New Order-indebted intro section, and continues with a strumming pattern in the vein of "Coffee & TV" (1999) by Blur. Walsh said it was a "bit of a riposte to the coke addled A&R men from an angry young man with a fragile ego". A version of "Alcoholic" had been around for a few years, and was left unfinished until Westhead joined the band. Walsh started "Lullaby" in his bedroom after seeing a headline in Uncut, and was later worked on with the band at their rehearsal space. "Way to Fall" is in triple metre time; it talks about taking risks. Walsh came up with the song in the studio while in the middle of making a documentary on the sessions.

The psychedelia track "Talk Her Down" plays out as a Spaghetti Western film. It was written after Walsh repeatedly saw a girl in a club, and began fantasising about her life. "Love Is Here" evoked the sound of Zero 7; Walsh referred to it as "another call to arms to the unlucky in love". "Good Souls" was compared to the work of the Verve and Embrace, due to its Hammond organ and use of strings. Walsh said it was the oldest track on the album, and was his attempt at writing something in the vein of the Charlatans and Primal Scream. When compared to the demo version, the album's closing track "Coming Down" was pared down to a vocal-and-guitar arrangement. Walsh said it was about the pain a person experiences after the end of a relationship; it tells the story of two drug addicts in love. It includes a hidden track of the band humming, which Osborne made the band do after they had a few drinks.

== Release ==
In June and July 2001, Starsailor appeared at Fleadh festival in the UK, before supporting Dido and Travis on their co-headlining tour of the United States, and then toured Australia. On 25 July 2001, Love Is Here was announced for release in less than three months' time, and the album's track listing was posted online. They played three warm-up shows, leading up to an appearance at the Witnness and V Festivals in August 2001. "Alcoholic" was released as a single on 17 September 2001. Two versions were released on CD: the first with an "Let I Shine", an alternative version of "Alcoholic", and the music video for the song, while the second featured a cover of "Grandma's Hands" (1971) by Bill Withers, and a remix of "Good Souls". Love Is Here was released on 8 October 2001 through Chrysalis Records, which coincided with a UK tour that ran into the following month. "Good Souls" was released to US radio stations on 4 December 2001. The band played a small number of US shows prior to an appearance on Late Night with Conan O'Brien; "Lullaby" was released as a single on 10 December 2001. The CD version featured "From a Whisper to a Scream", a live version of "Tie Up My Hands", and the music video for "Lullaby", while the DVD version included audio for "From a Whisper to a Scream", a live version of "Love Is Here", the "Lullaby" music video, and interviews. They ended the year supporting the Charlatans on their three-date arena tour in the UK.

Love Is Here was released in the US on 8 January 2002, which was promoted with a full tour of that territory supporting the Charlatans throughout the month, and an appearance on The David Letterman Show and Saturday Night Live. In March 2002, the band went on a headlining tour of the US, culminating in a performance at South by Southwest. "Poor Misguided Fool" was released as a single on 18 March 2002. The CD version included "Born Again", a remix of "Poor Misguided Fool", and the music video for the song, while the DVD version featured audio for "Born Again" and "Hot Burrito #2", the "Poor Misugided Fool" music video, and interviews. The band returned to the US as part of the MTV Campus Invasion tour throughout April 2002. The band had to cancel some European festival dates due to Walsh becoming a father; they ultimately appeared at the Hultsfred and Roskilde Festivals the following month. Shortly afterwards, they played at the Glastonbury and V festivals. In September 2002, the Love Is Here Live video album was released; it included a live show from the previous year, alongside music videos and a tour film.

== Critical reception ==
Professional ratings
Aggregate scores
Source	Rating
Metacritic	72/100
Review scores
Source	Rating
AllMusic	4/5 stars
Alternative Press	8/10
Entertainment Weekly	A−
The Guardian	3/5 stars
NME	8/10
Pitchfork	5.7/10
Q	4/5 stars
Rolling Stone	3/5 stars
Slant Magazine	4/5 stars
Uncut	3.5/5 stars

Love Is Here was met with generally favourable reviews from music critics. At Metacritic, which assigns a normalised rating out of 100 to reviews from mainstream publications, the album received an average score of 72, based on 19 reviews.

AllMusic reviewer MacKenzie Wilson wrote that while the band was not as "polished as its counterparts", the album stood as a "beautiful piece of work". She praised the band's decision to "go for something more positive as well -- each song soars with intricate musicianship and melodic lushness". In a review for Entertainment Weekly, David Browne saw the band as being "more sensitive and gracefully shambolic" than their contemporaries "thanks to [the] overheated, self-absorbed" Walsh, as well as the "tumbling, rustic-countryside beauty of their music". Victoria Segal of NME commended the band for making an album of "real emotional depth", with "an alluring assurance that means that even at its most vulnerable [...] there's an edge that pushes them way beyond the feathery, big-eyed, hatchling indie of Coldplay". Slant Magazine's Sal Cinquemani wrote that Walsh's lyrics are "often obscure [...] but sting with each and every syllable". He added that "[b]rutal honesty resounds with every lyric, organ moan and guitar chord".

The Guardian writer John Aizlewood referred to the band as being "both throwback and peek into the future", highlighting Westhead's "strident" piano parts and Walsh's "hyperventilating near-falsetto", making it sound like an "intricately produced tempest of an album". Pitchfork contributor Christopher Dare complimented Osborne for being able to "craft a truly special sound here, lush and yet conveying an acoustic atmosphere". Though he criticised the majority of the songs for "sound[ing] too similar", as well as for Walsh's repetitive lyricism. Jenny Eliscu of Rolling Stone said Walsh's "willowy-falsetto" enhanced some of the songs; however, it was a "shame his vocals invite close listening, because the lyrics tend to be pretty silly, full of mock profundities". Blender's David Quantick said that if the album had a fault, it was due to the "slightly hand-wringing lyrics, which, if not overwrought, are certainly pretty darned wrought. A striking debut, but you might hope for a slightly broader emotional palette on future albums".

== Commercial performance and accolades ==
Love Is Here charted at number two in the UK after selling over 58,000 copies in the first week. It ranked at number 77 and 81 on the UK year-end charts for 2001 and 2002, respectively. It also reached number two in Scotland, number four in Ireland, number 12 in Denmark, number 20 in Italy, number 23 in Norway, number 25 in Austria, number 26 in Germany, number 37 in New Zealand, number 42 in Sweden and the Flanders region of Belgium, number 68 in Australia and the Netherlands, number 72 in Switzerland, number 78 in France, and number 129 on the US Billboard 200.

"Fever" charted at number 18 in the UK. "Good Souls" charted at number 12 in the UK, number 43 in Ireland, and number 82 in the Netherlands. "Alcoholic" charted at number ten in the UK, number 42 in Ireland, and number 89 in the Netherlands. "Lullaby" charted at number 36 in the UK. "Poor Misguided Fool" charted at number 23 in the UK. Love Is Here was certified platinum in the UK by the British Phonographic Industry (BPI). Q listed Love Is Here as one of the best 50 albums of 2001, while NME rated it as the fifth best album of the year.

== Track listing ==
All songs written by Starsailor.

1. "Tie Up My Hands" – 5:46
2. "Poor Misguided Fool" – 3:51
3. "Alcoholic" – 2:56
4. "Lullaby" – 4:13
5. "Way to Fall" – 4:30
6. "Fever" – 4:03
7. "She Just Wept" – 4:12
8. "Talk Her Down" – 4:11
9. "Love Is Here" – 4:41
10. "Good Souls" – 4:53
11. "Coming Down" – 14:30 (ends at 3:10; a hidden track begins at 13:30.)

== Personnel ==
Personnel per booklet.

Starsailor

- James Walsh – vocals, guitar
- James Stelfox – bass guitar
- Ben Byrne – drums
- Barry Westhead – keyboards

Production and design

- Steve Osborne – producer (all except track 6), mixing, additional production (track 6)
- Adrian Bushby – recording engineer, mix engineer (track 10)
- Bruno Ellingham – Pro Tools engineer
- Mark Aubrey – producer (track 6)
- Starsailor – producer (track 6)
- Ray Staff – mastering
- Image State – cover photography
- Tom Sheehan – band photography
- Mary Scanlon – band photography
- Adjective Noun – sleeve design

== Charts and certifications ==
=== Weekly charts ===
Weekly chart performance for Love Is Here
Chart (2001)	Peak position
Australian Albums (ARIA)	68
Austrian Albums (Ö3 Austria)	25
Belgian Albums (Ultratop Flanders)	42
Danish Albums (Hitlisten)	12
Dutch Albums (Album Top 100)	68
French Albums (SNEP)	78
German Albums (Offizielle Top 100)	26
Irish Albums (IRMA)	4
Italian Albums (FIMI)	20
New Zealand Albums (RMNZ)	37
Norwegian Albums (VG-lista)	23
Scottish Albums (Official Charts)	2
Swedish Albums (Sverigetopplistan)	42
Swiss Albums (Schweizer Hitparade)	72
UK Albums (Official Charts)	2
US Billboard 200	129

=== Year-end charts ===
Year-end chart performance for Love Is Here
Chart (2001)	Position
UK Albums (OCC)	77
Chart (2002)	Position
Canadian Alternative Albums (Nielsen SoundScan)	156
UK Albums (OCC)	81

=== Certifications ===
Certifications for Love Is Here
Region	Certification	Certified units/sales
United Kingdom (BPI)	Platinum	300,000^{^}
^{^} Shipments figures based on certification alone.
