= Boy in Waiting =

EP by Starsailor
- Released: 3 December 2008
- Recorded: 2007–2008
- Length: 13:04
- Label: Virgin
- Producer: Steve Osborne

Starsailor chronology
On the Outside (2005)	Boy in Waiting (2008)	All the Plans (2009)

Professional ratings
Review scores
Source	Rating
Action Radio	(Positive)

Boy in Waiting is an EP by English alternative rock band Starsailor, released on 3 December 2008 as a Free Digital Download worldwide for those who pre-ordered the Deluxe edition of their album All the Plans through Starsailor.net. It features some of the tracks which did not make it onto All the Plans.

== Track listing ==
Starsailor.net confirmed four songs for Boy In Waiting one day before the release. Three of these did not make All The Plans, except for Boy In Waiting

The track listing of Boy In Waiting EP is:

1. "Boy in Waiting" – 2:33
2. "Do You Believe In Love" – 3:20
3. "Black Limousine" – 3:06
4. "Darling Be Home Soon" (The Lovin' Spoonful cover) – 4:39
