= Silence Is Easy =

Studio album by Starsailor
- Released: 15 September 2003
- Genre: Post-Britpop, baroque pop
- Length: 39:40
- Label: EMI
- Producer: Danton Supple; John Leckie; Phil Spector

Starsailor chronology
Love Is Here (2001)	Silence Is Easy (2003)	On the Outside (2005)

Singles from Silence Is Easy
- 1. "Silence Is Easy" Released: 1 September 2003; 2. "Born Again" Released: 17 November 2003; 3. "Four to the Floor" Released: 1 March 2004

Professional ratings
Aggregate scores
Source	Rating
Metacritic	53/100
Review scores
Source	Rating
AllMusic	4/5 stars
Drowned in Sound	3/10
E!	A−
Entertainment Weekly	B+
The Guardian	3/5 stars
Pitchfork	4.9/10
Q	3/5 stars
Rolling Stone	2/5 stars
Slant Magazine	3/5 stars
Uncut	4/10

Silence Is Easy is the second studio album by English indie rock group Starsailor, released in September 2003 on EMI Records. The album cover is loosely based on Echo & the Bunnymen's Heaven Up Here. The song "Some of Us" was featured in an episode of Bones titled "A Boy in a Bush" and in the closing credits of the Belgian film The Memory of a Killer (a.k.a. The Alzheimer Case). The album contains some of the last productions by Phil Spector before his murder conviction and imprisonment in 2009, and before his death in 2021 ("Silence Is Easy" and "White Dove"). The album sold 54,296 copies in its opening week of release, charting at No. 2 on the UK Albums Chart. It was certified gold in the UK in 2003.

== Critical reception ==
Silence Is Easy was met with "mixed or average" reviews from critics. At Metacritic, which assigns a weighted average rating out of 100 to reviews from mainstream publications, this release received an average score of 53 based on 16 reviews.

In a review for AllMusic, critic reviewer Matt Collar wrote: "Mixing alternative rock aesthetics with a melodic pop sensibility, Silence Is Easy finds the band in pretty much the same place as before with slightly better songwriting, a more mature vocal performance by Walsh, and tastefully grandiose production. The 11 tracks here, including the two Spector-produced numbers, are heartfelt, melodic rockers with some string backgrounds that fit well into the overall aesthetic of cinematic pop romanticism." At Drowned in Sound, Gareth Dobson gave an unfavourable three out of ten score to the release, calling it a "perfected brand of middle-class miserablism". Caroline Sullivan of The Guardian called the album "attractive listening, and it's hard not to be moved by its tenderness."

Writing for Pitchfork, John O'Connor wrote: "Starsailor revels in all of these romantic pretensions on Silence Is Easy, their melodramatic, overproduced, but not altogether unpleasant sophomore release. Defiantly sappy, Silence Is Easy survives mostly on Walsh's oddly graceful singing. Unfortunately, the music on the whole is prosaic, even boring at times."

Playlouder ranked it at number eight on their list of the 20 worst albums of the year.

== Track listing ==
No.	Title	Length
1.	"Music Was Saved"	3:00
2.	"Fidelity"	2:22
3.	"Some of Us"	3:37
4.	"Silence Is Easy"	3:40
5.	"Telling Them"	4:51
6.	"Shark Food"	3:35
7.	"Bring My Love"	2:20
8.	"White Dove"	3:52
9.	"Four to the Floor"	3:50
10.	"Born Again"	6:03
11.	"Restless Heart"	2:01

North American bonus tracks
No.	Title	Length
12.	"Could You Be Mine?"	3:33
13.	"At the End of a Show"	4:12

Limited edition bonus CD
No.	Title	Length
1.	"Four to the Floor" (Thin White Duke Remix)	8:11
2.	"Four to the Floor" (Soulsavers Mix)	5:12
3.	"Poor Misguided Fool" (Soulsavers Remix)	4:39
4.	"Good Souls" (Two Lone Swordsmen Remix)	5:50
5.	"Good Souls" (Echoboy Remix)	5:17
6.	"Good Souls" (Soulsavers Remix)	5:37

== Personnel ==
- Ben Byrne – drums
- James 'Stel' Stelfox – bass guitar
- James Walsh – vocals, guitar
- Barry Westhead – keyboards
- Percussion: Luis Jardim
- Double bass: Arnulf Lindner
- Violins: Ruth Gottilieb, Gillon Cameron, Howard Gott, Wendy De St Paer, louise Peacock, Brian Wright, Claire Raybould, Katherine Watmough, Tim Myall, Anna Giddey, Catherine Browning, Alison Blunt, Calina De La Mare, Anna Morris, Gini Ball and Sally Herbert
- Violas: Rob Spriggs, Vince Greene, Sophie Sirota, Emily Frith, Lucy Theo and Fiona Friffith
- Cellos: Sarah Willson, Helen Thomas, Andy Nice, Ian Burdge and Emily Isaac

Production

- Producer: Danton Supple, Starsailor, John Leckie, Mark Aubrey, Phil Spector
- Engineer: Danton Supple, Mark Aubrey, John Leckie and Chris Brown
- Additional engineer: Britt Myers
- Programmer John Dunne
- Mixer: Michael H. Brauer, The Soulsavers
- Assistance: Nathaniel Chan
- Mastering: Greg Calbi, Miles Showell
- String arrangements: Leo Abrahams
- Art direction: Yacht Associates
- Photograph: Rick Guest

== Charts ==
=== Weekly charts ===
Weekly chart performance for Silence Is Easy
Chart (2003)	Peak position
Austrian Albums (Ö3 Austria)	17
Belgian Albums (Ultratop Flanders)	8
Belgian Albums (Ultratop Wallonia)	25
Danish Albums (Hitlisten)	17
Dutch Albums (Album Top 100)	31
Finnish Albums (Suomen virallinen lista)	40
French Albums (SNEP)	47
German Albums (Offizielle Top 100)	20
Irish Albums (IRMA)	25
Italian Albums (FIMI)	13
Norwegian Albums (VG-lista)	35
Scottish Albums (OCC)	2
Swiss Albums (Schweizer Hitparade)	24
UK Albums (OCC)	2

=== Year-end charts ===
Year-end chart performance for Silence Is Easy
Chart (2003)	Position
UK Albums (OCC)	107

== Certifications ==
Certifications for Silence Is Easy
Region	Certification	Certified units/sales
United Kingdom (BPI)	Gold	100,000^{^}
^{^} Shipments figures based on certification alone.
