= Cambridge Junction =

Music and arts venue in Cambridge, England

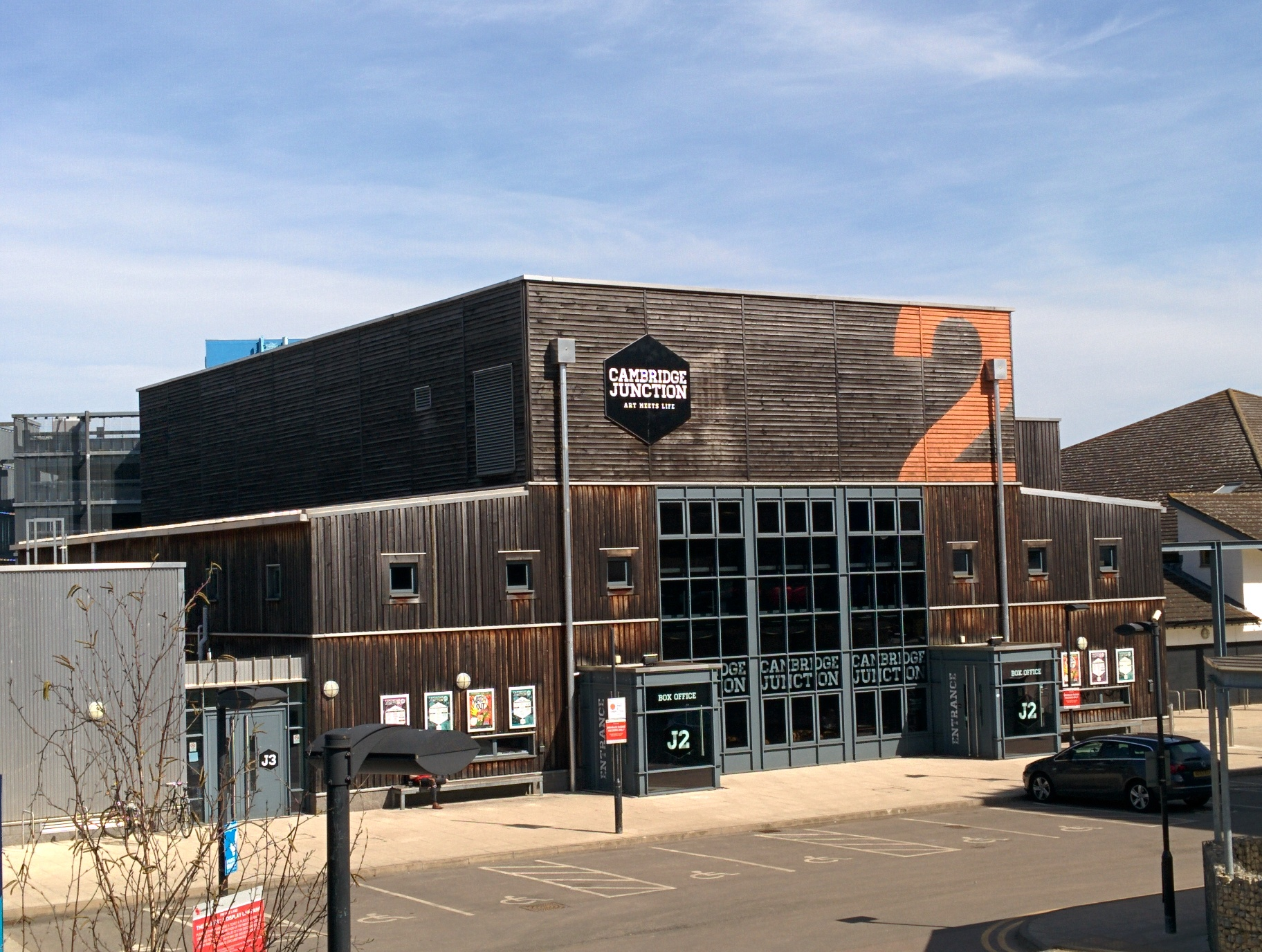
- Junction 2
- Interactive map of Cambridge Junction
- Location: Clifton Way, Cambridge CB1 7GX
- Coordinates: 52°11′26.7″N 0°8′11.5″E
- Owner: Junction CDC Ltd
- Capacity: 850 (main hall)
- Type: Live music
- Events: Music, Comedy, Theatre, Dance

Construction
- Opened: 1990

Website
- www.junction.co.uk

Cambridge Junction is a live music and arts venue in Cambridge, England.

The principal venue was opened to the south of the railway station and on the site of the city's former Cattle Market in 1990, as "The Junction". Two smaller spaces were added in 2005.

== Spaces ==
The Junction incorporates three performance spaces: Junction 1 with a standing capacity of 850, Junction 2 which is a seated theatre with a capacity of 220, and Junction 3 which is a smaller multipurpose space.

Junction 1 is mainly a live music venue, though it also hosts more popular comedians and club nights. Junction 2 and Junction 3 host theatre, dance, music and comedy.
