= On the Outside (Starsailor album) =

Studio album by Starsailor
- Released: 17 October 2005
- Recorded: April – May 2005
- Genre: Alternative rock, indie rock
- Length: 38:48
- Label: EMI
- Producer: Rob Schnapf

Starsailor chronology
Silence Is Easy (2003)	On the Outside (2005)	Boy in Waiting (2008)

Singles from On the Outside
- 1. "In the Crossfire" Released: 3 October 2005; 2. "This Time" Released: 23 January 2006; 3. "Keep Us Together" Released: 8 May 2006

On the Outside is the third studio album by British rock band Starsailor. The album was released on 17 October 2005. It was led by the first single, "In the Crossfire" on 3 October 2005. On the Outside has been certified Silver in the UK.

The song "Jeremiah" was written about the death of Jeremiah Duggan, James Walsh having heard Duggan's mother talking about it on the radio.

== Reception ==
Professional ratings
Aggregate scores
Source	Rating
Metacritic	64/100
Review scores
Source	Rating
AllMusic	3.5/5 stars
Gigwise	3/5 stars
NME	7/10
The Observer	3/5 stars
Pitchfork	4.7/10
Slant Magazine	3/5 stars
Yahoo! Music	6/10 stars

On the Outside was met with generally favourable reviews from music critics. At Metacritic, which assigns a normalized rating out of 100 to reviews from mainstream publications, the album received an average score of 64, based on ten reviews.

== Track listing ==
1. "In the Crossfire" – 3:16
2. "Counterfeit Life" – 3:31
3. "In My Blood" – 3:55
4. "Faith Hope Love" – 2:48
5. "I Don't Know" – 3:20
6. "Way Back Home" – 3:10
7. "Keep Us Together" – 3:47
8. "Get Out While You Can" – 3:07
9. "This Time" – 3:32
10. "White Light" – 4:34
11. "Jeremiah" – 3:39
12. "Empty Streets" – 3:36

== Charts ==
Chart performance for On the Outside
Chart (2005)	Peak position
Austrian Albums (Ö3 Austria)	33
Belgian Albums (Ultratop Flanders)	24
Belgian Albums (Ultratop Wallonia)	72
Dutch Albums (Album Top 100)	56
French Albums (SNEP)	111
German Albums (Offizielle Top 100)	93
Italian Albums (FIMI)	59
Scottish Albums (OCC)	12
Swiss Albums (Schweizer Hitparade)	25
UK Albums (OCC)	13

== Certifications ==
Certifications for On the Outside
Region	Certification	Certified units/sales
United Kingdom (BPI)	Silver	60,000^{^}
^{^} Shipments figures based on certification alone.
