= Born Again (Starsailor song) =

Single by Starsailor

from the album Silence Is Easy
- Released: 17 November 2003
- Length: 6:03 (album version); 4:46 (radio edit)
- Label: EMI
- Songwriter: Starsailor
- Producers: Danton Supple, Starsailor

Starsailor singles chronology
"Silence Is Easy" (2003)	"Born Again" (2003)	"Four to the Floor" (2004)

Music video
- Born Again on YouTube

"Born Again" is the second single from the album Silence Is Easy by British pop band Starsailor, released in 2003. It peaked at number 40 in the UK Charts.

== Music video ==
The video enters a painting and shows the images of a couple living in a farm house. The woman (interpreted by Violet Wilson) finds an envelope in the jacket from her lover after he leaves her. She is seen drowning in a lake, being carried by her lover, and sitting on a bed watching the window with a sad expression on her face. The alternative version contains more scenes of the couple inside this peaceful "natural scene" of the painting where they live, while the original video shows the band playing "Born Again."

== Track listings ==
=== CD, 7" ===
1. "Born Again" (Radio Edit) - 4:46
2. "At the End of a Show" - 4:14

=== Limited edition CD (with 4 postcard prints) ===
1. "Born Again" (Radio Edit) - 4:46
2. "White Dove" (Original Demo) - 3:19
3. "Silence Is Easy" (Live) - 5:07
4. "Born Again" (Enhanced Video - Alternative Version)

=== DVD ===
1. "Born Again" (Video)
2. "White Dove" (Original Demo) (Audio)
3. "A Short Documentary" (Video)

== Charts ==
Chart (2003)	Peak position
UK Singles Chart	40
