= Starsailor (band) =

English alternative rock band

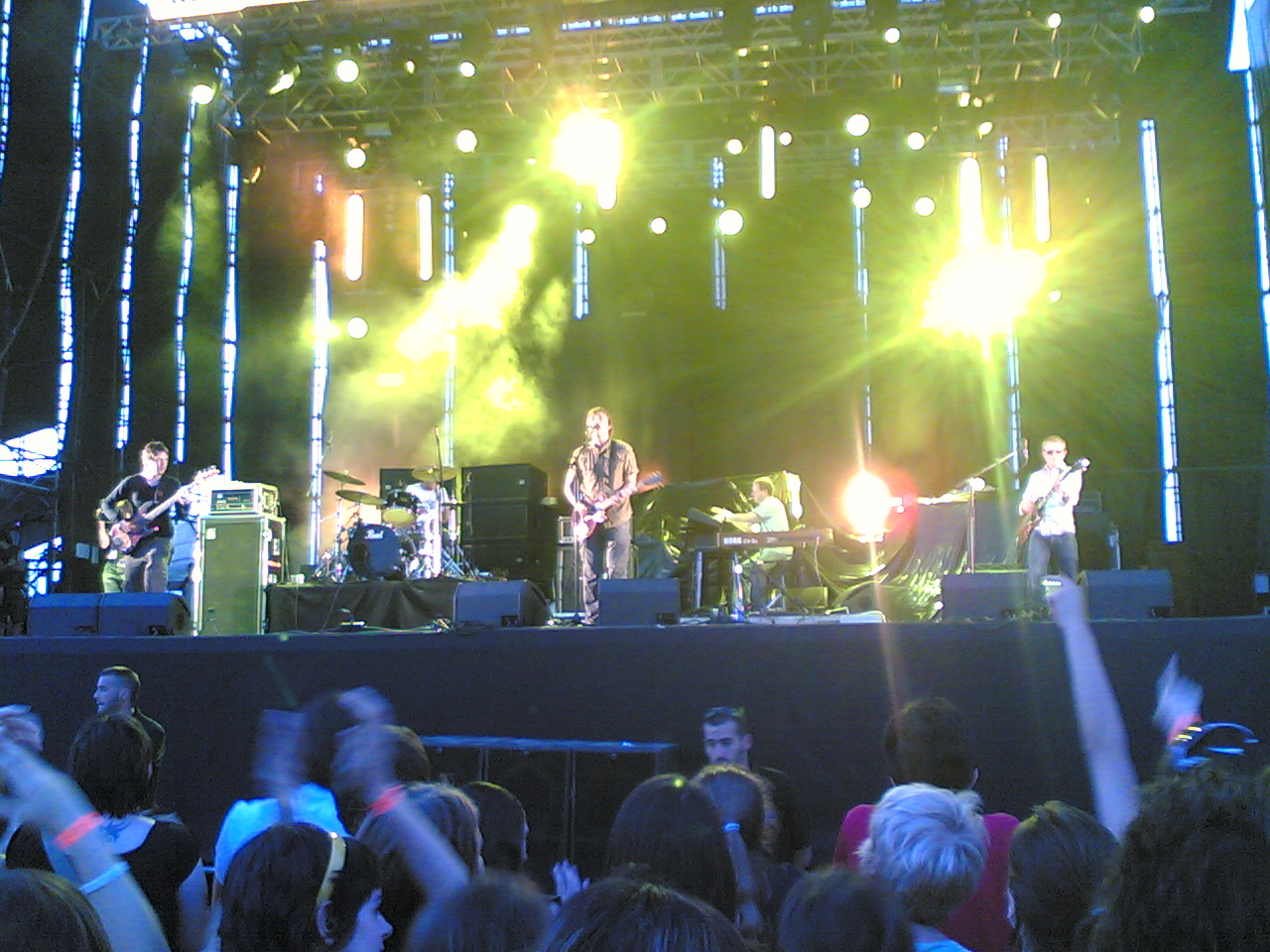
- Starsailor live at Summercase Festival, Madrid. From left: Ben Byrne (on drums), James Walsh, Barry Westhead and James Stelfox

Background information
- Origin: Warrington, Cheshire, England
- Genres: Alternative rock, post-Britpop
- Years active: 2000–2009, 2014–present
- Labels: Chrysalis (2000–2003); EMI (2003–2006); Virgin (2008–present); Cooking Vinyl
- Members: Ben Byrne; James Stelfox; James Walsh; Barry Westhead
- Website: www.starsailor.band

Starsailor are an English post-Britpop band, formed in 2000. Since their formation, the band have included guitarist and vocalist James Walsh, drummer Ben Byrne, bassist James Stelfox, and keyboardist Barry Westhead. They are best known for their 2003 single "Silence Is Easy", which reached number 9 in the UK, and "Four to the Floor", which reached number one in France as well as the top five in Australia.

The band have released six studio albums and scored ten Top 40 hit singles in the UK. Their first album Love Is Here was released in 2001, followed by Silence Is Easy (2003) and On the Outside (2005). After the release of its fourth album All the Plans (2009), the band entered into extended hiatus until 2014, during which its members were involved in individual projects.

Starsailor announced their reunion on 23 May 2014 and began performing worldwide. Good Souls: The Greatest Hits was released in September 2015 and featured two new songs. A fifth studio album All This Life was released in 2017, followed by Where The Wild Things Grow in 2024.

== History ==
=== Formation, signed by EMI (1999–2000) ===
Bassist James Stelfox and drummer Ben Byrne had been playing together in Warrington, Cheshire for a number of years. The band members met whilst studying a music course at Wigan and Leigh College. When their regular singer fell ill, they recruited young Chorley singer and songwriter James Walsh from a school choir.

The band, then named Waterface, had tried a number of guitarists before they asked long-time friend Barry Westhead to join the band in 2000 on keyboards. He had been teaching judo and playing organ for a church near his home town. His arrival has been heralded as the most significant event in the band's formation. Walsh also took up the guitar, following frustration over not finding a musician right for the group. The band started to build up a reputation, and their name changed to Starsailor after the 1970 album Starsailor by Tim Buckley.

A journalist from NME saw a gig in 2000 and gave the band a glowing review. "One live encounter was enough to convince many sceptics that here was a band who were genuinely special, blessed with a singer whose voice thrummed like an emotional telegraph wire, that swerved the pitfalls of indie melancholia and were clearly in love with rock 'n' roll and all its possibilities." Their performance at the Glastonbury Festival added to the band's reputation and led to a bidding war amongst UK record companies.

A relative of one band member worked for EMI, and the label then signed them in 2000. In 2008, in a re-organisation, Starsailor were moved to Virgin Records, a division of EMI.

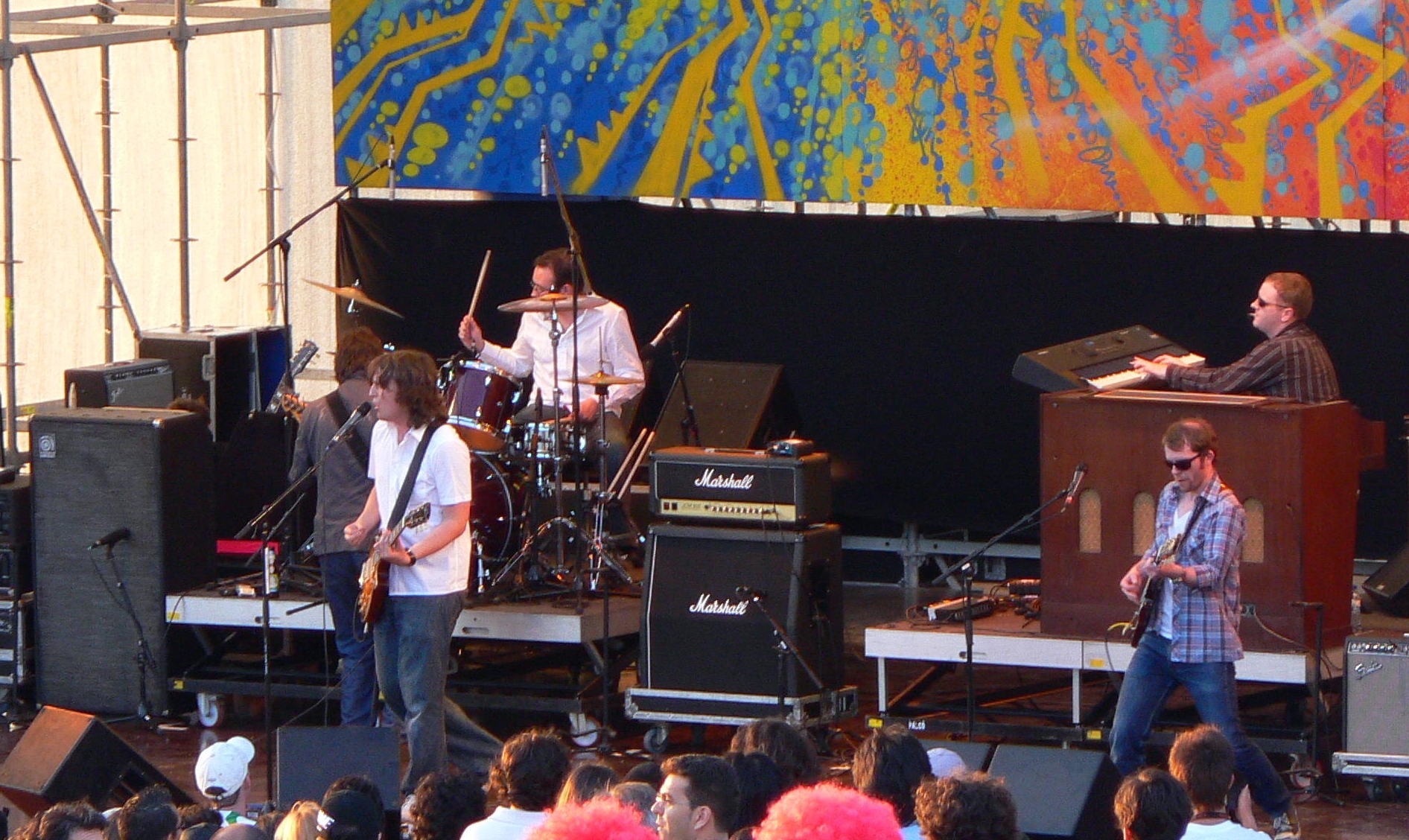
In concert Rock in Rio Lisbon 2006

=== Love Is Here, critical acclaim (2000–2002) ===
"Fever", the band's first single, was released in early 2001. The song, and its two B-Sides "Love Is Here" and "Coming Down" were cut from a demo recording session in mid-2000. All three tracks went on to feature on Starsailor's first album Love Is Here, but were re-recorded.

In March 2001 the band sold out its first UK Tour, which consisted of eleven dates in England. Their second single, "Good Souls", was released in April and featured a cover of Van Morrison's "The Way Young Lovers Do" as a B-Side. During this period, the band were recording their debut album in Rockfield Studios, Wales. By this time, the band were already previewing many of the album's tracks in their concerts, most notably "Poor Misguided Fool", "Lullaby" and "Way To Fall", which would appear as the ending theme of the video game Metal Gear Solid 3: Snake Eater in 2004. An acoustic version of "Alcoholic" appeared on a promotional CD for NME magazine earlier in 2001. The original release date for the album was August 2001.

Further live dates came supporting the Manic Street Preachers in Glasgow, as well as Doves on their North American tour. The band also marked their first festival appearances, playing at events such as V Festival and Germany's Rock im Park. "Alcoholic" appeared as the third single to be taken off their debut album, and its number ten chart position remains the band's second highest placing to date. The single version was actually an extended version of the album track.

Their album Love Is Here reached number 2 in the UK album charts in October 2001, after receiving great critical acclaim. Combining a mix of acoustic guitar and Walsh's vocals, critics said the songs leave the "hairs on the back of your neck standing."

The year ended with the band winning the "Brightest New Hope" award at the NME Awards, and the release of their fourth single, "Lullaby", which reached number thirty-six. Some fans complained about the difficulty in obtaining copies of the single.

Peter Kay joined the band on stage at their 2002 Christmas Concert held in Warrington's Parr Hall.

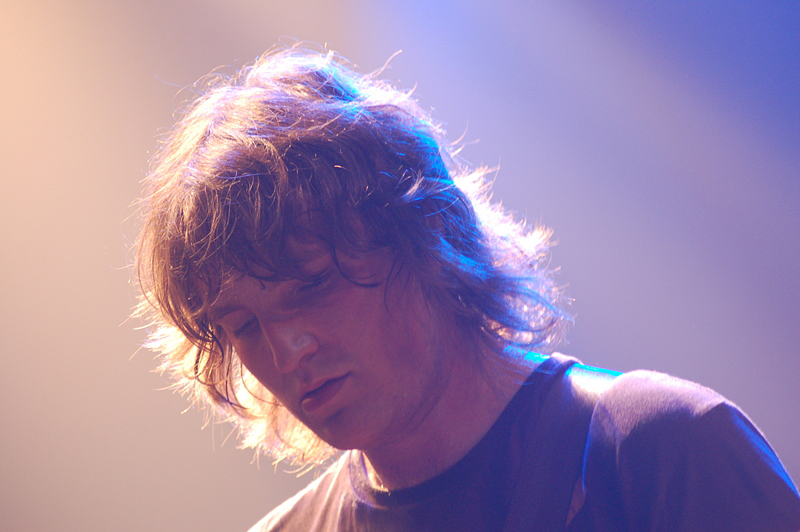
James Walsh

=== Silence Is Easy (2002–2005) ===
For their second album, Silence Is Easy, which was recorded in Los Angeles, Starsailor teamed up with Phil Spector (in what ended up being his final production work before his conviction of murder in 2009 and his death in 2021). The collaboration came about following Spector's daughter Nicole attending one of the band's American concerts in the winter of 2002. Spector was reported to have been fascinated by "Lullaby", the band's fourth single. After meeting the producer, the band agreed to work with him on their second album. However, the collaboration was short-lived; sessions at London's Abbey Road proved difficult. Spector is said to have proved difficult to work with. Only two tracks made the band's second album: the title track, "Silence Is Easy", and "White Dove".

The band co-produced seven of the other tracks with Danton Supple and former Stone Roses and Radiohead producer John Leckie was brought in to oversee the recording of "Shark Food".

The first single was "Silence Is Easy", which made the Top Ten (No. 9, the band's highest placing). The album spawned just three singles; the second of which, "Born Again" had evolved from a B-side to "Poor Misguided Fool", released in early 2002. The song was re-recorded for the album, and cut down for a radio edit. "Four to the Floor", which was remixed by Thin White Duke, became a popular club hit. Walsh wanted the track to become the band's "I Am the Resurrection", something to be played in "indie discos everywhere".

The album charted well, but sales were sluggish in comparison to the band's first album. The release dropped out of the Top 40 soon thereafter.

A full UK tour began in autumn 2003 shortly after the release of the album, culminating at London's Brixton Academy. The show featured the only performance before their American tour in 2006 of "Restless Heart", the closing track on the Silence Is Easy album. Mark Collins, from The Charlatans joined Starsailor for all dates between August 2003 to December 2004, playing additional and lead guitar.

=== On the Outside, return to form (2005–2007) ===
EMI allowed the band plenty of time to record their follow-up album; having targeted producer Rob Schnapf to produce it, the group relocated to Los Angeles to record. Five possible titles appeared; ("Faith, Hope, Love"/"Here I Go"/"Ashes" or "In the Crossfire"/"I Do Not Know"/"Counterfeit Life"), but the band settled for On the Outside, a statement of their position in the music industry. The sound was different from the previous two releases; it was far heavier than its predecessors. Starsailor had always received praise for their live sound, but the releases seemed "puny" in comparison, admitted Stelfox. The recording was all done to tape, and the band did not use editing software such as Pro Tools to "perfect" the recording. Byrne later remarked that his drum track on "White Light" took a long time to nail; highlighting the band's desire to make the record they were truly happy with.

Starsailor released their third album, On the Outside, in the UK on 17 October 2005 from which the first single from the album, "In the Crossfire" was taken. It was released by Artists Addiction Records in the USA on 22 August. Critics raved about the release, with many citing it as a return to form. Despite this, promotional appearances including a short live set and signing at London's HMV Oxford Street did not aid sales – the album charted at number 13.

Since September 2005, Richard Warren joined the band when playing live, aiding Walsh with additional guitar, vocals and also harmonica parts. Again, the band's UK tour ended at Brixton Academy. Following that, the band toured Europe, playing several dates in France, where "Four to the Floor" was a number one hit in 2004. Following the Paris concert on 3 April, Walsh and Warren were the DJ's at the after-show party.

The album has spawned three singles; "This Time" and "Keep Us Together" followed "In The Crossfire". Despite promoting the single with appearances in London and Leeds, "Keep Us Together" was the first single not to reach the UK Top 40. The promotional video for "This Time" appears to be a cultural reference to the film Run Lola Run, but may not be intentional.

Starsailor played numerous festivals in the summer of 2006; most notably Hyde Park Calling on 1 July 2006, alongside Roger Waters, and the V Festival, held in Stafford and Chelmsford. They also supported the Rolling Stones on their Bigger Bang Tour, replacing Amy Winehouse in Munich and Hamburg in 2006. Front man James Walsh told BBC 6 Music: "We heard on Sunday evening, our agent gave us a frantic call, and asked what we were doing this week, fortunately we had a week off!"

In the autumn of 2006, Starsailor toured North America, playing both headlining shows and supporting James Blunt. In January 2007, they undertook their first trip to Russia, playing at the B2 Club in Moscow. According to the band's official website, Barry Westhead's partner Kelly gave birth to a baby boy on 12 April 2007. The baby was named Joseph. Bass player James Stelfox became a father again in 2008, when his partner gave birth to a girl, named Ella, in November while the rest of the band were doing their first trip to Korea.

=== All the Plans, beginning of hiatus (2007–2009) ===
In 2007, Starsailor began recording demos for the follow-up to 2005's On the Outside.

Starsailor started to play in various gigs during the months recording their fourth album. James Walsh also played at several events in 2007, like the South by Southwest] festival in Austin, Texas in March 2007, and an acoustic show in London on 12 March. The show is notable for not having a set list; rarities such as the hardly played "Restless Heart" was played, due to a request from the front row. In addition to this he played the song "Tell Me It's Not Over", the track from the work-in-progress fourth album (early arrivals saw Walsh sound check half the song).

Walsh and Stelfox played an unplugged set on 13 April 2007 in Switzerland with Mark Collins of the Charlatans.

Starsailor opened again for the Rolling Stones in Frankfurt, Paris, Lyon and Hamburg between June and August 2007; these were late additions, and fitted in the band's festival schedule. The previous concert before the Stones' support was in The Hague; the band debuted the first full-band version of "Tell Me It's Not Over". Starsailor had embarked on a tour of the UK during October 2007 in support of Fairtrade. They have debuted a number of new songs during the tour as "Boy in Waiting" and "All the Plans". The lyrics for "Tell Me It's Not Over" had changed considerably since the first time they had sung it. Their first travel to Latin America was confirmed after a long period of speculation. Starsailor supported The Killers in November 2007 on their dates in Argentina and Chile. Starsailor played in June at the Isle of Wight Festival on the last day, with the Police headlining on that date. They also performed at Hard Rock Calling in Hyde Park the same month with the Police as headliners. They also confirmed that they would play at Rockin' Park in the Netherlands on 28 June, on the third day of the 2008 Cactus Festival at Minnewaterpark in Bruges, Belgium on 12 July, and the Open Air Gampel Festival in Switzerland on 16 August.

On 20 March 2008, front man James posted on the official Starsailor forum announcing the album had been completed.

On 16 October 2008 it was officially confirmed that the new album would be called All the Plans and was to be released in March 2009. On 3 December, the Boy in Waiting EP was released as a free digital download for those who pre-order the deluxe edition of All the Plans. It contained three tracks that did not make the album.

The album debuted at Number 26 in the UK Album Charts on 14 March 2009, while "Tell Me It's Not Over" spent one week in the UK Singles Chart, reaching No. 73, and peaking at No. 5 in the Belgian Charts, becoming Starsailor's most successful single in that country.

On 26 April 2009, the band performed at The Tavern pub in Wigan, as part of Channel 4 television's "Grassroot Gigs" series. They had never played a concert in the town before, and have played there only once since then.

Walsh began to work on a solo project at the end of 2009. On 13 November 2009 it was officially announced by the Lancashire Evening Post that Starsailor was on hiatus and that James Walsh was concentrating on his solo career.

=== Reunion, touring and Greatest Hits album (2014–2015) ===
Starsailor reformed in 2014, playing support slots at the Summer in the City festival on 10 and 11 July at the Castlefield Bowl in Manchester, headlined by the Pixies and James. They performed at Rock Zottegem festival in Belgium on 14 July 2014. On 3 August 2014, the band performed at the Pentaport Rock Festival held in Incheon, South Korea. Their support tour continued in November 2014, supporting them in England at venues like Parr Hall, National Indoor Arena and Royal Albert Hall. They returned to the stage in June 2015, when they co-headlined several concerts with Embrace in the USA.

Starsailor's first greatest hits album, called Good Souls: The Greatest Hits, was released on 18 September 2015. The album contained 19 tracks, including all of band's singles to date and two brand new songs "Give Up the Ghost" and "Hold on", recorded with producer Harry Rutherford.

Starsailor played a second gig in Wigan in 2016, supported by a local band who shared the same management agency.

=== All This Life (2017–present) ===
In 2017, the band released "Listen To Your Heart", their first release in almost two years. Their fifth album, All This Life, was released on 1 September 2017 through the band's new record label, Cooking Vinyl. Flick of the Finger gave the album an overwhelmingly positive 5 star review, with the publication praising the song "Sunday Best", saying that 'the album is best summarised by this one melancholic and emotional track.' The album entered the UK album chart at No. 23.

In December 2021, the band were to release an expanded 20th anniversary edition of their album Love Is Here, as well as going out on tour to support it. The release was delayed until January 2022 due to pressing delays of the vinyl edition. Due to a partial cancelation due to the COVID-19 pandemic, the band were eventually able to complete their delayed tour in September 2022, and gave a live debut to a new song recorded earlier in the year entitled "Heavyweight".

October 2023 saw the band announce details of their sixth studio album, entitled Where The Wild Things Grow, with a release date of March 2024. A video for the title track was also released at the same time. In November 2023, Starsailor released a 20th anniversary of their album Silence Is Easy alongside a tour to promote the re-issue. Where The Wild Things Grow was released on 22 March 2024, charting at No. 25.

== Charity ==
The band played the London Astoria on 4 and 8 February 2002. The first date was a concert in aid of Warchild, and also included Travis and Ryan Adams on the bill. The 8th saw the debut of "Born Again", which would eventually be released as a single. The concert is notable since the band were joined on stage by two backing singers and a cellist. James Walsh told NME.COM after the show that he thought the gig was "amazing, something really special" while bassist James Stelfox said it was "one of the greatest ever." This flirtation with these additional voices and a cello only lasted a brief period of time.

On 19 September 2008, Starsailor performed in the second edition of the "Stars of Europe" concert at Brussels in support of UNICEF, where they covered U2's single "All I Want Is You".

On 20 May 2009, the band was named Hard Rock's "Philanthropic Artist of the Year" in recognition of the work they'd done in support of the Caron Keating Foundation, the AECC of Barcelona and Nordoff-Robbins Music Therapy, as well as having contributed an exclusive cover of Graham Nash's "Military Madness" to the World Hunger Year Serve3 charity album.

== Band members ==
Current members

- James Walsh – guitar and lead vocals
- James Stelfox – bass
- Barry Westhead – keyboards
- Ben Byrne – drums

Session and touring members

- Mark Collins – guitar and vocals (2003–2004, 2006, 2014)
- Richard "Echoboy" Warren – guitar, vocals and harmonica (2005–2006)
- Pete Greenwood – guitar (2008–2009)
- Tony Foster – guitar (2024–present)

== Discography ==
Studio albums

- Love Is Here (2001)
- Silence Is Easy (2003)
- On the Outside (2005)
- All the Plans (2009)
- All This Life (2017)
- Where the Wild Things Grow (2024)
