= James Stelfox =

James "Stel" Stelfox
- James Stelfox playing at the Isle of Wight Festival in 2008

Background information
- Born: James Paul Stelfox; 23 March 1976 (age 50); Warrington, England
- Genres: Alternative rock
- Occupations: Bassist, record producer
- Instrument: Bass guitar
- Years active: 2001–present
- Member of: Starsailor

James Paul Stelfox (born 23 March 1976 in Warrington, England) is an English musician, best known as the bassist for Starsailor.

== Biography ==
Stelfox first met Ben Byrne ten years prior to Starsailor forming. They became friends since junior school and they went to Leigh Campus of Wigan and Leigh College, where they finally met Barry Westhead and James Walsh.

Stelfox and Byrne started playing in the north west of England for a number of years. After their singer fell ill, James Walsh decided to join them (before, he was on a school choir).

Stelfox is musically influenced by Neil Young, Paul McCartney and Massive Attack.

== See also ==
- Kai Stephens
