= James Walsh (musician) =

English singer-songwriter (born 1980)

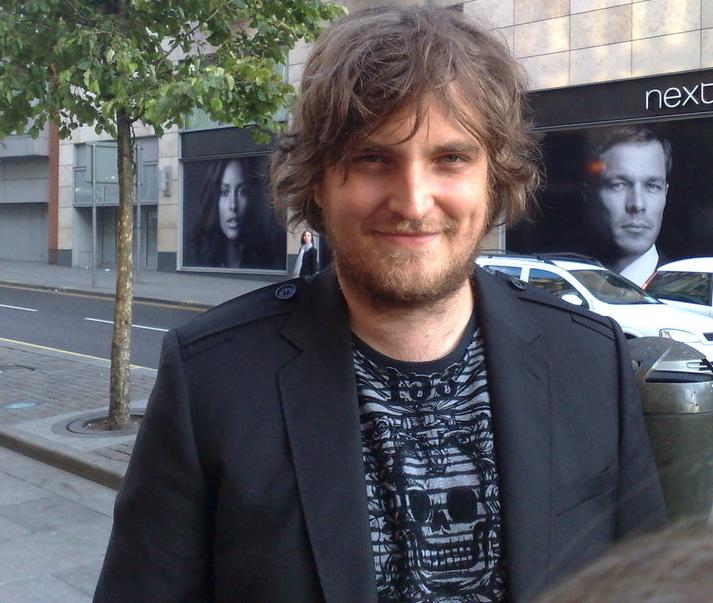
- James Walsh in 2008

Background information
- Born: James Milne Walsh; 10 June 1980 (age 46); Wigan, England, United Kingdom
- Genre: Rock
- Occupations: Vocalist, guitarist, musician, actor, songwriter
- Instruments: Vocals, guitar, piano,
- Labels: Smith And Songs, Solo Records
- Member of: Starsailor
- Website: Jameswalshmusic.com

James Milne Walsh (born 10 June 1980) is an English singer, songwriter, guitarist, pianist and frontman of the band Starsailor. Walsh released his first solo studio album, Lullaby, in 2012. He released his fourth and fifth albums, both in 2021. Including his work with Starsailor, he has sold over three million albums globally.

== Biography ==
Born in Wigan, Walsh grew up in Chorley where he attended St Michael's CE School. He started playing the piano at the age of 12, and by the time he was 14 he wrote his own songs; he enjoyed listening to artists like the Charlatans, Oasis, and Jeff Buckley. A shy and lonely personality, he looked for artists that had, or have, an influence on the musicians of his generation.

Eventually he was attracted to artists and bands such as Neil Young, Bob Dylan, Nick Drake, and the Beatles. In a 2009 online Q&A, he named the Beatles' Revolver as his "greatest album, ever". He added: "You could pick any album [by the Beatles], really. Anyone who thinks they are not the best band ever is just being contrary." Walsh was so impressed by the music of Tim Buckley that he decided to name his own band after the title of Buckley's 1970 album Starsailor. He met fellow band members, James Stelfox and Ben Byrne, when he studied music at the Leigh campus of Wigan and Leigh College in Wigan.

Starsailor members Ben Byrne and James Stelfox had played together in bands in Warrington. One day, when their vocalist did not turn up, Walsh asked them if he could sit in with them and sing for this rehearsal. This was the first incarnation of Starsailor as a band. Walsh decided to play the guitars for the band after the "frustration over not finding a musician right for the group".

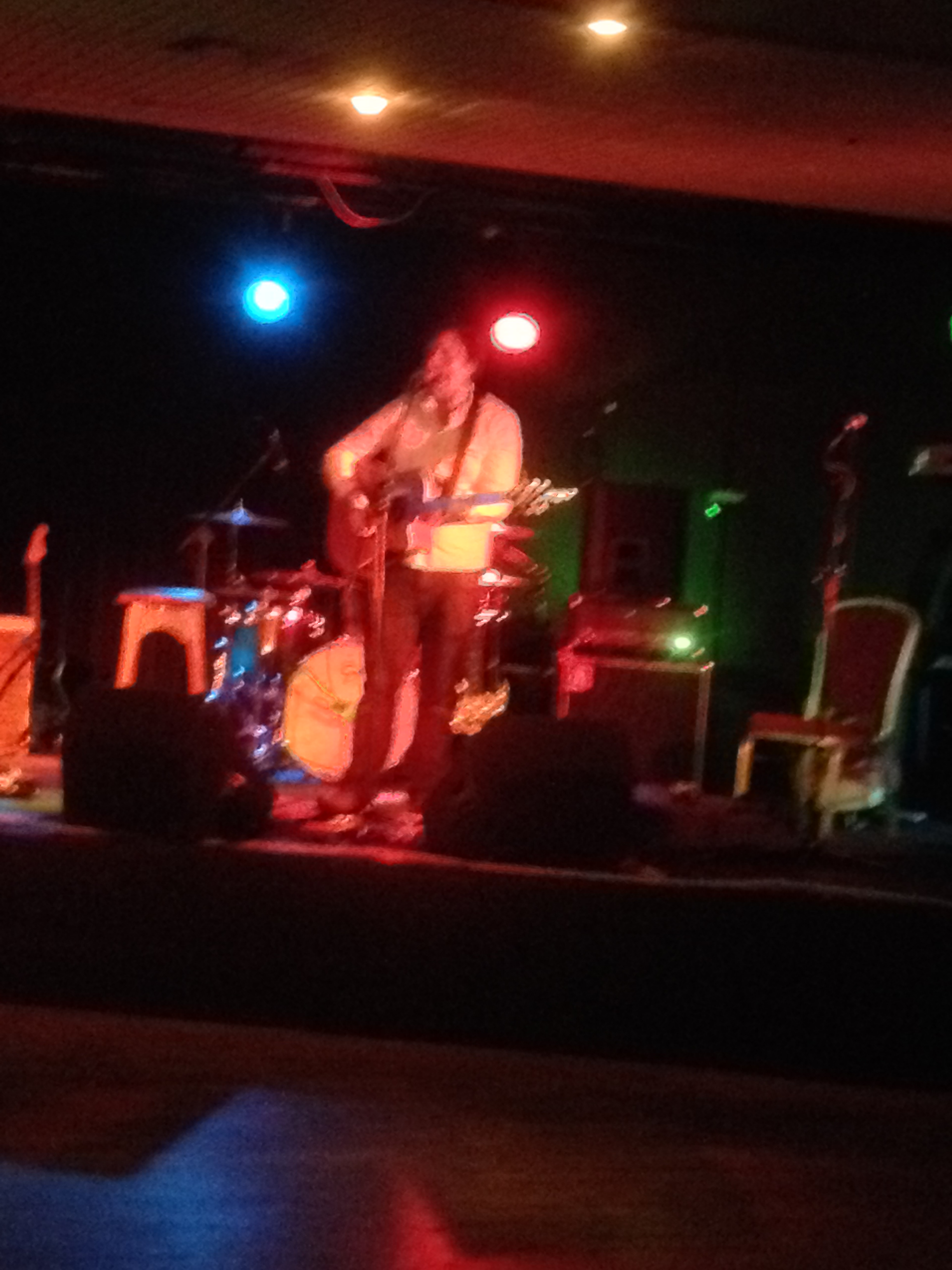
James Walsh performing in a pub in Sallynoggin, Co. Dublin. October 2013.

In 2009, he started recording his first solo album, working with American songwriter and singer Suzanne Vega. His first solo EP, Live at the Top of the World was recorded in Tromsø with a chamber orchestra from Norway, and was released in November 2010. He has also contributed to a mini-album Robotic Heart Foundation by Nikolaj Torp Larsson and Andreas Olson, after he met them at a studio when working on a film.

In 2010 Walsh has worked together with Belgian band Andes on the song "één dag meer" ("One More Day").

During June 2011, Walsh supported Simple Minds on their "Greatest Hits Forest Tour".

Walsh's debut album, Lullaby, was released on 17 September 2012.

In April 2015, Walsh supported Mike and the Mechanics on their "The Hits" tour.

== Personal life ==
He is a supporter of Liverpool Football Club and used to play concerts for the other supporters and leave comments about the development of the team on his Myspace and Twitter. In 2009, he listed his most inspirational individuals as Fabrizio Moretti, Nick Valensi, Daniel Kessler, Stath, Beyoncé, Nadine Coyle, former Liverpool manager Bill Shankly, ex-Beatle George Harrison, and John F. Kennedy.

Walsh has two children with Lisa McNamee; a daughter (born 9 August 2002) and a son, Cillian,(born 30 June 2008).

== Filmography ==
| Year | Title | Role | Notes |
|---|---|---|---|
| 2010 | Powder | Keva McLuskey | James Walsh puts his voice on the songs for the role lead singer of a fictional band called The Grams |

== Discography ==
=== Albums/EPs ===
- Live at the Top of the World EP (2010)
- Lullaby (2012)
- Time Is Nigh (EP) (January 6, 2013)
- Turning Point (April 6, 2014)
- Acoustic Singer Songwriter (July 24, 2017) [James Walsh, Greg Hatwell]
- Love & Heartbreak (April 1, 2019) [James Walsh, Greg Hatwell]
- Tiger On The Bridge (May 31, 2019)
- The Quiet Ones (EP) (September 20, 2019)
- The Places Where Our Love Began (EP) (August 21, 2020)
- Small Illusions (February 12, 2021)
- Everything Will Be Ok (September 17, 2021)
- People Like Us (EP) (January 14, 2022)
- Solitude Days (EP) (January 21, 2022)
- Coming Good (January 20, 2023)
- Indie Songwriter (November 8, 2023) [James Walsh, Greg Hatwell]
- It's All Happening (January 30, 2026)

=== Singles ===
- "Start Again" (2012)
- "This Town" (2012)
- "Love Will Never Let You Down" (2014) (Eddie Thoneick and Abel Ramos featuring James Walsh)
- "Better Part Of Me" (2014)
- "We Could Try" (2014)
- "Heavy Heart" (2019)
- "Germaine" (2019)
- "Dream to Weave" (2019)
- "Until You Find Someone" (2019)
- "Sirens Call" (2020)
- "Astral Plains" (2020)
- "Weightless" (2020)
- "Caledonia" (2020)
- "It's Christmas" (2020)
