= Winter Hill =

Winter Hill may refer to:

== Places ==
- Winter Hill (North West England), a hill on the border between Greater Manchester and Lancashire, England
  - Winter Hill transmitting station, a broadcasting and telecommunications site on the hill
  - Winter Hill (air disaster), a plane crash at Winter Hill
- Winter Hill, Somerville, Massachusetts, U.S.
- Winter Hill, a district of Cookham, Berkshire
- Winterhill, a district of Milton Keynes, England

== Other uses ==
- "Winter Hill" (song) by Doves, and the second single from their 2009 album Kingdom of Rust
- Winter Hill Gang, a crime gang based in Boston, US, in the late 20th century
- Winterhill School, a comprehensive school situated in Kimberworth, South Yorkshire, England
