= Some Cities Live =

EP by Doves
- Released: 17 April 2006
- Recorded: 2005
- Genre: Indie rock
- Length: 23:49
- Label: Heavenly Records/EMI
- Producer: Doves

Doves chronology
Sky Starts Falling (2005)	Some Cities Live (2006)	Kingdom of Rust (2009)

Some Cities Live is the first digital download-only release from Doves. It was made available worldwide in April 2006. Each song was recorded at a different venue throughout the band's December 2005 UK tour dates, except for "Where We're Calling From"/"Pounding," which was recorded in New York in September 2005.

== Track listing ==
All tracks are written by Jez Williams, Jimi Goodwin, and Andy Williams

No.	Title	Length
1.	"Black and White Town" (Live at The Music Factory, Carlow, 20 December 2005)	4:44
2.	"Almost Forgot Myself" (Live at O2 Academy Newcastle, Newcastle upon Tyne, 11 December 2005)	4:40
3.	"Snowden" (Live at the Hammersmith Apollo, London, 7 December 2005)	4:30
4.	"Ambition" (Live at Olympia Theatre, Dublin, 21 December 2005)	3:59
5.	"Where We're Calling From"/"Pounding" (Live at the Warsaw, Brooklyn, New York, 14 September 2005)	6:35
