= Where You Go I Go Too =

Studio album by Lindstrøm
- Released: 18 August 2008
- Genre: Space disco
- Length: 55:06
- Label: Smalltown Supersound
- Producer: Lindstrøm

Lindstrøm chronology
It's a Feedelity Affair (2006)	Where You Go I Go Too (2008)	Real Life Is No Cool (2010)

Where You Go I Go Too is the first studio album by Norwegian electronica artist Hans-Peter Lindstrøm. It was first released in the United Kingdom on 18 August 2008 and was subsequently released the next day in the United States. The album comprises three tracks, roughly 30, 10, and 15 minutes in length. Where You Go I Go Too is usually labeled "space disco" due to its "spacey, psychedelic" feel and four-to-the-floor beats.

Production of the album followed the 2006 release of It's a Feedelity Affair, a compilation of singles. Lindstrøm had become dissatisfied with simply producing remixes and average length songs, which led to experimentation with lengthy tracks. The album received positive reviews from critics, who praised its slick production values and epic scope. At the 2009 Spellemannprisen award ceremony in Norway, the record won the award for "best electronica album".

== Background and production ==
Following the release of It's a Feedelity Affair in 2006, Lindstrøm had become tired of producing dance remixes and average length vocal pieces. He began giving the artists and labels mixes with slower tempos. Lindstrøm also felt he was unwisely incorporating musical ideas into remixes instead of original works, which led to experiments with lengthier tracks for an original album. Four to five tracks were originally envisioned for Where You Go I Go Too, but only three were chosen.

The title track was a time-consuming project; Lindstrøm called it a "nightmare to finish." The song comprised over 70 layers of sound and spanned almost 30 minutes. Around half the sound consisted of live performances, which Lindstrøm found difficult to merge with the electronic portions. After changing the music, he would usually listen to the entire song and evaluate the change. The repeated listens took a toll: "I needed to listen to 30 minutes of music every time I did something," said Lindstrom "So I'll never gonna [sic] do it again." Despite this, he enjoyed working with extended songs because it allowed them to evolve and move at a slow pace.

The album mixing was delayed during spring 2008. Typically, Lindstrøm would mix the record himself, but he felt overwhelmed by the album's scope and decided to seek outside help: "I’ve kind of discovered that I’m not good at doing everything myself. The problem with involving other people is that sometimes all the progress gets slowed down, but as long as the results are good, I’m happy... Leave the post-production to somebody else."

Though a common theme was not purposefully established for the album, some journalists noted similar feelings of travel and adventure when listening to the record. Lindstrøm has recommended people listen while traveling, and believes his travels may have influenced the album: "I don't particularly like traveling, but I've realised that it's perfect for listening to whole albums... I'm sure the way I'm listening to music now ... has something to do with the music I'm writing." The song titles were left "open" so "the listener could make up his own story."

Where You Go I Go Too was released by Smalltown Supersound on 18 August 2008 in the United Kingdom, and 19 August in the United States. A special edition was issued on 23 December 2008. The album featured a bonus disc with edited versions of the original tracks by frequent Lindstrøm collaborator Prins Thomas. Lindstrøm toured in Austria, Germany, Spain, and the United States that fall.

== Musical style and influences ==
"Where You Go I Go Too"
Lindstrøm enjoyed the freedom that lengthier tracks allowed. In the title track, the drums do not enter until six minutes into the track.

Where You Go I Go Too comprises three tracks, roughly 30, 10, and 15 minutes in duration, which seamlessly flow into each other in transitions that were described as "gradual and subtle". The songs grow and develop independent musical traits, such as motifs, polyrhythms, and melodies. According to The Guardian, some musical changes are pronounced, such as the introduction of a synthesizer, while others, such as small tempo changes, remain "almost insensible". Some critics have noted the album conjures the feeling of a journey.

The music is a collage of electronic music, characterized by synthesized melodies, layered sounds, live performances, and four-to-the-floor beats. Pitchfork editor Dominique Leone described it as a "seamless combination of digital production, analog synthesizers and live instrumentation." Lindstrøm has been heavily influenced by music from the 1970s and 1980s, particularly disco progenitors Jean-Marc Cerrone and Giorgio Moroder. Where You Go I Go Too is often classified as "space disco" due to these influences and because it possesses a "spacey, psychedelic" sound. Lindstrøm listened to the Beach Boys, the Eagles, and Kirsty MacColl while writing the album.

== Reception ==
Professional ratings
Aggregate scores
Source	Rating
Metacritic	82/100
Review scores
Source	Rating
AllMusic	4/5 stars
The A.V. Club	B−
The Boston Phoenix	3.5/4 stars
The Guardian	4/5 stars
Now	4/5
Pitchfork	8.6/10
PopMatters	7/10
Spin	4/5 stars
Uncut	4/5 stars
URB	3.5/5 stars

Where You Go I Go Too debuted at No. 11 on the Norwegian music chart. The following week it fell to No. 27 before leaving the list. The record did not chart internationally. In 2009, Where You Go I Go Too received a Spellemannprisen award for "best electronica album". The album was well received by critics and received an 82 out of 100 on the aggregate website Metacritic, which signifies "universal acclaim".

AllMusic writer K. Ross Hoffman declared the record an "entirely satisfying display" of Lindstrøm's talents and positively commented on the textured instrumentation. Hoffman concluded the music was an "expansive, exploratory journey" worth experiencing. Andy Battaglia of The A.V. Club disagreed, believing the album to be narrow minded and a missed opportunity to exploit the lengthy tracks and deliver more musical depth. Praise was given by Alex Macpherson of The Guardian, who stated "Every aspect of the record seems tailor-made to produce maximum pleasure [...] Where You Go I Go Too would make even the most hellish of journeys seem like a first-class trip."

Jim Brackpool of Yahoo! Music felt audience reactions would be polarized; some would find it "sophisticated and lovingly crafted", while others might be put off by its "unabashed opulence". No Ripcord writer Sam Draper christened the record "one of the finest pieces of music [he had] heard in years." Pitchfork editor Tim Finney believed Where You Go I Go Too showed signs of a masterpiece, but also possessed "bloat, excess, and splendor" reminiscent of disco revivalists. Pitchfork named it one of the best albums of 2008.

The album's title track was received favorably. Draper displayed particular fondness for the song and was amazed the music could stay fresh for its entire length. Hoffman also spoke highly of it, stating "[It] contains only as many discernible musical ideas as your average five- to seven-minute techno track [...] but its luxurious length lets those ideas stretch out gloriously [...] allowing a slow, fluid evolution that gestures towards a cosmic infinity." Finney praised the title track for its "shimmering, strobing synthesizer melodies" and ability to expand and surprise. A favorable comparison to Kraftwerk's similarly lengthy song "Autobahn" was made by Jason Newman of URB.

Reviews of the other two tracks were generally positive. Brackpool wrote favorably about "Grand Ideas" and made comparisons to Vangelis and Tangerine Dream, while Hoffman named it the most danceable track on the album. Though Battaglia felt the song kept repeating the same chord progression, he believed the "accents and shifts in pitch" strengthened it. Jeff Rovinelli writing for Tiny Mix Tapes thought "The Long Way Home" sounded silly. Brackpool agreed, writing "[If] isolated from the rest of the album [The Long Way Home] could easily pass for generic library music..." While Draper considered it a solid song, he decided it was a "little too saccharine for its own good". Hoffman enjoyed the song and wrote "the vibe is rangy and exultant [...] as blissful and bemused as the vehemently unpretentious [cover] shot of Lindstrøm."

== Track listing ==
All songs written by Hans-Peter Lindstrøm except where noted.

Original release

1. "Where You Go I Go Too" – 28:58
2. "Grand Ideas" – 10:10
3. "The Long Way Home" – 15:58

iTunes bonus song (also available on Spotify)

1. "Grand Ideas (Johan Agebjörn Remix)" – 6:49

Special edition

1. "Where You Go I Go Too" – 28:58
2. "Grand Ideas" – 10:10
3. "The Long Way Home" – 15:58
4. "Where You Go I Go Too Pt. 1" (Prins Thomas Edit) – 13:05
5. "Where You Go I Go Too Pt. 2" (Prins Thomas Edit) – 8:37
6. "Grand Ideas" (Prins Thomas Radio Edit) – 5:14
7. "The Long Way Home" (Prins Thomas Edit) – 12:32

== Personnel ==
- Hans-Peter Lindstrøm – writing, producing, performing, mixing
- Knut Sævik – mixing
- Chris Sansom – mastering
- Kim Hiorthøy – photography

== Charts ==
Chart (2008)	Peak
Norway	11
