= Wintershall (disambiguation) =

Wintershall was a German gas and oil producer until 2019.

Wintershall may also refer to:

- Wintershall Dea, the successor of Wintershall after a 2019 merger with DEA
- Wintershall, Surrey, an English country estate, site of outdoor biblical drama productions
- William Wintershall (died 1679), English actor

== See also ==
- Wintershill, hamlet in Hampshire, England
- Winter Hill (disambiguation)
- Winter Hall (1872–1947), New Zealand-born silent film actor
- Winterfell, location in A Song of Ice and Fire and Game of Thrones fantasy series
