= Belmont, Lancashire =

Village in Lancashire, England

Coordinates: 53.640°N 2.495°W

Belmont
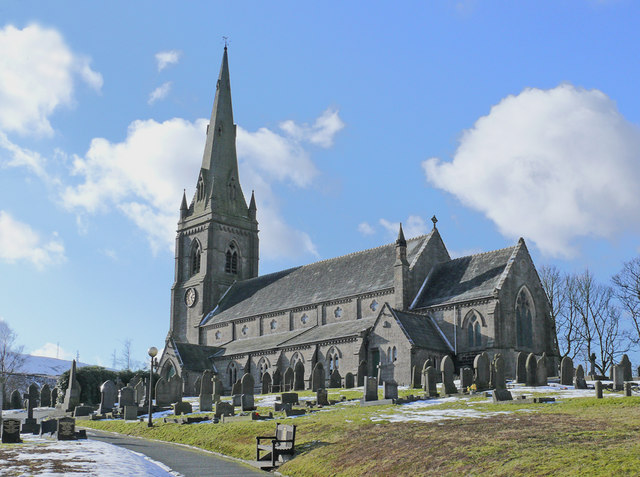
- St Peter's church

- Shown within Blackburn with Darwen Location within Lancashire
- OS grid reference: SD673161
- Civil parish: North Turton
- Unitary authority: Blackburn with Darwen
- Ceremonial county: Lancashire
- Region: North West
- Country: England
- Sovereign state: United Kingdom
- Post town: BOLTON
- Postcode district: BL7
- Dialling code: 01204
- Police: Lancashire
- Fire: Lancashire
- Ambulance: North West
- UK Parliament: Rossendale and Darwen

Belmont is a village and former civil parish, now in the parish of North Turton, in the unitary authority area of Blackburn with Darwen, in the ceremonial county of Lancashire, England. It is close to Darwen and has around 500 inhabitants.

== History ==
Archaeological finds at or near Belmont have been Mesolithic material and a flint blade, Flint Microlith Core and Flint Scraper. Finds have included Neolithic Barbed and tanged arrowheads. Items found from the Bronze Age include a spearhead with Bronze Age Round cairns on Noon Hill and Winter Hill.

Before 1804 Belmont was known as Hordern and was part of the upper part of the township of Sharples in the parish of Bolton le Moors. The township contained cotton mills, a large dye works owned by Thomas Rycroft that had a landmark chimney (which has been demolished), and a print works; there was a paper works at Spring Side in Folds.

Following a factory fire several years ago a housing estate was developed with houses designed to look traditional.

The neo-Gothic parish church of St Peter's designed by John Edgar Gregan, built at the end of 1849 was consecrated on 1 April 1850. One of Gregan's last projects, the church was constructed from local stone on the site of an ancient farm. John Hick, a local industrialist and later MP for Bolton, was very involved with the church and responsible for the installation of several stained glass windows, the church bells and turret clock.

=== Civil parish ===
Belmont was formerly a chapelry in the parish of Bolton-le-Moors, from 1894 Belmont was a civil parish in its own right, on 1 April 1925 the parish was abolished and merged with Turton. In 1921 the parish had a population of 635.

== Governance ==
Belmont is in the borough of Blackburn with Darwen.

Tockholes is part of the Rossendale and Darwen constituency. Andy MacNae has been the Member of Parliament for Rossendale and Darwen since 2024. Jake Berry was previous the MP for this constituency.

== Geography ==
Belmont is a linear settlement in moorland in the West Pennine Moors, built along the old Bolton to Preston road, the A675. It lies about 5 miles (8 km) northwest of Bolton in a valley between Anglezarke Moor and Turton Moor. There is a minor road to Rivington to the west.

The Winter Hill transmitting station stands on Winter Hill about one-third of a mile (0.54 km) southwest of the village.

Belmont Reservoir, built by Bolton Waterworks in the 19th century, occupies the valley to the north of the village, and is home to Bolton Sailing Club. The smaller Ward's Reservoir, built in the early 19th century to supply water to the former Rycroft Dye Works and known locally as the Blue Lagoon, was drained in 2010.

== Economy ==
The village has one public house, and a restaurant/bar. It also has around 20 business located in the old bleach works including various forms of engineering, decorative glass, architectural iron works, vehicle restoration workshops, landscaping, specialist coatings, motorbike engineers and bathroom retailers.

== Education ==
Primary education is provided by Belmont Primary School.

== Religion ==
St Peter's Church Belmont is a Church of England parish church serving the local community of Belmont Village, including a Sunday school.

== See also ==
- James Slade
