= Some Cities =

Studio album by Doves
- Released: 21 February 2005
- Recorded: 2004–2005
- Studio: Moolah Rouge, Stockport; Parr Street Studios, Liverpool; The Old School House, Fort Augustus; Fort Augustus Abbey; 2 kHz, Shepherd's Bush; The Dairy, Brixton; Angel Recording Studios, Islington, London; Whitfield Street Studios, Soho; Panarific; Andy Williams' house
- Genre: Indie rock
- Length: 46:50
- Label: Heavenly
- Producer: Doves and Ben Hillier

Doves chronology
Lost Sides (2003)	Some Cities (2005)	Kingdom of Rust (2009)

Singles from Some Cities
- 1. "Black and White Town" Released: 7 February 2005; 2. "Snowden" Released: 9 May 2005; 3. "Sky Starts Falling" Released: 12 September 2005

Some Cities is the third studio album by the British indie rock band Doves. The album was released by Heavenly Recordings on 21 February 2005, and became the band's second consecutive album to top the UK Albums Chart at number 1. Some Cities was conceived as a rawer, stripped-down record, and conceptually touches upon the physical changes of the band's hometown of Manchester, as well as emotional transformations.

The album features the band's second-highest charting single, "Black and White Town", which peaked at number 6 on the UK Singles Chart. Two further singles from the album—"Snowden" and "Sky Starts Falling"—also fared moderately well on the chart, peaking at number 17 and 45, respectively.

== Background and recording ==
After the worldwide success of Doves' second album The Last Broadcast, Jez Williams recalled, in a 2010 interview with Under the Radar following the release of the band's compilation album The Places Between: The Best of Doves, that the band decided to take a more "stripped-down" approach to recording Some Cities, which included decamping to rural locations in England, Scotland, and Wales. "With [Some Cities] we were also wanting to make a few social comments about the area we lived in. There's a lot of subject matter on that album dealing with change. Buildings get ripped down and replaced by more generic ones. It kind of gave ourselves a bit of purpose to write about it. We also listened to a lot of Motown and Northern soul, and I think that came out in that album. It was a definite change. Our albums do tend to change character and personality with every release."

Initially, the band set out to record their third album with producer William Orbit. In a February 2005 interview with The Irish Times, vocalist/bassist Jimi Goodwin said, "Jeff Barrett from our label, Heavenly, suggested we work with William and we were fine with that, we're always up for trying new stuff. But I think we expected too much from him. He was happy just to be in the studio with us because he hadn't worked with a band since Blur. His point was he was just recording what he was hearing. He wasn't doing anything that we wouldn't do ourselves normally and we put a lot of pressure on him almost to subvert us. He's a top guy, but it just didn't work." The band subsequently co-produced Some Cities with Ben Hillier, who also mixed the album (except for "Some Cities" and "Walk in Fire", which were mixed by Rich Costey). Much of the recording occurred at a farmhouse in the English countryside over the course of 2004, except for closing track "Ambition", which was recorded in an empty Benedictine monastery in Scotland, which the band had found while doing a photo shoot for the album. The huge reverb effect was achieved using the acoustics of the main hall. The recording process is shown in the mini-documentary Cities Under Construction, featured on the bonus DVD included with the special edition of the album.

In a 2010 interview with Spinner.com, Jimi Goodwin stated, "I look back fondly at the Some Cities period, going to this old schoolhouse in Scotland with Ben Nevis out the window. I spent six weeks up there and didn't want to come home; my mum had just died and I just wanted to be away."

== Release ==
Some Cities was released in the United Kingdom on 21 February 2005, where it entered the UK Albums Chart at number 1. The album was released on several different formats in the UK: the standard CD and double 12" vinyl LP, and also as a special edition with a bonus DVD containing a short documentary entitled Cities Under Construction, featuring the making of the album inside a purple-coloured digipak. In addition, a limited-edition version, packaged inside a hessian cloth-covered box with fold-out poster and bonus DVD, was also released. The album was released in Japan on 23 February 2005 and included two bonus tracks, "Eleven Miles Out" and "At the Tower" (which had been released as B-sides to "Black and White Town"). On 1 March 2005, the album was released in North America by Capitol Records.

In late December 2004, the album's first single "Black and White Town" was issued to radio stations; two weeks prior to the album's release, the single was released commercially and entered the UK Singles Chart at number 6, the band's second-highest charting single to date. In May 2005, the album's second single "Snowden" was released and peaked at number 17. The third and final single "Sky Starts Falling" was released in September 2005 and peaked at number 45. Throughout 2005, Doves rigorously toured the world, including England, the United States, and Australia; in April 2006, a special download-only EP entitled Some Cities Live EP, featuring select recordings from various dates on the Some Cities tour, was released to online digital outlets.

== Reception ==
Professional ratings
Aggregate scores
Source	Rating
Metacritic	72/100
Review scores
Source	Rating
AllMusic	4/5 stars
Austin Chronicle	4/5 stars
Drowned in Sound	9/10
Entertainment Weekly	A−
The Guardian	3/5 stars
Pitchfork	7.8/10
PopMatters	7/10
Q	4/5 stars
Stylus Magazine	D+
Uncut	4/5 stars

Some Cities was released to generally positive reviews. Drowned in Sound awarded the album a 9 out of 10 rating, saying, "Though it may be gentle and frequently maudlin, it is no doubt a release to spend 50 minutes with this record. Some Cities may not be a summer record, but it might quite possibly be the record that gets you through it." MusicOMH praised the album, calling it "an ethereal outpouring of emotion; melancholic madness meeting soul-soaring serendipity head on," and noted that, "Gone is the prog-like polished production of The Last Broadcast, it's more akin to debut Lost Souls in timbre. Yet while those were records that sounded like they were conceived in wide open countryside or of the rolling sea this is an ode to the industrial heartland of their childhood; at turns crunching and urban, desolate and apocalyptic." Pitchfork Media gave Some Cities a 7.8 out of 10 rating, and concluded that, "In the three years since Last Broadcast, Doves have cultivated a better understanding of their strengths and limitations, and Some Cities beams with a revivified looseness."

== Track listing ==
All tracks are written by Jez Williams, Jimi Goodwin, and Andy Williams, except where noted.

No.	Title	Writer(s)	Lead vocals	Length
1.	"Some Cities"		Goodwin	3:22
2.	"Black and White Town"		Goodwin	4:15
3.	"Almost Forgot Myself"		Goodwin	4:42
4.	"Snowden"		Goodwin	4:12
5.	"The Storm"	Williams, Goodwin, Williams, Ryuichi Sakamoto (Note: Contains elements of Snake Eyes score, composed by Ryuichi Sakamoto.)	J. Williams	4:52
6.	"Walk in Fire"		Goodwin	5:34
7.	"One of These Days"		Goodwin	4:50
8.	"Someday Soon"		Goodwin	4:08
9.	"Shadows of Salford"		A. Williams	2:44
10.	"Sky Starts Falling"		Goodwin	4:11
11.	"Ambition"		Goodwin	4:00

Japan bonus tracks
No.	Title	Writer(s)	Lead vocals	Length
12.	"Eleven Miles Out"		Goodwin	4:32
13.	"At the Tower"	Williams, Goodwin, Williams, Lee Hazlewood (Note: Contains elements of "Come on Home to Me", written by Lee Hazlewood.)	Goodwin (verses), A. Williams (chorus)	4:37

== Bonus DVD ==
1. Cities Under Construction – a short film, edited by Matthew Norman
2. Photo gallery (set to an instrumental version of "Ambition")
3. "Black and White Town" video (director's cut, directed by Lynne Ramsay)

== Release history ==
Country	Date	Label	Format	Catalogue #
United Kingdom	21 February 2005	Heavenly Recordings	CD	HVNLP50CD
United Kingdom	21 February 2005	Heavenly Recordings	Special edition CD/DVD in purple digipak	HVNLP50CDS
United Kingdom	21 February 2005	Heavenly Recordings	Limited edition CD/DVD in hessian cloth-covered box	HVNLP50CDX
United Kingdom	21 February 2005	Heavenly Recordings	Double LP (heavyweight vinyl; gatefold sleeve)	HVNLP50
Japan	23 February 2005	Toshiba-EMI	CD (2 bonus tracks)	TOCP-66327
United States	1 March 2005	Capitol Records/EMI	CD	724387460928
Europe	31 May 2019	Universal Strategic Marketing/Virgin EMI	Double LP (limited/numbered edition on white-coloured vinyl)	7748265
United Kingdom	27 November 2020	Universal Strategic Marketing/Virgin EMI	Double LP (black vinyl)	856872
United States	15 January 2021	Universal Strategic Marketing/Virgin EMI	Double LP (black vinyl)	856872

== Credits ==
=== Doves ===
- Jimi Goodwin – lead vocals (except tracks 5 and 9), bass, acoustic guitar
- Jez Williams – guitars, backing vocals, lead vocals on "The Storm", synthesiser
- Andy Williams – drums, backing vocals, lead vocals and piano on "Shadows of Salford", harmonica on "The Storm"

=== Additional musicians ===
- Ben Hillier – percussion on "Some Cities," glockenspiel on "Snowden," and piano and percussion on "The Storm"
- Guy Garvey – backing vocals on "Almost Forgot Myself" and "Snowden"
- Strings on "Snowden" and "The Storm" performed by Millennia Strings; arranged by Ian Burdge, contracted by Jonathan Brigden at Knifedge
- Andrea Wright – additional footsteps and street noise on "The Storm"
- Janet Remus – backing vocals on "Walk in Fire"
- Martin Rebelski – piano on "Black and White Town," and accordion on "Shadows of Salford"

=== Technical ===
- Produced by Doves and Ben Hillier.
- Mixed by Ben Hillier and Doves, except "Some Cities" and "Walk in Fire" mixed by Rich Costey.
- Recorded and mixed at: Moolah Rouge, Stockport; Parr Street Studios, Liverpool; The Old School House, Fort Augustus; Fort Augustus Abbey; 2 kHz, Shepherd's Bush; The Dairy, Brixton; Angel Recording Studios; Whitfield Street Studios, Soho; Panarific; and Andy's house.
- Engineering and programming by Ben Hillier and Richard Morris.
- Assistant engineering by Andrea Wright.
- Engineering at 2 kHz by Dan Austin.
- Debris wording by Doves, Jemma Kennedy, and Rick Myers.

== Charts ==
Chart (2005)	Peak position
Australian Albums Chart	23
Belgium Ultratop	45
French Chart	149
Irish Albums Chart	2
Japan Oricon	149
MegaCharts Netherlands	62
UK Albums Chart	1
US Billboard 200	111

== Certifications ==
Region	Certification	Certified units/sales
Ireland (IRMA)	Gold	7,500^{^}
United Kingdom (BPI)	Gold	100,000^{^}
^{^} Shipments figures based on certification alone.
