= Kingdom of Rust (song) =

Single by Doves

from the album Kingdom of Rust
- B-side: "Push Me On"
- Released: 30 March 2009
- Recorded: 2006–2009
- Genre: Indie rock
- Length: 4:22 (radio edit); 5:13 (album version)
- Label: Heavenly Records; Virgin Records/EMI
- Songwriters: Jez Williams, Jimi Goodwin, Andy Williams
- Producers: Doves, Dan Austin

Doves singles chronology
"'Some Cities Live'" (2006)	"Kingdom of Rust" (2009)	"Winter Hill" (2009)

Music video
- "Kingdom of Rust" on YouTube

"Kingdom of Rust" is the first single from Doves' fourth studio album of the same name. The single was released on 30 March 2009 via Heavenly Records. The 7" single features the exclusive track "Push Me On," which was produced by John Leckie, while the CD single features an edited remix of "Push Me On" by Playgroup. Three limited edition 12" singles featuring remixes by Prins Thomas, Playgroup, Still Going, and The Glimmers were released on 13 April 2009. "Kingdom of Rust" was played for the first time on Zane Lowe's BBC Radio 1 show on 2 February 2009. The single debuted on the UK Singles Chart at #28. The song also featured in the 2009 American horror/comedy film Zombieland, in the series 14 Bolivia Special, series 16 Middle East Special of Top Gear and the series finale of The Grand Tour.

The music video for the song, directed by China Moo-Young and starring Neil Newbon, premiered on 11 February 2009. Stereogum posted a free MP3 download of Playgroup's Megamix of "Push Me On" (the full-length version) on 9 March 2009.

== Track listings ==
All tracks are written by Jez Williams, Jimi Goodwin, and Andy Williams.

Promo CD (HVN189CDRP)
No.	Title	Length
1.	"Kingdom of Rust" (Radio Edit)	4:22
2.	"Kingdom of Rust" (Album Version)	5:13
3.	"Kingdom of Rust" (Instrumental)	5:16

UK CD (HVN189CD)
No.	Title	Length
1.	"Kingdom of Rust"	5:13
2.	"Push Me On" (Playgroup Megamix Edit)	9:30

UK 7" vinyl (HVN189)
No.	Title	Length
1.	"Kingdom of Rust"	5:13
2.	"Push Me On"	3:55

UK limited edition 12" #1 (HVN18912P1)
No.	Title	Length
1.	"Push Me On" (Playgroup Megamix)	11:44
2.	"Push Me On" (Playgroup Megadub)	11:43

UK limited edition 12" #2 (HVN18912P2)
No.	Title	Length
1.	"Kingdom of Rust" (Still Going Remix)	5:24
2.	"Kingdom of Rust" (Prins Thomas Diskomiks)	8:20

UK limited edition 12" #3 (HVN18912P3)
No.	Title	Length
1.	"Push Me On" (The Glimmers Mix)	5:57
2.	"Push Me On"	3:55

Digital download
No.	Title	Length
1.	"Kingdom of Rust"	5:13
2.	"Kingdom of Rust" (Acoustic)	4:01

== Credits ==
- "Kingdom of Rust" produced by Doves and Dan Austin; mixed by Michael H. Brauer.
- "Push Me On" produced by Doves and John Leckie; mixed by John Leckie and Dan Austin.
- "Push Me On" (Playgroup Megamix) reproduced and mixed by Trevor Jackson for The Playgroup 2009.
- "Kingdom of Rust" (Still Going Remix) remixed by Eric Duncan and Olivier Spencer for DFA Records.
- "Kingdom of Rust" (Prins Thomas Diskomiks) remixed by Thomas Moen Hermansen.
- "Push Me On" (The Glimmers Mix) remixed by Mo Becha and David "Benoelie" Fouquaert.
- Sleeve design by Rick Myers; shot on location at Northlandz, Flemington, New Jersey.

== Charts ==
Chart (2009)	Peak position
UK Singles (Official Charts)	28
