= Salvatore (band) =

Norwegian instrumental rock band

- Origin: Oslo, Norway
- Genres: Post-rock, ambient, progressive rock, space rock, electronic
- Years active: 1998–2008
- Labels: Racing Junior, Rocket Racer
- Past members: Ola Fløttum; Bjarne Larsen; John Birger Wormdahl; Kjell Olav Jørgensen; Jon Platou Selvig; Karim Sayed; Jørgen Skjulstad; Leon Muraglia "Avanti"

Salvatore was a Norwegian instrumental rock band influenced by post-rock, electronic, and krautrock. The band was formed in 1998 and disbanded in 2008.

== History ==
Salvatore was founded in Oslo in 1998 by John Birger Wormdahl, along with Ola Fløttum, Bjarne Larsen, and Kjell-Olav Jørgensen. Inspired following a session of listening to the German Krautrock band Neu!, they formed Salvatore shortly after.

The following year (1998) saw the band enter and win the Norwegian music contest "Zoom", and embark on a "Zoom-tour" in Norway, England and Scotland the following spring of 1999.

The year 2000 saw the recording and release of their first two albums. Their debut album, Clingfilm, was released in October, with the second album, Jugend - A New Hedonism, released a month later, in November.

Jugend - A New Hedonism, was recorded during Easter time of 2000, when the band travelled to Morocco with the Norwegian theater group De Utvalgte (The Chosen Ones). This second album served as the soundtrack to the theater group's production of "The Picture of Dorian Gray".

Both albums were released on the record label Racing Junior.

Jon Platou Selvig joined the band in 2001, and their third album Fresh was released in October of that year.

In 2002, percussionist Karim Sayed joined the band.

Their fourth album, Tempo, was recorded in 2002 in Chicago and mixed by John McEntire. It won the Spellemannprisen 2002 award for Best Record in the Electronica Genre. Salvatore continued to remain busy, participating in the Earworm compilation, in the same year.

Their fifth album, Luxus, was recorded in Oslo in 2003 by Ingar Hunskaar. Ola Fløttum left the band this year, and the third album, Fresh, was licensed and re-released by the San Diego label Rocketracer.

In January 2004, the band welcomed a new member, Jørgen Skjulstad, and they embarked on their first European tour. Luxus was mixed by John McEntire in Chicago and released in April hot off the back of the first part of the tour. In June, the European tour continued, with Salvatore as the supporting band to Tortoise, of which, John McEntire was a member.

In 2005 the band went on further tours, to Germany, Austria, Italy and the Balkans. This year saw a further change to the line up of the band, with Jon Platou Selvig quitting, and Leon Muraglia joining.

A year's hiatus ended, with latest member, Anthony Barratt, joining just before the release of their sixth and final album, Days of Rage, on New Years Day 2007. This latest release went on to win the Spellemansprisen 2007 award, again in the electronica genre.

After ten years, the band chose to dissolve itself in June 2008, due to the logistical problems of coordinating an ever changing and increasing band membership and a feeling that they were not progressing creatively.

Three of the four original members, John Birger Wormdahl, Bjarne Larsen, and Kjell-Olav Jørgensen went on to form the band MASSELYS in 2008, and continue to record and perform to current day.

== Discography ==
- Clingfilm (2000)
- Jugend – A New Hedonism (2000)
- Fresh (2001)
- Tempo (2002)
- Luxus (2004)
- Days of Rage (2007)

== Members ==
- Bjarne Larsen: guitar, bass guitar (1998–2008)
- John Birger Wormdahl: keyboard, guitar, sampling (1998–2008)
- Kjell-Olav Jørgensen: drums (1998–2008)
- Karim Sayed: drums, percussion (2002–2008)
- Leon Muraglia: electronics (2005–2008)
- Anthony Barratt: guitar (2006–2008)
- Ola Fløttum: guitar, bass (1998–2003)
- Jon Platou Selvig: sampling, keyboard (2001–2005)
- Jørgen Skjulstad/DJ Sissyfus: misc. instruments (2004–2006)

Awards
| Preceded by Röyksopp | Recipient of the Elektronika Spellemannprisen; 2002 | Succeeded by Xploding Plastix |
| Preceded by Lindstrøm | Recipient of the Elektronika Spellemannprisen; 2007 | Succeeded by Röyksopp |
