= Ward's Reservoir =

Reservoir in Lancashire, England

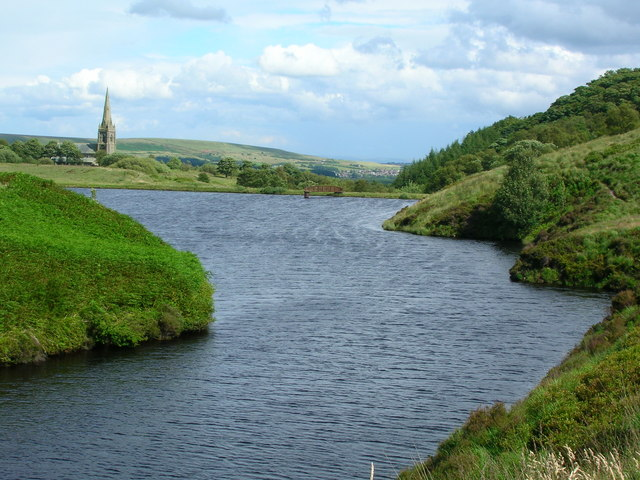

- Shown within Blackburn with Darwen
- Location: Lancashire, England
- Coordinates: 53°38′17″N 2°30′2″W
- Surface area: 0.3 km^{2} (0.12 sq mi)
- Max. depth: 24.4 m (80 ft)
- Water volume: 150,000 m^{3} (5,300,000 cu ft)

Ward's Reservoir (or Wards Reservoir), known locally as the Blue Lagoon, is a small reservoir close to the village of Belmont, Lancashire, England. It is in the West Pennine Moors north of Bolton.

The reservoir did not supply drinking water but was built to supply water to Rycroft Works in the early 19th century. It was enlarged in 1893 by Deacons who used the water to supply Belmont Bleachworks. It holds 150,000 cubic metres of water, with a surface area of 28,000 square metres, when full. Most of the reservoir is only a few feet deep, but it has a depth of about 80 feet (24 m) at its deepest point.

The reservoir was drained by its owner, Belmont Holdings, in 2010, despite efforts by local residents to save it. It had fallen into a state of disrepair following the closure of the bleachworks, and was considered a flood risk by the Environment Agency.

By the end of August 2010 heavy rain had refilled the reservoir, and in September 2010 it was sold for £50,000. The buyer is thought to be a Horwich-based consortium who will renovate and develop the reservoir for recreational use.
