= It's Alright Between Us as It Is =

Studio album by Lindstrøm
- Released: 20 October 2017
- Length: 51:31
- Label: Smalltown Supersound

Lindstrøm chronology
Smalhans (2012)	It's Alright Between Us as It Is (2017)	On a Clear Day I Can See You Forever (2019)

Professional ratings
Aggregate scores
Source	Rating
AnyDecentMusic?	6.7/10
Metacritic	74/100
Review scores
Source	Rating
AllMusic	4/5 stars
Blurt	3/5 stars
Clash	6/10
Drowned in Sound	7/10
Exclaim!	6/10
Pitchfork	6.5/10

It's Alright Between Us as It Is is the fourth studio album by Norwegian electronic musician Hans-Peter Lindstrøm. It was released on 20 October 2017 through Smalltown Supersound.

== Track listing ==
No.	Title	Length
1.	"It's Alright Between Us as It Is"	0:51
2.	"Spire"	5:15
3.	"Tensions"	6:51
4.	"But It Isn't"	5:22
5.	"Versatile Dreams (Interlude)"	2:38
6.	"Shinin"	7:02
7.	"Drift"	7:38
8.	"Bungl (Like a Ghost)"	7:00
9.	"Under Trees"	8:54
