= Winter Hill (North West England) =

Hill in North West England

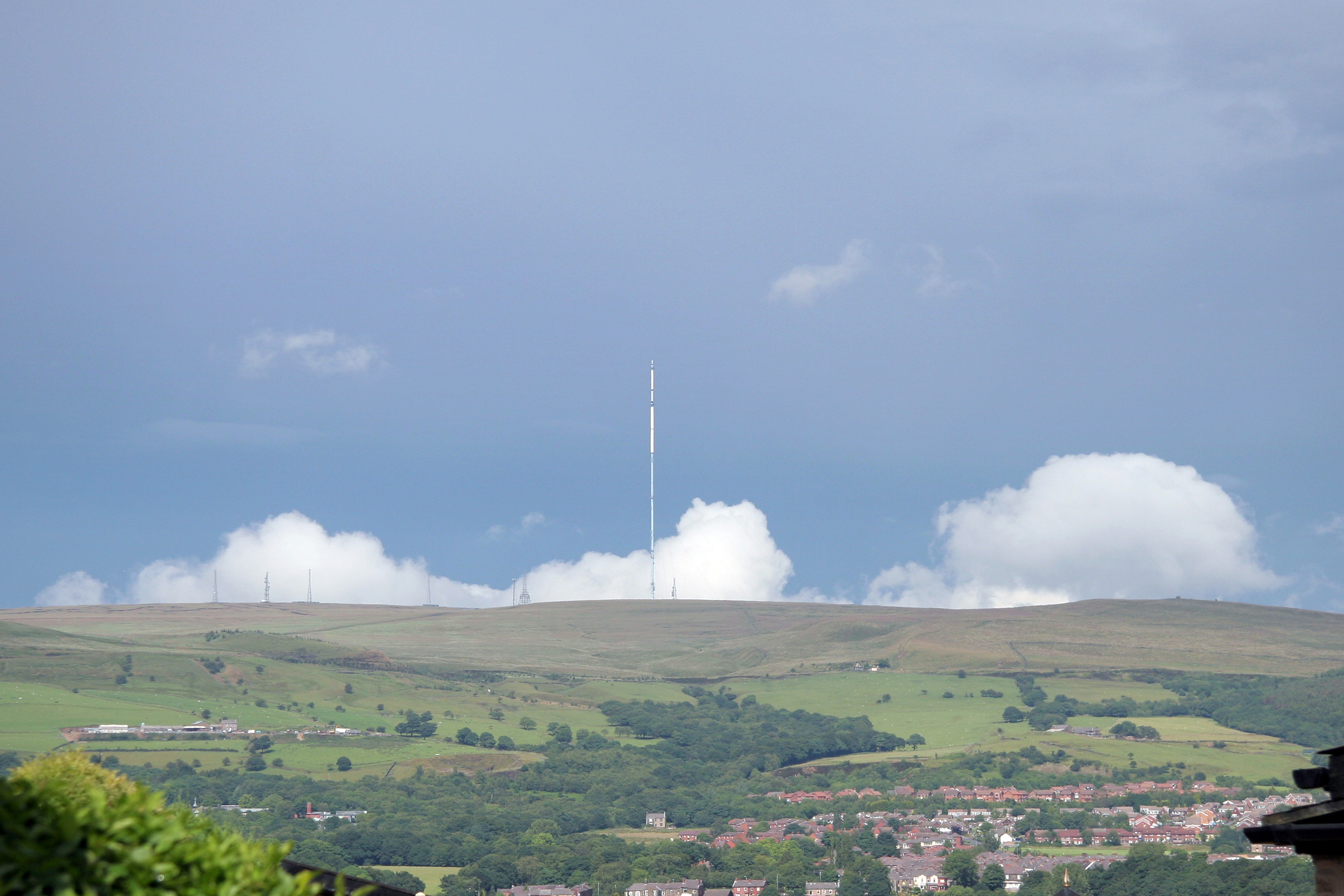
- Winter Hill from Blackrod. The mast can be seen for many miles around.

Highest point
- Elevation: 1,496 ft (456 m)
- Prominence: 715 ft (218 m)
- Parent peak: Hail Storm Hill
- Listing: Marilyn
- Coordinates: 53°37′48″N 2°30′54″W

Geography
- Location within Lancashire Location within Greater Manchester Location within the Borough of Chorley Location within Blackburn with Darwen
- Location: North West England
- OS grid: SD659149
- Topo map: OS Landranger 109

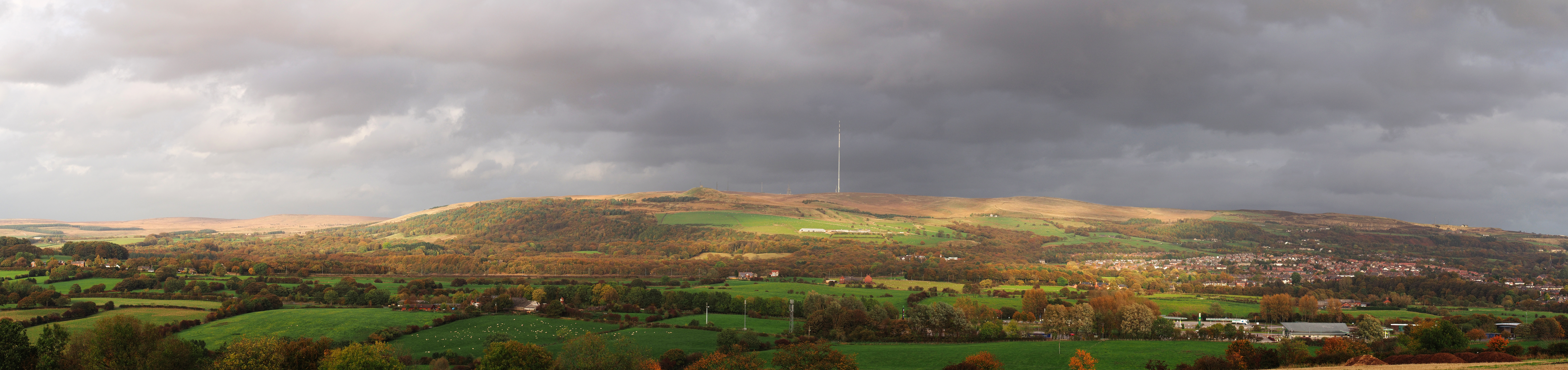
Panorama of Winter Hill, taken from Blackrod

Winter Hill is a hill on which the three boroughs of Chorley, Blackburn with Darwen and Bolton meet in North West England. It is located on Rivington Moor, Chorley, and is 1,496 feet (456 m) high. Part of the West Pennine Moors, it is a popular walking area, and has been the site of mining activity, aeroplane disasters and a murder.

Its prominent position made it the ideal site for the Winter Hill TV Mast, transmitting to a large part of North West England. There are also a number of other telecommunication masts and towers around the summit and side of the hill for mobile phones, Professional Mobile Radio users and emergency services. Lancashire Constabulary was the first to use the site for one of their base stations in 1950; they had to build the road and it is said to have been built by policemen.

Paths to the summit lead from Belmont (in Blackburn with Darwen), Rivington (in Chorley), and Horwich and Blackrod (in Bolton). The summit can also be reached via a short walk from the top of a road pass 1 1/4 miles (2 km) west of Belmont. The hill is a prominent natural landmark on the skyline for the most of Chorley and further afield. Winter Hill's topographic prominence results in it being classified as a Marilyn. The trig point on its summit marks the highest point in Blackburn with Darwen whereas the highest point in Bolton is 440 yards (400 m) away on its south east slope at 1,467 feet (447 m) above sea level.

It provides views over Lancashire, Cheshire, Merseyside and Greater Manchester, including Manchester city centre, Salford, Werneth Low, Wigan and Bolton. In clear weather conditions, locations such as Blackpool Tower, the Dream in Sutton, St Helens, Jodrell Bank Observatory, Snaefell in the Isle of Man, the Cumbrian mountains, Liverpool, Southport, the Irish Sea, the Pennines and much of the North West of England, can be seen. On a clear day, views from the summit include four national parks: the Lake District, Yorkshire Dales, Peak District and Snowdonia in North Wales.

== History ==
The bare hilltop was once covered by woodland that may have been destroyed by fire and it is thought that the hill was once inhabited, though no remains have been found. There is a Bronze Age round cairn dating from 1600–1400 BC on the hill. In 1883, a local historian recorded the old name for Winter Hill as Edgar Hill, named in connection to Saxon King Edgar

=== Burial mounds ===
Two burial mounds dating from the Bronze Age are located near the peak. On 24 March 1957, two men discovered "curved lines of stones" sticking out of the peat forming a two feet high wall which surrounded a raised area in the middle. In July 1958, a group from the University of Manchester excavated the central mound only to find it had been excavated 250 years earlier. The site was thought to have originated from 1500 BC in the Middle Bronze Age.

The second mound was found to the west on the southern edge of Noon Hill. The site was excavated in August 1958 by the Bolton & District Archaeological Society, revealing two lines of stones and human remains. Both are scheduled monuments.

=== Two Lads ===
There is a large cairn on the summit of Two Lads on Crooked Edge Hill on the south west side of Winter Hill. In the late 1700s there were apparently two close together. Another cairn was built in the late 20th century by a local man. It is smaller, some 40 metres from the large cairn. The remains of what appears to have been a third cairn is between the two that exist. It is doubtful however that it was ever a cairn as such. There is no photographic record of one. It is more likely a store of stones to be used to repair the main cairn. The site was originally known as 'Wilder Lads', originally united by a circular mound. The cairns height had been increased by a landowner, noted by local historian Thomas Hampson in 1883, at the time the cairns were thought to be Saxon. Hampson described the original Two Lads as the graves of two children of a Saxon king, Edgar, and recorded that Winter Hill was previously known as Edgar Hill. A legend exists that the cairns mark the site on which two boys lost their way on the moor and died of exposure in a snowstorm. In 1953/54 John Winstanley, Archaeologist had recorded Roman finds near this site, he concluded the site was once a Roman encampment. Flint chippings were found indicating much earlier use of this site.

=== Scotsman's Stump ===
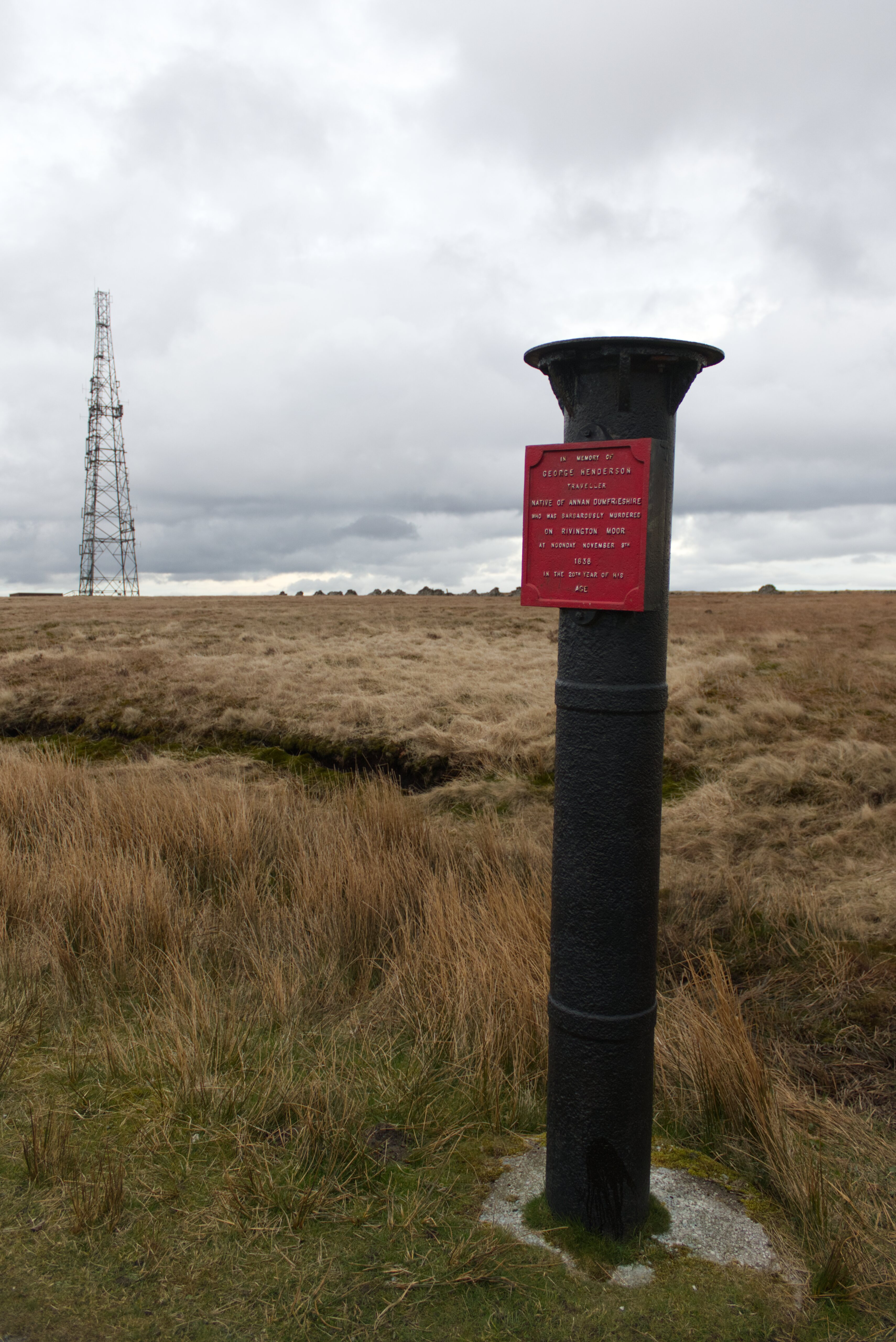
Scotsman's Stump in 2025

On 9 November 1838 George Henderson, a Scottish merchant walking over the hill from Horwich to Blackburn, was murdered by gunshot. A local poacher, James Whittle, was put on trial for the murder, but found not guilty. No one was subsequently charged for the murder. A monument was erected in 1912 to replace an earlier bush planted at the spot, sited at the side of the road opposite the television station. Scotsman's Stump was celebrated in a poem entitled 'Scotchman's Stump' by Bolton poet John Cassidy. It was published in his collection Night Cries, published by Bloodaxe in 1982.

=== Air disasters ===
There have been over two dozen aircraft crashes on and around Winter Hill; the earliest being a single-seat fighter of the Royal Flying Corps and include a two-seater aircraft in the 1920s. During World War II an American Fairchild UC-61 Forwarder (41-54885) of 5th Air Depot Group crashed on 7 August 1942. On 12 November 1943 a Wellington bomber crashed below Rivington Pike; all six crew members died. They are commemorated in a memorial at the site. On 24 December 1943, an Airspeed Oxford (BM837) of 410 Squadron crashed on the hill. Other crashes have included several Spitfires, Hurricanes and a Gloster Meteor which crashed in 1953.

The worst occurred on 27 February 1958; known as the Winter Hill air disaster, a Silver City Bristol 170 Freighter (G-AICS) travelling from the Isle of Man to Manchester crashed into Winter Hill several hundred yards away from the transmitter. 35 passengers and crew were killed in the accident. There is a memorial plaque to the accident at the site.

In September 1965 an RAF De Havilland Chipmunk flew into the hill in cloud, without serious injury to the crew. The last crash occurred in October 1968 when a Cessna 172 force-landed between Winter Hill and Rivington Pike.

=== 2018 wildfire ===
In 2018, a large wildfire broke out on the 28 June. It burned over 7 square miles (18 km^{2}) of moorland, with one hundred firefighters sent to tackle the blaze. In total, the fire burned for 41 days, and caused a major incident to be declared. A man was later arrested for arson on suspicion of causing the wildfire. The fire, along with the Saddleworth Moor fire (which also burned over 7 square miles of land) has been described by local councillor Brenda Warrington as the "worst series of moor fires in living memory". It has affected local wildlife, killing both flora and fauna in an "internationally important ecosystem" as described by the Woodland Trust. The fire destroyed over a fifth of the moorland on the hill, and it may take a decade to recover fully. Concerns were raised in 2011 to Natural England regarding moorland management with warnings of increased fire risk due to policy of United Utilities to reduce grazing, whilst not using other land management measures including cutting or controlled burning to reduce fire risks.

=== Rights to Roam ===
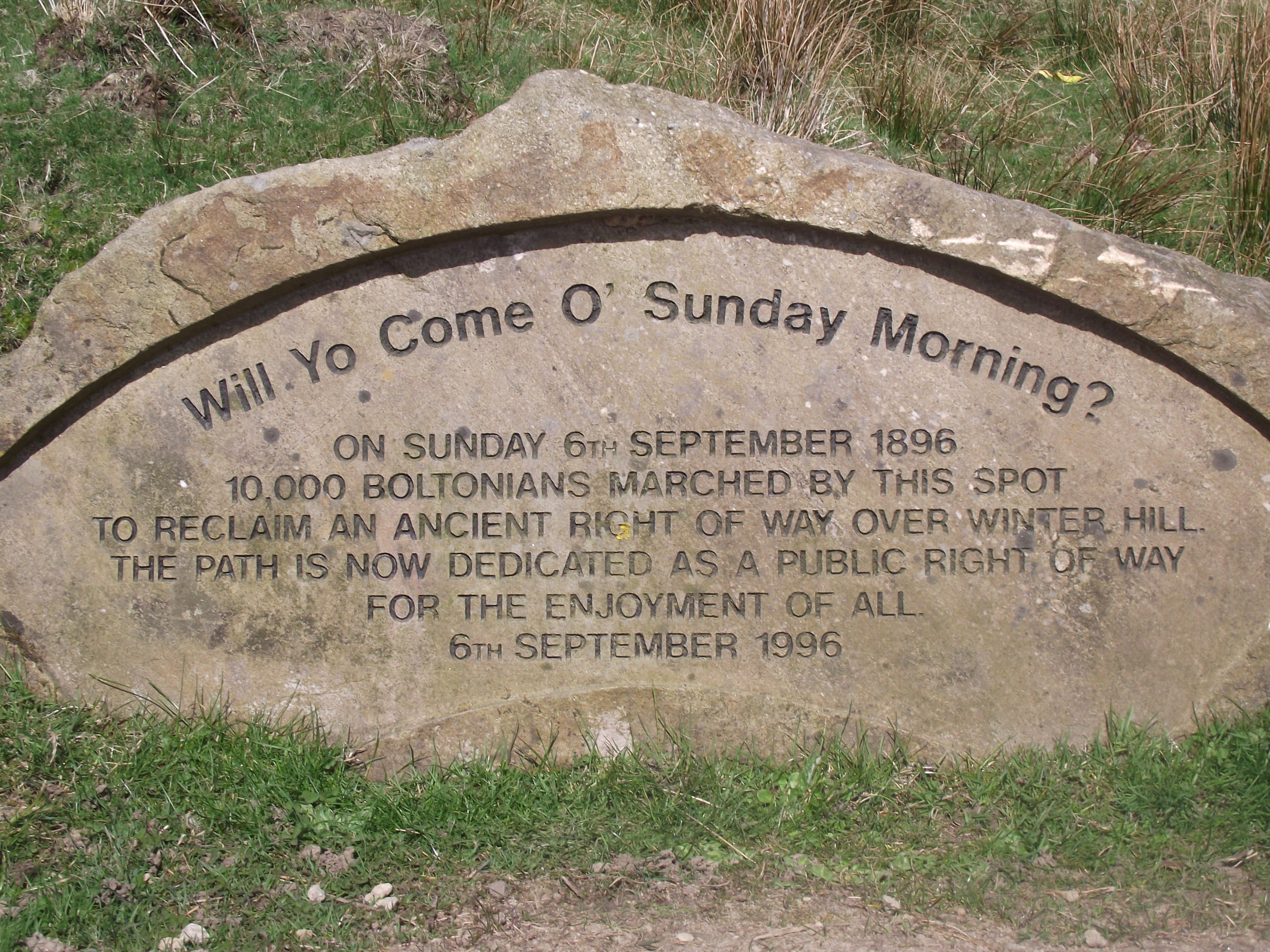
Stone commemorating the mass trespass of 1896

The area is popular with walkers and footpaths and bridleways provide access to the hillside and surrounding moorland. Winter Hill was the site of a mass trespass in 1896 after the owner of the Smithills Hall estate, Colonel Richard Henry Ainsworth tried to stop public access. On 6 September some 10,000 people marched from Bolton to the open countryside in a mass demonstration, breaking down the barriers he had erected and gaining access to the moor. The following week the demonstrators successfully repeated the march which is considered an early forerunner of the Kinder Scout mass trespass. The demonstration is commemorated by a memorial stone on Coal Pit Road, below Smithills Moor. The hill and surrounding moorland area is open access land with a legally protected right to roam.

=== Claimed UFO sightings ===
Winter Hill is something of a magnet for UFO sightings UFOs have been reported on Winter Hill since 1950, when a witness described a "dark flat iron shaped object hovering close to the ground" and an encounter with a being that returned to a craft before disappearing. In 1999, in what became known as the "Murphy Incident", a farmer said he saw an object hovering over his cattle field. On investigation, the object moved away and the farmer reported the incident to the police. The farmer returned to the field, wearing just a cardigan, and discovered the object had reappeared. He reported the incident to the Manchester Aerial Phenomena Investigation Team (MAPIT), who investigated it. While MAPIT was conducting its investigation, they alleged they were being followed by a green moon-man in a shuttlecock-shaped flying saucer. The farmer reported that he was warned by officials from the Ministry of Agriculture, Fisheries and Food but has not been traced since the incident, and the current owner has not spoken about it.

The UK government released previously classified information on UFO sightings in May 2006; one picture appeared to show an unidentified object over Winter Hill.

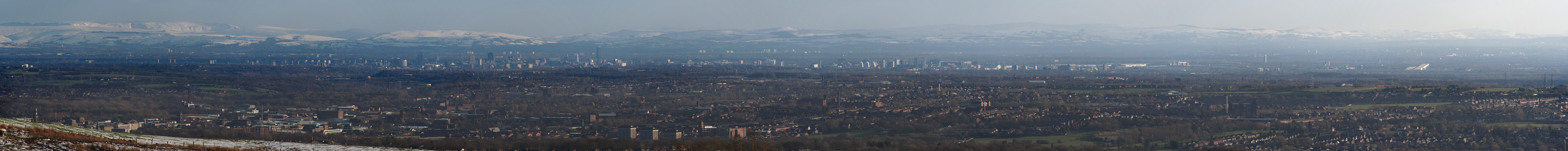
A panoramic view of the Greater Manchester conurbation, from Matchmoor Lane on the western side of Winter Hill. Bolton is the large town in the foreground, with all the major Manchester city landmarks visible in the middle distance.

== References in song ==
The song "Winter Hill" on A Certain Ratio's 1981 album To Each..., consists of drumming, whistling and a low-pitched drone alternating between two notes a tone apart for its entire length. On a visit to Winter Hill in 1988, a piece of electronic equipment was found which made a high-pitched drone and alternated between two notes a tone apart.

The song "Winter Hill" on Doves' 2009 album Kingdom of Rust, also references the site.

== Viewfinder plaque ==
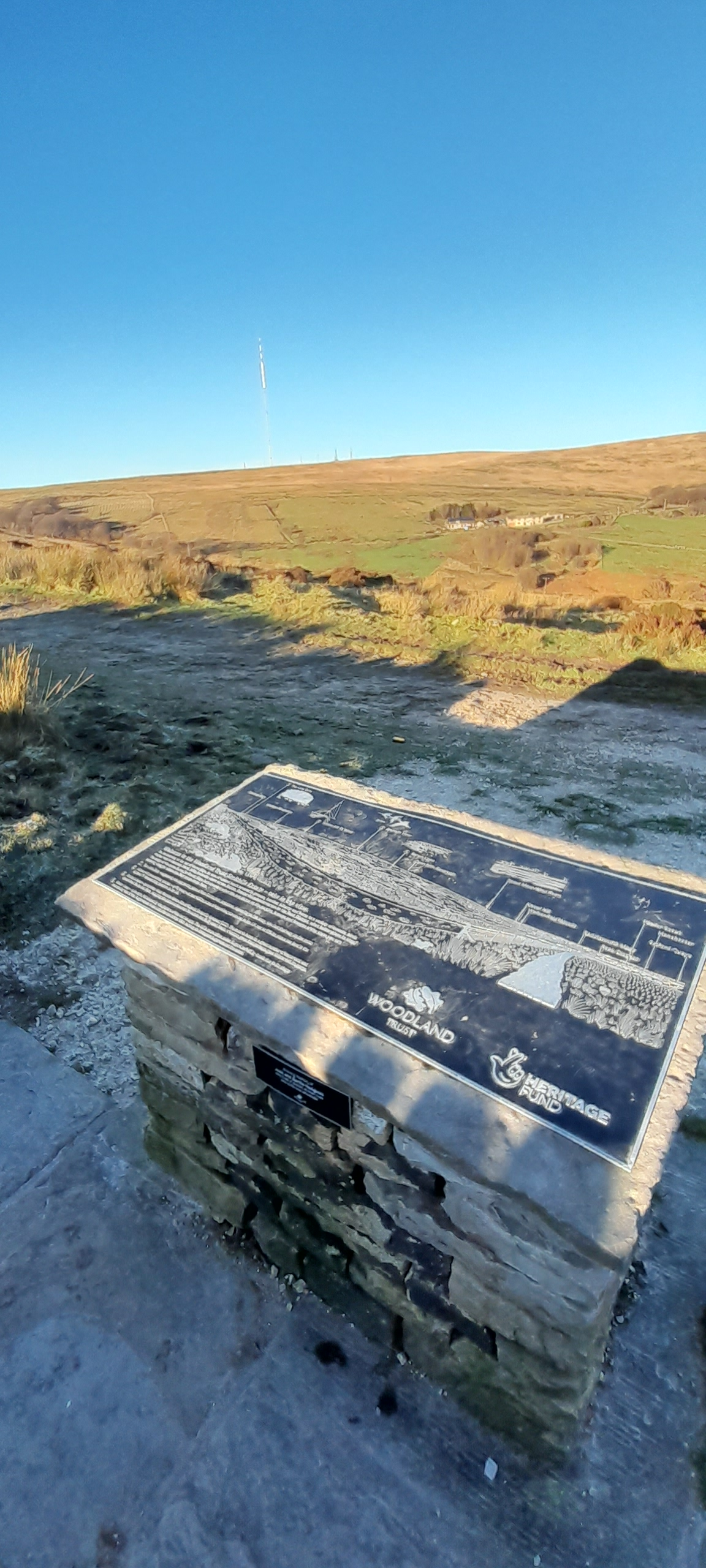
Viewfinder plaque

A metal plaque shows the direction for Two Lads Cairn, Winter Hill TV mast, Smithills Moor, Brown Lowe, Scout Moor Wind Farm, Knowl Hill, Walker Fold Woods, Saddleworth Moor, Peak District, Kinder Scout, Manchester and Salford Quays. The image on the left shows Winter Hill and the TV mast along with Holdens Farm. On the plinth is a metal memorial plate which reads "In loving memory to Joan and Bartle Hodgkiss...". The plaque is on a continuing path along Burnt Edge Lane, 200m past Slack Hall and overlooking Burnt Edge at SD666124.

== Nearby hill summits ==
Winter Hill is ringed by an arc of twelve lower prominences, from Noon Hill in the west to Whinberry Hill to the east-southeast.

Name	Locality	Elevation	Bearing approx.	OS grid reference
Winter Hill ^{†}	Rivington	456 metres (1,496 ft)	—	SD659149
Counting Hill	Smithills/Belmont	433 metres (1,421 ft)	120°	SD671141
Two Lads Hill ^{†}	Horwich	389 metres (1,276 ft)	225°	SD655133
Noon Hill ^{†}	Rivington	380 metres (1,247 ft)	275°	SD647150
Crooked Edge Hill	Horwich	375 metres (1,230 ft)	235°	SD654134
Rivington Pike	Rivington	363 metres (1,191 ft)	245°	SD643138
Adam Hill	Horwich	360 metres (1,181 ft)	200°	SD660126
White Brow	Horwich	358 metres (1,175 ft)	190°	SD661124
Whimberry Hill	Belmont	340 metres (1,115 ft)	115°	SD686139
Egg Hillock	Belmont	328 metres (1,076 ft)	110°	SD684142
Brown Hill	Rivington	325 metres (1,066 ft)	240°	SD644135
Brown Lowe	Smithills	325 metres (1,066 ft)	160°	SD669130
Burnt Edge	Horwich	325 metres (1,066 ft)	170°	SD667125
† Denotes walker's cairn or similar.

== See also ==
- Scheduled monuments in Lancashire
