= Sky Starts Falling =

2005 single by Doves

Single by Doves

from the album Some Cities
- Released: 12 September 2005
- Length: 4:11
- Label: Heavenly
- Songwriters: Jez Williams, Jimi Goodwin, Andy Williams
- Producers: Doves, Ben Hillier

Doves singles chronology
"Snowden" (2005)	"Sky Starts Falling" (2005)	"'Some Cities Live'" (2006)

Music video
- "Sky Starts Falling" on YouTube

"Sky Starts Falling" is the third and final single from English rock band Doves' third album, Some Cities (2005). It was released in the UK on 12 September 2005 on CD, DVD and 7-inch vinyl, and charted at number 45 on the UK Singles Chart. The B-sides include 2 different remixes of "Some Cities" by Echoboy and a remix of "The Storm" by unofficial fourth Doves band member Martin Rebelski.

== Track listings ==
All tracks are written by Jez Williams, Jimi Goodwin, and Andy Williams, except where noted.

Promo CD (HVN152CDRP)
No.	Title	Length
1.	"Sky Starts Falling"	4:06
2.	"Sky Starts Falling" (Instrumental)	4:06

UK 2-track CD (HVN152CD)
No.	Title	Length
1.	"Sky Starts Falling"	4:06
2.	"Some Cities" (Echoboy Remix)	2:46

UK DVD with fold-out poster (HVN152DVD)
No.	Title	Writer(s)	Length
1.	"Sky Starts Falling" (video)
2.	"The Storm" (Rebelski Remix)	Williams, Goodwin, Williams, Sakamoto	3:53
3.	"Some Cities" (Love Will Never Sever Mix by Echoboy)		10:30

UK limited edition 7-inch vinyl with fold-out poster (HVN152)
No.	Title	Writer(s)	Length
1.	"Sky Starts Falling"		4:06
2.	"The Storm" (Rebelski Remix)	Williams, Goodwin, Williams, Sakamoto	3:53

== Charts ==
Chart (2005)	Peak position
UK Singles Chart	45
