= Lindstrøm & Prins Thomas =

Norwegian electronica duo

Lindstrøm & Prins Thomas is a musical collaboration between Norwegian producers Hans-Peter Lindstrøm and Prins Thomas. Their style of music is often termed "space disco" with influences including electro, fusion, prog and krautrock.

== Discography ==
=== Studio albums ===
- Lindstrøm & Prins Thomas (2005)
- Reinterpretations (2007)
- II (2009)
- III (2020)

=== Singles and EPs ===
- "Further Into The Future" (2004)
- "Turkish Delight" (2005)
- "Mighty Girl" (2006)
- "Boney M Down" (2006)
- "Nummer Fire" (2007)
- "Tirsdagsjam" (2009)
