= Torgunn Flaten =

Norwegian singer/songwriter

Torgunn Flaten is a Norwegian, composersinger/songwriter. She was born in Gjøvik, a town in eastern Norway. She has lived in Oslo since 1995.

She has written and performed songs on the acoustic guitar since her late teens. Early on she played the flute, and joined both classical groups as well as jazz-bands. Her style of music is influenced by Jazz, Bossa Nova, Classical, Electronic, POP/Rock, Folk and Country music.

Torgunn Flaten composed the piece Normas Ark, for the television program “Arkitektens hjem”, NRK. Torgunn Flaten has worked with sound-recordings for television and documentaries within broadcast corporations like NRK Norwegian Broadcasting Corporation. You can hear an influence from Cinematic soundscapes or passages of atmospheric sounds in the music.

Lindström & Prins Thomas have rearranged some of her songs. "Run", one of these songs, is the only vocal (non-instrumental) track on their debut CD. In 2008 they collaborated on another song written by Torgunn Flaten, "Days of Joy", which comes from the EP with the same name.

Torgunn has studied arts and craft as well as media engineering for television and radio, with sound, photo, painting and drawing as main -topics.
