= Winter Hill (song) =

Single by Doves

from the album Kingdom of Rust
- B-side: "Brazil"
- Released: 20 July 2009
- Recorded: 2006–2009
- Genre: Indie rock
- Length: 3:44 (radio mix); 5:12 (album version)
- Label: Heavenly Records; Virgin Records/EMI
- Songwriters: Jez Williams, Jimi Goodwin, Andy Williams
- Producers: Doves, John Leckie

Doves singles chronology
"Kingdom of Rust" (2009)	"Winter Hill" (2009)	"Andalucia" (2010)

Music video
- "Winter Hill" on YouTube

"Winter Hill" is the second single from Doves' fourth studio album Kingdom of Rust. The single was released on 20 July 2009 via Heavenly Records. The song is one of three songs recorded during the album sessions produced by John Leckie (the other two being album track "10:03" and B-side "Push Me On"). The radio edit of "Winter Hill" features a new mix by David Bascombe. In a track-by-track discussion with NME, Doves said that the song is about Winter Hill near Bolton, and that the track had been "hanging around since Lost Souls but we've not worked on it before...it just kept knocking on our door." "Winter Hill" was released as a limited edition 7" vinyl single, with the exclusive new "Dylanesque" B-side "Brazil." Three limited edition 12" singles or two separate digital download-only sets feature exclusive remixes of "Jetstream" and "Compulsion" by Sasha, Hans-Peter Lindstrøm, and Andrew Weatherall. "Winter Hill" became the band's first single not to chart in the top 100 of the UK Singles Chart on its week of release. It does not appear on their 2010 best-of album The Places Between, although its video is included on the accompanying DVD.

The music video for "Winter Hill" premiered on 10 June 2009 and features stunt cyclist Danny MacAskill. The video was produced by Pulse Films and directed by David Mould, who previously directed the video for Doves' 2002 single "Caught by the River."

The B-side "Brazil" was remixed by Aeroplane in late 2009.

== Track listings ==
All tracks are written by Jez Williams, Jimi Goodwin, and Andy Williams.

Promo CD-R (no catalogue number)
No.	Title	Length
1.	"Winter Hill" (Radio Mix)	3:44
2.	"Winter Hill" (Instrumental)	5:12

UK 7" vinyl (HVN192)
No.	Title	Length
1.	"Winter Hill"	5:12
2.	"Brazil"	3:36

UK limited edition 12" No. 1 (HVN19212P1)
No.	Title	Length
1.	"Jetstream" (Sasha Remix)	8:42
2.	"Jetstream" (Sasha Subdub)	8:02

UK limited edition 12" No. 2 (HVN19212P2)
No.	Title	Length
1.	"Jetstream" (Lindstrøm Remix)	11:11
2.	"Jetstream" (The Time & Space Machine Remix)	7:59

UK limited edition 12" No. 3 (HVN19212P3; one-sided)
No.	Title	Length
1.	"Compulsion" (Andrew Weatherall Remix)	9:54

Digital download set No. 1
No.	Title	Length
1.	"Winter Hill" (Radio Mix)	3:44
2.	"Compulsion" (Andrew Weatherall Remix)	9:54
3.	"Jetstream" (Lindstrøm Remix)	11:11

Digital download set No. 2
No.	Title	Length
1.	"Winter Hill" (Acoustic)	4:49
2.	"Jetstream" (Sasha Remix)	8:42
3.	"Jetstream" (Sasha Subdub)	8:02

"Brazil" digital download
No.	Title	Length
1.	"Brazil" (Aeroplane Remix)	5:19

== Credits ==
- "Winter Hill" produced by Doves and John Leckie; mixed by Michael H. Brauer.
- "Winter Hill" (radio mix) mixed by David Bascombe.
- "Brazil" produced by Doves and Dan Austin; mixed by Dan Austin.
- "Jetstream" (Sasha Remix and Subdub) mixed by Sasha.
- "Jetstream" (Lindstrøm Remix) mixed by Hans-Peter Lindstrøm.
- "Jetstream" (The Time & Space Machine Remix) mixed by Richard Norris.
- "Compulsion" (Andrew Weatherall Remix) mixed by Andrew Weatherall.
- Sleeve design by Rick Myers.

== Charts ==
Chart (2009)	Peak position
UK Singles Chart	148
