= The Universal Want =

Studio album by Doves
- Released: 11 September 2020
- Recorded: 2017–2020
- Studios: Frank Bough Sound III (Cheshire); EVE (Stockport); The Big Red (Macclesfield); Vada Studio (Alcester)
- Length: 47:06
- Labels: Heavenly; Virgin
- Producers: Doves; Dan Austin

Doves chronology
The Places Between: The Best of Doves (2010)	The Universal Want (2020)	Constellations for the Lonely (2025)

Doves studio album chronology
Kingdom of Rust (2009)	The Universal Want (2020)	Constellations for the Lonely (2025)

Singles from The Universal Want
- 1. "Carousels" Released: 18 June 2020; 2. "Prisoners" Released: 9 July 2020; 3. "Cathedrals of the Mind" Released: 27 August 2020

The Universal Want is the fifth studio album by British rock band Doves. The album was released by Heavenly Recordings and Virgin/EMI on 11 September 2020. The Universal Want is the band's first album following a hiatus that began in 2010; the band members pursued solo projects in the interim.

Three digital singles preceded the album's release across mid-2020: "Carousels" in June, "Prisoners" in July, and "Cathedrals of the Mind" in August. The Universal Want garnered critical acclaim and was commercially successful, entering the UK Albums Chart at #1, becoming Doves' third album to achieve the top position.

It is the band's only album in which singer and bassist Jimi Goodwin sings lead vocals on every track, although guitarist Jez Williams sings co-lead vocals on "Mother Silverlake".

== Background ==
After touring and promotion of the band's previous album, Kingdom of Rust, and subsequent compilation album The Places Between: The Best of Doves in 2009 and 2010 respectively, Doves announced they would be taking an indefinite hiatus. Jimi Goodwin released his debut solo album, Odludek, in March 2014, while Jez and Andy Williams regrouped as Black Rivers and released a self-titled album in February 2015.

In December 2018, Goodwin and the Williams brothers announced they would be reuniting as Doves and performing at the Royal Albert Hall in support for the Teenage Cancer Trust in March 2019. Following the warm reception to the performance and additional live gigs, rumours began to circulate regarding new material being written and recorded. On 18 June 2020, the band released "Carousels", their first new song in ten years. A month later on 9 July, the band announced the details of their new album and released the album's first proper single, "Prisoners".

== Recording ==
Doves partly recorded the album at Frank Bough Sound III (a studio converted from a barn in Cheshire where they had recorded Kingdom of Rust), Big Red Studios in Macclesfield, EVE Studios in Stockport and Vada Studios in Alcester in England. The band co-produced the album with frequent collaborator Dan Austin, and it was mixed by Craig Silvey at London's Toast Studios and Dan Austin at SoundHorn Studios in southwest England.

In an interview with independent music website At the Barrier, Andy Williams said there was a renewed focus and clarity in the studio after not recording together for as long as the band did; he added, "[There was also] an appreciation of what all three of us brought to the band originally. We enjoy each other's company. We missed writing together and we also gave each other more room. If someone wasn't feeling great one day we'd reconvene at a later date whereas during Kingdom of Rust we were working solidly day-to-day; clocking in. It was quite militant. We've always had a strong work ethic but this time it was different because of the way we gave each other space if they weren't feeling it. It was a lot easier as a process."

The album's artwork was chosen by the band from London-based, Finnish photographer Maria Lax. Goodwin was moved by the images in Lax's 2020 photobook, Some Kind of Heavenly Fire, and he gifted his bandmates a copy each. This marks the first album release by the band to not feature artwork from longtime collaborator Rick Myers.

== Critical reception ==
Professional ratings
Aggregate scores
Source	Rating
AnyDecentMusic?	8.2/10
Metacritic	80/100
Review scores
Source	Rating
Clash	8/10
The Guardian	4/5 stars
Mojo	4/5 stars
MusicOMH	4/5 stars
NME	4/5 stars
Our Culture Mag	3.5/5 stars
Pitchfork	6.7/10
Q	4/5 stars
Uncut	9/10
Under the Radar	8/10

The Universal Want was met with critical praise. In the October 2020 issue of Uncut, reviewer Paul Moody awarded the album a 9 out of 10 rating, and praised the album as a "cathartic comeback from the kings of Northwestern noir" and concluded, "With their fifth album they're taking strength from sadness, hope from despair, and wisdom from experience. In troubled times, The Universal Want is exactly what we need." Reviewer Jonathan Taylor of British independent website Gigslutz gave the album a positive review, stating, "There is an autobiographical subtext and musically it encapsulates perfectly three decades of experience and ideas. This time around, devoid of pressure and breaking free from the shackles of expectation, Doves have produced a masterpiece of a record, which arguably could be considered their finest album to date." Along with positive reviews, both Stereogum and The Guardian awarded the album their "Album of the Week" tags for the week of the release date.

=== Accolades ===
In a year-end recap, independent music website Albumism ranked The Universal Want at number 10 on their list of the "100 Best Albums of 2020." Under the Radar ranked the album at number 12 on their "Top 100 Albums of 2020" list.

== Track listing ==
All tracks are written by Jez Williams, Jimi Goodwin, and Andy Williams (Note: "Carousels" features a drum sample written by Tony Allen.)

The Universal Want track listing
No.	Title	Length
1.	"Carousels"	4:50
2.	"I Will Not Hide"	4:15
3.	"Broken Eyes"	4:15
4.	"For Tomorrow"	5:28
5.	"Cathedrals of the Mind"	5:20
6.	"Prisoners"	4:26
7.	"Cycle of Hurt"	4:15
8.	"Mother Silverlake"	5:13
9.	"Universal Want"	5:21
10.	"Forest House"	3:43
Total length:		47:06

Japanese CD bonus tracks (Note: Bonus tracks originally released in 2002; reissued in 2020 on the band's digital download-only release Remnants II.)
No.	Title	Writer(s)	Length
11.	"There Goes the Fear" (Live acoustic)		4:40
12.	"M62 Song" (Four Tet Remix)	Williams, Goodwin, Williams, Fripp, Giles, Lake, McDonald, Sinfield	6:26
Total length:			58:09

Limited edition box set bonus 12" single track listing
No.	Title	Length
1.	"Carousels" (The Comet Is Coming Remix)	5:02
2.	"Carousels" (The Comet Is Coming Instrumental)	5:01
3.	"Carousels" (Instrumental)	4:54

== Credits ==
Doves

- Jimi Goodwin – lead vocals, bass (except tracks 5 and 9), acoustic guitar, percussion on "Mother Silverlake", programming, production
- Jez Williams – guitars, backing vocals, synthesiser, programming, co-lead vocals on "Mother Silverlake", bass (tracks 5 and 9), string arrangements (tracks 3, 6, 7), mixing, production
- Andy Williams – drums, percussion, backing vocals, keyboard on "The Universal Want", samples, production

Additional musicians

- Martin Rebelski – piano on tracks 1, 2, 4, 6, 8 and 9; modular synths on track 6
- Tony Allen – drums on track 1
- Dan Austin – programming
- Belinda Hammond and Hannah Groarke-Young – strings on tracks 3, 6 and 7
- Colin Williams, Kim Wedderburne, Mark Menzies, Se-ember Yaor and Yvonne Shelton – backing vocals on tracks 4 and 9

Technical

- Produced by Doves and Dan Austin, except tracks 1, 5 and 9 produced by Doves.
- Tracks 1, 2, 3, 4 and 8 mixed by Craig Silvey at Toast Studios; assisted by Dani Bennett Spragg.
- Tracks 2 and 4 additional mixing by Jez Williams.
- Tracks 6, 7 and 10 mixed by Dan Austin at SoundHorn.
- Tracks 5 and 9 mixed by Jez Williams for Cedar Music Productions.
- Engineered by Jez Williams and Dan Austin.
- Assistant engineers: Henry Broadhead and Joel Patchett (tracks 2, 4, 8 and 10); Jake Evans (track 3); George Perks (tracks 7, 9 and 10).
- Mastered by Matt Colton at Metropolis Mastering, London.

Visual

- Photography by Maria Lax.
- Band photo by Jon Shard.

== Charts ==
Chart performance for The Universal Want
Chart (2020)	Peak position
Australian Albums (ARIA)	83
Belgian Albums (Ultratop Flanders)	120
German Albums (Offizielle Top 100)	85
Irish Albums (Official Charts)	6
Scottish Albums (Official Charts)	1
Swiss Albums (Schweizer Hitparade)	65
UK Albums (Official Charts)	1

== Release history ==
Country	Date	Label	Format	Catalogue #	Notes
Various	11 September 2020	Heavenly/Virgin	CD	CDV3248	
Various	11 September 2020	Heavenly/Virgin	LP	V3248	
Various	11 September 2020	Heavenly/Virgin	Red-coloured LP	VY3248	Doves' webstore and online retail exclusive
Various	11 September 2020	Heavenly/Virgin	White-coloured LP	VX3248	Indie stores exclusive
Various	11 September 2020	Heavenly/Virgin	Limited edition box set	VBOX3248	Limited numbered box set with lenticular cover on lid; includes picture disc LP, bonus 12" single, cassette, art prints and postcards
Japan	11 September 2020	Universal Music Japan	CD	UICY-15922	Includes two bonus tracks
United States	9 October 2020	Heavenly/Virgin via Imperial Distribution	LP	V3248	
