= Real Life Is No Cool =

Studio album by Lindstrøm & Christabelle
- Released: January 18, 2010
- Genre: Electronic dance; space disco
- Length: 47:10 (standard edition); 89:45 (with bonus disc)
- Label: Feedelity, Smalltown Supersound
- Producer: Lindstrøm

Lindstrøm chronology
Where You Go I Go Too (2008)	Real Life Is No Cool (2010)	Six Cups of Rebel (2012)

Real Life Is No Cool is a 2010 album by Norwegian musician Hans-Peter Lindstrøm and Norwegian-Mauritian singer Christabelle. The Lindstrøm-produced album was released on January 18, 2010, in the UK and the following day in the United States, on the Oslo-based Smalltown Supersound label. The special edition of the album was released with a bonus disc, containing six remixes. An exclusive edition containing a second disc which featured Lindstrøm's disco version of the Christmas classic "Little Drummer Boy", was available only from the London record store Rough Trade's website. This edition of the album was released November 30, 2009. The album's title is taken from a lyric in the track "Keep It Up".

== Album history ==
Lindstrøm first met Christabelle (Isabelle Sandoo, then known as Solale) in 2001, while he shared studio time with her brother, DJ Dennis Jr. Lindstrøm listened to some of Solale's tracks, and got interested in collaborating with her. The first collaboration between Lindstrøm and Christabelle was the 12" titled "Music (In My Mind)" from 2003. Then in 2007, Lindstrøm released the 12" "Let's Practice" and the 10" "Let It Happen", which also featured Christabelle on vocals. These three tracks appeared at their first collaboration album, Real Life Is No Cool.

A collaborative album between the duo was planned since they first started working together, but did not materialized until 2010, due to Lindstrøm's hectic schedule. They began working on the album in 2008, before Lindstrøm released his debut studio album, Where You Go I Go Too. Following this album's critical success, a hype was created around Lindstrøm's music, fueled by an overwhelming interest from music magazines, blogs and clubs. In December 2009, Lindstrøm released his 42-minutes long version of "Little Drummer Boy". It sparked huge interest and was mentioned in countless music blogs, among others by Edmund Conway in The Daily Telegraph.

As stated by the duo on Norwegian television show "Lydverket", several of the songs were improvised in the studio. They also performed "Lovesick" at the show. Lindstrøm is known among music journalists for preferring to work in studio, rather than performing live. However, he and Christabelle went on tour in March 2010.

== Critical reception ==
Professional ratings
Review scores
Source	Rating
Allmusic	4.5 /5 stars
The A.V. Club	(A−)
The Guardian	4 /5 stars
No Ripcord	(7/10)
Pitchfork Media	(8.1/10.0)
PopMatters	(5/10)
Rolling Stone	3.0 /5 stars
Spin	3.5 /5 stars
URB	5 /5 stars

The album was met with generally favorable reviews by critics, and generated a score of 80/100 on the review calculator Metacritic. Several critics applauded Lindstrøm's new pop-oriented format, and his new take on disco, mixing Balearic beat, space disco, house and new wave. Christabelle's voice was described as "sexy and whispering" and Matthew Richardson in Prefix Magazine praised her contributions as being "alternately enthusiastic, aloof, earnest, and esoteric". Most critics highlighted the track "Baby Can't Stop", noting the similarity to Michael Jackson's 1982 hit "Wanna Be Startin' Somethin'" and his Thriller album. The collaboration between the two Norwegians was compared to Donna Summer and Giorgio Moroder's work together in the 1970s. Louis Pattison in BBC Music described the experimental penultimate track "Never Say Never" as a "...whirl of backwards beats, twinkling harps and discombobulated vocals that’s both utterly disorientating and quite delightful."

In an interview with XLR8R, Lindstrøm and Christabelle named the songs "Juicy Fruit" by Mtume, "Between the Sheets" by The Isley Brothers and "Computer Love" by Zapp & Roger as references for their work. They also said that they had tried to record a cover of the latter, without success, stating "maybe it's just too perfect".

== Chart history ==
Real Life Is No Cool debuted at #19 on the Norwegian album chart. The week after it fell to #39, before slipping out of the chart. The album did not manage to peak higher than Lindstrøm's debut album Where You Go I Go Too, which peaked at #11. "Lovesick" was released as a digital promo single at March 22, 2010. It performed well at the Belgian Singles Chart (Flanders), where it peaked at #12 and has stayed four weeks on the chart.

=== Chart positions ===
Chart (2010)	Peak position
Norwegian Albums Chart	19

"Lovesick"

Chart (2010)	Peak position
Belgian Singles Chart (Flanders)	12
Dutch Singles Chart	74

== Track listing ==
All songs written by Lindstrøm and Christabelle, except where noted.

1. "Looking For What" – 6:06
2. "Lovesick" – 3:12
3. "Let It Happen" (Vangelis, Dassin) – 4:53
4. "Keep It Up" - 3:28
5. "Music In My Mind" - 3:19
6. "Baby Can't Stop" - 6:11
7. "Let's Practise" - 5:42
8. "So Much Fun" - 4:55
9. "Never Say Never" - 3:08
10. "High & Low" - 6:21

=== Bonus disc ===
1. Baby Can't Stop (Aeroplane Vocal remix) - 7:24
2. Baby Can't Stop (Prins Thomas remix) - 9:29
3. Baby Can't Stop (Idjut Boys remix) - 7:32
4. Looking For What (Sally Shapiro remix) - 6:59
5. So Much Fun (Dølle Jølle remix) - 7:58
6. Lovesick (Fan Death rework) - 3:17

=== Exclusive Rough Trade edition ===
1. Little Drummer Boy - 42:42

=== Notes ===
- "Let It Happen" is a cover of track with the same name from the Greek electronic artist Vangelis' 1973 album Earth.
- "Lovesick" was used in a Cadillac CTS commercial in the United States in the spring of 2010.

== Personnel ==
- Christabelle Sandoo - vocals and songwriting
- Hans-Peter Lindstrøm - songwriting, electronics, recording and mixing.
- Marita Sørlie - additional vocals on "Baby Can't Stop"
- Eivind Lønning - trumpet on "Baby Can't Stop"
- Erik Johanessen - trombone on "Baby Can't Stop"
- Knut Sævik - horn arrangements, additional mixing and recording
- Kim Hiorthøy - artwork
