= Winter Hill air disaster =

1958 aviation accident

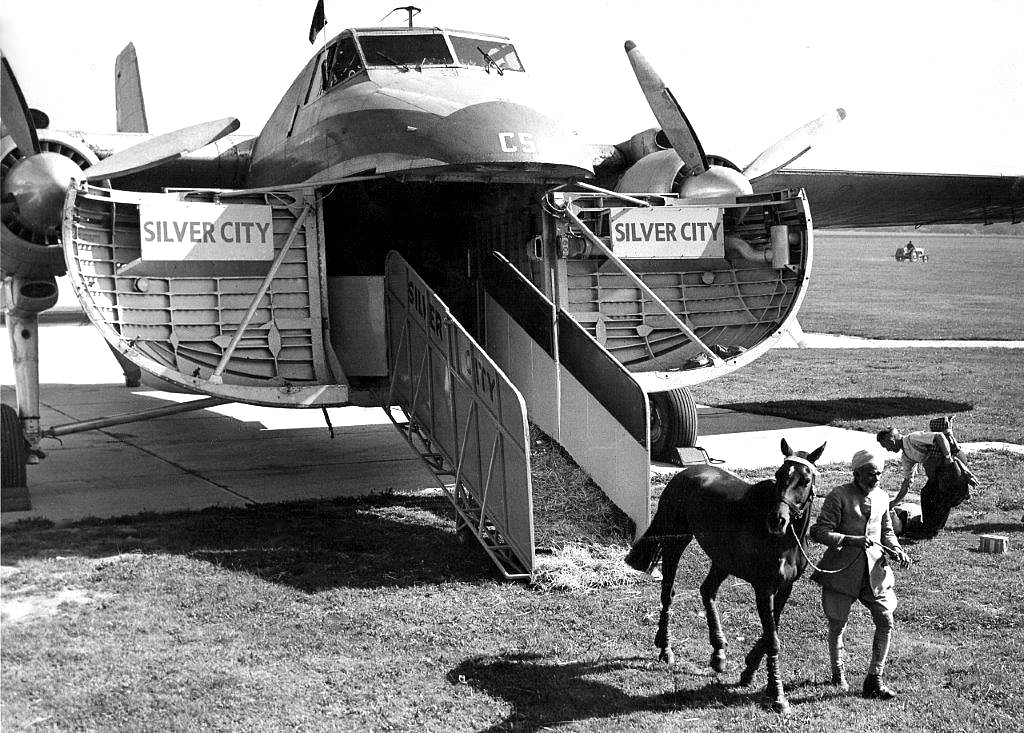
- G-AICS, the aircraft involved in the accident, seen in 1950

Accident
- Date: 27 February 1958
- Summary: Controlled flight into terrain
- Site: Winter Hill, England; 53.629°N 2.513°W

Aircraft
- Aircraft type: Bristol Type 170 Freighter
- Operator: Manx Airlines
- Registration: G-AICS
- Flight origin: Ronaldsway Airport
- Destination: Manchester Airport
- Occupants: 42
- Passengers: 39
- Crew: 3
- Fatalities: 35
- Injuries: 7
- Survivors: 7

The Winter Hill air disaster occurred on 27 February 1958, when the Silver City Airways Bristol 170 Freighter G-AICS, operated by Manx Airlines on a charter flight from the Isle of Man to Manchester, England, crashed during heavy snow into Winter Hill (also known as Rivington Moor), 5 miles (8.0 km) southeast of Chorley. Thirty-five people died and seven were injured; the cause was determined to be navigational errors.

== Background ==
The flight was a charter flight from Ronaldsway Airport, Ballasalla, on the Isle of Man, to Manchester Ringway Airport, operated by Manx Airlines with the Silver City Airways Bristol 170 Freighter G-AICS, call sign "Charlie Sierra". It was flying a group mostly consisting of people connected with the motor trade in the Isle of Man to visit the Manchester Exide Battery factory at Clifton Junction and the Manchester car show.

== Crash ==
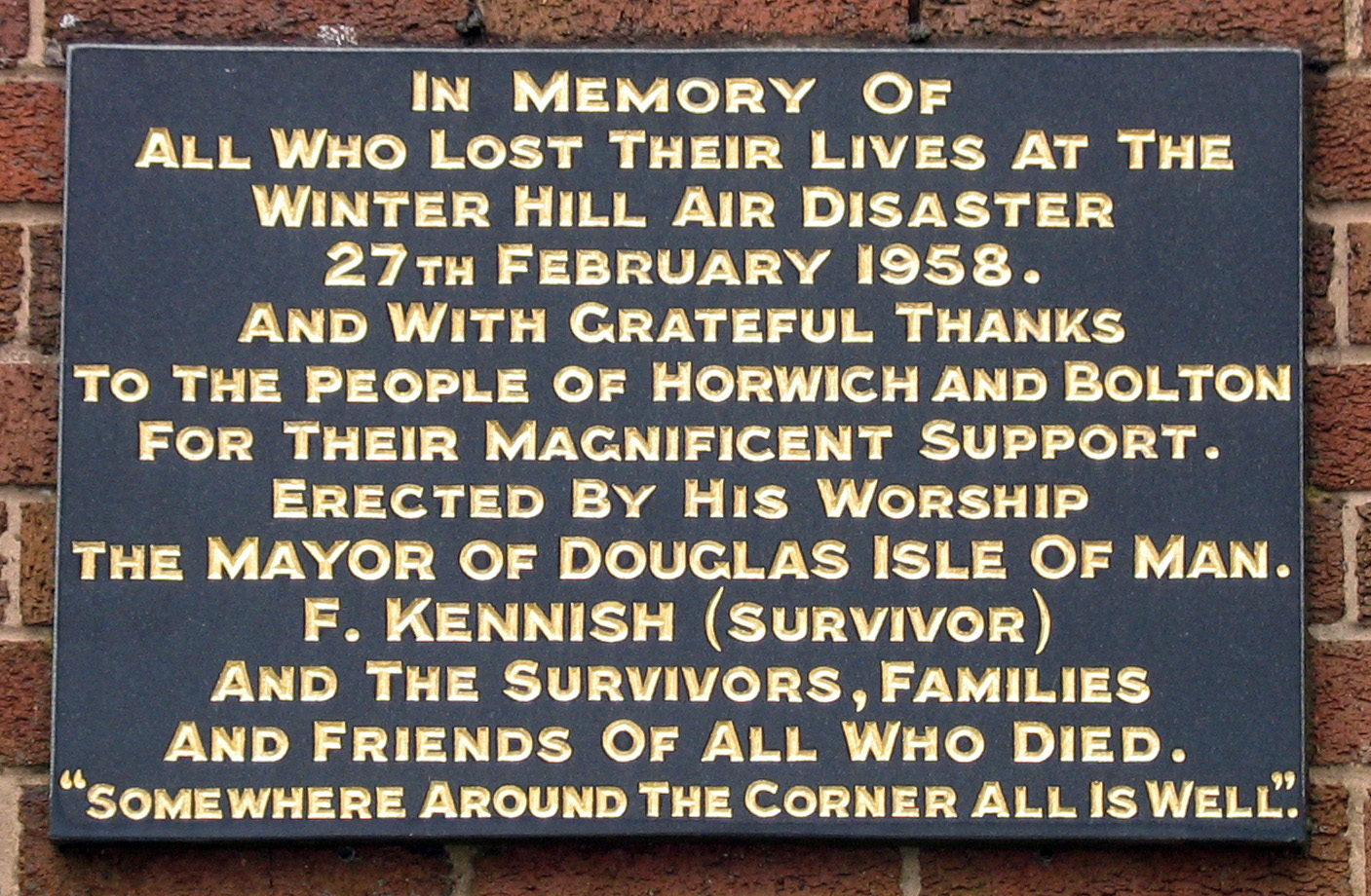
Memorial plaque at the crash site

The aircraft took off from Ronaldsway Airport with a crew of three—captain, first officer and stewardess—and 39 passengers, bound initially for an aircraft reporting point at Squires Gate, near Blackpool. Take-off was delayed by repairs to navigation equipment, and as a result because of other air traffic in the Manchester area, as well as poor weather in England, the captain was ordered to maintain an altitude of 1,500 feet (460 m) rather than climbing to the normal 3,500 feet (1,100 m). After receiving clearance from air traffic control at Manchester Ringway, the flight continued inland to Wigan Beacon, a non-directional beacon in the Manchester Zone, which transmitted a recognition signal of "MYK" in Morse code on a frequency of 316 kHz and a range of c. 25 miles (40 km).

While the captain was briefly absent from the cockpit, the first officer erroneously tuned the radio compass to the frequency for Oldham Beacon instead of Wigan Beacon; visibility was extremely poor and the mistake was first noticed by Manchester Control, who at 9:44 AM ordered an immediate right turn. Shortly afterwards, the aircraft crashed near the summit of Winter Hill, several hundred yards from the Independent Television Authority's Winter Hill transmitting station.

The weather was so severe that none of the engineers working at the transmitting station were aware of it until a survivor came to summon help. Several feet of snow hampered rescue efforts, and a snow cat vehicle had to be diverted from the A6 to cut a path for emergency vehicles, though the track had been cleared by people using spades previously.

== Passengers and crew ==
Thirty-five of the passengers were killed, one of whom died later from injuries. Seven people survived, including the three crew. As of February 2010, it was the worst high-ground air crash in the United Kingdom and the 11th-worst for number killed since 1950.

== Investigation ==
The probable cause of the accident was determined to have been the first officer's error tuning the radio compass, with the captain's failure to confirm the correct tuning as contributory cause. The inquiry also ascribed some blame to the air traffic controllers and to the design of the aircraft's cockpit, in which navigation displays were above and slightly behind the pilots' seats and therefore difficult to see.
