= Black and White Town =

2005 single by Doves

- Standard artwork

Single by Doves

from the album Some Cities
- B-side: "At the Tower"; "45"; "Eleven Miles Out"
- Released: 7 February 2005
- Length: 4:15
- Label: Heavenly
- Songwriters: Jez Williams; Jimi Goodwin; Andy Williams
- Producers: Doves; Ben Hillier

Doves singles chronology
"Caught by the River" (2002)	"Black and White Town" (2005)	"Live at Eden" (2005)

Music video
- "Black and White Town" on YouTube

Alternative cover
- UK CD2 artwork

"Black and White Town" is a song by English rock band Doves. The single was released on 7 February 2005 as the lead single from the band's third studio album, Some Cities (2005) and gave them their second top-10 hit, charting at No. 6 on the UK Singles Chart. The atmospheric single is noted for its heavy piano and guitars played in unison, with Andy Williams' percussion maintaining a driving beat.

== Reception ==
In 2026, Rolling Stone named "Black and White Town" the 96th-best rock song of the 21st century.

== Music video ==
The music video for "Black and White Town" was directed by Scottish film director Lynne Ramsay. It was filmed on the Summerston and Prospecthill Circus (Toryglen) council housing estates in Glasgow. There also exists a "director's cut" of the video, featuring different footage, which can be found on the DVD in the limited edition box set version of the Some Cities album.

== Track listings ==
All tracks are written by Jez Williams, Jimi Goodwin and Andy Williams except where noted.

UK CD1 and European CD single
No.	Title	Writer(s)	Length
1.	"Black and White Town"		4:23
2.	"At the Tower"	Williams, Goodwin, Williams, Lee Hazlewood	4:37

UK CD2
No.	Title	Length
1.	"Black and White Town"	4:23
2.	"45"	4:17
3.	"Eleven Miles Out"	4:32
4.	"Black and White Town" (enhanced video)

UK 7-inch single
No.	Title	Length
1.	"Black and White Town"	4:23
2.	"45"	4:17

== Charts ==
Chart (2005)	Peak position
Ireland (IRMA)	11
Scottish Singles Sales (Official Charts)	6
UK Singles (Official Charts)	6

== Certifications ==
Region	Certification	Certified units/sales
United Kingdom (BPI)	Silver	200,000^{‡}
^{‡} Sales+streaming figures based on certification alone.
