= Noon Hill (North West England) =

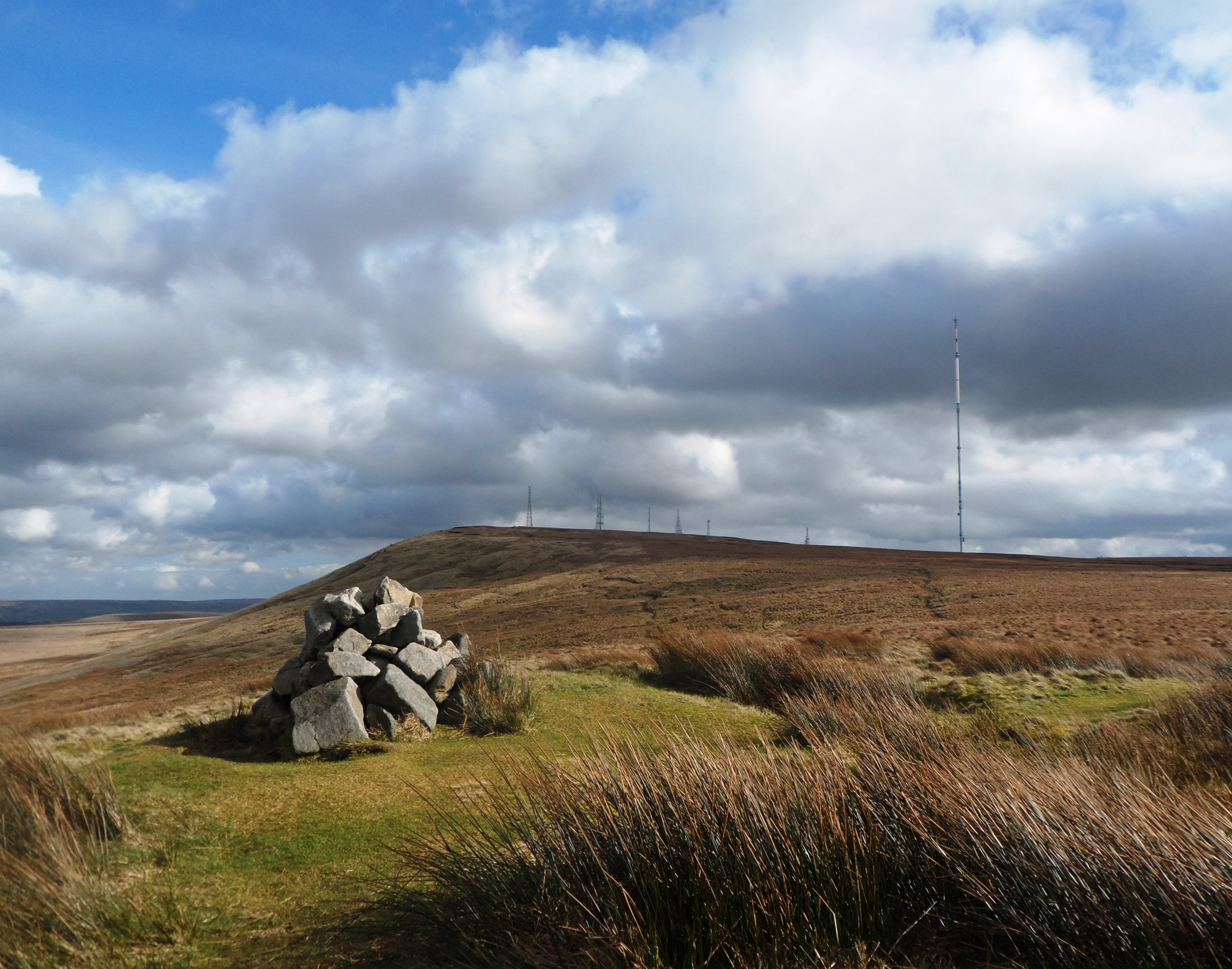
- Tumulus and cairn on Noon Hill, with Winter Hill in the background

Highest point
- Elevation: 380 m (1,250 ft)
- Parent peak: Winter Hill
- Listing: Marilyn
- Coordinates: 53°37′51″N 2°32′4″W

Geography
- Location within Lancashire Location within the Borough of Chorley
- Location: North West England
- OS grid: SD647150

Noon Hill is a hill on the border of the boroughs of Chorley, Blackburn with Darwen and Bolton, in North West England. It is located on Rivington Moor, Chorley and is 380 metres (1,247 ft) high. Part of the West Pennine Moors, it is a popular walking area, and is of significant historical interest. The summit of Noon Hill is home to a Bronze Age burial mound which is listed under the Ancient Monuments and Archaeological Areas Act 1979 as it appears to the Secretary of State to be of national importance.

== Bronze age burial monument ==
The burial monument, sometime known as the Noon Hill Saucer Tumulus is one of a pair of such burial mounds. The other being around 1 kilometre (1 mi) to the east, towards the summit of Winter Hill. The mound has been dated to around 1100 BC.

The monument on Noon Hill has been excavated twice, first in 1958 and then a second time in 1963/4 by Bolton and District Archaeology Society (now Bolton Archaeology and Egyptology Society). During these excavation, the remains of three cremated people were found. Those in charge of the excavation found that the remains were that of an adult male, an adult female and a child. These remains were "located beneath a collapsed enlarged food vessel and inserted into a central stone cist." In addition to these central cremations, the remains of several secondary cremations were found alongside flint tools including barbed and tanged arrowheads, scrapers and a sacrificial knife with one serrated edge and a sharp cutting edge. The archives for these excavations, reports and photographs are now online at the BAES Archives.

Despite the excavations in the 1950s and 1960s, the monument the round cairn on Noon Hill is believed to survive reasonably well. There is evidence of further interments and that the associated grave goods may still exist within the cairn and upon the old land surface beneath.

== See also ==
- Scheduled monuments in Lancashire
