= It's a Feedelity Affair =

Compilation album by Lindstrøm
- Released: October 23, 2006
- Genre: Italo disco
- Label: Smalltown Supersound STS126CD

Professional ratings
Review scores
Source	Rating
Allmusic	4 /5 stars
Pitchfork Media	(8.4/10)

It's a Feedelity Affair is a compilation of some of Norwegian producer's Lindstrøm's previously released Feedelity 12" recordings, along with a new single "The Contemporary Fix".

== Track listing ==
1. "Fast & Delirious" – 6:10
2. "Limitations" – 4:55
3. "Music (In My Mind)" – 4:50
4. "Cane It for the Original Whities" – 5:23
5. "There's a Drink in My Bedroom and I Need a Hot Lady" – 10:44
6. "Further into the Future" – 5:12
7. "I Feel Space" – 7:01
8. "Arp She Said" – 4:57
9. "Gentle as a Giant" – 4:56
10. "Another Station" – 8:53
11. "The Contemporary Fix" – 6:38
