= Snowden (song) =

2005 single by Doves

Single by Doves

from the album Some Cities
- Released: 9 May 2005
- Genre: Indie rock, post-Britpop, space rock
- Length: 4:12 (album version); 4:15 (Rich Costey Mix)
- Label: Heavenly
- Songwriters: Jez Williams, Jimi Goodwin, Andy Williams
- Producers: Doves, Ben Hillier, Rich Costey

Doves singles chronology
| "'Live at Eden'" (2005) | "Snowden" (2005) | "Sky Starts Falling" (2005) |

Music video
- "Snowden" on YouTube

Music video
- "Snowden" (live edit) on YouTube

Alternative cover
- Maxi-CD cover.

"Snowden" is the second single from British indie rock band Doves' third album, Some Cities (2005). It was released in the United Kingdom on 9 May 2005, charting at number 17 on the UK Singles Chart and number 42 on the Irish Singles Chart. The single version of the song was mixed by Rich Costey. Two music videos were produced for the song, directed by Dominic Leung. One features the album version of the song, and the other (also known as the "live edit") features the Rich Costey mix, with both videos featuring different footage.

B-side "Son of a Builder" contains elements of "Beasley Street," written by Mancunian performance poet John Cooper Clarke.

== Track listings ==
UK 2-track CD (HVN150CD)
| No. | Title | Writer(s) | Length |
|---|---|---|---|
| 1. | "Snowden" (Rich Costey Mix) | | 4:15 |
| 2. | "Son of a Builder" | Williams, Goodwin, Williams, Clarke, Hannett, Hopkins | 5:03 |

UK limited edition numbered CD with 4 art cards (HVN150CDS)
| No. | Title | Length |
|---|---|---|
| 1. | "Snowden" (Rich Costey Mix) | 4:15 |
| 2. | "Black and White Town" (David Holmes Remix) | 4:59 |
| 3. | "Almost Forgot Myself" (Doves vs. 69Corp Mix) | 4:53 |

UK limited edition numbered 7-inch vinyl (HVN150)
| No. | Title | Length |
|---|---|---|
| 1. | "Snowden" (Rich Costey Mix) | 4:15 |
| 2. | "Black Circus of Prague" | 2:28 |

== Charts ==
| Chart (2005) | Peak position |
|---|---|
| Ireland (IRMA) | 42 |
| Scotland Singles (OCC) | 14 |
| UK Singles (OCC) | 17 |
