= Hans-Peter Lindstrøm =

Norwegian producer (born 1973)

Lindstrøm
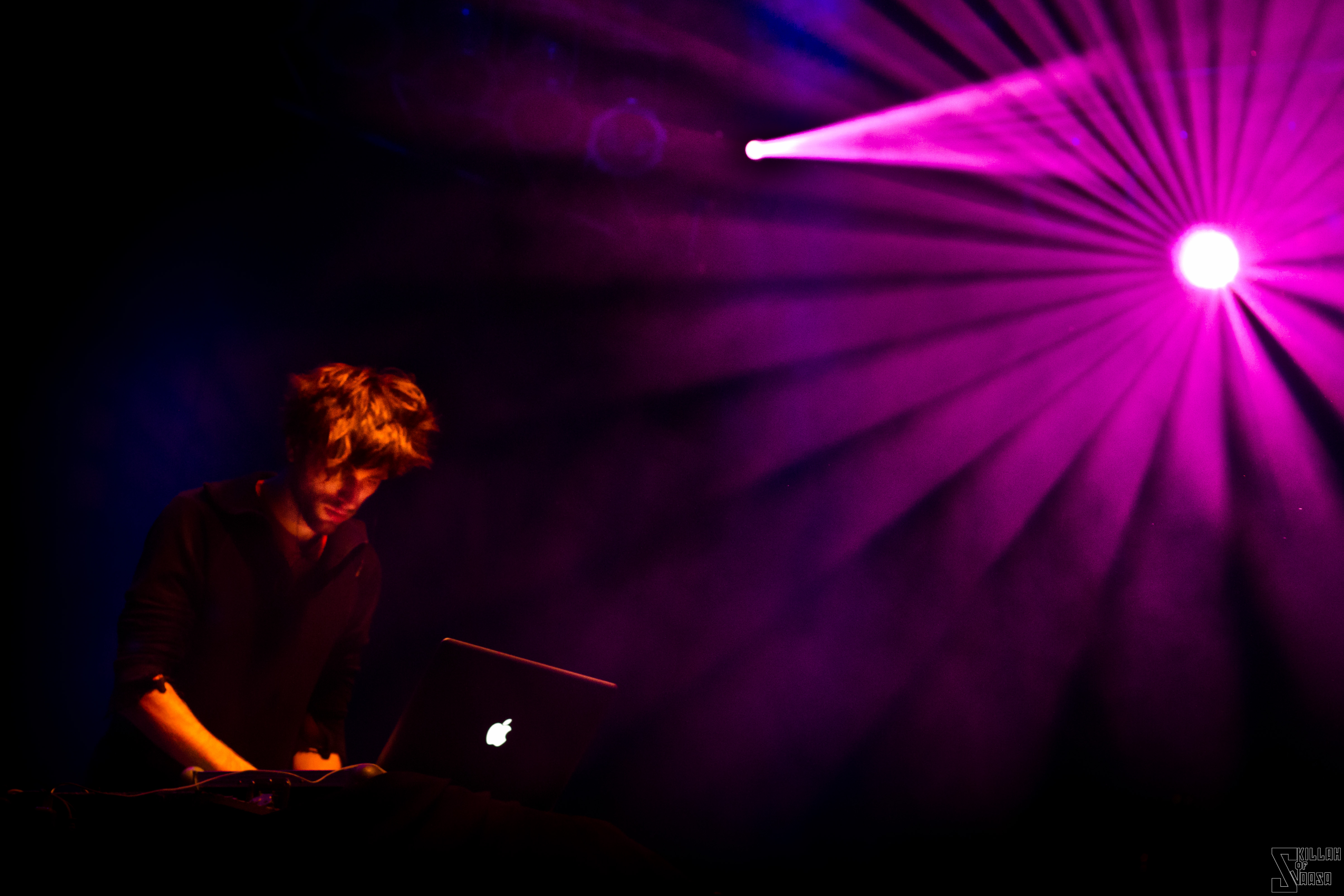
- Hans-Peter Lindstrøm (2011)

Background information
- Born: Hans-Peter Lindstrøm; 16 February 1973 (age 53); Flekkefjord, Norway
- Origin: Stavanger, Norway
- Genres: Electronic; nu-disco
- Years active: 2003—present
- Labels: Feedelity; Strømland Records
- Website: Lindstrøm & Feedelity Recordings

Hans-Peter Lindstrøm (born 16 February 1973) is a Norwegian music producer who works under the name Lindstrøm. He established the music label Feedelity in 2002. He often collaborates with fellow producer Prins Thomas (together constituting the musical group Lindstrøm & Prins Thomas). Lindstrøm won a Spellemannsprisen in 2008 for Where You Go I Go Too. He released a DJ mix album for the Late Night Tales compilation series on Azuli Records on 9 July 2007.

== Biography ==
Born in Flekkefjord, Norway on 16 February 1973 and raised in Stavanger, Hans-Peter Lindstrøm is a multi-instrumentalist, DJ and producer who goes by the name of "Lindstrøm".

Lindstrøm has over the years produced and released a number of EPs, albums and remixes. He often collaborates with other artists, such as collaborations with fellow producer Prins Thomas and singer Christabelle. Lindstrøm also works on remixes, having remixed artists including LCD Soundsystem, Roxy Music, Franz Ferdinand, Glasser and Best Coast. As a solo artist Lindstrøm has released four albums: It's a Feedelity Affair in 2006, Where You Go I Go Too in 2008, Six Cups of Rebel and Smalhans both in 2012.

Lindstrøm has been nominated for Spellemannsprisen (the Norwegian Grammys) four times and won three times. The first win was for his album It's a Feedelity Affair in 2006. He went on to receive the award for Where You Go I Go Too in 2008 and in 2010 he won the award with singer Christabelle for the album Real Life Is No Cool.

In March 2012 Lindstrøm released his fourth solo album titled Six Cups of Rebel, which for the first time in his career contains his own vocals. On 5 November 2012 Lindstrøm released his third solo studio album, Smalhans. After almost 4 years of silence, he released the single "Home Tonight" featuring Grace Hall, which was awarded 2nd place in Spin Magazines annual "Best Dance tracks" list in 2015. He spent the latter part of 2015 releasing a handful of official remixes, among them a remix of Anni-Frid Lyngstad's "Something's going on". He also took part in the collaborative album Runddans together with Todd Rundgren and Emil Nicolaisen, which was released on 5 May 2015.

On 9 March 2016 he premiered a brand new single on Zane Lowe's Beats 1 program via Apple Music. The single, titled "Closing Shot", was released worldwide on 11 March, and was subsequently featured on the EP Windings, released on 8 July 2016.

== Discography ==
Studio albums

- Where You Go I Go Too (2008, Smalltown Supersound)
- Six Cups of Rebel (2012, Smalltown Supersound)
- Smalhans (2012, Feedelity Music)
- It's Alright Between Us as It Is (2017, Smalltown Supersound)
- On a Clear Day I Can See You Forever (2019, Smalltown Supersound)
- Everyone Else Is a Stranger (2023, Smalltown Supersound)
- Sirius Syntoms (2025, Feedelity)

Collaboration albums

- Lindstrøm & Prins Thomas with Prins Thomas (2005, Eskimo)
- Reinterpretations with Prins Thomas (2007, Eskimo)
- II with Prins Thomas (2009, Eskimo)
- Real Life Is No Cool with Christabelle (2010, Feedelity)
- III with Prins Thomas (2020, Smalltown Supersound)

Compilations

- It's a Feedelity Affair (2006, Smalltown Supersound)

Mix albums

- Late Night Tales: Lindstrøm (2007, Azuli Records)

Singles and EPs

- (2000) Slow Supreme - Flesh / Granada [12" Jazid Collective]
- (2001) Slow Supreme - Green Tea [12" Jazid Collective]
- (2003) Lindstrøm - Untitled EP [12" Feedelity]
- (2003) Lindstrøm & Christabelle - Music (In My Mind) [12" Feedelity]
- (2004) Lindstrøm - There's a Drink in my Bedroom and I Need a Hot Lady EP [12" Feedelity]
- (2004) Lindstrøm Presents: Plague the Kid - EP [12" Bear Entertainment]
- (2004) Lindstrøm & Prins Thomas - Further into the Future EP [12" Feedelity]
- (2004) Lindbæk & Lindstrøm - Alien in My Pocket [12" Modal Music]
- (2005) Lindstrøm - Violent Group [10" Outergaze]
- (2005) Lindstrøm & Prins Thomas - Turkish Delight [12" Eskimo]
- (2005) Lindstrøm & Prins Thomas - E2E4 Tribute [Expanded]
- (2005) Lindstrøm Presents: Plague the Kid 2 - EP [12" Bear Entertainment]
- (2005) Lindstrøm - I Feel Space [12" Feedelity]
- (2005) Lindstrøm - Arp She Said [12" Feedelity]
- (2005) Lindstrøm - Another Side Of Lindstrøm [2x12" Outergaze]
- (2006) Lindstrøm - The Contemporary Fix [12" Feedelity]
- (2006) Lindstrøm & Prins Thomas - Mighty Girl [12" Eskimo]
- (2006) Lindstrøm & Prins Thomas - Boney M Down [12" Eskimo]
- (2006) Lindstrøm - Another Station [12" Feedelity]
- (2007) Lindstrøm & Prins Thomas - Nummer Fire EP [12" Eskimo]
- (2007) Lindstrøm - Let's Practise [12" Feedelity]
- (2007) Lindstrøm - Let It Happen [10" Azuli Records]
- (2007) Lindstrøm - Breakfast in Heaven [12" Feedelity]
- (2007) Lindstrøm - Days of Joy EP (feat. Torgunn Flaten) [ Feedelity]
- (2009) Lindstrøm & Prins Thomas - Tirsdagsjam [12" Smalltown Supersound]
- (2009) Lindstrøm - Leftovers EP [12" Smalltown Supersound]
- (2010) Lindstrøm - De Javu [Single Smalltown Supersound]
- (2012) Lindstrøm & Prins Thomas - Forever - Haim
- (2013) Lindstrøm & Todd Terje - Lanzarote (Olsen Records)
- (2014) Lindstrøm & Say Lou Lou - Games for girls
- (2015) Lindstrøm - Home Tonight (Ft. Grace Hall)
- (2015) Lindstrøm & Ronika - Didn't Know Betta
- (2016) Lindstrøm - Closing Shot [Single Feedelity]
- (2016) Lindstrøm - Windings (Feedelity/Smalltown Supersound)
- (2016) Lindstrøm & St. Lucia (musician) - TBA (TBA)

== Remixes ==
- (2004) Snuten - "Crazy B (Lindstrøm Remix)" [12" C+C Records/Hi-Phen]
- (2004) Fuzz Against Junk - "Country Klonk 2004 (Lindstrøm Remix)" [12" Bear Entertainment]
- (2004) Fenomenon - "Time (Lindstrøm Remix)" [12" Beatservice]
- (2004) Bermuda Triangle - "Secret Pillow (Lindstrøm Remix)" [12" Planet Noise]
- (2005) Tosca - "Züri (Lindstrøm & Prins Thomas Remix)" [12" G-Stoned]
- (2005) The Plastics - "Have You Ever Been (Lindstrøm Remix)" [No Phono]
- (2005) The Juan Maclean - "Tito's Way (Lindstrøm & Prins Thomas Remix)" [12" DFA/EMI]
- (2005) Silver City - "Down to 7 (Lindstrøm & Prins Thomas Remix)" [12" 2020 Vision]
- (2005) Port of Notes - "Walk Through Happiness (Lindstrøm Remix)" [12" Crue-l]
- (2005) Nemesi - "Cosmica (Lindstrøm & Prins Thomas Remix)" [12" Relish]
- (2005) Magnet - "Hold On (Lindstrøm Remix)" [12" Atlantic UK]
- (2005) LCD Soundsystem - "Tribulations (Lindstrøm Remix)" [12" DFA/EMI]
- (2005) Freeform Five - "Electromagnetic (Lindstrøm Remix)" [12" Fine]
- (2005) Diefenbach - "Make Up You Mind (Lindstrøm Remix)" [12" Wall of Sound]
- (2005) Chicken Lips - "Sweet Cow (Lindstrøm Remix)" [12" Kingsize]
- (2005) Answering Machine - "Call Me Mr Telephone (Lindstrøm & Prins Thomas Remix)" [12" Expanded]
- (2005) Annie - "The Wedding (Lindstrøm & Prins Thomas Remix)" [12" !K7]
- (2005) Anneli Drecker - "You Don't Have to Change" [EMI]
- (2005) Alden Tyrell - "Disco Lunar Module (Lindstrøm & Prins Thomas Remix)" [12" Clone]
- (2006) Telex - "Do Worry (Lindstrøm Remix)" [12" EMI]
- (2006) Roxy Music - "Avalon (Lindstrøm & Prins Thomas Remix)"
- (2006) Ilya Santana - "Oh Arpegissmo (Lindstrøm & Prins Thomas Remix)" [12" Modal]
- (2006) Franz Ferdinand - "I'm Your Villain (Lindstrøm Remix)" [12" Domino]
- (2006) Brennan Green - "Little Ease (Lindstrøm & Prins Thomas Remix)" [12" Chinatown]
- (2006) Allez Allez - "Allez Allez (Lindstrøm & Prins Thomas Remix)" [12" Eskimo]
- (2006) Alexander Robotnick - "Dark Side of the Spoon (Lindstrøm & Prins Thomas Remix)" [12" Creme Org]
- (2007) Imagination - "Just An Illusion (Lindstrøm Remix)" [12" Juno Records]
- (2008) Sally Shapiro - "Time To Let Go (Lindstrøm Remix)" [CD Paper Bag Records]
- (2008) Sally Shapiro - "Time To Let Go (Lindstrøm Remix)" [CD Paper Bag Records]
- (2008) Fjordfunk - "Let Our Spirits Go (Lindstrøm Remix)" [12" Luna Flicks]
- (2009) Boredoms - "Ant 10 (Lindstrøm Remix)" [CD Commmons]
- (2009) Doves - "Jet Stream" (Lindstrøm Remix) [Heavenly / EMI UK] 2008
- (2010) Glasser - "Mirrorage (Lindstrøm Remix)"
- (2010) Bear In Heaven - "Lovesick Teenagers (Lindstrøm Remix)"
- (2011) Best Coast - "Boyfriend (Lindstrøm Remix)"
- (2013) Grizzly Bear - "Gun Shy (Lindstrøm Remix)"
- (2013) Charli XCX - "You (Ha Ha Ha) (Lindstrøm Remix)"
- (2015) Foals - "Give it all (Lindstrøm Remix)"
- (2015) MS MR - "Painted" (Lindstrøm Remix)"
- (2015) Mark Ronson - "I Can't Lose (Lindstrøm Remix)"
- (2015) Anni-Frid Lyngstad- "I Know There's Something Going On (Lindstrøm Remix)"
- (2016) Norrlands Guld Ljus Alkoholfri - "Ljudet Av Ljus (Lindstrøm Remix)"
- (2016) Blossoms (band) - Charlemagne (Lindstrøm Remix)
- (2016) (Shura) - Nothing's Real (Lindstrøm & Prins Thomas Remix)
- (2016) (Cubicolor) - Fictionalise (Lindstrøm & Prins Thomas Remix)
- (2016) (Femme) - Fever Boy (Lindstrøm Remix)
- (2017) (Flume) - Tiny Cities Feat. Beck (Lindstrøm & Prins Thomas Remix)

Awards
| Preceded by Alog | Recipient of the Elektronika Spellemannprisen; 2006 | Succeeded by Salvatore |
| Preceded by Salvatore | Recipient of the Elektronika Spellemannprisen; 2008 | Succeeded by Röyksopp |
| Preceded by Röyksopp | Recipient of the Elektronika Spellemannprisen; 2010 | Succeeded by Biosphere |
| Preceded by Biosphere | Recipient of the Elektronika Spellemannprisen; 2012 | Succeeded by Ralph Myerz and the Jack Herren Band |
