= Pounding (song) =

2002 single by Doves

Single by Doves

from the album The Last Broadcast
- B-side: "Far from Grace"; "Northenden"; "Satellites" (remix); "M62 Song" (remix)
- Released: 17 July 2002
- Length: 4:44 (album version); 4:01 (radio edit)
- Label: Heavenly
- Songwriters: Jez Williams; Jimi Goodwin; Andy Williams
- Producer: Doves

Doves singles chronology
"There Goes the Fear" (2002)	"Pounding" (2002)	"Caught by the River" (2002)

Music video
- "Pounding" on YouTube

Alternative cover
- DVD single cover

"Pounding" is the second single from English band Doves' second studio album, The Last Broadcast (2002). The single was first released in Japan on 17 July 2002 as an extended play, coinciding with Doves' 2002 Japan tour dates. Five days later, the single was issued in the United Kingdom on 10-inch vinyl and CD, reaching number 21 on the UK Singles Chart on 28 July. The music video was directed by Julian House and Julian Gibbs at Intro, the same team that directed the band's previous video "There Goes the Fear."

B-side "Willow's Song" is found on the Japanese EP as the full-length version. It includes a 'false start' and runs 4:20. The version of the song found on the next single "Caught by the River" is an edit that cuts out the intro and runs 3:58.

The song was used in the Vancouver 2010 Winter Olympics With Glowing Hearts/Des Plus Brillants Exploits advertisement campaign and in pre-event intros.

== Track listings ==
All tracks are written by Jez Williams, Jimi Goodwin, and Andy Williams, except where noted.

UK CD single
No.	Title	Length
1.	"Pounding"	4:44
2.	"Far from Grace"	4:26
3.	"Northenden"	4:02
4.	"Pounding" (enhanced video)

UK DVD single
No.	Title	Writer(s)	Length
1.	"Pounding" (video)
2.	"Satellites" (Soulsavers remix)		5:04
3.	"M62 Song" (Four Tet remix)	Williams, Goodwin, Williams, Fripp, Giles, Lake, McDonald, Sinfield	6:26

UK 10-inch single
No.	Title	Writer(s)	Length
1.	"Pounding"		4:44
2.	"Satellites" (Soulsavers remix)		5:04
3.	"M62 Song" (Four Tet remix)	Williams, Goodwin, Williams, Fripp, Giles, Lake, McDonald, Sinfield	6:26

Japanese EP CD
No.	Title	Writer(s)	Length
1.	"Pounding"		4:44
2.	"The Cedar Room" (live Triple J at the Wireless)		7:29
3.	"Here It Comes" (live Triple J at the Wireless)		5:15
4.	"Valley"		4:23
5.	"Your Shadow Lay Across My Life"		3:45
6.	"Willow's Song" (full-length version)	Traditional	4:20

== Personnel ==
- Jimi Goodwin – lead vocals, bass guitar, programming
- Jez Williams – electric & acoustic guitars, backing vocals
- Andy Williams – drums, backing vocals

== Charts ==
Chart (2002)	Peak position
Europe (Eurochart Hot 100)	82
Scottish Singles Sales (Official Charts)	20
UK Singles (Official Charts)	21

== Release history ==
Region	Date	Format(s)	Label(s)	Ref.
Japan	17 July 2002	CD	Heavenly	
United Kingdom	22 July 2002	10-inch vinyl; CD	Heavenly	
