= Kingdom of Rust =

Studio album by Doves
- Released: 6 April 2009
- Recorded: 2006–2009
- Studios: Frank Bough Sound III, Cheshire; Green Gates, Eyam; Rockfield Studios, Monmouth, Wales; Moolah Rouge, Stockport
- Genre: Indie rock
- Length: 50:00
- Label: Heavenly
- Producers: Doves, Dan Austin, John Leckie

Doves chronology
Some Cities (2005)	Kingdom of Rust (2009)	The Places Between: The Best of Doves (2010)

Doves studio album chronology
Some Cities (2005)	Kingdom of Rust (2009)	The Universal Want (2020)

Singles from Kingdom of Rust
- 1. "Kingdom of Rust" Released: 30 March 2009; 2. "Winter Hill" Released: 20 July 2009; 3. "House of Mirrors" Released: 7 December 2009 (promo only)

Kingdom of Rust is the fourth studio album from British indie rock band Doves. The album was released on 6 April 2009 in the UK via Heavenly Recordings. Kingdom of Rust was met with generally positive critical acclaim, and entered the UK Albums Chart at number two. Two singles were released from the album: the title track, released a week prior to the album in March 2009, which charted at number 28 on the UK Singles Chart; and "Winter Hill", released in July 2009, which became the band's first single not to appear in that chart.

The album was born from a tumultuous time in Doves' history, and followed a four-year gap between their last album Some Cities in 2005, at the time the longest period between albums from the band. Doves would tour to promote the album throughout 2009, culminating in a recording hiatus in 2010 which would subsequently last until 2020.

== Production ==
The band recorded the album in a converted farmhouse barn in Cheshire, England over the course of 2006 through early 2009. Producer John Leckie, who has worked with Radiohead, The Stone Roses, and The Fall among others, was set to co-produce the entire album with the band, but was unable due to previous commitments. Instead, Leckie produced two tracks from the album—"Winter Hill" and "10:03" (as well as the B-side "Push Me On")—and the band worked with Dan Austin on the remaining nine songs. Tom Rowlands of the electronic music duo The Chemical Brothers also provided the song arrangement for "10:03".

The album was borne out of a strained writing and recording process. Between previous album Some Cities and Kingdom of Rust, vocalist/bassist Jimi Goodwin lost both of his parents, guitarist/vocalist Jez Williams split up from a girlfriend after seven years together, and all three band members suffered writer's block. "You'd think, 'Great, the amount of material I'll get from this' – but it went the opposite way. I couldn't concentrate on anything," Jez said in an interview with Simon Hattenstone of The Guardian. In the same interview, the band admitted that Kingdom of Rust became something of an "albatross" to finish, with the trio having been "obsessed over the idea that they were just repeating themselves": "If it sounds familiar, get rid [of it]," said Jez. "That was the golden rule."

== Release ==
The album was preceded by first single "Kingdom of Rust" on 30 March 2009. Doves also offered the album's lead track "Jetstream" as a free download on their website, starting from 28 January 2009. Regarding "Jetstream", the band mentioned being fans of the Vangelis score to Blade Runner, and wrote the song as "an imaginary song for the closing credits on Ridley Scott's classic." The German band Kraftwerk was another stated influence for "Jetstream". In an interview with NME, the band said "House of Mirrors" is "about your past haunting you." A documentary on the making of the album (produced by Soup Collective and directed by long-time Doves collaborator Matthew Norman), as well as a track-by-track discussion with Jimi and Andy, premiered exclusively on the official NME website in mid April 2009. The single "Kingdom of Rust" entered the UK Singles Chart at number 28, while second single "Winter Hill" became the band's first single to fail to enter the Top 100, peaking at number 148. A third single release for "House of Mirrors" was canceled.

In promotion for the album, Doves appeared on Later... with Jools Holland on 14 April 2009, performing "Kingdom of Rust", "Winter Hill", and "10:03". They later appeared on the American late-night talk shows Last Call with Carson Daly on 28 May 2009, which featured a pre-recorded video of the band performing "Kingdom of Rust" live at the Wiltern Theatre in Los Angeles on 16 May 2009, and then on Late Night with Jimmy Fallon on 5 June 2009, performing "The Outsiders".

The album is dedicated to Jimi Goodwin's father, Francis James Goodwin, who died on 23 December 2008.

In a 2010 interview discussing the band's first best-of compilation album The Places Between, Goodwin elaborated on the band's collective desire to take a break from recording and touring after Kingdom of Rust, a routine he described as an "album-tour-album-tour treadmill": "After Kingdom of Rust, we really do need to recharge the batteries in that respect... It's nice just to have a bit of breathing space. We just wanted to get off that whole album-tour-album-tour treadmill. None of us are ready to face going into the studio for another two years." The band then embarked on a recording hiatus, which subsequently lasted until 2020 and their fifth studio album The Universal Want.

== Reception ==
Professional ratings
Aggregate scores
Source	Rating
AnyDecentMusic?	7.6/10
Metacritic	77/100
Review scores
Source	Rating
AllMusic	4/5 stars
The A.V. Club	B+
The Guardian	4/5 stars
Mojo	4/5 stars
NME	8/10
Pitchfork	7.2/10
Q	4/5 stars
Rolling Stone	3/5 stars
Spin	3.5/5 stars
Uncut	4/5 stars

Kingdom of Rust was met with positive reviews. At Metacritic, which assigns a normalized rating out of 100 to reviews from mainstream critics, the album has received an average score of 77, based on 23 reviews. Both The Independent and Digital Spy awarded the album 5 out of 5 stars, Gigwise gave the album 4.5 out of 5 stars and noted that the album is "the most daring album of Doves' career to date," and The Observer noted in a glowing review that, "Previous albums never quite lived up to the band's facility for knockout singles, but this one holds the attention. There's a dreamy, addictive sadness to proceedings, their customary gruff melancholy now inflated to match the panoramic setting."

== Track listing ==
All tracks are written by Jez Williams, Jimi Goodwin, and Andy Williams.

No.	Title	Lead vocals	Length
1.	"Jetstream"	J. Williams	5:30
2.	"Kingdom of Rust"	Goodwin	5:11
3.	"The Outsiders"	Goodwin	3:28
4.	"Winter Hill"	Goodwin	5:18
5.	"10:03"	Goodwin	4:04
6.	"The Greatest Denier"	Goodwin	3:59
7.	"Birds Flew Backwards"	Goodwin	2:51
8.	"Spellbound"	Goodwin	5:39
9.	"Compulsion"	J. Williams	5:14
10.	"House of Mirrors"	Goodwin	4:20
11.	"Lifelines"	Goodwin	4:26

iTunes-only bonus tracks
No.	Title	Lead vocals	Length
12.	"Ship of Fools"	Goodwin	4:29
13.	"The Last Son"	Goodwin	4:49

Japan bonus track
No.	Title	Lead vocals	Length
12.	"Push Me On"	Goodwin	3:55

== Release history ==
Country	Date	Label	Format	Catalogue ref
Germany	3 April 2009	EMI	CD	5099969313424
United Kingdom	6 April 2009	Heavenly Recordings/Virgin Records	CD	HVNLP67CD
United Kingdom	6 April 2009	Heavenly Recordings/Virgin Records	Double LP (heavyweight vinyl; gatefold sleeve)	HVNLP67
United Kingdom	6 April 2009	Heavenly Recordings/Virgin Records	Digital download (two bonus tracks)	iTunes exclusive
United States	7 April 2009	Astralwerks	CD	5099969313424 (ASW 93134)
United States	7 April 2009	Astralwerks	Digital download (two bonus tracks)	iTunes exclusive
United States	21 April 2009	Heavenly/Virgin	Double LP (heavyweight vinyl; gatefold sleeve)	HVNLP67/ASW 96959 (same as UK pressing)
Japan	22 April 2009	Toshiba-EMI	CD (one bonus track)	TOCP-66879

== Instrumentals of Rust ==
On 15 June 2009, instrumental versions of all 11 tracks on the album were released as Instrumentals of Rust, exclusively to digital download outlets worldwide.

=== Track listing ===
1. "Jetstream" (Instrumental) – 5:32
2. "Kingdom of Rust" (Instrumental) – 5:13
3. "The Outsiders" (Instrumental) – 3:29
4. "Winter Hill" (Instrumental) – 5:20
5. "10:03" (Instrumental) – 4:05
6. "The Greatest Denier" (Instrumental) – 3:59
7. "Birds Flew Backwards" (Instrumental) – 2:54
8. "Spellbound" (Instrumental) – 5:42
9. "Compulsion" (Instrumental) – 5:16
10. "House of Mirrors" (Instrumental) – 4:18
11. "Lifelines" (Instrumental) – 4:25

=== Release history ===
Country	Date	Label	Format
Europe	15 June 2009	Heavenly Records	Digital download
North America	16 June 2009	EMI	Digital download

== Credits ==
=== Doves ===
- Jimi Goodwin – lead vocals, bass, guitars, backing vocals on "Jetstream" and "Compulsion"
- Jez Williams – guitars, backing vocals, lead vocals on "Jetstream" and "Compulsion", mixing on "10:03" and "House of Mirrors"
- Andy Williams – drums, percussion, backing vocals, harmonica on "The Last Son"

=== Additional musicians ===
- Martin Rebelski – piano (tracks 2, 5, 10-11)
- Belinda Hammond – first violin ("Kingdom of Rust" and "Birds Flew Backwards")
- Oliver Morris – second violin ("Kingdom of Rust" and "Birds Flew Backwards")
- Alexandra Fletcher – viola ("Kingdom of Rust" and "Birds Flew Backwards")
- Elinor Gow – cello ("Kingdom of Rust" and "Birds Flew Backwards")
- Baluji Shrivastav – dilruba on "Birds Flew Backwards"

=== Production ===
- Doves – production, mixing
- Dan Austin – production (except "Winter Hill" and "10:03"), engineering, mixing
- John Leckie – production ("Winter Hill" and "10:03")
- Adam Whittaker – additional engineering ("Winter Hill" and "10:03")
- Will Hensley – mixing assistant, Pro Tools
- Zac Froud – mixing assistant
- Michael H. Brauer – mixing
- Bob Ludwig – mastering
- Rick Myers – sleve design
- Deirdre O'Callaghan – band photo

== Charts ==
Chart (2009)	Peak position
Australian Albums Chart	34
Belgian Albums Chart	72
Canadian Albums Chart	79
Irish Albums Chart	8
UK Albums Chart	2
US Billboard 200	89
