= Prins Thomas =

Norwegian record producer (born 1975)

Thomas Moen Hermansen (born 17 February 1975), recording under the name Prins Thomas, is a Norwegian record producer and DJ often associated with collaborator Hans-Peter Lindstrøm as Lindstrøm & Prins Thomas.

== Musical style and career ==
Their music has been described as "space disco", and influences include electro, krautrock, psychedelia and prog. Their records include the album Lindstrøm & Prins Thomas, released in 2005 on the Eskimo Recordings label, and Reinterpretations, a compilation of remixes and unreleased versions of tracks from the album. The duo have released a second album, Lindstrøm & Prins Thomas II. Hermansen released his fourth album Principe Del Norte on February 19, 2016.

== Discography ==
- 2009: Mammut
- 2010: Prins Thomas
- 2012: Prins Thomas II
- 2014: Prins Thomas III
- 2016: Principe Del Norte
- 2017: Prins Thomas 5
- 2019: Ambitions
- 2020: Træns
- 2022: 8
- 2022: 9
- 2025: Thomas Moen Hermansen

== Other information ==
Prins Thomas' label, Full Pupp, also features similar-sounding artists such as Blackbelt Andersen and Todd Terje.
