= Liam Gallagher discography =

Discography of English singer Liam Gallagher

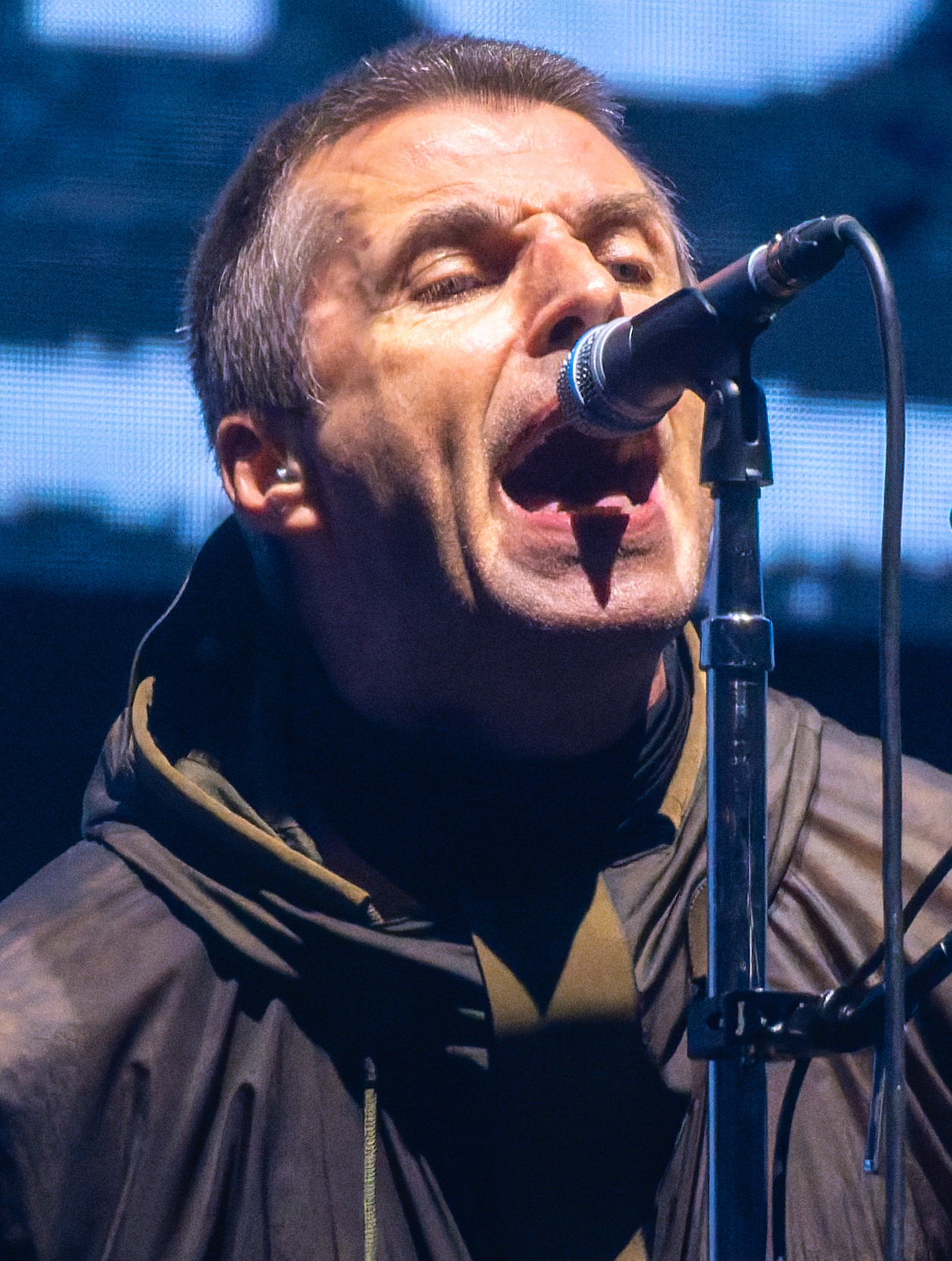
- Gallagher performing with Oasis in July 2025
- Studio albums: 4
- EPs: 2
- Live albums: 3
- Singles: 22
- Video albums: 1

The discography of Liam Gallagher, an English singer from Manchester, consists of four studio albums, three live albums, one videos, two extended plays and twenty-two singles.

All three of Gallagher's studio albums have reached number 1 on the UK Album Charts. His debut solo album, As You Were, was released in 2017; as of 2018, the album has sold over 300,000 copies in that country. His second studio album, Why Me? Why Not., was released in 2019. C'mon You Know, Gallagher's third studio album, was released in 2022. The singer's fourth studio album, a collaboration with Stone Roses musician John Squire, Liam Gallagher & John Squire, released on 1 March 2024.

== Albums ==
=== Studio albums ===
List of studio albums, with selected chart positions and certifications shown
Title	Details	Peak chart positions										Sales	Certifications
Title	Details	UK	AUS	BEL (FL)	FRA	IRE	ITA	NL	NZ	SCO	US	Sales	Certifications
As You Were	Released: 6 October 2017; Label: Warner Bros.; Format: CD, LP, digital download, streaming	1	9	13	24	1	4	15	13	1	30	UK: 400,000	BPI: Platinum; IRMA: Gold
Why Me? Why Not.	Released: 20 September 2019; Label: Warner; Format: CD, LP, digital download, streaming	1	7	8	17	2	5	20	34	1	— (Note: Why Me? Why Not. did not enter the US Billboard 200, but peaked at number 21 on the US Billboard Top Album Sales Chart.)		BPI: Gold
C'mon You Know	Released: 27 May 2022; Label: Warner; Format: CD, LP, digital download, streaming	1	5	19	20	2	15	12	9	1	— (Note: C'mon You Know did not enter the US Billboard 200, but peaked at number 16 on the US Billboard Top Album Sales Chart.)		BPI: Gold
Liam Gallagher John Squire	Released: 1 March 2024; Label: Warner; Format: CD, LP, digital download, streaming	1	65	38	20	1	7	84	32	1	—		BPI: Silver
"—" denotes album did not chart in that territory.

Video Album 2019: As It Was (UK: Gold)

=== Live albums ===
List of live albums, with selected chart positions shown
Title	Details	Peak chart positions									
Title	Details	UK	AUS	BEL (FL)	FRA	GER	IRE	ITA	NL	SCO	US Sales
MTV Unplugged (Live at Hull City Hall)	Released: 12 June 2020; Label: Warner; Format: CD, LP, digital download, streaming	1	50	26	45	8	1	11	34	1	34
Down by the River Thames	Released: 27 May 2022; Label: Warner; Format: CD, LP, digital download, streaming	4	94	87	91	18	19	78	— (Note: "Down by the River Thames" did not enter the Netherlands' Single Top 100 but peaked on the Netherlands' Vinyl Chart at number 19.)	2	59
Knebworth 22	Released: 11 August 2023; Label: Warner; Format: CD, LP, digital download, streaming	1	—	96	75	17	24	92	—	1	—
"—" denotes album did not chart in that territory.

== Extended plays ==
Title	Details	Peak chart positions			
Title	Details	UK	CRO	IRE	SCO
Acoustic Sessions	Released: 31 January 2020; Label: Warner; Format: LP, digital download, streaming	24	19	78	9
Diamond in the Dark	Released: 29 July 2022; Label: Warner; Format: Digital download, streaming	—	—	—	—
"—" denotes album did not chart in that territory.

== Singles ==
=== As lead artist ===
List of singles as lead artist, with selected chart positions shown
Title	Year	Peak chart positions										Certifications	Album
Title	Year	UK	BEL (FL) Tip	BEL (WA) Tip	CAN DL	EU	FRA	HUN	IRE	SCO	SK	Certifications	Album
"Carnation" (with Steve Cradock)	1999	6	—	—	—	—	—	—	—	6	—		Fire and Skill: The Songs of the Jam
"Wall of Glass"	2017	21	27	44	—	11	148	35	82	5	—	BPI: Platinum	As You Were
"Chinatown"	2017	56	—	—	—	—	—	—	—	32	—	BPI: Silver	As You Were
"For What It's Worth"	2017	33	32	30	—	—	—	—	91	19	—	BPI: Gold	As You Were
"Greedy Soul"	2017	56	—	—	—	—	—	—	—	63	—		As You Were
"Come Back to Me"	2017	— (Note: "Come Back to Me" did not enter the UK Singles Chart, but peaked at number 94 on the Official Audio Streaming Chart Top 100.)	35	—	—	—	—	—	—	78	—		As You Were
"Shockwave"	2019	22	— (Note: "Shockwave" did not enter the Flanders Ultratop 50, but charted as an "extra tip" on the Flanders Ultratip chart.)	— (Note: "Shockwave" did not enter the Wallonie Ultratop 50, but charted as an "extra tip" on the Wallonie Ultratip chart.)	—	9	—	23	57	1	—	BPI: Silver	Why Me? Why Not.
"The River"	2019	— (Note: "The River" did not enter the UK Singles Chart, but peaked at number 66 on the Official Singles Sales Chart Top 100.)	—	—	—	—	—	—	—	56	—		Why Me? Why Not.
"Once"	2019	49	38	— (Note: "Once" did not enter the Wallonie Ultratop 50, but charted as an "extra tip" on the Wallonie Ultratip chart.)	—	—	—	—	76	13	—	BPI: Gold	Why Me? Why Not.
"One of Us"	2019	50	—	31	—	—	—	—	90	9	—	BPI: Silver	Why Me? Why Not.
"Now That I've Found You"	2019	61	— (Note: "Now That I've Found You" did not enter the Flanders Ultratop 50, but charted as an "extra tip" on the Flanders Ultratip chart.)	— (Note: "Now That I've Found You" did not enter the Wallonie Ultratop 50, but charted as an "extra tip" on the Wallonie Ultratip chart.)	—	—	—	—	83	42	83		Why Me? Why Not.
"All You're Dreaming Of"	2020	24	— (Note: "All You're Dreaming Of" did not enter the Flanders Ultratop 50, but charted as an "extra tip" on the Flanders Ultratip chart.)	— (Note: "All You're Dreaming Of" did not enter the Wallonie Ultratop 50, but charted as an "extra tip" on the Wallonie Ultratip chart.)	—	2	—	4	91	—	—		Non-album single
"Everything's Electric"	2022	18	—	—	46	—	—	—	44	—	—	BPI: Silver	C'mon You Know
"C'mon You Know"	2022	— (Note: "C'mon You Know" did not enter the UK Singles Chart, but peaked at number 26 on the Official Singles Sales Chart Top 100.)	—	—	—	—	—	—	—	—	—		C'mon You Know
"Better Days"	2022	— (Note: "Better Days" did not enter the UK Singles Chart, but peaked at number 32 on the Official Singles Sales Chart Top 100.)	—	—	—	—	—	—	—	—	—		C'mon You Know
"Diamond in the Dark"	2022	65	—	—	—	—	—	—	—	—	—		C'mon You Know
"Too Good for Giving Up"	2022	— (Note: "Too Good For Giving Up" did not enter the UK Singles Chart, but peaked at number 87 on the Official Singles Sales Chart Top 100.)	—	—	—	—	—	—	—	—	—		C'mon You Know
"Just Another Rainbow" (with John Squire)	2024	16	—	—	—	—	—	—	76	—	—		Liam Gallagher & John Squire
"Mars to Liverpool" (with John Squire)	2024	— (Note: "Mars to Liverpool" did not enter the UK Singles Chart Top 100 but debuted and peaked at number 16 on the UK Singles Downloads Chart Top 100.)	—	—	—	—	—	—	—	—	—		Liam Gallagher & John Squire
"—" denotes a recording that did not chart or was not released in that territory.

=== As featured artist ===
List of singles as featured artist, with selected chart positions shown
Title	Year	Peak chart positions				Album
Title	Year	UK	IRE	ITA	SCO	Album
"Scorpio Rising" (Death in Vegas feat. Liam Gallagher)	2002	14	31	30	12	Scorpio Rising
"C'mon People (We're Making It Now)" (Don't Stop Now Mix) (Richard Ashcroft feat. Liam Gallagher)	2021	—	—	—	—	Acoustic Hymns Vol 1
"—" denotes a recording that did not chart or was not released in that territory.

== Other charted songs ==
Title	Year	Peak chart positions			Album
Title	Year	UK	BEL (WA) Tip	MEX Ing.	Album
"Bold"	2017	60	—	—	As You Were
"Paper Crown"	2017	— (Note: "Paper Crown" did not enter the UK Singles Chart, but peaked at number 80 on the Official Audio Streaming Chart Top 100.)	40	—	As You Were
"When I'm in Need"	2017	— (Note: "When I'm in Need" did not enter the UK Singles Chart, but peaked at number 99 on the Official Audio Streaming Chart Top 100.)	—	—	As You Were
"You Better Run"	2017	—	—	40	As You Were
"Sad Song"	2020	—	— (Note: "Sad Song" did not enter the Wallonie Ultratop 50, but charted as an "extra tip" on the Wallonie Ultratip chart.)	—	MTV Unplugged (Live at Hull City Hall)
"Champagne Supernova"	2020	—	— (Note: "Champagne Supernova" did not enter the Wallonie Ultratop 50, but charted as an "extra tip" on the Wallonie Ultratip chart.)	—	MTV Unplugged (Live at Hull City Hall)
"—" denotes a recording that did not chart or was not released in that territory.

== Session work ==
Title	Year	Album(s)	Artist	Notes
"History"	1995	A Northern Soul	The Verve	Handclaps
"Love Me and Leave Me"	1997	Do It Yourself	The Seahorses	Co-wrote with John Squire
"Come On"	1997	Urban Hymns	The Verve	Backing vocals
"Space & Time"	1997	Urban Hymns	The Verve	Handclaps
"Nothing Lasts Forever"	1997	Evergreen	Echo & the Bunnymen	Backing vocals
"Shoot Down"	2004	Always Outnumbered, Never Outgunned	The Prodigy	Vocals
"C'mon People (We're Making It Now)"	2021	Acoustic Hymns Vol. 1	Richard Ashcroft	Co-lead vocals

== Music videos ==
Title	Year	Director(s)
"Wall of Glass"	2017	Francois Rousselet
"Chinatown"	2017	Charlie Lightening
"Come Back to Me"	2017	Shane Meadows
"Paper Crown"	2018	Mat Whitecross
"I've All I Need"	2018	Dave Fudge
"Shockwave"	2019	Francois Rousselet
"The River"	2019	Unknown
"One of Us"	2019	Anthony Byrne; Steven Knight
"Once"	2020	Charlie Lightening
"All You're Dreaming Of"	2020	Anthony Byrne
"Everything’s Electric"	2022	Charlie Lightening
"Better Days"	2022	Paul Dugdale
"Too Good For Giving Up"	2022	Ryan Vernava; Liam Achaïbou
"Just Another Rainbow"	2024	Charles Mehling
"Mars to Liverpool"	2024	Unknown
"Raise Your Hands"	2024	Unknown
