= Knebworth 22 =

Live album by Liam Gallagher
- Released: 11 August 2023
- Recorded: 3–4 June 2022
- Venue: Knebworth Festival, England
- Length: 76:14
- Label: Warner

Liam Gallagher chronology
Down by the River Thames (2022)	Knebworth 22 (2023)	Liam Gallagher John Squire (2024)

Knebworth 22 is the third live album by English singer and songwriter Liam Gallagher, released on 11 August 2023 by Warner Records. The album was recorded during the first of Gallagher's concerts at the Knebworth Festival on 3 and 4 June 2022 which were attended by 170,000 people across both nights. Nine of the tracks were originally recorded by Oasis. A film of the same name directed by Toby L was released in cinemas in November 2022 and on Paramount+ in December 2022. A video for "Roll It Over" was released along with the album's announcement.

The album became Gallagher's fifth solo number one album in the United Kingdom.

== Critical reception ==
Professional ratings
Review scores
Source	Rating
Clash	8/10
The Guardian	4/5 stars
Hot Press	7/10
Retropop Magazine	4/5 stars

Emma Harrison of Clash found that Knebworth 22 "showcases not only [Gallagher's] fantastic vocals but his charismatic stage presence too", calling it "a gargantuan celebration of a tour de force performance". Reviewing the album for The Guardian, Kitty Empire opined that "if some of Gallagher's solo tracks fare less well – 'Paper Crown' is a lull – there is nothing but joy for the Oasis classics" like "Cigarettes & Alcohol". Robin Boardman of Louder Than War remarked that the production is "perfect with crystal-clear sound but without the sense that it's been polished to within an inch of its life in the studio. Is there anything new here? Well not really, but this is a well-presented and enjoyable album full of fantastic songs".

Edwin McFee of Hot Press wrote that it is "exhilarating from start to finish" and the performance of "Wall of Glass" "re-affirms that Gallagher still has star power by the boat-load". Retropop Magazine stated that Gallagher "sound[s] better than ever" and is "in fine form vocally with a presence that commands attention and proves him as one of Britain's all-time greatest rock showmen", and the album "a stellar display from one of the premier rock stars of a generation".

== Track listing ==
Knebworth 22 track listing
No.	Title	Writer(s)	Length
1.	"Hello"	Noel Gallagher; Gary Glitter; Mike Leander	3:32
2.	"Rock 'n' Roll Star"	N. Gallagher	4:48
3.	"Wall of Glass"	Liam Gallagher; Greg Kurstin; Andrew Wyatt; Andrew Sidney Fox; Michael Tighe	3:41
4.	"Shockwave"	L. Gallagher; Kurstin; Wyatt	3:36
5.	"Everything's Electric"	L. Gallagher; Kurstin; Dave Grohl; Friedrich Kunath	3:45
6.	"Roll It Over"	N. Gallagher	6:08
7.	"Slide Away"	N. Gallagher	6:01
8.	"More Power"	L. Gallagher; Wyatt	4:56
9.	"C'mon You Know"	L. Gallagher	5:08
10.	"The River"	L. Gallagher; Wyatt	3:23
11.	"Once"	L. Gallagher; Wyatt	3:56
12.	"Cigarettes & Alcohol"	N. Gallagher	4:01
13.	"Some Might Say"	N. Gallagher	5:10
14.	"Supersonic"	N. Gallagher	5:01
15.	"Wonderwall"	N. Gallagher	4:40
16.	"Champagne Supernova"	N. Gallagher	8:28
Total length:			76:14

Japanese edition bonus disc
No.	Title	Writer(s)	Length
17.	"Stand by Me"	N. Gallagher	6:10
18.	"Diamond in the Dark"	L. Gallagher; Wyatt; Tighe	3:35
Total length:			85:59

== Personnel ==
- Liam Gallagher - lead vocals
- Jay Mehler - guitar
- Barrie Cadogan - guitar
- John Squire - guitar (track 16)
- Drew McConnell - bass, backing vocals
- Dan McDougall - drums
- Gene Gallagher - drums (track 10)
- Christian Madden - keyboards
- Clive Mellor - harmonica (tracks 3–4, 9)
- Frida Touray, Holly Quin-Ankrah, Jodie Scantlebury - backing vocals

== Charts ==
Chart performance for Knebworth 22
Chart (2023)	Peak position
Austrian Albums (Ö3 Austria)	64
Belgian Albums (Ultratop Flanders)	96
Belgian Albums (Ultratop Wallonia)	14
French Albums (SNEP)	75
German Albums (Offizielle Top 100)	17
Hungarian Physical Albums (MAHASZ)	11
Irish Albums (IRMA)	24
Italian Albums (FIMI)	92
Japanese Albums (Oricon)	33
Japanese Digital Albums (Oricon)	35
Japanese Hot Albums (Billboard Japan)	42
Scottish Albums (OCC)	1
Spanish Albums (Promusicae)	82
Swiss Albums (Schweizer Hitparade)	28
UK Albums (OCC)	1

== See also ==
- Knebworth 1996, a 2021 live album of Oasis' concerts at Knebworth in August 1996
