= MTV Unplugged (Live at Hull City Hall) =

Live album by Liam Gallagher
- Released: 12 June 2020
- Recorded: 3 August 2019
- Venue: Hull City Hall (Hull, England)
- Length: 43:30
- Label: Warner

Liam Gallagher chronology
Why Me? Why Not. (2019)	MTV Unplugged (Live at Hull City Hall) (2020)	C'mon You Know (2022)

MTV Unplugged (Live at Hull City Hall) is a live album by English singer and songwriter Liam Gallagher. It was released on 12 June 2020 by Warner Records. It was originally set for release on 24 April 2020 but was delayed until June due to the COVID-19 pandemic. The album was recorded at Hull City Hall on 3 August 2019, consisting of 10 live acoustic performances of solo material by Gallagher and Oasis that were culled from the 15 songs which were performed on the night, including a cover of "Natural Mystic" by Bob Marley and the Wailers that was ultimately not included on the album.

MTV Unplugged (Live at Hull City Hall) is the first live release to top the UK Albums Chart since George Michael's Symphonica in 2014, and is the biggest selling vinyl release of 2020.

== Critical reception ==
Professional ratings
Aggregate scores
Source	Rating
Metacritic	73/100
Review scores
Source	Rating
AllMusic	3/5 stars
Clash	8/10
NME	4/5 stars
Pitchfork	5.9/10
Q	4/5 stars

MTV Unplugged (Live at Hull City Hall) received generally favourable reviews from music critics. At Metacritic, which assigns a weighted average rating out of 100 to reviews from mainstream publications, the album has an average score of 73, based on 10 reviews, indicating "generally favourable".

== Chart performance ==
MTV Unplugged debuted at number 50 in Australia, number 19 in Austria, number 26 in Belgian Flanders Ultratop, number 13 in Belgian Wallonia Ultratop, number 34 in Netherlands, number 45 in France, number 8 in Germany, number 11 in Italy, number 15 in Switzerland. On 25 June 2020, the album also ranked at number 1 in Ireland, Scotland and in the UK.

== Track listing ==
MTV Unplugged (Live at Hull City Hall) track listing
No.	Title	Writer(s)	Length
1.	"Wall of Glass"	Liam Gallagher; Andrew Sidney Fox; Andrew Wyatt; Greg Kurstin; Michael Tighe	4:09
2.	"Some Might Say"	Noel Gallagher	4:57
3.	"Now That I've Found You"	L. Gallagher; Simon Aldred	3:30
4.	"One of Us"	L. Gallagher; Wyatt; Damon McMahon	3:33
5.	"Stand by Me"	N. Gallagher	5:57
6.	"Sad Song"	N. Gallagher	4:30
7.	"Cast No Shadow"	N. Gallagher	5:05
8.	"Once"	L. Gallagher; Wyatt	3:56
9.	"Gone"	L. Gallagher; Wyatt; Tighe	3:54
10.	"Champagne Supernova"	N. Gallagher	3:59
Total length:			43:30

Japanese bonus track
No.	Title	Writer(s)	Length
11.	"Greedy Soul"	L. Gallagher	4:11
Total length:			47:45

== Personnel ==
Musicians

- Liam Gallagher – lead vocals (all tracks)
- Drew McConnell – bass (tracks 1, 2, 4, 5, 6, 7, 8, 9), backing vocals (tracks 1, 2, 6, 7), guitar (track 3)
- Andy Marshall – double bass (tracks 4, 5, 6, 8, 9, 10)
- Andy Waterworth – double bass (tracks 4, 5, 6, 8, 9, 10)
- Dan McDougall – drums (tracks 1, 2, 4, 6, 7, 9), backing vocals (tracks 3, 5, 7), percussion (tracks 3, 4, 5, 8, 10)
- Jay Mehler – guitar (tracks 1, 2, 3, 4, 5, 7, 8, 9)
- Mike Moore – guitar (tracks 1, 2, 3, 4, 5, 6, 7, 8, 9)
- Paul Arthurs – guitar (tracks 2, 5, 6, 7)
- Christian Madden – keyboard (all tracks)
- Klara Schuman – cello (tracks 4, 5, 6, 8, 10)
- Llinos Richards – cello (tracks 4, 5, 6, 8, 9, 10)
- Maia Colette – cello (tracks 4, 5, 6, 8, 9, 10)
- Neil Broadbent – cello (tracks 4, 5, 6, 8, 9, 10)
- Helen Sanders-Hewwt – viola (tracks 4, 5, 6, 8, 9, 10)
- Helenah Logah – viola (tracks 4, 5, 6, 8, 9, 10)
- Rhiannon James – viola (tracks 4, 5, 6, 8, 9, 10)
- Vince Green – viola (tracks 4, 5, 6, 8, 9, 10)
- Alex Afia – violin (tracks 4, 5, 6, 7, 8, 9, 10)
- Eugene Feygelson – violin (tracks 4, 5, 6, 8, 9, 10)
- Gareth Griffths – violin (tracks 4, 5, 6, 7, 8, 9, 10)
- Hazel Ross – violin (tracks 4, 5, 6, 8, 9, 10)
- Jonathan Hill – violin (tracks 5, 6, 8, 9, 10)
- Lizzie Ball – violin (tracks 5, 6, 7, 8, 9, 10)
- Frida Touray – backing vocals (tracks 1, 3, 4, 5, 7, 8, 9)
- Holly Quin-Ankrah – backing vocals (tracks 1, 3, 4, 5, 7, 8, 9)
- Rhianna Kelly – backing vocals (tracks 1, 3, 4, 5, 7, 8, 9)

Production

- Eduardo Puhl – engineer (all tracks)
- Adam Noble – mixing (tracks 1, 2, 3, 5, 6, 7, 8, 9, 10)
- Chris Elliot – arranged strings (tracks 4, 8, 9)
- Stephen Hussey – arranged strings (tracks 5, 6, 7, 10)
- Robin Schmidt – mastering (tracks 1, 2, 3, 4, 6, 7, 8, 9)
- James Russell – multi-camera director for MTV

== Charts ==
Chart performance for MTV Unplugged (Live at Hull City Hall)
Chart (2020)	Peak position
Australian Albums (ARIA)	50
Austrian Albums (Ö3 Austria)	19
Belgian Albums (Ultratop Flanders)	26
Belgian Albums (Ultratop Wallonia)	13
Dutch Albums (Album Top 100)	34
French Albums (SNEP)	45
German Albums (Offizielle Top 100)	8
Irish Albums (Official Charts)	1
Italian Albums (FIMI)	11
Japan Hot Albums (Billboard Japan)	33
Japanese Albums (Oricon)	26
Scottish Albums (Official Charts)	1
Swiss Albums (Schweizer Hitparade)	15
UK Albums (Official Charts)	1
US Top Album Sales (Billboard)	34
US Indie Store Album Sales (Billboard)	7

== Certifications ==
Region	Certification	Certified units/sales
United Kingdom (BPI)	Silver	60,000^{‡}
^{‡} Sales+streaming figures based on certification alone.
