= Down by the River Thames =

Live album by Liam Gallagher
- Released: 27 May 2022
- Recorded: 5 December 2020
- Venues: River Thames, London
- Length: 63:14
- Label: Warner

Liam Gallagher chronology
C'mon You Know (2022)	Down by the River Thames (2022)	Knebworth 22 (2023)

Down by the River Thames is the second live album by English singer and songwriter Liam Gallagher. It was released on 27 May 2022 by Warner Records, the same day as his third studio album C'mon You Know. It is an audio recording of the livestream of Gallagher's 5 December 2020 concert on a barge travelling down the River Thames. At the time, concerts in arenas and other venues were prohibited due to COVID-19 lockdowns.

== Track listing ==
Down by the River Thames track listing
No.	Title	Writer(s)	Length
1.	"Hello"	Noel Gallagher; Gary Glitter; Mike Leander	3:08
2.	"Wall of Glass"	Liam Gallagher; Greg Kurstin; Andrew Wyatt; Michael Tighe; Andrew Sidney Fox	3:37
3.	"Halo"	L. Gallagher; Kurstin; Wyatt	4:07
4.	"Shockwave"	L. Gallagher; Kurstin; Wyatt	3:28
5.	"Columbia"	N. Gallagher	4:42
6.	"Fade Away"	N. Gallagher	4:11
7.	"Why Me? Why Not."	L. Gallagher; Simon Aldred	3:32
8.	"Greedy Soul"	L. Gallagher	3:46
9.	"The River"	L. Gallagher; Wyatt	3:15
10.	"Once"	L. Gallagher; Wyatt	3:33
11.	"Morning Glory"	N. Gallagher	4:25
12.	"Cigarettes & Alcohol"	N. Gallagher	4:12
13.	"Headshrinker"	N. Gallagher	4:47
14.	"Supersonic"	N. Gallagher	4:57
15.	"Champagne Supernova"	N. Gallagher	3:58
16.	"All You're Dreaming Of"	L. Gallagher; Aldred	3:36
Total length:			63:14

== Personnel ==
Musicians

- Liam Gallagher – vocals (all tracks)
- Mike Moore – guitar (tracks 1–14, 16)
- Drew McConnell – bass (tracks 1–14, 16), backing vocals (tracks 1–2, 6–7)
- Dan McDougall – drums (all tracks), backing vocals (tracks 2–10, 16)
- Jay Mehler – guitar (tracks 1–14, 16)
- Paul Arthurs – guitar (tracks 5–6, 11–14), acoustic guitar (track 10)
- Christian Madden – keyboards and piano (all tracks)
- Gene Gallagher – drums (track 9)
- Rhianna Kenny-Wybrow, Frida Touray, Jodie Scantlebury – backing vocals (tracks 2–10, 16)

Production

- Tim Summerhayes – recording
- Eduardo Pull – recording assistant
- Tomas Moreno – recording assistant
- Adam Noble – mixing
- Robin Schmidt – mastering

== Charts ==
Weekly chart performance for Down by the River Thames
Chart (2022)	Peak position
Australian Albums (ARIA)	94
Austrian Albums (Ö3 Austria)	35
Belgian Albums (Ultratop Flanders)	87
Belgian Albums (Ultratop Wallonia)	16
French Albums (SNEP)	91
German Albums (Offizielle Top 100)	18
Hungarian Albums (MAHASZ)	8
Irish Albums (IRMA)	19
Italian Albums (FIMI)	78
Japanese Albums (Oricon)	28
Japanese Hot Albums (Billboard Japan)	38
Scottish Albums (Official Charts)	2
Spanish Albums (Promusicae)	73
Swiss Albums (Schweizer Hitparade)	28
UK Albums (Official Charts)	4
US Top Album Sales (Billboard)	59
