= Greedy Soul =

2017 single by Liam Gallagher

Single by Liam Gallagher

from the album As You Were
- Released: September 27, 2017
- Genre: Rock; honky-tonk
- Length: 3:34
- Label: Warner
- Songwriter(s): Liam Gallagher
- Producer(s): Dan Grech-Marguerat

Liam Gallagher singles chronology
"For What It's Worth" (2017)	"Greedy Soul" (2017)	"Come Back to Me" (2017)

Music video
- "Greedy Soul" (Live at Air Studios) on YouTube

"Greedy Soul" is a song by the English singer-songwriter Liam Gallagher from his debut solo album As You Were (2017). The song, released as the album's fourth single on September 27, 2017 following a performance on Later... with Jools Holland, is a rock song with influences from country music. Gallagher explained that the song's lyrics were a vent inspired by his divorce from Nicole Appleton. "Greedy Soul" received mixed reviews from critics, who praised its "swagger" while criticizing its composition. The song peaked at number 56 on the UK singles chart.

== Background and release ==
After the break-up of Beady Eye, Liam Gallagher decided to return to recording music following a period of time off. "Greedy Soul" was first revealed alongside other songs from As You Were during Gallagher's first solo gig, on May 30, 2017 in The Ritz. Later, on September 27, 2017, Gallagher would perform "Greedy Soul" on Later... with Jools Holland alongside "Wall of Glass". The same day, the song was released as the fourth single off As You Were, following "Wall of Glass", "Chinatown", and "For What It's Worth". An accompanying live performance recorded at Air Studios was released to Gallagher's YouTube channel.

Live versions of "Greedy Soul" were later released on the Japanese edition of MTV Unplugged (Live at Hull City Hall) (2020) as a bonus track, and on Down by the River Thames (2022). Gallagher has commented that he enjoys playing "Greedy Soul" live due to its energy, power, and "good vibe".

== Composition and lyrics ==
"Greedy Soul" is an "uptempo rocker" with a "glammy, foot-stomping country bounce". The song's instrumentation primarily consists of overdriven electric guitar and "pounding" drums, alongside a "howling harmonica"; during the chorus, the song has a "falling-vocal" melody. Paul Carr of PopMatters sonically compared the song to those by Black Rebel Motorcycle Club, while ABC News identified The Beatles and T. Rex as possible influences. Daniel Kohn of Paste compared "Greedy Soul" to the Oasis song "Supersonic".

In an interview with Paste, Gallagher noted that the song, co-written with Greg Kurstin and Andrew Wyatt, is lyrically a vent against "lots of fucking cunts" written in an intentionally-confident manner. Gallagher also specified in an interview with GQ that the song's "venomous" lyrics come from "a place of vengeance", taking inspiration from his divorce with Nicole Appleton.

== Critical reception ==
"Greedy Soul" received mixed reviews from music critics. Phil Mongredien of The Guardian called the song a stand-out on the album due to its "swagger", while Richard Smirke of Billboard compared "Greedy Soul" to the "finest" songs of Gallagher's brother and Oasis bandmate Noel. Anna Gaca of Spin called the song the best on As You Were credited to Gallagher alone, yet conceded that he was "better off with help". In negative reviews, Laura Snapes of Pitchfork criticized Gallagher's vocal performance as sounding "uncomfortable at higher tempos", while Gareth James of Clash called the song "vacuous filler with only the faintest hint of a chorus". Martyn Young of Dork commented that the song was "lumpen and severely lacking in a bit of oomph", though noted that it could have been a "punk rock banger" if it were recorded by Oasis during their Definitely Maybe era.

== Credits and personnel ==
Credits are adapted from liner notes of As You Were.

=== Performing artists ===
- Liam Gallagher – vocals, acoustic guitar, songwriter
- Dan Grech-Marguerat – programming, producer, recording engineer
- Davey Baduik – programming
- Dan McDougall – drums, bass guitar, acoustic guitar, electric guitar, keyboards
- Mike Moore – electric guitar
- Martin Slattery – keyboards, saxophone
- Mark Brown – saxophone
- Mike Kearsey – trombone
- Ben Edwards – trombone
- Sally Herbert – brass arrangement
- Victoria Akintola – background vocals

=== Additional personnel ===
- Mark Stent – mixing engineer
- Joel Davies – assistant recording engineer, assistant engineer
- Charles Haydon Hicks – assistant recording engineer
- Ben Mclusky – assistant recording engineer

== Charts ==
Chart performance for "Greedy Soul"
Chart (2017)	Peak position
Scotland (OCC)	63
UK Singles (OCC)	56
UK Singles Downloads (OCC)	86
