= 4 AM (Cherry Ghost song) =

Single by Cherry Ghost

from the album Thirst for Romance
- Released: 24 September 2007
- Recorded: Ape Studios, Little Neston
- Genre: Indie rock
- Length: 3:06 (radio edit); 3:42 (album version)
- Label: Heavenly Records
- Songwriter(s): Simon Aldred
- Producer(s): Simon Aldred, Dan Austin

Cherry Ghost singles chronology
"People Help the People" (2007)	"4 AM" (2007)	"'iTunes Festival: Live in London (EP)'" (2007)

"4 AM" is the jangly, alt-country-influenced third single taken from Cherry Ghost's top 10 debut album Thirst for Romance. Available on CD and 7" vinyl on September 24, 2007 as well as a digital download on 8 October 2007, the single follows the top 30 single "People Help the People" and debut single "Mathematics." The 7" vinyl single features an original demo of "Mary on the Mend," which bears little resemblance to the album version.

Although previous single "People Help the People" entered the UK singles chart at #27, "4 AM" failed to make the top 100 (entering at #128). Promotion for the album began to subside shortly thereafter. A music video was produced for the song, being the first video to feature the entire band.

== Track listings ==
All songs written by Simon Aldred.

Promo CD (HVN171CDRP):

- Released in August 2007
1. "4 AM" (Edit) – 3:06
2. "4 AM" (Instrumental) – 3:42

CD (HVN171CD) & digital download (UK iTunes only):

1. "4 AM" – 3:42
2. "Creature of Moderation" – 3:03

7" vinyl (HVN171):

1. "4 AM" – 3:42
2. "Mary" (Demo) – 4:40
