= Girl Shy =

1924 American film

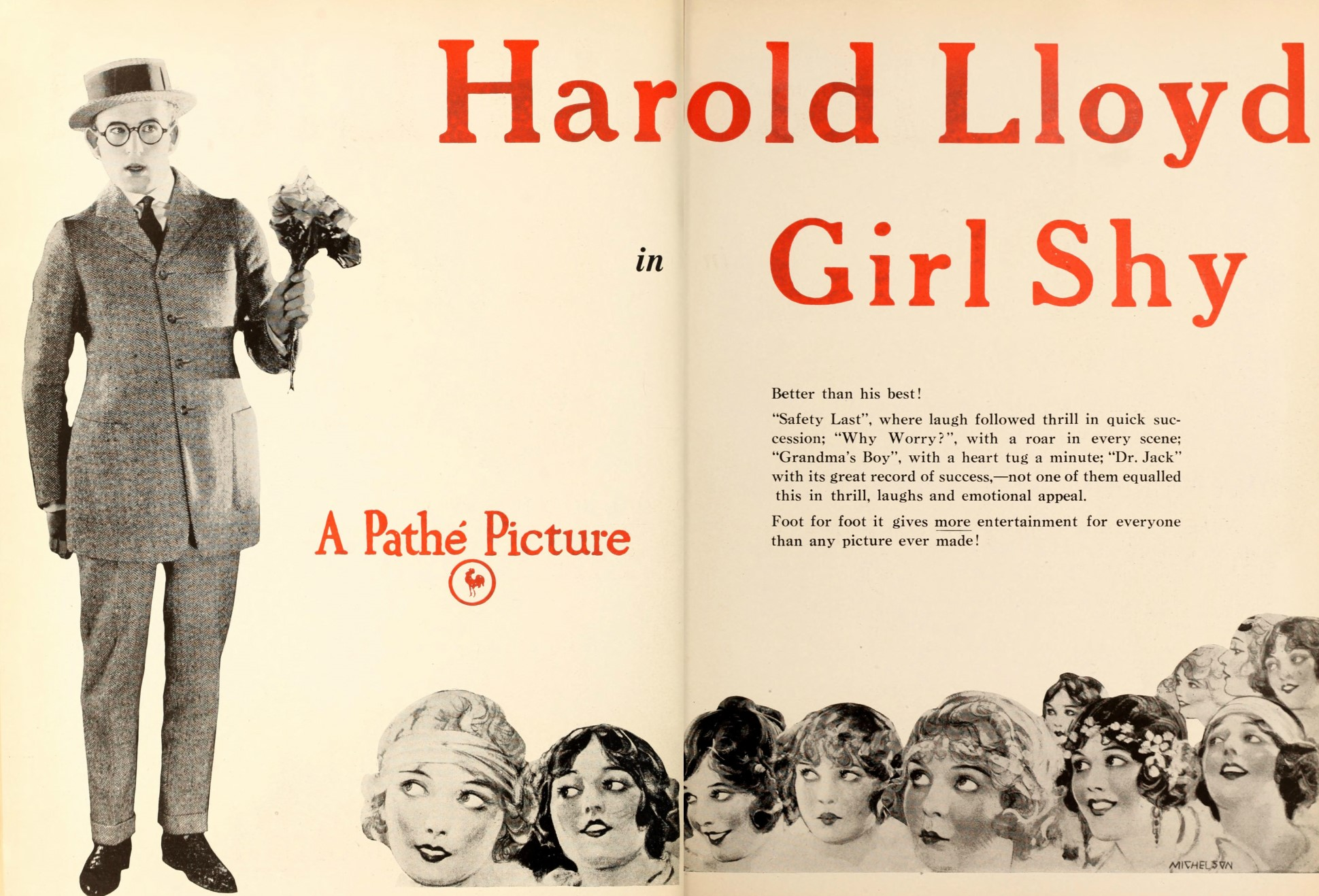
- Advertisement from Motion Picture News
- Directed by: Fred C. Newmeyer; Sam Taylor
- Written by: Thomas J. Gray (titles); Sam Taylor (story); Tim Whelan (story); Ted Wilde (story)
- Produced by: Harold Lloyd
- Starring: Harold Lloyd; Jobyna Ralston
- Cinematography: Walter Lundin
- Edited by: Allen McNeil
- Distributed by: Pathé Exchange
- Release date: April 20, 1924
- Running time: 89 minutes
- Country: United States
- Languages: Silent film English intertitles
- Budget: $400,000 (estimated)
- Box office: $1,550,000

Girl Shy is a 1924 romantic comedy silent film starring Harold Lloyd and Jobyna Ralston. The movie was written by Sam Taylor, Tim Whelan and Ted Wilde and was directed by Fred C. Newmeyer and Taylor. In 2020, the film entered the public domain.

== Plot ==
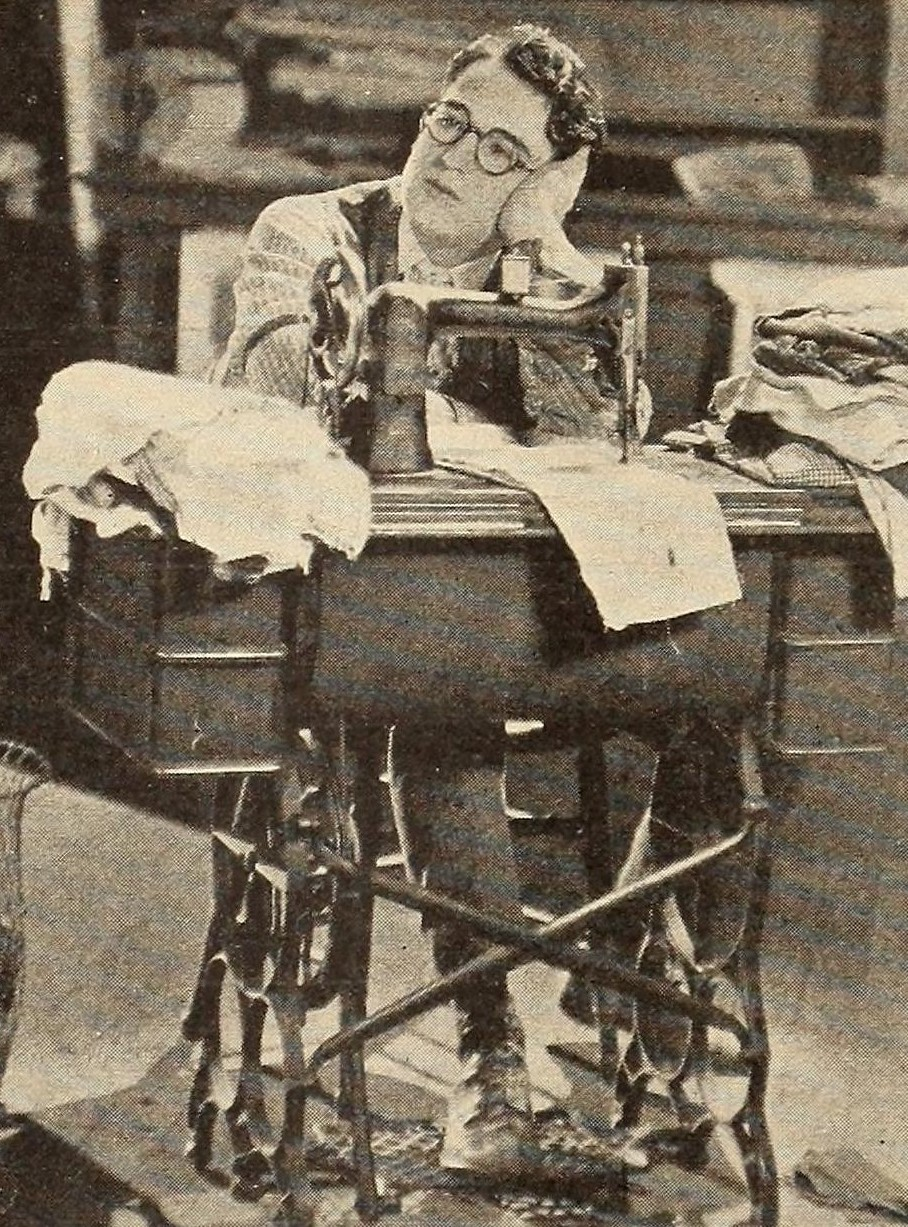
Harold Lloyd as Harold Meadows

Girl Shy (1924)

Harold Meadows is a tailor's apprentice for his uncle in Little Bend, California. He is so shy around women that he can barely speak to them (to stop his stuttering, his uncle has to blow a whistle). Despite this, Harold writes a "how to" book for young men entitled The Secret of Making Love, detailing how to woo different types of young women, such as "the vampire" and "the flapper" (in scenes that parodied two other popular films of the time, Trifling Women and Flaming Youth), and takes a train to see a publisher in Los Angeles.

Rich young Mary Buckingham boards the same train after her automobile breaks down. No dogs are allowed aboard, so she hides her Pomeranian under her shawl, but her pet jumps off as the train pulls away. Harold rescues her dog and helps Mary hide it from the conductor. She sees his manuscript, so he starts telling her about his book, overcoming his stuttering in his enthusiasm. They become absorbed in each other. Upon returning home to Buckingham Estate (filmed at Harold Lloyd's own mansion), Mary rejects the latest marriage proposal from her much-older suitor, Ronald DeVore, whom she suspects is merely after her large inheritance.

After her car is repaired, Mary intentionally detours through Little Bend repeatedly, hoping to see Harold again. On one such trip, Ronald is also along for the ride, and his unwanted attentions cause Mary to get her car stuck near the outskirts of Little Bend. While Ronald walks back to town for a tow, Mary happens to meet Harold. After telling Mary about the remainder of his book, Harold informs her that he is going to see the publisher, Roger Thornby, in a few days to deliver a new chapter that will be about her. They agree to meet afterward. Meanwhile, Ronald runs into a middle-aged woman who asks if he is finally going to introduce her to his family, but he stalls her, then rides away in the tow-vehicle.

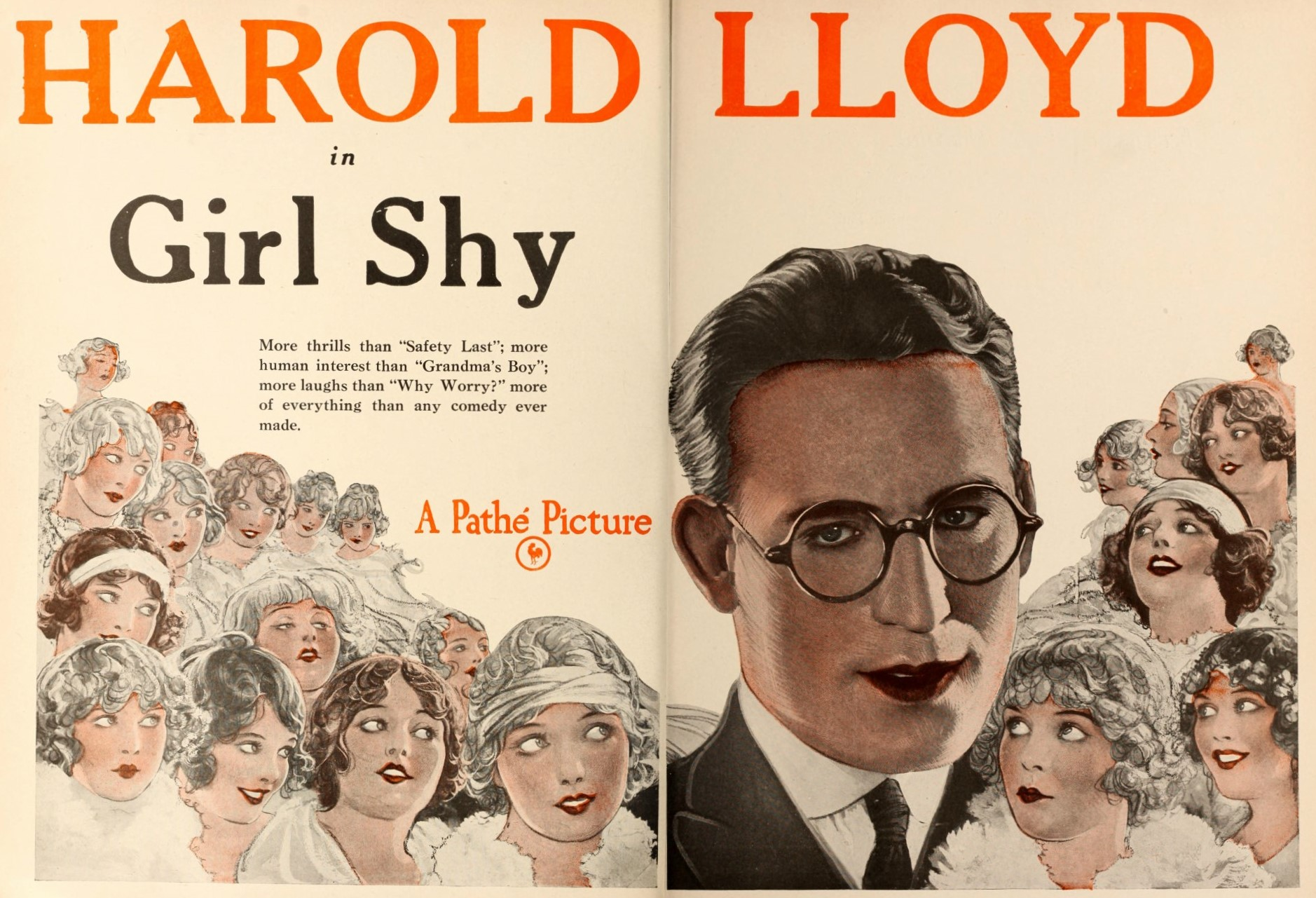
Advertisement from Motion Picture News

Mr. Thornby's professional readers find Harold's book hilariously absurd, so he rejects it. Without any royalty money, Harold figures he cannot ask Mary to marry him. So he pretends that he was only using her as part of his literary research. Heartbroken, Mary impulsively agrees to marry Ronald. Meanwhile, one of Thornby's employees convinces him that, if the staff liked the book so much, there must be a market for it, so Thornby decides to publish it as The Boob's Diary, a humorous spoof on the many romantic-advice manuals prevalent at the time.

A few days later, a depressed Harold gets a letter from the publisher, but he just rips it up unread, assuming it is the rejection letter that Thornby had said he would be sent. Fortunately, his uncle notices that one of the scraps is part of an advance royalty check for $3,000; the letter states that the book will be published as a comedy. At first, Harold is outraged, but then realizes that he can propose to Mary after all. However, when he sees a newspaper headline announcing Mary and Ronald's wedding scheduled for that same day at her family's estate, Harold gives up. By chance, the woman whom Ronald had met a few days earlier walks in and, seeing the newspaper story, tearfully exclaims that she is Ronald's wife. As proof, she shows Harold a locket with the couple's wedding portrait and the engraved words "to my wife" that Ronald gave her two years earlier.

Harold embarks on a frenzied dash to stop the wedding, a journey involving bootleggers, car chases, and multiple changes of vehicle through the countryside and along the crowded streets of Culver City and Los Angeles. Harold bursts in just as Ronald is about to put the wedding ring on Mary's finger, but cannot stop stuttering long enough to expose Ronald's intended bigamy. So Harold simply carries Mary off; she does not resist. When they are alone, Harold tells Mary about Ronald's previous marriage and shows her the locket. Mary gets Harold to propose to her (with an assist from a passing mail carrier's whistle, which Mary blows to stop Harold's stuttering), and she accepts.

== Cast ==
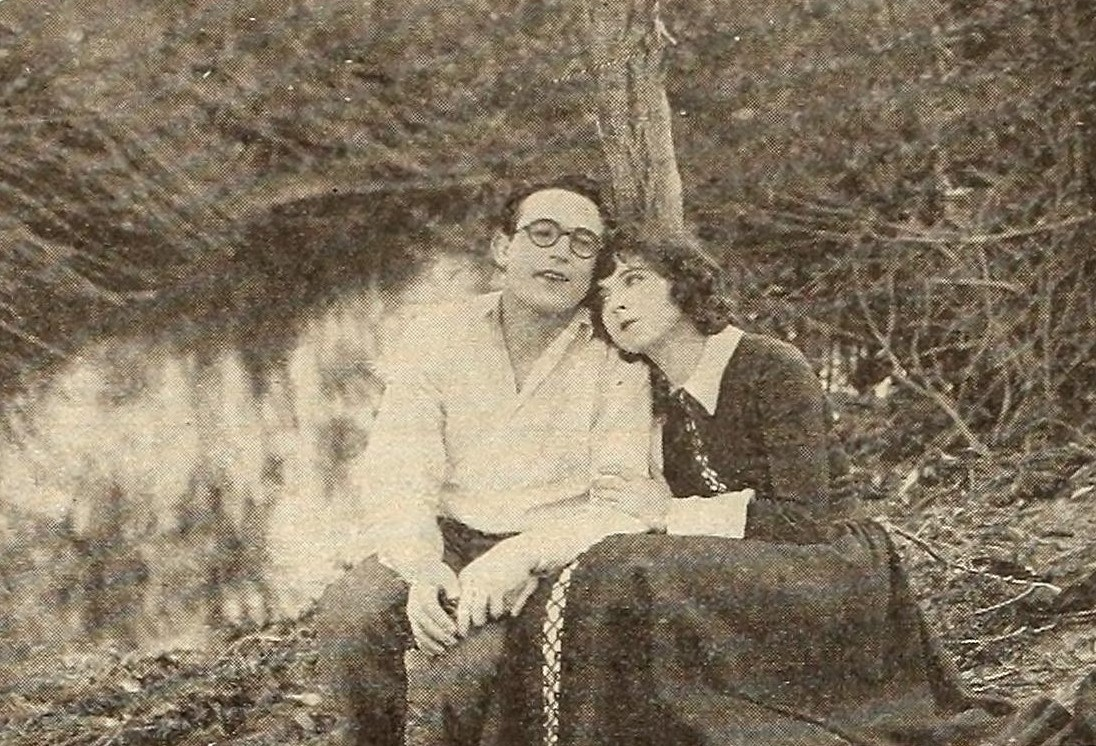
Harold Lloyd and Jobyna Ralston in Girl Shy

- Harold Lloyd as Harold Meadows, The Poor Boy
- Jobyna Ralston as Mary Buckingham, The Rich Girl
- Richard Daniels as Jerry Meadows, The Poor Man
- Carlton Griffin as Ronald DeVore, The Rich Man
- Nola Luxford as The Wife of Ronald DeVore (uncredited)
- Judy King as The Flapper Girl (uncredited)
- Henry A. Barrows as Roger Thornsby (uncredited)
- William Orlamond as Thornsby's Assistant (uncredited)
- Gus Leonard as A Bearded Train Passenger (uncredited)
- Earl Mohan as A Sleeping Trolley Rider (uncredited)
- Joe Cobb ("Our Gang") as A Newsboy (uncredited)
- Jackie Condon ("Our Gang") as A Newsboy (uncredited)
- Mickey Daniels ("Our Gang") as A Newsboy (uncredited)

== Production ==
This was Lloyd's first independent production after his split with Hal Roach. It is what Lloyd called a "character story" (as opposed to a "gag film"), and is notable for containing fewer of the stunts which characterize Lloyd's other films throughout most of its length, and instead focusing more on the relationship between Lloyd and Ralston. However, the lengthy finale of the film is one of the most exhilarating, non-stop action sequences of Lloyd's career.

It was also the second of six consecutive movies pairing Harold Lloyd and Jobyna Ralston, who left Hal Roach Studios as well to continue working with Lloyd. Unlike the normal style for filmed romances prior to Girl Shy, both Ralston and Lloyd were featured in comedic scenes.

== In other media ==
The scene of the protagonist's run to stop the wedding is entirely quoted in the video clip of "Diamond in the Grind", a 2010 song by Cherry Ghost taken from the album Beneath This Burning Shoreline.

== See also ==
- Harold Lloyd filmography
- List of United States comedy films
