= Black Fang =

Black Fang can refer to:

- "Black Fang", a single by Cherry Ghost from the album Beneath This Burning Shoreline
- Black Fang, a guild of assassins in the video game Fire Emblem: The Blazing Blade
- Black Fang, a character in the film HappinessCharge PreCure! the Movie: The Ballerina of the Land of Dolls
- Sōmei Inaba, also known as the Black Fang, a character in the manga series Cuticle Detective Inaba
