= For What It's Worth (Liam Gallagher song) =

2017 single by Liam Gallagher

Single by Liam Gallagher

from the album As You Were
- Released: August 10, 2017
- Genre: Pop rock; Britpop
- Length: 4:11
- Label: Warner
- Songwriters: Liam Gallagher; Simon Aldred
- Producer: Dan Grech-Marguerat

Liam Gallagher singles chronology
"Chinatown" (2017)	"For What It's Worth" (2017)	"Greedy Soul" (2017)

Music video
- "For What It's Worth" (Lyric Video) on YouTube

"For What It's Worth" is a song by the English singer-songwriter Liam Gallagher from his debut solo album As You Were. The song, a pop rock apology ballad, was written by Gallagher alongside Simon Aldred. Gallagher described the song's lyrics as an "apology to whoever", as opposed to dedicating the apology to anyone in specific. It was released on August 9, 2017 as the third single from As You Were, alongside an accompanying lyric video. The song received positive reviews from music critics, who praised the maturity of its lyrics and its catchiness.

== Background and release ==
After the break-up of Beady Eye, Liam Gallagher decided to return to recording music following a period of time off. He wrote "For What It's Worth" alongside Simon Aldred of the band Cherry Ghost, wanting a "regretful but not desperate" apology song. On August 9, 2017, Gallagher posted an a cappella snippet of the song to his Twitter account, following an August 7 tweet where he suggested a new song would be released soon. The next day, "For What It's Worth" was released for digital download and streaming as the third single off As You Were, following "Wall of Glass" and "Chinatown". An accompanying lyric video for the song was simultaneously released.

== Composition and lyrics ==
"I think it’s one of the great songs I’ve sung on, ever. I’ve pissed off a lot of people and I’ve hurt a lot of people. And I’d like to dedicate this song to them. And that’s it — and we move on. I’m not gonna keep saying “sorry” for the rest of me life. It happened. I’ve not killed anyone. It’s to everyone in the universe who I’ve pissed off or let down. But it’s certainly not just about Noel or anyone. It could be about my kids, my mum, my ex-missus, anyone. It’s about a lot of people."

— Liam Gallagher on the meaning of "For What It's Worth" for Variety.

"For What It's Worth" is a "mid-tempo" pop rock and Britpop ballad. Composed in C major, the song's instrumentation consists primarily of acoustic guitar alongside piano, strings and a "steady backbeat", with an electric guitar riff cutting through the track at regular intervals. Various music critics compared the sound of "For What It's Worth" to songs by Oasis, particularly "Don't Look Back in Anger"; (Note: Attributed to Stereogum's Chris Deville, Vulture's Frank Guan, Rolling Stone's Jon Blistein, NME's Leonie Cooper, PopMatters' Paul Carr, BrooklynVegan's Bill Pearis, and American Songwriter's Thom Donovan.) Gallagher himself even referred to it as the "most Oasis-y song on the album".

Lyrically, Gallagher has described "For What It's Worth" as an "apology to whoever", acknowledging that he's "pissed a lot of people off" but saying he's "not gonna write a song for each and every one of them". Nonetheless, Anna Gaca of Spin surmised that the lyric "Let's not pretend you were ever searching for saints" referred to Gallagher's ex-wife Nicole Appleton, a member of the girl group All Saints, and Dave Simpson of The Guardian noted that the song is "reputedly" an apology towards her in specific.

== Critical reception ==
"For What It's Worth" received positive reviews from music critics, with Chris Deville of Stereogum remarking that Gallagher's performance "reminds us that he's still one of our great living rock 'n' roll singers". Singer-songwriter Robbie Williams called it his favorite song of 2017, saying that "it's universal and speaks straight to the heart". Similarly, Jill Lawless of the Associated Press praised the song for showing "hints of a new maturity" for Gallagher. Various critics have also compared the song favorably to those released by his brother and former bandmate Noel Gallagher, with Richard Smirke of Billboard saying that the song "came close to equalling Noel's finest efforts". Leonie Cooper of NME conceded that the song, while not clever, didn't need to be in lieu of being catchy. Following the reunion of Oasis, Thom Donovan of American Songwriter named "For What It's Worth" one of Gallagher's four best solo songs.

== Live performances ==
On August 14, 2017, Gallagher performed "For What It's Worth" on The Late Show with Stephen Colbert, in his US television debut as a solo artist. A week later, on August 24, 2017, he released a live recording of the song from Air Studios to his YouTube channel, containing his usual live band combined with a "tasteful" string section. On October 6, 2017, Gallagher performed "For What It's Worth" as part of his appearance on The Graham Norton Show. He later included the song in the setlist of various 2017–2018 tours in support of As You Were. On June 29, 2019, Gallagher performed the song as part of his setlist during the 2019 Glastonbury Festival.

== Credits and personnel ==
Credits are adapted from liner notes of As You Were.

- Liam Gallagher – vocals, songwriter
- Dan Grech-Marguerat – programming, producer, recording engineer
- Dan McDougall – drums, bass guitar, acoustic guitar, electric guitar, keyboards
- Mike Moore – electric guitar, bass guitar
- Ian Burdge – cello
- Martin Slattery – keyboards, saxophone
- Sally Herbert – violin, strings
- Rachel Robson – viola
- Simon Aldred – songwriter
- Mark Stent – mixing engineer
- Joel Davies – assistant recording engineer
- Charles Haydon Hicks – assistant recording engineer
- Ben Mclusky – assistant recording engineer

== Charts ==
Chart performance for "For What It's Worth"
Chart (2017)	Peak position
Belgium (Ultratip Bubbling Under Flanders)	32
Belgium (Ultratip Bubbling Under Wallonia)	30
Czech Republic Modern Rock (IFPI)	8
Ireland (IRMA)	91
Scotland Singles (OCC)	19
UK Singles (OCC)	33
UK Singles Downloads (OCC)	26

== Certifications ==
Region	Certification	Certified units/sales
United Kingdom (BPI)	Gold	400,000^{‡}
^{‡} Sales+streaming figures based on certification alone.

== Release history ==
Release history for "For What It's Worth"
Region	Date	Format(s)	Label	Ref.
Various	August 10, 2017	Digital download; streaming	Warner	
United States	August 22, 2017	Alternative radio	Warner	
United States	August 22, 2017	Mainstream rock radio	Warner	
Italy	September 8, 2017	Radio airplay	Warner	
