= People Help the People =

2007 single by Cherry Ghost

Single by Cherry Ghost

from the album Thirst for Romance
- Released: 12 June 2007
- Recorded: Ape (Little Neston, Cheshire, England)
- Genre: Indie rock
- Length: 3:59
- Label: Heavenly
- Songwriter: Simon Aldred
- Producers: Dan Austin; Simon Aldred

Cherry Ghost singles chronology
"Mathematics" (2007)	"People Help the People" (2007)	"4 AM" (2007)

"People Help the People" is the second single taken from Cherry Ghost's début album, Thirst for Romance. It was made available to download on 11 June 2007, and followed two weeks later on CD and 7-inch vinyl. The band played the song live on Later... with Jools Holland on 24 November 2006. Jimi Goodwin of the band Doves plays drums on the single. "People Help the People" peaked the UK Singles Chart at number 27. The song was also a hit in Italy.

The song was written in Aldred's childhood box room bedroom in Bolton in the run up to Christmas 2005.

Two music videos were produced for the song, one directed by Huse Monfaradi, the other one directed by Chris Hopewell.

== Track listings ==
All songs written by Simon Aldred, except where noted.

CD (HVN168CD):

1. "People Help the People" – 3:59
2. "Four Eyes" – 4:47

7" vinyl (HVN168):

1. "People Help the People" – 3:59
2. "Please Come Home" (Aldred, Parsons, Rhodes) – 4:39

Download (UK iTunes only):

1. "People Help the People" – 3:59
2. "People Help the People" (Cowboys and Cosmonauts Remix) – 4:10

== Weekly charts ==
Chart (2007)	Peak position
Ireland (IRMA)	41
Italy (FIMI)	23
United Kingdom (Official Charts Company)	27

== Birdy version ==
"People Help the People"

Single by Birdy

from the album Birdy
- B-side: "Without a Word"
- Released: 28 October 2011
- Recorded: 2011
- Genre: Folk; soul
- Length: 4:16
- Label: Warner Music
- Songwriter: Simon Aldred

Birdy singles chronology
"Shelter" (2011)	"People Help the People" (2011)	"1901" (2012)

Music video
- "People Help the People" (Official) on YouTube

English musician Birdy released a cover version of the song, on 28 October 2011 as a download in the United Kingdom. In 2012, the song received attention in Australia when it was used in a trailer for a Neighbours storyline.

=== Music video ===
A music video to accompany the release of "People Help the People" was released on YouTube on 6 October 2011 with a total length of four minutes and eighteen seconds. It was shot in black and white, and features Birdy walking through London. The video had 237 million views as of April 2025. Another music video, released on YouTube 30 October 2012, was shot in France. It was directed by Florent Déchard.

=== Track listing ===
Download
No.	Title	Length
1.	"People Help the People"	4:16
2.	"People Help the People" (Two Inch Punch Remix)	4:53
3.	"People Help the People" (Dawn Golden and Rosy Cross Remix)	6:30
4.	"Without a Word"	3:08

=== Charts ===
==== Weekly charts ====
Chart (2011–2014)	Peak position
Australia (ARIA)	10
Austria (Ö3 Austria Top 40)	7
Belgium (Ultratop 50 Flanders)	2
Belgium (Ultratop 50 Wallonia)	5
Czech Republic Airplay (ČNS IFPI)	13
Denmark (Tracklisten)	37
France (SNEP)	7
Germany (GfK)	3
Ireland (IRMA)	84
Italy (FIMI)	22
Luxembourg Digital Songs (Billboard)	1
Netherlands (Dutch Top 40)	5
Netherlands (Single Top 100)	5
Scotland Singles (Official Charts)	30
Slovakia Airplay (ČNS IFPI)	19
Slovenia (SloTop50)	1
Spain (Promusicae)	7
Switzerland (Schweizer Hitparade)	2
UK Singles (Official Charts)	33

==== Year-end charts ====
Chart (2012)	Position
Belgium (Ultratop 50 Flanders)	9
Belgium (Ultratop 50 Wallonia)	17
Netherlands (Dutch Top 40)	16
Netherlands (Single Top 100)	22

Chart (2013)	Position
Austria (Ö3 Austria Top 40)	49
Belgium (Ultratop 50 Wallonia)	61
France (SNEP)	31
Germany (Media Control AG)	37
Slovenia (SloTop50)	14
Switzerland (Schweizer Hitparade)	12

=== Certifications ===
Region	Certification	Certified units/sales
Australia (ARIA)	3× Platinum	210,000^{‡}
Austria (IFPI Austria)	Platinum	30,000^{*}
Belgium (BRMA)	Platinum	30,000^{*}
Denmark (IFPI Danmark)	Platinum	90,000^{‡}
France (SNEP)	Gold	75,000^{*}
Germany (BVMI)	Platinum	300,000^{^}
Italy (FIMI)	Platinum	50,000^{‡}
New Zealand (RMNZ)	Platinum	30,000^{‡}
Spain (Promusicae)	Gold	30,000^{‡}
Switzerland (IFPI Switzerland)	2× Platinum	60,000^{^}
United Kingdom (BPI)	Platinum	600,000^{‡}
^{*} Sales figures based on certification alone.^{^} Shipments figures based on certification alone.^{‡} Sales+streaming figures based on certification alone.

=== Release history ===
Country	Date	Format	Label
Ireland	28 October 2011	Download	Warner Music
United Kingdom	30 October 2011	Download	Warner Music
