= As You Were (Liam Gallagher album) =

Studio album by Liam Gallagher
- Released: 6 October 2017
- Recorded: 2016–2017
- Genre: Rock
- Length: 44:44
- Label: Warner Bros.
- Producer: Greg Kurstin; Dan Grech-Marguerat; Andrew Wyatt

Liam Gallagher chronology
| As You Were (2017) | Why Me? Why Not. (2019) |

Singles from As You Were
- 1. "Wall of Glass" Released: 1 June 2017; 2. "Chinatown" Released: 30 June 2017; 3. "For What It's Worth" Released: 10 August 2017; 4. "Greedy Soul" Released: 27 September 2017; 5. "Come Back to Me" Released: 7 November 2017

As You Were is the debut solo studio album by English singer and songwriter Liam Gallagher. It was released on 6 October 2017 by Warner Bros. Records. A critical and commercial success, the album debuted at number one in the UK, outselling the rest of the top 10 of the UK Albums Chart combined and achieving gold certification in its first week. It has since been certified platinum in the UK. It also achieved the highest single-week vinyl sales in 20 years, with 16,000. In part for his work on the album, producer Greg Kurstin also won the 2018 Grammy Award for Producer of the Year, Non-Classical.

== Background ==
The album was announced in June 2017 with the release of the single "Wall of Glass". Gallagher also revealed that he would launch his first solo tour of the United States and Canada to support the album's release. Once he completed the lyrics, Liam told NME that he cried his eyes out and thought 'I'm back'. The album's title comes from the sign-off Gallagher often used for his Twitter posts. Gallagher worked with producers Greg Kurstin, Andrew Wyatt and Dan Grech-Marguerat on the album, with Kurstin producing the tracks "Wall of Glass", "Paper Crown", "Come Back to Me", and "Doesn't Have to Be That Way", Wyatt producing "Chinatown", and Grech-Marguerat producing the remaining tracks.

== Critical reception ==
Professional ratings
Aggregate scores
| Source | Rating |
|---|---|
| AnyDecentMusic? | 6.5/10 |
| Metacritic | 71/100 |
Review scores
| Source | Rating |
| AllMusic | 4/5 stars |
| The A.V. Club | B+ |
| The Daily Telegraph | 4/5 stars |
| The Guardian | 3/5 stars |
| Mojo | 4/5 stars |
| NME | 4/5 stars |
| Pitchfork | 4.9/10 |
| Q | 4/5 stars |
| Rolling Stone | 3.5/5 stars |
| Uncut | 7/10 |

As You Were received generally positive reviews from critics. At Metacritic, which assigns a normalised rating out of 100 to reviews from mainstream publications, the album received an average score of 71, based on 24 reviews.

Stephen Thomas Erlewine from AllMusic was highly positive about the record in his four-star review, saying, "As You Were doesn't sound retro even though it is, in essence, a throwback to a throwback -- a re-articulation of Liam's '90s obsession with the '60s. That production does Gallagher a favor but so does Kurstin's presence as a co-songwriter, helping to rein in Liam's wandering ear and sharpen his melodies. Ranging from the icy onslaught of "Wall of Glass" to the stark swirl of "Chinatown" this is his best record in nearly a decade, and they add up to an album that illustrates exactly who Liam Gallagher is as an artist. Now in his middle age, he's a richer, nuanced singer than he was during Oasis's heyday, yet he's retained his charisma and, unlike his brother, he favors color and fire in his records, elements that not only enhance this fine collection of songs but make this the best post-Oasis album from either Gallagher to date." Halina Watts from the Daily Mirror was also very positive towards the record, scoring the album five stars and saying, "'As You Were' is the legendary rocker at his very best" and that the album was "well worth the wait". She went on to describe "Chinatown" as a "catchy uplifting poem to the capital" and "For What It's Worth" and "Paper Crown" as "fantastic ballads". Watts rounded off the review by saying, "Bring on album two".

=== Accolades ===
| Publication | Accolade | Rank | Ref. |
|---|---|---|---|
| Rough Trade | Albums of the Year | 32 | |
| NME | NME's Albums of the Year | 10 | |
| Rolling Stone | 50 Best Albums of 2017 | 37 | |

== Commercial performance ==
The album was released in numerous formats, from digital versions to vinyl, CD, and a "special box set" that includes a colorized vinyl record, an "exclusive seven-inch, hardback book and an art print by Klaus Voormann, the artist behind the Beatles' Revolver". The track listing was revealed by Gallagher with the release of the album's second single "Chinatown".

As You Were sold over 103,000 units in its first week in the United Kingdom. It is the ninth-fastest selling debut of the decade within the nation. In 2018, the album was certified Platinum with sales of over 300,000 units in the UK. In the United States, it opened at number 30 on the Billboard 200 with 15,000 album-equivalent units, including 14,000 traditional sales. This marked a successful comeback for Gallagher, as both Beady Eye albums had failed to reach number one in the UK, and their second album had failed to chart at all in the US.

== Track listing ==
Standard edition
| No. | Title | Writer(s) | Producer(s) | Length |
|---|---|---|---|---|
| 1. | "Wall of Glass" | Liam Gallagher; Greg Kurstin; Andrew Wyatt; Michael Tighe; Andrew Sidney Fox | Kurstin | 3:44 |
| 2. | "Bold" | Gallagher | Dan Grech-Marguerat; Iain Archer^{[a]} | 4:00 |
| 3. | "Greedy Soul" | Gallagher | Grech-Marguerat | 3:34 |
| 4. | "Paper Crown" | Wyatt; Tighe | Kurstin | 3:28 |
| 5. | "For What It's Worth" | Gallagher; Simon Jons | Grech-Marguerat | 4:10 |
| 6. | "When I'm in Need" | Gallagher; Iain Archer | Grech-Marguerat; Iain Archer^{[a]} | 4:18 |
| 7. | "You Better Run" | Gallagher | Grech-Marguerat | 3:24 |
| 8. | "I Get By" | Gallagher | Grech-Marguerat | 3:10 |
| 9. | "Chinatown" | Wyatt; Tighe | Wyatt | 3:20 |
| 10. | "Come Back to Me" | Gallagher; Kurstin; Wyatt | Kurstin | 3:20 |
| 11. | "Universal Gleam" | Gallagher | Grech-Marguerat | 4:06 |
| 12. | "I've All I Need" | Gallagher | Grech-Marguerat | 4:10 |
| Total length: | | | | 44:44 |

Deluxe edition bonus tracks
| No. | Title | Writer(s) | Producer(s) | Length |
|---|---|---|---|---|
| 13. | "Doesn't Have to Be That Way" | Gallagher; Kurstin; Wyatt | Kurstin | 3:58 |
| 14. | "All My People / All Mankind" | Gallagher | Grech-Marguerat | 3:55 |
| 15. | "I Never Wanna Be Like You" | Gallagher | Grech-Marguerat; Dan McDougall^{[b]} | 3:51 |
| Total length: | | | | 56:27 |

Japanese edition bonus tracks
| No. | Title | Length |
|---|---|---|
| 16. | "For What It's Worth" (live at Air Studios) | 4:13 |
| 17. | "Greedy Soul" (live at Air Studios) | 3:33 |
| 18. | "Paper Crown" (live at Air Studios) | 3:35 |
| Total length: | | 1:07:48 |

Notes

- ^{^a} signifies original song production.
- ^{^b} signifies original demo production.

== Personnel ==
Credits adapted from liner notes.

Musicians

- Liam Gallagher – lead vocals (all tracks), acoustic guitar (tracks 2, 3, 7, 11, 12, 14, 15)
- Greg Kurstin – bass, drums, acoustic guitar, electric guitar, harmonica, percussion, mellotron, piano, organ, tanpura (tracks 1, 4, 10, 13)
- Dan Grech-Marguerat – programming (tracks 2, 3, 5–8, 11, 12, 14, 15)
- Davey Badiuk – programming (tracks 2, 3, 11, 12, 14)
- Mike Moore – electric guitar (tracks 2, 3, 5–8, 11–13, 15), bass (track 5)
- Dan McDougall – drums, bass, acoustic guitar, electric guitar, keyboards (tracks 2–9, 11, 12, 14, 15)
- Martin Slattery – keyboards, saxophone (tracks 2, 3, 5–7, 11, 12, 14)
- Ben Edwards – trumpet (tracks 3, 6–8, 11)
- Mark Brown – saxophone (tracks 3, 6–8, 11)
- Mike Kearsey – trombone (tracks 3, 6–8, 11)
- Sally Herbert – violin, string arrangement (tracks 2, 5, 6, 11, 14), brass arrangement (tracks 3, 6–8, 11)
- Ian Burdge – cello (tracks 2, 5, 6, 11, 14)
- Rachel Robson – viola (tracks 5, 6, 11, 14)
- Tom Pigott Smith – violin (tracks 6, 11, 14)
- Andrew Wyatt – acoustic guitar (track 4), drum programming, piano, bass, synth, additional guitar, production (track 9), backing vocals (track 1)
- Drew McConnell – bass (track 8)
- Jay Mehler – acoustic guitar, electric guitar (track 8)
- Christian Madden – keyboards (track 8)
- Michael Tighe – acoustic guitar (track 9)
- Bridget Sarai – backing vocals (track 1)
- Vicky Akintola – backing vocals (2, 3, 6, 7, 11)

Production

- Greg Kurstin – production, engineering (tracks 1, 4, 10, 13), mixing (track 10)
- Dan Grech-Marguerat – production, engineering (tracks 2, 3, 5–8, 11, 12, 14, 15), mixing (track 15)
- Andrew Wyatt – production (track 9)
- Iain Archer – original song production (tracks 2, 6)
- Dan McDougall – original demo production (track 15)
- Alex Pasco – engineering (tracks 1, 4, 10, 13)
- Julian Burg – engineering (tracks 1, 4, 10, 13)
- Ben Mclusky – engineering (track 9), engineering assistance (tracks 2, 3, 5–7, 11, 12, 14, 15)
- Joseph Rogers – engineering (track 9)
- Joe Rodgers – engineering (track 15)
- Joel Davies – engineering assistance (tracks 2, 3, 5–8, 11, 12, 14, 15)
- Charles Haydon Hicks – engineering assistance (tracks 2, 3, 5–8, 11, 12, 14, 15)
- Matt Mysko – engineering assistance (track 8)
- Mark "Spike" Stent – mixing (tracks 1–9, 11–14)
- Richard Woodcraft – brass section recording (track 11)
- Julian Simmons – brass section recording (track 11)
- Brian Lucey – mastering (all tracks)

Design

- Hedi Slimane – cover shot, photography
- Liam Gallagher – art direction, design
- Richard Welland – art direction, design
- Pixie Higson – photography commissioning

== Charts ==
=== Weekly charts ===
Chart performance for As You Were
| Chart (2017) | Peak position |
|---|---|
| Australian Albums (ARIA) | 9 |
| Austrian Albums (Ö3 Austria) | 12 |
| Belgian Albums (Ultratop Flanders) | 13 |
| Belgian Albums (Ultratop Wallonia) | 21 |
| Canadian Albums (Billboard) | 28 |
| Dutch Albums (Album Top 100) | 15 |
| Finnish Albums (Suomen virallinen lista) | 22 |
| French Albums (SNEP) | 24 |
| German Albums (Offizielle Top 100) | 14 |
| Hungarian Albums (MAHASZ) | 16 |
| Irish Albums (IRMA) | 1 |
| Italian Albums (FIMI) | 4 |
| Japanese Albums (Oricon) | 10 |
| New Zealand Albums (RMNZ) | 13 |
| Scottish Albums (OCC) | 1 |
| South Korean International Albums (Gaon) | 1 |
| Spanish Albums (PROMUSICAE) | 4 |
| Swedish Albums (Sverigetopplistan) | 23 |
| Swiss Albums (Schweizer Hitparade) | 4 |
| UK Albums (OCC) | 1 |
| US Billboard 200 | 30 |
| US Top Album Sales (Billboard) | 8 |
| US Top Rock Albums (Billboard) | 5 |

=== Year-end charts ===
| Chart (2017) | Position |
|---|---|
| UK Albums (OCC) | 9 |
| Chart (2018) | Position |
| UK Albums (OCC) | 60 |

== Certifications ==
| Region | Certification | Certified units/sales |
|---|---|---|
| United Kingdom (BPI) | Platinum | 300,000^{‡} |
^{‡} Sales+streaming figures based on certification alone.
