= C'mon You Know =

Studio album by Liam Gallagher
- Released: 27 May 2022
- Recorded: 2021
- Genre: Alternative rock, psychedelic rock
- Length: 45:13
- Label: Warner
- Producer: Andrew Wyatt; Emile Haynie; Greg Kurstin; Adam Noble; Simon Aldred; Ariel Rechtshaid; Ezra Koenig; Danny L Harle

Liam Gallagher chronology
MTV Unplugged (Live at Hull City Hall) (2020)	C'mon You Know (2022)	Down by the River Thames (2022)

Singles from C'mon You Know
- 1. "Everything's Electric" Released: 4 February 2022; 2. "C'mon You Know" Released: 1 April 2022; 3. "Better Days" Released: 22 April 2022; 4. "Diamond in the Dark" Released: 26 May 2022; 5. "Too Good for Giving Up" Released: 10 October 2022; 6. "More Power" Released: 7 July 2023

C'mon You Know is the third studio album by English musician Liam Gallagher, released on 27 May 2022 through Warner Records. Andrew Wyatt served as the album's primary producer and co-writer. It was preceded by lead single "Everything's Electric", co-written by Dave Grohl, which charted at #18 on the UK Singles Chart, becoming Gallagher's first solo single to reach the UK Top 20. "C'mon You Know", "Better Days","Diamond in the Dark", "Too Good for Giving Up" and "More Power" were also subsequently released as singles. The album was released the same day as Gallagher's second live album Down by the River Thames. Gallagher toured Europe, Oceania and Latin America in support of the album.

C'mon You Know received generally positive reviews from critics and became Gallagher's fourth solo album to debut at #1 on the UK Albums Chart, attaining silver certification in its first week, and subsequently being certified gold in 2022.

== Background ==
Gallagher announced the album in October 2021, whereupon he stated the song "More Power" was dedicated to his brother Noel, calling it "a naughty little tune" but "lovely". The cover is a photograph of "fans in the pit" at one of Gallagher's shows that was taken at Reading Festival 2021.

== Critical reception ==
Professional ratings
Aggregate scores
Source	Rating
Metacritic	74/100
Review scores
Source	Rating
AllMusic	3.5/5 stars
Clash	7/10
Classic Rock	4/5 stars
Gigwise	8/10
The Guardian	3/5 stars
The Independent	4/5 stars
Mojo	4/5 stars
NME	4/5 stars
Rolling Stone	4/5 stars
The Times	4/5 stars

C'mon You Know received generally positive reviews from critics, with many positive reviews praising its new direction and increased depth. At review aggregator Metacritic, the album received a score from 74 out of 100 based on twelve critics' reviews, indicating "generally favorable" reception. Robin Murray of Clash called it "the broadest of Liam Gallagher's three solo albums, and also the deepest. It's the one in which he learns to bare his soul a little, and accept different influences." Jordan Bassett of NME found it to be Gallagher's "best and most experimental solo album yet", writing that he does not "overthink this third record, which is packed with Summer of Love anthems".

Writing for The Independent, Helen Brown opined that "There's so much sheer, on-one attitude in Gallagher's parka pastichery that's hard to resist. His band are on fire with it. Riffs skirling from the guitars. Drums constantly a-quiver. [...] Fans will only need to give this album a couple of spins before they'll be set to sing along in the festival fields." Reviewing the album for Classic Rock, Ian Fortnam called the album "a bit of a cracker, finding a 'repentant' Liam [...] gleefully infuriating his usual detractors (with 'Diamonds In The Dark''s 'Now I know how many holes it takes to...' hook), delivering catnip ballads ('Too Good For Giving Up'), hitting all the right Liam Gallagher buttons ('Don't Go Halfway') and occasionally kicking hand-me-down Stonesy arse".

== Track listing ==
C'mon You Know track listing
No.	Title	Writer(s)	Producer(s)	Length
1.	"More Power"	Liam Gallagher; Andrew Wyatt	Andrew Wyatt; Emile Haynie	4:23
2.	"Diamond in the Dark"	Gallagher; Wyatt; Michael Tighe	Wyatt; Haynie	3:24
3.	"Don't Go Halfway"	Gallagher; Wyatt; Dan McDougall; Mike Moore	Wyatt	3:21
4.	"C'mon You Know"	Gallagher	Wyatt	5:07
5.	"Too Good for Giving Up"	Gallagher; Simon Aldred	Simon Aldred; Adam Noble	4:03
6.	"It Was Not Meant to Be"	Gallagher; Wyatt	Wyatt	3:35
7.	"Everything's Electric"	Gallagher; Greg Kurstin; Dave Grohl; Friedrich Kunath	Greg Kurstin	3:36
8.	"World's in Need"	Gallagher	Wyatt	3:36
9.	"Moscow Rules"	Gallagher; Wyatt; Ezra Koenig	Wyatt; Ezra Koenig; Ariel Rechtshaid	3:35
10.	"I'm Free"	Gallagher; Wyatt	Wyatt; Danny L Harle	3:00
11.	"Better Days"	Gallagher; Wyatt; Tighe; Tove Lo; Gustav Weber Vernet	Wyatt; Kurstin	4:19
12.	"Oh Sweet Children"	Gallagher; Wyatt	Wyatt	3:14
Total length:				45:13

Deluxe edition bonus tracks
No.	Title	Writer(s)	Producer(s)	Length
13.	"The Joker"	Gallagher; Wyatt; Anthony Rossomando	Wyatt	3:27
14.	"Wave"	Gallagher; Wyatt	Wyatt	3:16
Total length:				51:56

Additional bonus track on the Collector's edition
No.	Title	Writer(s)	Length
15.	"Bless You"	John Lennon	3:32
Total length:			55:28

Additional bonus track on the Japanese edition
No.	Title	Writer(s)	Length
15.	"Too Good for Giving Up" (alternate version)	Gallagher; Aldred	3:58
Total length:			55:54

== Personnel ==
Musicians

- Liam Gallagher – vocals (all tracks), percussion (8), drums (9)
- Andrew Wyatt – acoustic guitar (1, 11, 12), electric guitar (1–3, 6, 10–14), Hammond organ (1, 3, 14), piano (1, 3, 4, 6, 10, 11, 13), sound effects (1, 2), synthesizer (1–3, 6, 8, 10, 14), bass (2–4, 6, 9, 14), drums (2, 6), Mellotron (2, 4, 14), backing vocals (3, 6, 9, 13, 14), drum programming (3), harmonica (4, 8); Moog, Pianet piano (4); organ (6), percussion (6, 8, 11), string arrangement (8, 11), woodwind arrangement (9), melodica (10)
- Andy Waterworth – bass (1, 5, 8, 9, 11)
- Dom Kelly – bass (1, 5, 8, 9, 11)
- Ezra Koenig – bass (1, 5, 8, 9, 11), saxophone (4, 9); piano, synthesizer (9)
- Stephen Street – bass (1, 5, 8, 9, 11)
- Emile Haynie – drum programming (1, 2), sound effects (2)
- Dan McDougall – drums (1, 3–6, 14), shaker (3), percussion (4, 5, 8), bass (5)
- Mike Moore – electric guitar (1, 3, 4, 8, 14), twelve-string guitar (3), acoustic guitar (8, 12), fuzz guitar (9, 12)
- Adam Noble – programming (1, 4–6, 8, 10, 12, 14)
- Ivan Hussey – cello (1, 5, 8, 9, 11), string arrangement (5)
- Maria Collette – cello (1, 5, 8, 9, 11)
- Natalie Rozario – cello (1, 5, 8, 9, 11)
- Nick Holland – cello (1, 5, 8, 9, 11)
- Eliza Marshall – flute (1, 5, 8, 9, 11)
- Helen Sanders-Hewitt – viola (1, 5, 8, 9, 11)
- Jordan Bergmans – viola (1, 5, 8, 9, 11)
- Nicola Hicks – viola (1, 5, 8, 9, 11)
- Úna Palliser – viola (1, 5, 8, 9, 11)
- Dan Oates – violin (1, 5, 8, 9, 11)
- Eos Counsell – violin (1, 5, 8, 9, 11)
- Gareth Griffiths – violin (1, 5, 8, 9, 11)
- Gillon Cameron – violin (1, 5, 8, 9, 11)
- Henry Salmon – violin (1, 5, 8, 9, 11)
- Honor Watson – violin (1, 5, 8, 9, 11)
- Jonathan Hill – violin (1, 5, 8, 9, 11)
- Katie Sharp – violin (1, 5, 8, 9, 11)
- Laura Melhuish – violin (1, 5, 8, 9, 11)
- Lizzie Ball – violin (1, 5, 8, 9, 11)
- Richard George – violin (1, 5, 8, 9, 11)
- Sally Jackson – violin (1, 5, 8, 9, 11)
- Stephen Hussey – violin (1, 5, 8, 9, 11)
- Violeta Barrena – violin (1, 5, 8, 9, 11)
- Althea Edwards – choir (1, 4, 13)
- Angel Williams-Silvera – choir (1, 4, 13)
- Hannah Khemoh – choir (1, 4, 13)
- Joel Bailey – choir (1, 4, 13)
- Kieran Briscoe – choir (1, 4, 13)
- Maleik Loveridge – choir (1, 4, 13)
- Naomi Parchment – choir (1, 4, 13)
- Nicky Brown – choir (1, 4, 13)
- Olivia Williams – choir (1, 4, 13)
- Paul Boldeau – choir (1, 4, 13)
- Paul Lee – choir (1, 4, 13)
- Philly Lopez – choir (1, 4, 13)
- Rebecca Folkes – choir (1, 4, 13)
- Renee Fuller – choir (1, 4, 13)
- Teniola Abosede – choir (1, 4, 13)
- Yasmin Green – choir (1, 4, 13)
- Simon Aldred – acoustic guitar (5)
- B. J. Cole – pedal steel guitar (5)
- Christian Madden – piano (5)
- Dave Grohl – drums (7)
- Greg Kurstin – bass, electric guitar, keyboards, percussion (7, 11); drums, tambura (11)
- Ariel Rechtshaid – drum programming, Mellotron, upright bass (9)
- Bobby Krlic – string arrangement (9)
- Brad Truax – bass (10)
- Gunnar Olsen – drums (10)
- Danny L Harle – musical consultation (10), Mellotron (11)
- Julian Burg – drum programming (11)
- Nick Zinner – electric guitar (11)

Technical

- Randy Merrill – mastering
- Mark "Spike" Stent – mixing
- Adam Noble – engineering (1, 2, 4, 5, 8–14)
- Will Purton – engineering (3, 4, 10), vocal engineering (3), engineering assistance (1, 8, 11, 13, 14)
- Felipe Gutierrez – engineering (4), engineering assistance (3, 5, 14)
- Andrew Wyatt – engineering (6, 10, 12–14), engineering assistance (1)
- Greg Kurstin – engineering (7, 11)
- Julian Burg – engineering (7, 11)
- Matt Tuggle – engineering (7), additional engineering (11)
- Matt Wolach – engineering (7), mixing assistance (all tracks)
- Connor Panayi – engineering (10), engineering assistance (11)
- Kyle Paas – engineering (10)
- Alex Ferguson – engineering assistance (1, 4, 5, 8, 10–14)
- Jedidiah Rimell – engineering assistance (4, 5, 8, 10–14)

== Charts ==
=== Weekly charts ===
Weekly chart performance for C'mon You Know
Chart (2022)	Peak position
Australian Albums (ARIA)	5
Austrian Albums (Ö3 Austria)	12
Belgian Albums (Ultratop Flanders)	19
Belgian Albums (Ultratop Wallonia)	5
Dutch Albums (Album Top 100)	12
French Albums (SNEP)	20
German Albums (Offizielle Top 100)	10
Hungarian Albums (MAHASZ)	2
Irish Albums (IRMA)	2
Italian Albums (FIMI)	15
Japanese Albums (Oricon)	18
Japanese Hot Albums (Billboard Japan)	21
New Zealand Albums (RMNZ)	9
Portuguese Albums (AFP)	20
Scottish Albums (OCC)	1
Spanish Albums (Promusicae)	21
Swiss Albums (Schweizer Hitparade)	8
UK Albums (OCC)	1
US Top Album Sales (Billboard)	16

=== Year-end charts ===
Year-end chart performance for C'mon You Know
Chart (2022)	Position
UK Albums (OCC)	45

== Certifications ==
Certifications for C'mon You Know
Region	Certification	Certified units/sales
United Kingdom (BPI)	Gold	100,000^{‡}
^{‡} Sales+streaming figures based on certification alone.
