= Herd Runners =

Cherry Ghost album

Studio album by Cherry Ghost
- Released: 19 May 2014
- Studios: Yellow Arch Studios, Neepsend, Sheffield, England
- Genres: Indie rock, chamber pop
- Length: 44:52
- Label: Heavenly Recordings
- Producers: Colin Elliot, Simon Aldred

Cherry Ghost chronology
Beneath This Burning Shoreline (2010)	Herd Runners (2014)

Singles from Herd Runners
- 1. "Clear Skies Ever Closer" Released: 24 March 2014; 2. "The World Could Turn" Released: 8 December 2014

Professional ratings
Aggregate scores
Source	Rating
Metacritic	76/100
Review scores
Source	Rating
AllMusic	3.5/5 stars
The Line of Best Fit	7.5/10
NME	8/10

Herd Runners is the third and final studio album by English band Cherry Ghost. It was released in May 2014 on Heavenly Recordings.

== Track listing ==
All tracks are written by Simon Aldred.

No.	Title	Length
1.	"Clear Skies Ever Closer"	3:54
2.	"Don't Leave Me Here Alone"	4:15
3.	"Fragile Reign"	5:06
4.	"Sacramento"	5:20
5.	"The World Could Turn"	4:51
6.	"Drinking for Two"	5:01
7.	"Herd Runners"	5:42
8.	"My Lover Lies Under"	3:37
9.	"Love Will Follow You"	3:54
10.	"Joanne"	3:12
