= Thirst for Romance =

Studio album by Cherry Ghost
- Released: 9 July 2007
- Recorded: 2006–2007
- Studios: Ape Studios, Cheshire; Moolah Rouge Studios, Stockport
- Genres: Indie rock, chamber pop
- Length: 49:27; 69:10 (with hidden track)
- Label: Heavenly
- Producers: Simon Aldred and Dan Austin

Cherry Ghost chronology
Thirst for Romance (2007)	Beneath This Burning Shoreline (2010)

Singles from Thirst for Romance
- 1. "Mathematics" Released: 9 April 2007; 2. "People Help the People" Released: 25 June 2007; 3. "4 AM" Released: 24 September 2007

Thirst for Romance is the debut album by Cherry Ghost, released on 9 July 2007 in the UK. The album was made available on CD, digital download, and double vinyl LP. It was recorded at Ape Studios in Cheshire and Moolah Rouge Studios in Stockport. The first single, "Mathematics", was released on 9 April 2007; the second single "People Help the People" was released on 25 June 2007, just two weeks ahead of the album's release date; and the third single was "4 AM", released on 24 September 2007. "Roses" was an iTunes "single of the week" for the week that the album was released. Thirst for Romance was co-produced by Simon Aldred and Dan Austin. Thirst for Romance entered the UK Albums Chart at #7 upon its first week.

Jimi Goodwin of the band Doves plays drums on "People Help the People" and "Mathematics". In December 2005, when Jimi was acting as a guest host on a BBC Radio 1 show, he featured the then-up-and-coming Cherry Ghost (at the time an alias for the solo performances of Simon Aldred). Simon performed two tracks live and acoustic in the studio: "Dead Man's Suit" and "People Help the People".

== Critical response ==
Professional ratings
Review scores
Source	Rating
AllMusic	3/5 stars
BBC	favourable link
Channel 4	10/10 link
Manchester Evening News	link
MusicOMH	link
NME	4/10 link
Q	4/5 stars
Times Online	link
Uncut	link
Yahoo Music UK	7/10 link

Critical response was generally positive, with Q giving the album 4 stars and Channel 4 awarding the album a full 10 out of 10 stars. However, publications such as NME and AllMusic were less than favourable; the latter declared Cherry Ghost "...yet another one of those indie rock bands..." and of the album noting "...Thirst for Romance hit number seven in its first week, showing that there was a reasonable market for this type of angst, but within six weeks it had vanished from the chart entirely." James Dean Bradfield, lead singer/guitarist of Welsh indie rock group Manic Street Preachers, said that Thirst for Romance was his favourite album of 2007.

== Track listing ==
All tracks are written by Simon Aldred, except where noted.

No.	Title	Writer(s)	Length
1.	"Thirst for Romance"		3:54
2.	"4 AM"		3:39
3.	"Mountain Bird"		3:58
4.	"People Help the People"		3:59
5.	"Roses"		3:48
6.	"Dead Man's Suit"		5:42
7.	"False Alarm"	Aldred, Ben Parsons, Jim Rhodes	3:53
8.	"Alfred the Great"	Aldred, Parsons, Rhodes	3:29
9.	"Here Come the Romans"		4:00
10.	"Mary on the Mend"		7:50
11.	"Mathematics" / "The Same God" (hidden track)		4:34 / 24:53

Notes

- "Mathematics" runs 4:34, and the hidden track "The Same God" appears roughly 14 minutes after "Mathematics" has ended. The track starts at run time 18:53, first beginning with an orchestral interlude and then moving into "The Same God".
- The vinyl pressing of the album places "False Alarm" at track 9 and shifts "Alfred the Great" and "Here Come the Romans" to 7 and 8 respectively. The vinyl does not feature the hidden track.

Japanese CD pressing
No.	Title	Writer(s)	Length
1.	"Thirst for Romance"		3:54
2.	"4 AM"		3:39
3.	"Mountain Bird"		3:58
4.	"People Help the People"		3:59
5.	"Roses"		3:48
6.	"Dead Man's Suit"		5:42
7.	"False Alarm"	Aldred, Parsons, Rhodes	3:53
8.	"Alfred the Great"	Aldred, Parsons, Rhodes	3:29
9.	"Here Come the Romans"		4:00
10.	"Mary on the Mend"		7:50
11.	"Mathematics"		4:34
12.	"Throw Me to the Dogs" (bonus track)		3:44
13.	"Four Eyes" / "The Same God" (bonus track)		4:48 / 25:07

Notes

- The Japanese pressing of the CD features 14 minutes of silence and the hidden track after the bonus track "Four Eyes".

== Release history ==
Country	Date	Label	Format	Catalogue #
United Kingdom	9 July 2007	Heavenly	CD	HVNLP59CD
United Kingdom	30 July 2007	Heavenly	Double LP (heavyweight vinyl)	HVNLP59
Japan	31 October 2007	Toshiba-EMI	CD (two bonus tracks)	TOCP-66728
United Kingdom	19 August 2022	Heavenly	Double LP (15th anniversary reissue)	HVNLP59X

== Credits ==
- Simon Aldred – vocals, guitars
- Jim Rhodes – guitar
- Ben Parsons – keyboards, string arrangements
- Edgar Jones – bass
- Phill Anderson – bass
- Grenville Harrop – drums
- Jimi Goodwin – drums
- Norman McLeod – pedal steel
- Colin McLeod – Hammond organ
- Produced by Simon Aldred and Dan Austin at Ape Studios, Little Neston, Cheshire.
- Additional production by Ben Parsons.
- "Dead Man's Suit" and "False Alarm" recorded at Moolah Rouge Studios, Stockport.
- Engineered and mixed by Dan Austin at Moles Studios, Bath. Assisted by Dan Hulme and Nick Joplin.
- Mastered by Miles Showell at Metropolis Group.
- Design by storeylondondesign.co.uk (website: link).
