= Why Me? Why Not. =

Studio album by Liam Gallagher
- Released: 20 September 2019
- Recorded: April 2018 – April 2019
- Studio: Abbey Road & RAK, London; Bonnie Hill, Echo, & Republic, Los Angeles
- Genre: Alternative rock; hard rock; pop rock
- Length: 39:30
- Label: Warner
- Producer: Greg Kurstin; Andrew Wyatt; Simon Aldred; Adam Noble

Liam Gallagher chronology
As You Were (2017)	Why Me? Why Not. (2019)	MTV Unplugged (Live at Hull City Hall) (2020)

Singles from Why Me? Why Not.
- 1. "Shockwave" Released: 7 June 2019; 2. "The River" Released: 26 June 2019; 3. "Once" Released: 26 July 2019; 4. "One of Us" Released: 16 August 2019; 5. "Now That I've Found You" Released: 11 October 2019; 6. "Gone" Released: 19 March 2020

Why Me? Why Not. is the second studio album by English musician Liam Gallagher, released on 20 September 2019 by Warner Records, a day before his 47th birthday. The album's lead single "Shockwave" became one of Gallagher's biggest solo hits, the best selling vinyl single of 2019 in the UK, and his first solo single to top a chart in general after reaching No. 1 in Scotland. The album received generally positive reviews from critics and debuted at No. 1 on the UK Albums Chart, achieving silver certification in its first week and later being certified gold.

== Background and recording ==
Gallagher, the former frontman of Oasis, had made a successful comeback following the break-up of his post-Oasis band Beady Eye with his platinum-certified debut solo album, As You Were (2017). The album entered the British charts at No. 1, outselling the entire top 10 combined and achieving gold certification in its first week, while also selling more copies than both Beady Eye albums combined. In addition, it received a positive reaction from critics and audiences.

Gallagher revealed that he had begun work on his second album in April 2018, confirming that he would again be working with producer Greg Kurstin as well as Andrew Wyatt, both of whom were involved with his first album. Recording began in April 2018 in Los Angeles and continued sporadically through to 2 April 2019. Some recording was done at Abbey Road Studios in London, most famously used by Gallagher's idols the Beatles. The album features his 18-year-old son Gene playing bongos on the track "One of Us". Unlike his first album, all the tracks are co-written by Gallagher.

The album's name comes from two drawings by Beatles singer John Lennon that Gallagher owns; the first (titled "Why Me?") was bought by Gallagher from a Lennon art exhibition in Munich in 1997, and the second (titled "Why Not.") was given to Gallagher by Lennon's widow Yoko Ono shortly thereafter.

== Promotion ==
On 30 May 2019, Gallagher did a live stream from a local pub's garden, in which he played a new song entitled "Shockwave". The song was later debuted live at Hackney's Round Chapel in London and made available for streaming 7 June as well as a physical vinyl release five days later. Second single, "The River", was released with a music video on 27 June, two days before Gallagher's appearance at Glastonbury festival, in which the song was debuted live.

The documentary film Liam Gallagher: As It Was, which details his comeback and solo career beginnings, premiered on 6 June and featured a snippet of the song "Once". The song gained acclaim from fans and was finally released on 26 July as the third single. Gallagher himself declared it to be one of the best songs he has ever been involved with.

Gallagher played an acoustic set for MTV Unplugged in Hull City Hall on 3 August, showcasing his solo songs as well as selected Oasis tracks. "Once" debuted live and new songs "One of Us", "Now That I've Found You", "Gone", and "Why Me? Why Not." were played publicly for the first time. Gallagher also performed several Oasis songs, including "Stand by Me" for the first time since 2001, and "Sad Song" which he had never performed live before. For the Oasis material, Gallagher was joined on stage by former Oasis guitarist Paul "Bonehead" Arthurs. The special aired on 27 September, several hours after the album debuted at number one in the UK. The performance was later released as Gallagher's first live album, MTV Unplugged (Live At Hull City Hall), containing 10 out of the 17 songs performed. It was released on 12 June 2020 and debuted at number one on the UK charts, becoming Gallagher's third UK no.1 album.

== Critical reception ==
Professional ratings
Aggregate scores
Source	Rating
AnyDecentMusic?	6.9/10
Metacritic	74/100
Review scores
Source	Rating
AllMusic	3.5/5 stars
The Guardian	3/5 stars
The Independent	4/5 stars
Mojo	4/5 stars
NME	4/5 stars
Pitchfork	6.3/10
Q	4/5 stars
Rolling Stone	3.5/5 stars
The Times	4/5 stars
Uncut	7/10

Why Me? Why Not. received mostly positive reviews from music critics. Many positive reviews complemented the album for expanding on the sound of As You Were, with Gallagher's vocals also being singled out for praise. At Metacritic, which assigns a normalized rating out of 100 to reviews from mainstream publications, the album received a weighted average score of 74 based on 20 reviews, indicating "generally favorable reviews".

== Track listing ==
The final track listing was revealed by Gallagher on Twitter. An exclusive original demo of the song "Once" appears on the Collector's Edition.

Standard edition
No.	Title	Writer(s)	Producer(s)	Length
1.	"Shockwave"	Liam Gallagher; Greg Kurstin; Andrew Wyatt	Kurstin	3:30
2.	"One of Us"	Gallagher; Damon McMahon; Wyatt	Wyatt	3:25
3.	"Once"	Gallagher; Wyatt	Wyatt	3:33
4.	"Now That I've Found You"	Gallagher; Simon Aldred	Aldred	3:20
5.	"Halo"	Gallagher; Kurstin; Wyatt	Kurstin	3:58
6.	"Why Me? Why Not."	Gallagher; Aldred	Aldred; Adam Noble	3:38
7.	"Be Still"	Gallagher; Kurstin; Wyatt	Kurstin	3:00
8.	"Alright Now"	Gallagher; McMahon; Wyatt	Wyatt	3:47
9.	"Meadow"	Gallagher; Kurstin; Wyatt	Kurstin	4:05
10.	"The River"	Gallagher; Wyatt	Wyatt	3:26
11.	"Gone"	Gallagher; Michael Tighe; Wyatt	Wyatt	3:45
Total length:				39:30

Deluxe edition bonus tracks
No.	Title	Writer(s)	Producer(s)	Length
12.	"Invisible Sun"	Gallagher; Wyatt	Wyatt	3:36
13.	"Misunderstood"	Gallagher; Aldred	Noble	4:16
14.	"Glimmer"	Gallagher; Tighe; Wyatt; Constantin Veis; Alex Veis	Wyatt	3:40
Total length:				51:02

Collector's Edition bonus tracks
No.	Title	Writer(s)	Producer(s)	Length
15.	"Once" (original demo)	Gallagher; Wyatt	Wyatt	3:50
Total length:				54:52

== Personnel ==
Credits adapted from liner notes.

Musicians

- Liam Gallagher – lead vocals (all tracks)
- Gene Gallagher – bongos (track 2)
- Greg Kurstin – bass, drums, acoustic guitar, electric guitar, harmonica, percussion, mellotron, piano, organ, tanpura (tracks 1, 5, 7, 9)
- Mike Moore – electric guitar (tracks 3, 4, 6, 12, 13, 14), acoustic guitar (track 14)
- Dan McDougall – drums (tracks 3, 4, 6, 10, 12, 13)
- Andrew Wyatt – acoustic guitar, drums, piano, bass, synth, additional guitar, production (track 2, 3, 8, 10, 11, 12, 14), backing vocals (track 1)
- Parker Kindred – drums (track 2)
- Nick Zinner – electric guitar (track 2, 3, 4, 6, 10, 11)
- Christian Madden – keyboards (track 4, 6, 13)
- Richard Craker – guitar, percussion, keyboards (track 4)
- Scott Poley – pedal steel guitar (track 13)
- Nick Movshon – bass (track 14)
- Homer Steinweiss – drums (track 14)
- Antoinette Toni Scruggs, Briana Lee, Charissa Nielsen, Mark Diamond – backing vocals (4)

Production

- Greg Kurstin – production, engineering (tracks 1, 5, 7, 9)
- Andrew Wyatt – production (tracks 2, 3, 8, 10, 11, 12, 14, 15)
- Simon Aldred – production (track 4, 6)
- Damon Duell McMahon – additional production (track 2)
- Richard Craker – additional production (track 4)
- Lewis Jones – strings engineering
- Julian Burg – engineering (tracks 1, 5, 7, 9)
- Alex Pasco – engineering (tracks 1, 5, 7, 9)
- Adam Noble – engineering (tracks 2, 3, 4, 6, 8, 10, 11, 12, 14), production (tracks 6, 13)
- Jacob Munk – engineering (tracks 2, 3, 4, 6, 8, 10, 11, 12, 14)
- Jens Jungkurth – engineering (tracks 11, 14)
- Will Purton – assisted engineering (tracks 2, 3, 4, 6, 8, 10, 11, 12, 14)
- Jay Reynolds – engineering (tracks 13)
- Brandon Bost – engineering (tracks 14)
- Geoff Alexander – Coordinator
- Chris Elliott – Arranged Strings (tracks 1, 2, 4-14)
- Tom Elmhirst – mixing (tracks 2, 14)
- Mark "Spike" Stent – mixing (tracks 1, 3-11)
- Michael Freeman – Assisted mixing (tracks 1, 3-11)
- Richard Woodcraft – brass section recording (track 11)
- Julian Simmons – brass section recording (track 11)
- Randy Merrill – mastering (all tracks)

Design

- Tom Beard – cover shot, photography
- Liam Gallagher – art direction, design
- Richard Welland – art direction, design
- Francois Rousselet – photography

== Charts ==
=== Weekly charts ===
Chart performance for Why Me? Why Not.
Chart (2019)	Peak position
Australian Albums (ARIA)	7
Austrian Albums (Ö3 Austria)	15
Belgian Albums (Ultratop Flanders)	8
Belgian Albums (Ultratop Wallonia)	11
Canadian Albums (Billboard)	50
Czech Albums (ČNS IFPI)	48
Dutch Albums (Album Top 100)	20
Finnish Albums (Suomen virallinen lista)	14
French Albums (SNEP)	17
German Albums (Offizielle Top 100)	3
Hungarian Albums (MAHASZ)	2
Irish Albums (IRMA)	2
Italian Albums (FIMI)	5
Japan Hot Albums (Billboard Japan)	15
Japanese Albums (Oricon)	10
New Zealand Albums (RMNZ)	34
Norwegian Albums (VG-lista)	35
Scottish Albums (OCC)	1
Spanish Albums (PROMUSICAE)	8
Swedish Albums (Sverigetopplistan)	55
Swiss Albums (Schweizer Hitparade)	6
UK Albums (OCC)	1
US Top Album Sales (Billboard)	21
US Top Alternative Albums (Billboard)	17
US Indie Store Album Sales (Billboard)	4

=== Year-end charts ===
Chart (2019)	Position
UK Albums (OCC)	26

== Certifications ==
Region	Certification	Certified units/sales
United Kingdom (BPI)	Gold	100,000^{‡}
^{‡} Sales+streaming figures based on certification alone.
