= Friedrich Kunath =

German visual artist (born 1974)

Friedrich Kunath (born 1974) is a German visual artist who lives in Los Angeles. He was born in Chemnitz, East Germany, and has had numerous solo exhibitions at institutions including the G2 Kunsthalle Leipzig (2024), the KINDL Centre for Contemporary Art, Berlin (2023), CAC Málaga, Spain (2023), Kunstsammlung Jena, Germany (2021), Kunsthal Kade Amersfoort (2016), Schinkel Pavillon (2011), the Hammer Museum, Los Angeles (2010), Kunstverein Hannover (2009), Kunsthalle Baden-Baden (2009), Aspen Art Museum (2008). Group exhibitions include 'The World Belongs to You', Palazzo Grassi, Venice (2011), '11th Triennale für Kleinplastik, Fellbach' (2010) and 'Life on Mars: the 55th Carnegie International' (2008).

Kunath's first major monograph, 'I Don't Worry Anymore,' was published by Rizzoli Electa in 2018.

== Early life ==
Kunath was born in 1974 in Karl-Marx-stadt, later renamed Chemnitz, in East Germany. His mother was a band manager. The family moved to West Germany, and Kunath studied at the Braunschweig University of Art.

== Work ==
Kunath works primarily with oil and airbrush acrylic paintings, but his practice encompasses a range of mediums including drawing, sculpture, large-scale installation, photography, performance and video work. His paintings employ a personal style of conceptual romanticism, layering references from history of German Romanticism, American landscape painting, music lyrics, cartoons and other popular culture.

Kunath co-wrote the song "Everything's Electric" from Liam Gallagher's 2022 studio album C'mon You Know, alongside Gallagher, Dave Grohl, and Greg Kurstin.

== Collections ==
- CAC Málaga, Málaga, Spain
- Carnegie Museum of Art, Pittsburgh, PA
- Center for Early Education, Los Angeles, CA
- Centre Pompidou, Paris, France
- DESTE Foundation for Contemporary Art, Athens, Greece Fondation Louis Vuitton, Paris, France
- Frans Hals Museum, Haarlem, Netherlands
- Hammer Museum, Los Angeles, CA
- Hessel Museum of Art, Bard College, Annandale-on-Hudson, NY Kunstverein Reutlingen, Reutlingen, Germany
- Los Angeles County Museum of Art, CA
- Marciano Art Foundation, Los Angeles, CA
- Museum of Contemporary Art, Los Angeles, CA
- Museum of Contemporary Art, San Diego, CA
- Museum of Modern Art, New York, NY
- Oketa Collection, Tokyo, Japan
- Pinault Collection, Paris, France
- Sammlung Philara, Düsseldorf, Germany
- V-A-C Collection, Moscow, Russia
- Vanhaerents Art Collection, Brussels, Belgium
- Walker Art Center, Minneapolis, MN

== Solo Gallery Exhibitions ==
A full CV of solo and group exhibitions can be found at Kunath's artist page with BLUM Gallery.

Select Gallery Exhibitions

1994

- The easiest thing to grow in a garden is tired, Galerie Peters-Barenbrock, Braunschweig, Germany

2003

- Statement, BQ Gallery, Art Basel, Switzerland

2007

- Twilight, Andrea Rosen Gallery, New York

2008

- Life on Mars, Carnegie International

2012

- Lacan's Haircut, Blum & Poe, Los Angeles, California

2013

- Raymond Moody’s Blues, Modern Art Oxford
- I'm Running Out of World, White Cube, London

2014

- A Plan To Follow Summer Around The World, Le Crédac, Ivry-sur-Seine, France

2015

- Sentimental Air, BQ, Berlin, Germany

2016

- The World is a Beautiful Place (We’re Not Here For Long), Kaikai Kiki Gallery, Tokyo, Japan
- My Loneliness Shines, VNH Gallery, Paris, France

2017

- Frutti di Mare, Blum & Poe, Los Angeles, CA

2018

- One Man's Ceiling is Another Man's Floor, Blum & Poe, New York, NY
- Where is the Madness that You Promised Me, Tim Van Laere Gallery, Antwerp, Belgium

== Art market ==
Kunath is represented by Blum Gallery (Los Angeles, Tokyo, New York), Tim Van Laere Gallery (Antwerp, Rome), Galerie Max Hetzler Berlin, London), Avlskarl Gallery (Copenhagen), and Travesía Cuatro (Madrid, CDMX).

Kunath was represented by Johann König until 2022.
