= Mathematics (Cherry Ghost song) =

Single by Cherry Ghost

from the album Thirst for Romance
- Released: 9 April 2007
- Recorded: Ape Studios, Little Neston
- Genre: Indie rock
- Length: 3:58 (radio edit); 4:34 (album version)
- Label: Heavenly Records
- Songwriter(s): Simon Aldred
- Producer(s): Simon Aldred, Dan Austin

Cherry Ghost singles chronology
"Mathematics" (2007)	"People Help the People" (2007)

"Mathematics" is the debut single from Manchester band Cherry Ghost. It was released as a digital download on 26 March 2007 and on CD and 7" vinyl on 9 April 2007. It went to #57 on the UK singles chart. "Mathematics" acquired the title "song of the week" on BBC Radio 2 in early 2007, and Zane Lowe of BBC Radio 1 declared the song "the hottest record in the world" in February 2007. Jimi Goodwin of Doves plays bass and drums on the single. The B-side "Junebug" is a Sparklehorse cover.

The song's inspiration likely stemmed from songwriter Simon Aldred's Bachelor's degree in Pure Mathematics from the University of Leeds.

Two music videos were made for the song. The first, a self-produced video featuring a man in a bird costume, was posted in late 2006. The second, featuring Simon Aldred's family home movies, appeared on Heavenly Records' website in early 2008.

== Track listings ==
All songs written by Simon Aldred except where noted.

Promo CD (HVN167CDRP):

- Released in March 2007
1. "Mathematics" (Edit) – 3:58
2. "Mathematics" (Album Version) – 4:34

CD (HVN167CD):

1. "Mathematics" – 4:34
2. "Throw Me to the Dogs" – 3:44
3. "I Need You" – 4:56

7" vinyl (HVN167):

1. "Mathematics" – 4:34
2. "Junebug" (Linkous) – 2:01

Digital download (UK iTunes only):

1. "Mathematics" – 4:34
2. "Throw Me to the Dogs" – 3:44
