= Beneath This Burning Shoreline =

Studio album by Cherry Ghost
- Released: 5 July 2010
- Recorded: January – December 2009
- Studios: Frank Bough Sound III, Cheshire
- Genres: Indie rock, chamber pop
- Length: 52:50
- Label: Heavenly Recordings
- Producers: Cherry Ghost, Dan Austin

Cherry Ghost chronology
Thirst for Romance (2007)	Beneath This Burning Shoreline (2010)	Herd Runners (2014)

Singles from Beneath This Burning Shoreline
- 1. "Kissing Strangers" Released: 28 June 2010; 2. "Black Fang" Released: 20 September 2010; 3. "We Sleep on Stones" Released: 8 November 2010; 4. "Only a Mother" Released: 7 March 2011

Beneath This Burning Shoreline is the second studio album by Cherry Ghost, released on 5 July 2010 via Heavenly Records. The band recorded the album themselves with Dan Austin, who co-produced their debut album Thirst for Romance. The album's opening track, "We Sleep on Stones", was offered as a free digital download on the band's website in May 2010. The album's twelfth track, "Diamond in the Grind", was posted on YouTube, set to a clip of Harold Lloyd's 1924 silent film Girl Shy, in February 2010.

A music video for the album's first single "Kissing Strangers" premiered in June 2010. Lead singer Simon Aldred describes the song as "Sinatra-esque," adding that, "I think it's one of the best songs I've ever written... it's nice to have a single I'm really proud of." The album's second single, "Black Fang", was released on 20 September 2010 on 7" vinyl, and came with the exclusive non-album track "Dancehall to Daybreak". The album's third single was "We Sleep on Stones", released on 8 November 2010. The 12" vinyl single featured an exclusive remix of "We Sleep on Stones" by Mr. Chop, as well as Cherry Ghost's cover version of the 1991 CeCe Peniston hit "Finally" and an extended instrumental version of "Finally". A fourth single, "Only a Mother", was released as a digital download on 7 March 2011.

== Recording ==
In March 2008, singer-songwriter Simon Aldred announced through a MySpace blog posting that the band were at the writing stage for the second album and had seven songs written, which had been distilled from over 50 different tunes. The bulk of the album was written across Europe, namely Berlin and Rome. The band recorded the album between January and December 2009 in Frank Bough Sound III, a converted barn in Cheshire, owned by friends and labelmates Doves.

== Reception ==
Professional ratings
Review scores
Source	Rating
AllMusic	3.5/5 stars
BBC	positive
The Guardian	4/5 stars
The Independent	4/5 stars
MusicOMH	4/5 stars
Q	4/5 stars

Beneath This Burning Shoreline was released to positive reviews, garnering 4 out of 5 star reviews from major publications such as Q, The Guardian, The Independent, and The Times. The Guardian summarised that "Cherry Ghost are good at purveying glimpses of seedy lives... and exceptionally good arrangers of strings, guitar and thrumming synths into gorgeous symphonic pop." The Independent noted that, "The prevailing tone throughout is akin to that chastened postwar mood captured by Carol Reed in The Third Man; certainly, Aldred's characters would not be out of place gazing down upon ant-people from a ferris wheel, or fleeing through sewers." AllMusic reviewer Jon O'Brien finalised that the album "furthers Aldred's reputation as one of the U.K.'s most interesting storytellers."

== Track listing ==
All tracks are written by Simon Aldred (lyrics) and Cherry Ghost (music).

No.	Title	Length
1.	"We Sleep on Stones"	5:46
2.	"A Month of Mornings"	5:36
3.	"Conquered, Part 1"	1:02
4.	"Kissing Strangers"	4:35
5.	"Only a Mother"	3:30
6.	"The Night They Buried Sadie Clay"	5:28
7.	"My God Betrays"	4:06
8.	"Barberini Square"	5:48
9.	"Conquered, Part 2"	1:13
10.	"Black Fang"	4:20
11.	"Luddite"	6:17
12.	"Diamond in the Grind"	4:45
13.	"Strays at the Ice Pond"	2:10

== Release history ==
Country	Date	Label	Format	Catalogue #
United Kingdom	5 July 2010	Heavenly Records (distributed by V2 Music)	CD	HVNLP79CD

== Credits ==
Cherry Ghost

- Simon Aldred – vocals, guitars
- Jim Rhodes – guitar, banjo, Echoplex, melodica
- Ben Parsons – keyboards, piano, synthesizer, dulcimer, trumpet
- Phill Anderson – bass, synthesizer
- Grenville Harrop – drums, percussion

Personnel

- Additional synths by Dan Austin.
- Brass and string arrangements by Ben Parsons.
- Strings by Belinda Hammond, Sarah Fletcher, Rick Evans, Tim Smedley, Thea Spiers, and Simon Denton.
- Brass by Lucy Pankhurst, Alan Tokeley, Matthew Ball, and Tim Page.

Production

- Produced by Dan Austin and Cherry Ghost.
- Engineered by Dan Austin; recorded at The Barn.
- Mixed by Dan Austin at Moles Recording Studio; assisted by Nick Joplin.
- Mastered by Miles Showell at Metropolis.
- Photography by Emir Ozsahin.
- Sleeve art by Luke Insect.
