= Everything's Electric =

2022 single by Liam Gallagher

Single by Liam Gallagher

from the album C'mon You Know
- Released: February 4, 2022
- Recorded: 2021 (Note: Gallagher noted in November 2021 that C'mon You Know was sent off for mixing, and that the album had been worked on for "about two months on and off" before he recorded vocals for the song.)
- Studio: RAK Studios, London
- Genre: Rock; pop rock
- Length: 3:36
- Label: Warner
- Songwriters: Liam Gallagher; Dave Grohl; Friedrich Kunath; Greg Kurstin
- Producer: Greg Kurstin

Liam Gallagher singles chronology
"All You're Dreaming Of" (2020)	"Everything's Electric" (2022)	"C'mon You Know" (2022)

Music video
- "Everything's Electric" on YouTube "Everything's Electric" (Lyric Video) on YouTube

"Everything's Electric" is a song by the English singer-songwriter Liam Gallagher, released as the lead single of his third studio album C'mon You Know (2022). The song was co-written by Dave Grohl, who had expressed interest in collaborating with Gallagher as early as 2018. A rock song inspired by "Sabotage" by Beastie Boys and songs by the Rolling Stones, the lyrics of "Everything's Electric" highlight optimism.

"Everything's Electric" was released by Warner Records on February 4, 2022, and its live debut came four days later during the Brit Awards 2022. A music video for the song was released on March 2, 2022, depicting Gallagher performing the song interspersed by shots of his fans. The song received generally positive reviews from critics, who praised its sound and Grohl's presence on the track. "Everything's Electric" topped the UK Singles Downloads Chart, and was certified silver by the British Phonographic Industry.

== Background and composition ==
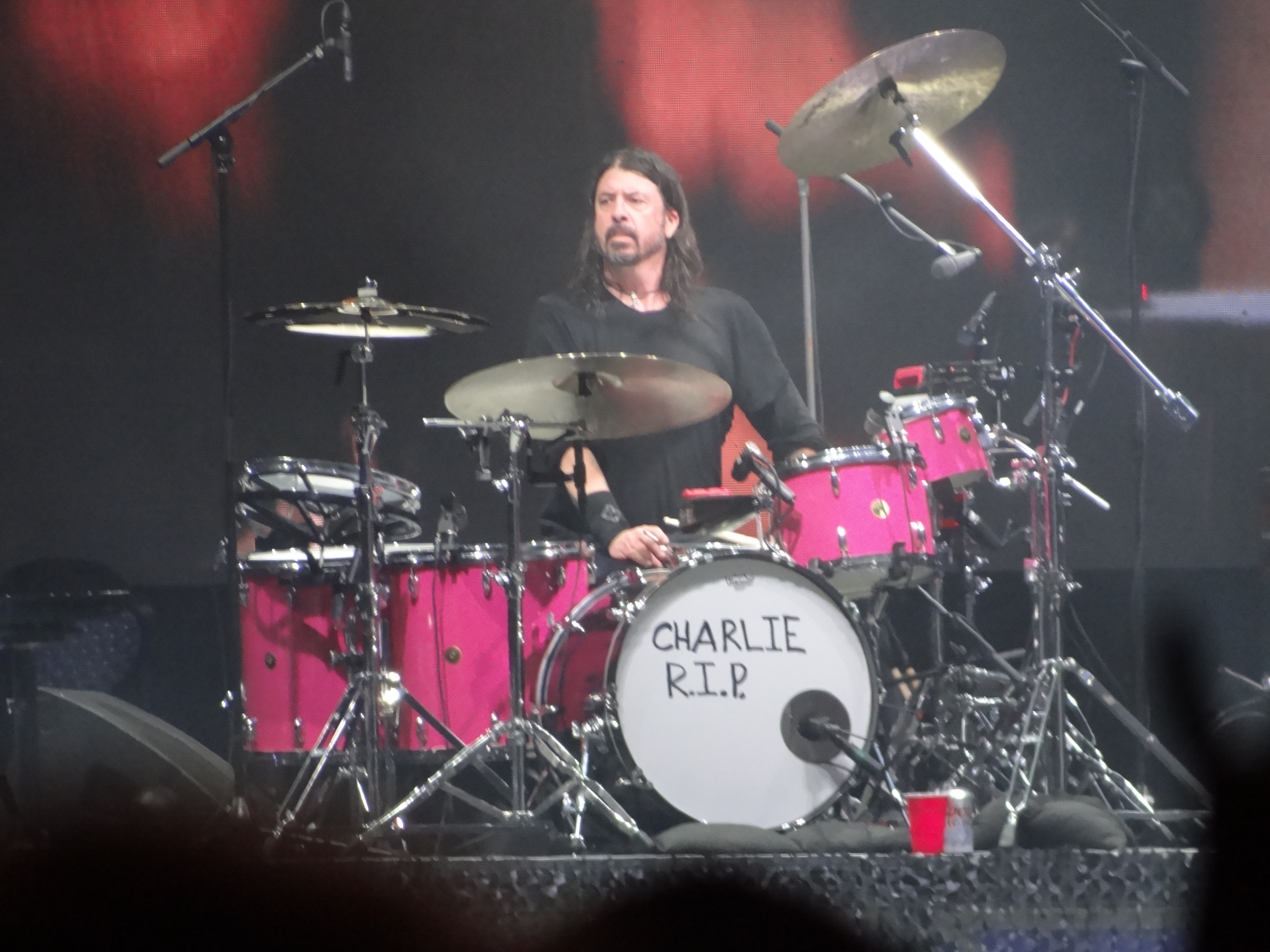
Dave Grohl (pictured in 2021) co-wrote and played drums on "Everything's Electric".

Liam Gallagher and Dave Grohl first met when their bands, Oasis and Foo Fighters respectively, toured together; the two would continue performing together on occasion in the years following. Gallagher later told NME in 2018 that the band reached out to him over a potential collaboration, with Gallagher expressing interest but saying he was "too busy".

While writing C'mon You Know, Kurstin reached out to Grohl over writing a song with a "Beastie Boys Sabotage beat", leading to him writing the drum part for "Everything's Electric". Afterward, after C'mon You Know was initially deemed finished, Gallagher received a phone call saying that Grohl and Kurstin had written "Everything's Electric" for him; upon hearing the song, Gallagher decided to record it for the album. He recorded its vocals the following day at RAK Studios in London, while Grohl recorded drum parts for the track separately at a studio in Los Angeles. According to Gallagher, "Everything's Electric" was the final song completed for C'mon You Know.

"Everything's Electric" is a "rollicking" and "moody" rock and pop rock song. The song begins with a "propulsive" overdriven bassline reminiscent of "Sabotage" by Beastie Boys, before taking on a "vibrant" sound driven by drums and guitars. Instrumentally, the song also contains piano and slide guitar. "Everything's Electric" draws influences from songs by the Rolling Stones, including a guitar coda and "oohs" in the chorus reminiscent of "Gimme Shelter" and "Sympathy for the Devil". Lyrically, Jordan Bassett of NME noted how "Everything's Electric" saw Gallagher "dusting himself off after the wreckage of the last two years" and deciding instead to "celebrate" optimism. Robin Murray of Clash analyzed the song's lyrics similarly, and additionally highlighted the line "I hate you / But I despise that feeling / There's nothing left for you here" as being an "odd moment of introversion".

== Promotion and release ==
On January 20, 2022, Gallagher first announced on his Twitter account that he would be releasing "Everything's Electric" on February 4, 2022. Gallagher then shared a teaser of the track the night before its release, in a post on his TikTok account featuring a clip from the song. "Everything's Electric" was released on February 4, 2022 for digital download and streaming as the lead single of C'mon You Know. A month later, on March 2, 2022, Gallagher released a music video for "Everything's Electric" directed by Charlie Lightening. The black-and-white video features Gallagher performing the song wearing a deerstalker, interspersed with footage of him interacting with fans during live performances. A live version of the song was subsequently released on the 2023 live album Knebworth 22, with Emma Harrison of Clash calling it a "standout" track.

== Critical reception ==
Upon its release, "Everything's Electric" received generally positive review from music critics, Jack Rogers of Rock Sound calling it a "buzzing slice of swaggering British rock and roll brilliance". In a five-star review for NME, Jordan Bassett praised the song's uplifting nature, and particularly praised Gallagher's vocals for being "like a man kicking the shit out of a high striker at the fun fair". Tom Taylor similarly praised the song, giving it a 7/10 in a review for Far Out, however conceded that the song would "not shock anyone with a jolt" and that the lyrics were vapid. In a mixed review of the song, Megan Lapierre of Exclaim! praised how the song "packs a catchy punch", but criticized the song's acoustic guitar hook. Both Will Hodgkinson of The Times and Bryan Kress of Consequence noted the similarity of the song's title to the Oasis song "She's Electric"; however, Hodgkinson used the comparison to criticize the track, declaring that it was "essentially emulating the work" of his brother Noel Gallagher, while Kress instead wrote how Gallagher "had the spark himself" on the track and was "going global with it".

Critics also praised Grohl's presence on "Everything's Electric", with John Garratt of PopMatters writing how he gave the song a "much-needed boost in the rhythmic area". Kress wrote that Grohl delivered a "Nirvana-reaching drum performance", while Rogers called the duo a "match made in heaven". Jackson Maxwell of Guitar World also praised the song's production, writing that Grohl and Kurstin "certainly understood the assignment". Both Alisha Mughal of Exclaim! and Jonah Krueger of Consequence identified "Everything's Electric" as a standout on C'mon You Know, with the former writing that the track was at such a level of quality that the other songs in the album felt "forgettable by comparison".

== Live performances ==
On January 21, 2022, Liam Gallagher announced on Twitter that he would perform the live debut of "Everything's Electric" at the O2 Arena during the Brit Awards 2022 on February 8, 2022. The performance began with footage of Gallagher arriving to the arena via helicopter; he then performed the song accompanied by a live band wearing all black and a military-green winter hat. Later that month, on February 25, 2022, Gallagher performed "Everything's Electric" on The Tonight Show Starring Jimmy Fallon. Abby Jones of Consequence praised Gallagher's performance, writing how the song brought "arena-sized magic into a compact TV studio". "Everything's Electric" was also performed on June 3 and 4 during Gallagher's 2022 Knebworth Park concerts.

== Credits and personnel ==
Credits are adapted from iTunes.

- Liam Gallagher – vocals, songwriter
- Greg Kurstin – keyboards, guitar, bass, percussion, producer, engineer, songwriter
- Dave Grohl – drums, songwriter
- Friedrich Kunath – songwriter
- Mark Stent – mixing engineer
- Randy Merrill – mastering engineer
- Julian Burg – engineer
- Matt Tuggle – engineer
- Matt Wolach – assistant mixing engineer

== Charts ==
Chart (2022)	Peak position
Ireland (IRMA)	44
UK Singles (Official Charts)	18
UK Singles Downloads (Official Charts)	1
US Alternative Digital Song Sales (Billboard)	22

== Certifications ==
Region	Certification	Certified units/sales
United Kingdom (BPI)	Silver	200,000^{‡}
^{‡} Sales+streaming figures based on certification alone.

== Release history ==
Release history for "Everything's Electric"
Region	Date	Format(s)	Label	Ref.
Various	February 4, 2022	Digital download; streaming	Warner	
Italy	February 4, 2022	Radio airplay	Warner	
United States	February 14, 2022	Adult alternative radio	Warner	
United States	February 15, 2022	Alternative rock radio	Warner	
