= Chinatown (Liam Gallagher song) =

Single by Liam Gallagher

from the album As You Were
- Released: 30 June 2017
- Recorded: 2017
- Genre: Rock
- Length: 3:20
- Label: Warner Bros.
- Songwriters: Andrew Wyatt; Michael Tighe
- Producer: Andrew Wyatt

Liam Gallagher singles chronology
"Wall of Glass" (2017)	"Chinatown" (2017)	"For What It's Worth" (2017)

"Chinatown" is a song by English singer Liam Gallagher. It was released as the second single from Gallagher's debut solo studio album, As You Were, on 6 October 2017. It is one of two tracks on the album for which Gallagher does not have a writing credit. Co-writer Michael Tighe stated that the song's sound was inspired by the style of former bandmate Jeff Buckley.

== Music video ==
The music video, filmed in London, features Gallagher drifting by a graffiti-covered underpass and gazing out at the Palace of Westminster. One scene depicts Gallagher staring at a wall with the words "We Stand United With Manchester" on it, acting as a tribute to the victims of the Manchester Arena bombing. At sunset, he navigates the song's titular district, past busy restaurants and supermarkets, as the music video's director, Charlie Lightening, zooms around with his camera.

The music video was directed by Charlie Lightening and produced by Daniel Lightening. It currently has over 5 million views on YouTube.

== Credits and personnel ==
Credits adapted from the liner notes of As You Were.

- Liam Gallagher – vocals
- Andrew Wyatt – songwriter, producer, piano, synthesiser, programming, guitar, bass guitar
- Michael Tighe – songwriter, acoustic guitar
- Dan McDougall – drums, bass guitar, acoustic guitar, electric guitar, keyboards
- Mark Stent – mixing engineer
- Dan Grech-Marguerat – recording engineer
- Joseph Rodgers – recording engineer
- Ben Mclusky – assistant recording engineer, assistant engineer
- Charles Haydon Hicks – assistant engineer
- Joel Davies – assistant engineer

== Charts ==
Chart (2017)	Peak position
Scotland Singles (Official Charts)	32
UK Singles (Official Charts)	56

== Certifications ==
Region	Certification	Certified units/sales
United Kingdom (BPI)	Silver	200,000^{‡}
^{‡} Sales+streaming figures based on certification alone.
