= Shockwave (Liam Gallagher song) =

Single by Liam Gallagher

from the album Why Me? Why Not.
- Released: 7 June 2019
- Recorded: 2018–2019
- Genre: Pop-rock
- Length: 3:30
- Label: Warner
- Songwriter(s): Liam Gallagher; Greg Kurstin; Andrew Wyatt
- Producer(s): Greg Kurstin

Liam Gallagher singles chronology
"Come Back to Me" (2017)	"Shockwave" (2019)	"The River" (2019)

Music video
- "Shockwave" on YouTube

"Shockwave" is a song by English singer Liam Gallagher. It was released as the lead single for his second solo studio album, Why Me? Why Not. (2019). Gallagher co-wrote the song with Andrew Wyatt and producer Greg Kurstin. Kurstin also produced the single.

"Shockwave" was released on 5 June 2019 and entered the UK Singles Chart at number 22, being his highest-charting single since "Wall of Glass". It also became his first solo number-one single, hitting the top spot in Scotland.

== Music video ==
The music video to "Shockwave" was uploaded onto Gallagher's YouTube channel on 13 June 2019. Directed by François Rousselet, it is mostly set in America’s Deep South, though much of it was actually filmed in Budapest. Scenes show Gallagher walking away from a burning building, standing in a train carriage and walking through a crowd of protesters, some of whom are holding signs with the song's lyrics on them as well as the name of the album the song comes from.

== Charts ==
Chart performance for "Shockwave"
Chart (2019)	Peak position
Czech Republic Modern Rock (IFPI)	2
Scotland (OCC)	1
UK Singles (OCC)	22

== Certifications ==
Region	Certification	Certified units/sales
United Kingdom (BPI)	Silver	200,000^{‡}
^{‡} Sales+streaming figures based on certification alone.
