= One of Us (Liam Gallagher song) =

Single by Liam Gallagher

from the album Why Me? Why Not.
- Released: 16 August 2019
- Genre: Alternative rock, symphonic rock, gospel
- Length: 3:25
- Label: Warner
- Songwriter(s): Liam Gallagher; Damon McMahon; Andrew Wyatt
- Producer(s): Andrew Wyatt

Liam Gallagher singles chronology
"Once" (2019)	"One of Us" (2019)	"Now That I've Found You" (2019)

"One of Us" is a song by an English singer and songwriter Liam Gallagher, written by Gallagher, Damon McMahon and Andrew Wyatt, who also produced the track. It was released on Gallagher's second solo album, Why Me? Why Not.

== Composition and lyrics ==
The song features string instrumentation and gospel-influenced backing vocals. According to Liam himself, "One of Us" is a song about "family" as well as "friendship and a sense of belonging". The song's lyrics reminisce Gallagher's youth and details his broken relationship with someone close to him. While Gallagher hasn't confirmed this, it's been heavily speculated by the media and fans that the person Liam is referring to in the lyrics is his brother Noel, given the two have had a troubled and fractured relationship, which was further amplified when Oasis broke up in 2009. The melody of the string instrumentation during the song's chorus is reminiscent of the Bee Gee's song "More Than a Woman". The music video for the song features many references to Oasis and Noel, with the lyric "You said we'd live forever", referencing the Oasis song "Live Forever", further bolstering these rumours. The song also features Gallagher's son Gene playing bongos.

== Music video ==
The music video was released on 28 August 2019, and directed by Anthony Byrne, with the concept written by Steven Knight, one of the directors and the creator of Peaky Blinders respectively. The black-and-white video features Gallagher walking through a field, past old childhood photos of him and his two brothers. Child actors portraying all three Gallagher brothers, Liam, Noel, and Paul also feature. The video also features Liam walking down a street and into a building with the date "28.08.09" written on the door, the day Oasis broke up. The release date of the video was also 10 years to the day the band broke up.

== Charts ==
Chart (2018)	Peak position
Ireland (IRMA)	90
Scotland (OCC)	9
UK Singles (OCC)	50

== Certifications ==
Region	Certification	Certified units/sales
United Kingdom (BPI)	Silver	200,000^{‡}
^{‡} Sales+streaming figures based on certification alone.
