= Cherry Ghost =

English music group

- Cherry Ghost performing at Summer Sundae 2007. Left to right: Phill Anderson, Simon Aldred, Jim Rhodes, and Grenville Harrop.

Background information
- Origin: Bolton, England
- Genres: Indie rock, chamber pop
- Years active: 2006–2016, 2019, 2022
- Label: Heavenly
- Past members: Simon Aldred; Jim Rhodes; Ben Parsons; Phill Anderson; Grenville Harrop
- Website: https://www.cherryghost.co.uk/

Cherry Ghost were an English music group which began in 2006, first as an alias for singer-songwriter Simon Aldred as a solo artist, before morphing into a full band. Their debut album, Thirst for Romance, was released in July 2007 and entered the UK Album Charts at No. 7. It was nominated for an Ivor Novello award as well as winning Aldred an Ivor Novello for best song "People Help the People". A second album, titled Beneath This Burning Shoreline, was released in July 2010 to positive critical acclaim. Aldred, under the moniker Out Cold, released a solo album titled Invasion of Love in September 2013, featuring a markedly synthpop sound. Cherry Ghost released their third and final album Herd Runners in May 2014; Aldred last performed with Cherry Ghost in 2016 on the Marc Riley Show on BBC Radio 6 Music.

Currently based in London, Simon Aldred now works outside of music, as well as occasionally writing for and with other artists. Aldred was the featured vocalist on the 2015 Avicii single "Waiting for Love", and more recently co-wrote several songs with Liam Gallagher, including his 2017 top 40 hit "For What It's Worth".

== History ==
=== Beginnings and Thirst for Romance (2006–2007) ===
The name "Cherry Ghost" is a reference to the Wilco song "Theologians" from the album A Ghost Is Born. In Jan 2006, Simon Aldred began performing as Cherry Ghost as a solo artist, before morphing into a full band. Early sessions with Doves bassist and vocalist Jimi Goodwin and a special appearance on Later...with Jools Holland helped accelerate the band's beginnings. Cherry Ghost were one of only a handful of bands and musicians to have been invited onto Jools Holland's programme before having released any material. Cherry Ghost signed to Heavenly Records, and released their debut single "Mathematics" in April 2007. The debut album, Thirst for Romance, was released in July 2007, following the release of the single "People Help the People" two weeks before, which charted on the UK Singles Chart at No. 27. The album was met with generally positive reviews, and entered the UK Albums Chart at No. 7. A third single, "4 AM," was released in September 2007 and charted at No. 128. A live EP titled iTunes Festival: Live in London, recorded in July 2007 at the iTunes Festival, was released digitally in November 2007.

In September 2007, Cherry Ghost were nominated for Best New Act at the 2007 Q Awards. In 2008, Cherry Ghost won an Ivor Novello Award for "People Help the People" in the category of Best Contemporary Song.

=== Beneath This Burning Shoreline (2008–2012) ===
In March 2008, Simon announced through a MySpace blog posting that the band were at the writing stage for the second album and had seven songs written, which had been distilled from over 50 different tunes. The bulk of the album was written in Berlin and Rome. The band began recording the album in January 2009. A later blog post indicated that the band were recording in a converted barn.

On 27 December 2009, Simon posted on MySpace that the second album had been finished and was "due to be mixed in the next month or two." On 29 April 2010, a message on the band's MySpace page stated the title of the new album as Beneath This Burning Shoreline, with a release date of 5 July 2010. Beneath This Burning Shoreline was released to positive reviews, garnering 4-star reviews from publications such as Q, The Guardian, and The Independent. The album's first single, "Kissing Strangers," was released as a single-track download on 28 June 2010. Second single "Black Fang" was released in September 2010 as the album's first commercial single on 7" vinyl and download; third single "We Sleep on Stones" was released as a double A-side with a cover of the CeCe Peniston hit "Finally" in November 2010. A fourth single, "Only a Mother", was issued as a download in March 2011.

=== Invasion of Love and Herd Runners (2012–2014) ===
Simon Aldred spent much of 2012 and 2013 recording his solo album Invasion of Love, released under the name Out Cold in September 2013. Aldred went into the project not wanting to make another guitar-driven album, instead turning towards synthesizers. In an interview with The Guardian, he said "The pattern of strumming a guitar felt really flat, I didn't want to make another miserable northern record... The last album, I was plucking quotes from Chekhov and film noir, so I wanted to give myself a little break. I could have easily made an acoustic troubadour-style album, and I had half that written, but it shouldn't be that easy... 'Invasion' has a negative connotation, but the album is mostly about embracing relationships and love."

Aldred and Cherry Ghost recorded their third and final studio album Herd Runners in Sheffield with Colin Elliot and Dan Austin. The album was released in May 2014 via Heavenly Recordings and PIAS Recordings. Herd Runners features musical contributions from Liam Gallagher / The Earlies keyboard player Christian Madden, Pedal Steel Guitar player Scott Poley and Saxophonist Nicky Madden.

=== Post-Breakup (2015-present) ===
While they split up in 2015, they briefly reformed in 2019 with "Blue Christmas", just a day before the election. The song itself is a social commentary on the election and how it takes advantage of the poor.

In 2020, a live performance at the Trades Club in Hebden Bridge from 2015 was released.

The band reformed again in 2022 for a one-off concert at the Trades Club.

== Members ==
- Simon Aldred – Lead vocals, guitar
- Jim Rhodes – Guitar
- Ben Parsons – Keyboards
- Phill Anderson – Bass, synthesizer, cornet
- Grenville Harrop – Drums

== Discography ==
=== Albums ===
Year	Album details	Peak chart positions			
Year	Album details	UK	IRE	FRA	ITA
2007	Thirst for Romance: Released: 9 July 2007; Label: Heavenly (HVNLP59); Formats: CD, 2LP, DL	7	67	195	91
2010	Beneath This Burning Shoreline: Released: 5 July 2010; Label: Heavenly (HVNLP79); Formats: CD, LP, DL	40	—	—	—
2014	Herd Runners: Released: 19 May 2014; Label: Heavenly (HVNLP103); Formats: CD, LP, DL	36	—	—	—
2020	Live at the Trades Club Hebden Bridge – January 25, 2015: Released: 29 August 2020; Label: Heavenly/PIAS (HVNLP172); Formats: Limited 2LP (for Record Store Day)	—	—	—	—

=== Singles and EPs ===
Song	Release date	Release info	Formats	UK Singles Chart	Irish Singles Chart	Album
"Mathematics"	9 April 2007	Heavenly (HVN167)	CD, 7" vinyl, DL	57	—	Thirst for Romance
"People Help the People"	25 June 2007	Heavenly (HVN168)	CD, 7" vinyl, DL	27	41	Thirst for Romance
"4 AM"	24 September 2007	Heavenly (HVN171)	CD, 7" vinyl, DL	—	—	Thirst for Romance
iTunes Festival: Live in London (EP)	12 November 2007	Heavenly	Digital download	—	—	UK iTunes-only release
"Kissing Strangers"	28 June 2010	Heavenly (HVN203)	Digital download	—	—	Beneath This Burning Shoreline
"Black Fang"	20 September 2010	Heavenly (HVN206)	7" vinyl, DL	—	—	Beneath This Burning Shoreline
"We Sleep on Stones" / "Finally"	8 November 2010	Heavenly (HVN209)	12" vinyl, DL	—	—	Beneath This Burning Shoreline
"Only a Mother"	7 March 2011	Heavenly	Digital download	—	—	Beneath This Burning Shoreline
"Clear Skies Ever Closer"	24 March 2014	Heavenly	Digital download	—	—	Herd Runners
"The World Could Turn"	8 December 2014	Heavenly	Digital download	—	—	Herd Runners
"—" denotes a release that did not chart.

=== Songs Cherry Ghost have covered ===
- "Junebug" (Sparklehorse) (B-side)
- "Finally" (CeCe Peniston) (B-side)
- "Welcome to the Black Parade" (My Chemical Romance) (played live)
- "Back to Black" (Amy Winehouse) (played live)
- "Under My Thumb" (The Rolling Stones) (played live) link
- "Pounding" (Doves) (played live)
- "Drive" (The Cars) (played live)
- "Androgynous" (The Replacements) (Played Live on Marc Riley Show)

=== Cherry Ghost songs that other artists have covered ===
- "4AM" (Liam Fray)
- "People Help the People" (Birdy)
- "My Lover Lies Under" (Rumer)

== Festival appearances ==
- Camden Crawl 2007: 19 and 20 April
- Glastonbury Festival 2007: Queen's Head stage, 24 June
- Glastonbury Festival 2010: Queen's Head Stage, 26 June
- Glastonbury Festival 2011: Oxylers In West Stage, 25 June
- Oxegen Festival 2007: New Bands/Futures stage
- Latitude 2007: Uncut Arena
- Summer Sundae 2007: Main stage
- Guilfest 2007: Guildford, Stoke Park, July 2007
- iTunes Festival 2007: London, 22 July
- V Festival 2007 Weston Park: Virgin Mobile Union stage, 18 August
- V Festival 2007 Hylands Park: Virgin Mobile Union stage, 19 August
- Dpercussion 2007, Manchester, Main Stage, 4 August
- Ben & Jerry's Sundae On The Common 25 July 2010
- Ramsbottom Festival 2011
