= Wall of Glass =

Single by Liam Gallagher

from the album As You Were
- Released: 1 June 2017
- Length: 3:44
- Label: Warner Bros.
- Songwriter(s): Liam Gallagher; Greg Kurstin; Andrew Wyatt; Andrew Sidney Fox; Michael Tighe
- Producer(s): Greg Kurstin

Liam Gallagher singles chronology
"Scorpio Rising" (2002)	"Wall of Glass" (2017)	"Chinatown" (2017)

"Wall of Glass" is the debut solo single by English singer and songwriter Liam Gallagher. Gallagher co-wrote the song with Andrew Wyatt and producer Greg Kurstin. The song was released as the lead single for Gallagher's debut solo studio album, As You Were (2017). It was initially set for release on 2 June but was instead released a day earlier.

"Wall of Glass" reached number 60 on the UK Singles Chart on 2 June, just one day after its release. It peaked at number 21 after Gallagher's performance at One Love Manchester. It is his best-selling single as a solo artist, eventually being certified Platinum by the BPI, and remained his highest-charting single in the UK until 2022's "Everything's Electric" reached number 18.

== Music video ==
In the song's disorienting video, Gallagher is seen in a hall of mirrors. He later stares into a mirror, but only his reflection sings back. Elsewhere, the camera flips upside down as Gallagher glides down a mysterious hallway, seated on a chair.

The music video was released on 31 May 2017, and is directed by François Rousselet and produced by Riff Raff Film.

== Credits and personnel ==
Credits are adapted from the liner notes of As You Were.

- Liam Gallagher – lead vocals, songwriter
- Greg Kurstin – producer, songwriter, recording engineer, drums, piano, bass guitar, percussion, electric guitar, mellotron, organ, acoustic guitar, harmonica
- Andrew Wyatt – songwriter, background vocals
- Bridget Sarai – background vocals
- Michael Tighe – songwriter
- Andrew Sidney Fox – songwriter
- Mark Stent – mixing engineer
- Julian Burg – recording engineer
- Dan Grech-Marguerat – recording engineer
- Alex Pasco – recording engineer

== Charts ==
Weekly chart performance for "Wall of Glass"
Chart (2017)	Peak position
Belgium (Ultratip Bubbling Under Flanders)	27
Czech Republic Modern Rock (IFPI)	4
France (SNEP)	148
Hungary (Single Top 40)	35
Ireland (IRMA)	82
Scotland (OCC)	5
UK Singles (OCC)	21

== Certifications ==
Certifications for "Wall of Glass"
Region	Certification	Certified units/sales
United Kingdom (BPI)	Platinum	600,000^{‡}
^{‡} Sales+streaming figures based on certification alone.
