= Birdy discography =

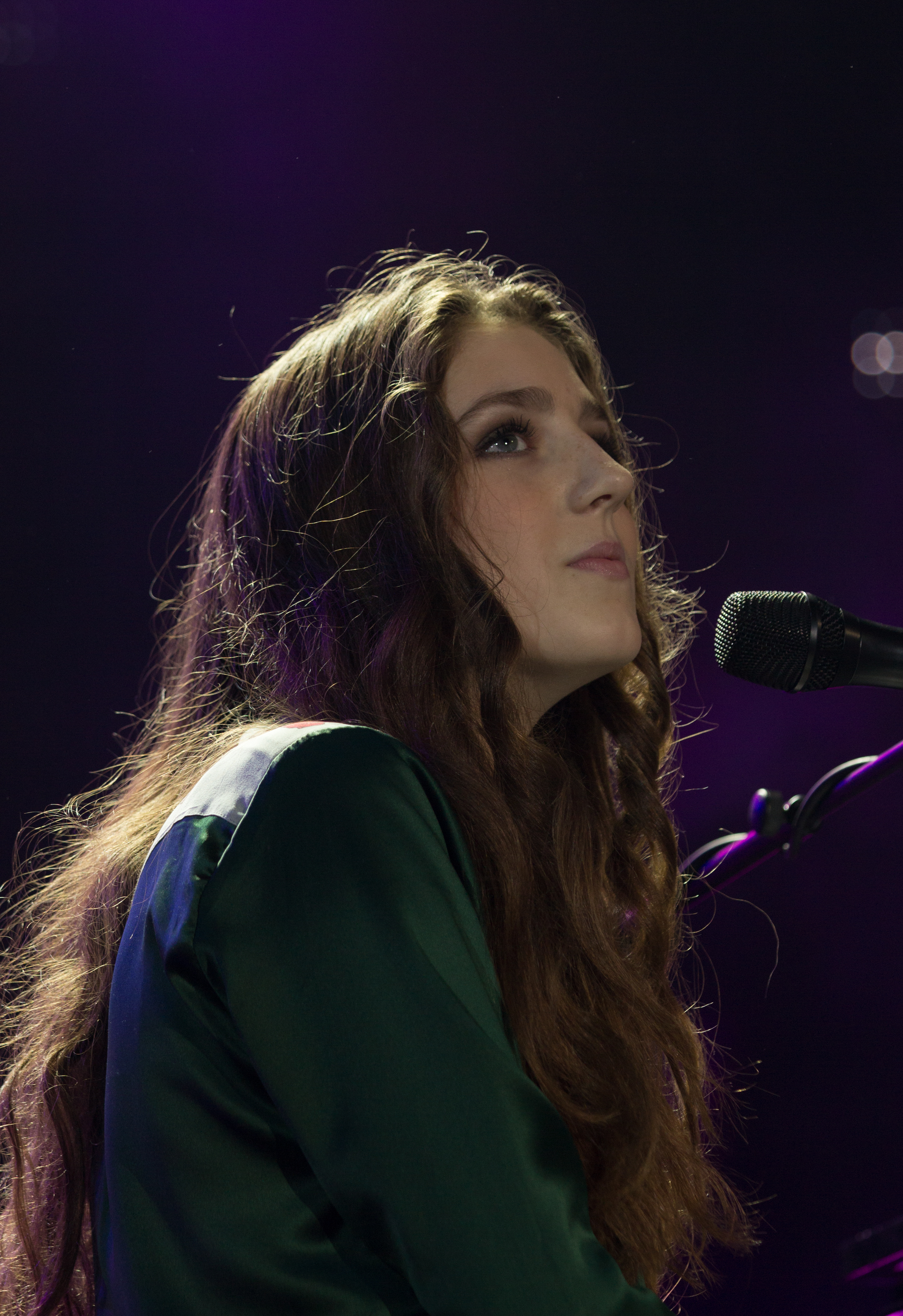
- Birdy performing in 2013
- Studio albums: 5
- Extended plays: 4
- Singles: 15
- Music videos: 15
- Promotional singles: 5

English musician Birdy has released five studio albums, four extended plays, fifteen singles and six music videos in MP3 format. She began her career at the age of 12 when she won the Open Mic UK music competition, singing "So Be Free", a song she composed herself. The competition brought Birdy to the attention of 14th Floor Records, which signed her in 2008.

Birdy released her self-titled debut studio album in November 2011, which consists of cover versions and two original songs. The album reached number one on the Australian, Belgian and Dutch album charts. It was certified triple platinum by the Syndicat National de l'Édition Phonographique (SNEP), platinum by the Belgian Entertainment Association (BEA) and gold by the British Phonographic Industry (BPI). Four singles were released from the album: "Skinny Love", "Shelter", "People Help the People" and "1901", with "Skinny Love" peaking at number one in the Netherlands and number two in Australia.

Birdy's second studio Fire Within was released in September 2013. It peaked at number five in Australia and number eight in the UK. Four singles, "Wings", "No Angel", "Light Me Up" and "Words As Weapons" were released from the album. In March 2016 she released Beautiful Lies, her third album, and reached the top five in Hungary, Ireland, and the UK. It was preceded by the singles "Keeping Your Head Up" and "Wild Horses", taken from the album. Her fourth studio album, Young Heart, was released in April 2021.

== Studio albums ==
List of studio albums, with selected chart positions, sales, and certifications
Title	Album details	Peak chart positions										Sales	Certifications
Title	Album details	UK	AUS	BEL	FRA	GER	NL	NZ	SCO	SWI	US	Sales	Certifications
Birdy	Released: 4 November 2011 (UK); Labels: 14th Floor, Atlantic (5249859582); Formats: CD, LP, digital download, streaming	13	1	1	5	14	1	4	18	3	62	UK: 199,694 (Note: UK sales figures for albums as of December 2017)	BPI: Gold; ARIA: 2× Platinum; BEA: Platinum; BVMI: Platinum; IFPI SWI: Platinum; NVPI: Platinum; RMNZ: Platinum; SNEP: 3× Platinum
Fire Within	Released: 16 September 2013 (UK); Labels: 14th Floor, Atlantic; Formats: CD, LP, digital download, streaming	8	5	2	4	5	3	5	9	1	24	UK: 128,868	BPI: Gold; ARIA: Gold; BVMI: Gold; IFPI SWI: Gold; SNEP: Platinum
Beautiful Lies	Released: 25 March 2016 (UK); Labels: 14th Floor, Atlantic; Formats: CD, LP, digital download, streaming	4	10	7	10	7	8	15	4	2	68	UK: 93,344	BPI: Gold; RMNZ: Platinum
Young Heart	Released: 30 April 2021; Labels: 14th Floor, Atlantic; Formats: CD, LP, digital download, streaming	4	—	19	90	23	18	—	9	11	—		
Portraits	Released: 18 August 2023; Labels: 14th Floor, Atlantic; Formats: CD, LP, digital download, streaming	13	—	28	102	18	—	—	5	10	—		
"—" denotes release that did not chart or was not released in that territory.

== Extended plays ==
Title	Details	Peak chart positions
Title	Details	US Folk
Live in London	Released: 7 November 2011 (UK); Label: Warner; Format: Digital download, streaming	—
Live in Paris	Released: 8 October 2012 (FRA); Label: Warner; Format: Digital download, streaming	—
Birdy – Artist Lounge EP	Released: 9 May 2013 (UK); Label: Atlantic; Format: Digital download	—
Breathe	Released: 24 July 2013 (US); Label: Warner; Format: Digital download	19
Piano Sketches	Released: 6 November 2020; Label: Warner; Format: Digital download, streaming	—
"—" denotes a recording that did not chart or was not released in that territory.

== Singles ==
=== As lead artist ===
List of singles, with selected chart positions, sales figures and certifications
Title	Year	Peak chart positions									Certifications	Album
Title	Year	UK	AUS	BEL (FL)	FRA	GER	IRE	NL	NZ	SWI	Certifications	Album
"Skinny Love"	2011	17	2	3	2	73	2	1	2	19	BPI: 3× Platinum; ARIA: 11× Platinum; BEA: Platinum; BVMI: 3× Gold; IFPI SWI: Platinum; RIAA: Platinum; RMNZ: 4× Platinum; SNEP: Platinum	Birdy
"Shelter"	2011	50	—	—	—	—	39	—	—	—		Birdy
"People Help the People"	2011	33	10	2	7	3	4	5	—	2	BPI: Platinum; ARIA: 3× Platinum; BEA: Platinum; BVMI: Platinum; IFPI SWI: 2× Platinum; RMNZ: Platinum; SNEP: Gold	Birdy
"1901"	2012	—	—	61	—	—	47	—	—	—		Birdy
"Wings"	2013	8	25	3	8	15	1	27	17	3	BPI: 3× Platinum; ARIA: 2× Platinum; BEA: Gold; BVMI: 3× Gold; IFPI SWI: Platinum; RMNZ: 2× Platinum	Fire Within
"No Angel"	2013	—	—	—	168	—	24	51	—	—		Fire Within
"Light Me Up"	2014	—	—	52	—	—	22	—	—	—		Fire Within
"Words as Weapons"	2014	—	—	56	125	63	27	—	—	—		Fire Within
"Let It All Go" (with Rhodes)	2015	58	—	34	—	—	78	—	—	14	BPI: Silver; IFPI SWI: Gold; RMNZ: Gold	Wishes
"Keeping Your Head Up"	2016	57	—	47	27	34	48	64	—	47	BPI: Platinum; ARIA: Platinum; BVMI: Gold; RMNZ: Platinum	Beautiful Lies
"Wild Horses"	2016	75	—	42	—	—	—	—	—	—	BPI: Silver	Beautiful Lies
"Words"	2016	—	—	—	—	—	—	—	—	—		Beautiful Lies
"Have Yourself a Merry Little Christmas"	2020	—	—	—	—	—	—	—	—	—		Non-album single
"Surrender"	2021	—	—	—	—	—	—	—	—	—		Young Heart
"Loneliness"	2021	—	—	—	—	—	—	—	—	—		Young Heart
"Deepest Lonely"	2021	—	—	—	—	—	—	—	—	—		Young Heart
"Second Hands News"	2021	—	—	—	—	—	—	—	—	—		Young Heart
"Little Blue"	2021	—	—	—	—	—	—	—	—	—		Young Heart
"I Only Want to Be with You"	2021	—	—	—	—	—	—	—	—	—		Non-album singles
"Deep End" (Hybrid Minds Remix)	2021	—	—	—	—	—	—	—	— (Note: "Deep End" (Hybrid Minds Remix) did not enter the NZ Top 40 Singles Chart, but peaked at number 22 on the NZ Hot Singles Chart.)	—		Non-album singles
"Open Hearts" (with Haevn)	2021	—	—	—	—	—	—	—	—	—		Non-album singles
"Quietly Yours"	2022	— (Note: "Quietly Yours" did not enter the UK Singles Chart, but debuted and peaked at number 21 on the UK Singles Downloads Chart.)	—	—	—	—	—	—	— (Note: "Quietly Yours" did not enter the NZ Top 40 Singles Chart, but peaked at number 32 on the NZ Hot Singles Chart.)	—		Persuasion (Soundtrack from the Netflix Film)
"State Lines" (with Hybrid Minds)	2022	—	—	—	—	—	—	—	—	—		Non-album singles
"Walking in the Air"	2022	—	—	—	—	—	—	—	—	—		Non-album singles
"Raincatchers"	2023	—	—	—	—	—	—	—	—	—		Portraits
"Heartbreaker"	2023	—	—	—	—	—	—	—	—	—		Portraits
"Your Arms"	2023	—	—	—	—	—	—	—	—	—		Portraits
"Paradise Calling"	2023	— (Note: "Paradise Calling" did not enter the UK Singles Chart, but peaked at number 49 on the UK Singles Sales Chart.)	—	—	—	—	—	—	—	—		Portraits
"—" denotes release that did not chart or was not released in that territory.

=== As featured artist ===
Title	Year	Peak chart positions					Certifications	Album
Title	Year	UK	BEL (FL)	FRA	IRE	ITA	Certifications	Album
"Find Me" (Sigma featuring Birdy)	2016	36	54	193	45	—	BPI: Gold; RMNZ: Gold	Hope
"Non c'è più musica" (Mr. Rain featuring Birdy)	2021	—	—	—	—	71		Petrichor
"Closure" (Sarcastic Sounds featuring Birdy and Mishaal)	2021	—	—	—	—	—		Sarcastic Sounds
"Riverbed" (Matt Ryder featuring Birdy)	2022	—	—	—	—	—		Non-album single
"Head Up" (Cheat Codes featuring Birdy)	2024	—	—	—	—	—		Non-album single
"—" denotes release that did not chart or was not released in that territory.

=== Promotional singles ===
Title	Year	Album
"Hear You Calling"	2016	Beautiful Lies
"Open Your Heart" (Note: "Open Your Heart" debuted and peaked at number 83 on the UK Singles Downloads Chart.)	2020	Piano Sketches
"Island Lights"	2020	Piano Sketches
"If This Is It Now"	2020	Piano Sketches
"Blue Skies"	2020	Non-album single

== Other charted and certified songs ==
Title	Year	Peak chart positions							Certifications	Album
Title	Year	UK	AUS	BEL (FL) Tip	BEL (WA) Tip	IRE	FRA	GER	Certifications	Album
"Young Blood"	2012	—	—	14	15	—	—	—		Birdy
"White Winter Hymnal"	2013	154	—	—	—	—	—	—		Birdy
"Not About Angels"	2014	200	63	—	—	100	—	—	BPI: Platinum; ARIA: 2× Platinum; RIAA: Platinum; RMNZ: Platinum	The Fault in Our Stars
"Tee Shirt"	2014	—	—	—	—	—	—	—	ARIA: Gold	The Fault in Our Stars
"Beautiful Lies"	2016	153	—	—	—	—	—	—		Beautiful Lies
"Deep End"	2016	—	—	—	—	—	—	—	BPI: Silver; ARIA: Gold; RMNZ: Platinum	Beautiful Lies
"I'll Keep Loving You" (David Guetta featuring Jaymes Young and Birdy)	2014	—	—	—	—	—	144	96		Listen
"—" denotes release that did not chart or was not released in that territory.

== Guest appearances ==
Title	Year	Other artist(s)	Album
"Just a Game"	2012	—N/a	The Hunger Games: Songs from District 12 and Beyond
"Learn Me Right"	2012	Mumford & Sons	Brave
"Tee Shirt"	2014	—N/a	The Fault in Our Stars
"Best Shot"	2014	Jaymes Young	The Fault in Our Stars
"Beautiful Birds"	2016	Passenger	Young as the Morning, Old as the Sea

== Music videos ==
Title	Year	Director(s)	Ref.
"Skinny Love"	2011	Sophie Muller	
"Shelter"	2011	Sophie Muller	
"People Help the People"	2011	Adam Powell	
"Skinny Love [One Take Music Video]"	2011	Sophie Muller	
"1901"	2012	Nez	
"Wings"	2013	Sophie Muller	
"Light Me Up"	2013	Sophie Muller	
"Skinny Love (Version 2)"	2014	Sophie Muller	
"Words as Weapons"	2014	Sophie Muller	
"Tee Shirt"	2014	Jeff Greco and Eli Stonberg (Fourclops)	
"Not About Angels"	2014	Elliott Sellers	
"Let It All Go" (with Rhodes)	2015	Sing J. Lee	
"Keeping Your Head Up"	2016	Favourite Colour Black	
"Wild Horses"	2016	Francis Wallis	
"Words"	2016	Dave Bullivant	
"Surrender"	2021	Sophie Muller	
"Loneliness"	2021	Sophie Muller	
"Second Hand News"	2021	Holly Warburton	
"Young Heart"	2021	Lotta Boman (Affair in Tokyo)	
"The Otherside"	2021	Unknown	
"Little Blue"	2021	Lotta Boman (Affair in Tokyo)	
"Voyager"	2021	Lotta Boman (Affair in Tokyo)	
"Evergreen"	2021	Lotta Boman (Affair in Tokyo)	
"Raincatchers"	2023	Max McLachlan (Blink)	
"Heartbreaker"	2023	Jess Kohl	
"Paradise Calling"	2023	Max McLachlan	
