= Breathe (Birdy EP) =

EP by Birdy
- Released: 24 September 2013
- Recorded: 2012–13
- Label: 14th Floor; Atlantic

Birdy chronology
Fire Within (2013)	Breathe (2013)	Beautiful Lies (2016)

Singles from Breathe
- 1. "Wings" Released: 29 July 2013

Breathe is the first extended play (EP) by English musician Birdy, released prior to the 2014 North American release of her second album, Fire Within. It contains three songs from Fire Within (two studio versions and one live version), one song from the Australian Special Edition of her first album, Birdy, and one live version of a song from that same album.

== Track listing ==
No.	Title	Writer(s)	Producer	Length
1.	"Wings" (Single Version)	Jasmine van den Bogaerde; Ryan Tedder	Jasmine van den Bogaerde; Rich Costey; Ryan Tedder
2.	"Wings" (Live from Abbey Road)	Van den Bogaerde; Tedder	Van den Bogaerde; Costey; Tedder
3.	"Shine"	Van den Bogaerde	Jim Abbiss
4.	"What You Want"
5.	"Skinny Love" (Live from the Sydney Opera House)	Justin Vernon	Alex H. N. Gilbert

== Charts ==
Chart (2013)	Peak position
US Americana/Folk Albums (Billboard)	19
