= Beautiful Lies (Birdy album) =

Studio album by Birdy
- Released: 25 March 2016
- Recorded: 2014–2015
- Studio: RAK (London); Rokstone (London); State of the Ark (London); The Music Shed (London); Sarm (London)
- Genre: Indie pop
- Length: 52:49
- Label: Atlantic
- Producer: Jim Abbiss; Birdy; Tim Bran; Phil Cook; Felix Joseph; Roy Kerr; Steve Mac; Romans; Al Shux; TMS

Birdy chronology
Breathe (2013)	Beautiful Lies (2016)	Young Heart (2021)

Singles from Beautiful Lies
- 1. "Keeping Your Head Up" Released: 30 December 2015; 2. "Wild Horses" Released: 11 March 2016; 3. "Words" Released: 20 June 2016

Beautiful Lies is the third studio album by British musician Birdy, released on 25 March 2016 by Atlantic Records. The album includes the singles "Keeping Your Head Up", "Wild Horses", "Words". It reached number four on the UK Albums Chart and entered the top ten in ten other countries.

== Critical reception ==
Professional ratings
Aggregate scores
Source	Rating
Metacritic	73/100
Review scores
Source	Rating
AllMusic	4/5 stars
Entertainment Weekly	B+
The Irish Times	4/5 stars
The Guardian	3/5 stars
PopCrush	4.5/5 stars

Beautiful Lies received generally positive reviews from critics. At Metacritic, the album received a score of 73, based on four reviews.

AllMusic senior editor Neil Z. Yeung commended Birdy's "evolution from acoustic covers singer to confident and powerful artist" and stated, that the album "brings a depth that pulls Birdy from Ingrid Michaelson territory and into a scene occupied by Lorde, Florence, and Lana [Del Rey]." He felt that "with more life, richer texture, and an inspiring attitude, Beautiful Lies is Birdy's declaration that she is more than able to make her mark in the big leagues and join the ranks of the alternative pop pantheon". Marc Snetiker of Entertainment Weekly gave the album a B+ rating and noted that "Beautiful Lies places her square in the middle of the indie pop realm [...] Her third album is her own testament to talent and her proof that she's only dipping her toe into the tropes of her genre to spring upward from them and float onto a cloud all her own."

Dave Simpson of The Guardian called the album "certainly an adult-oriented, mainstream affair [that] has an intriguing, almost eastern feel". The Irish Times writer Tony Clayton-Lea felt the songs on Beautiful Lies showcased Birdy's songwriting abilities, with "telltale names indicating a smart artist getting to grips with the differences between inexperience and hard knocks." He added that "notwithstanding leaf or two taken from the Lorde handbook, Birdy delivers a special brand of off-centre pop music that directly reference her transition from teenager to adult."

== Track listing ==
Standard edition
No.	Title	Writer(s)	Producer(s)	Length
1.	"Growing Pains"	Jasmine van den Bogaerde; Sam Romans	Jim Abbiss	3:49
2.	"Shadow"	Van den Bogaerde; Jamie Hartman	Abbiss; Hartman^{[a]}	4:01
3.	"Keeping Your Head Up"	Van den Bogaerde; Wayne Hector; Steve Mac	Mac; Birdy^{[c]}	3:28
4.	"Deep End"	Van den Bogaerde; Justin Parker	Tim Bran; Roy Kerr	3:28
5.	"Wild Horses"	Van den Bogaerde; John McDaid	TMS; Phil Cook; Jonny Coffer^{[v]}	3:05
6.	"Lost It All"	Van den Bogaerde	Bran; Kerr; Birdy	3:47
7.	"Silhouette"	Van den Bogaerde; Simon Aldred; Rosie Doonan	Bran; Kerr	4:10
8.	"Lifted"	Van den Bogaerde; Ammar Malik; Daniel Omelio	Bran; Kerr	4:23
9.	"Take My Heart"	Van den Bogaerde	Felix Joseph; Birdy	4:11
10.	"Hear You Calling"	Van den Bogaerde; Hector; Mac	Mac	4:01
11.	"Words"	Van den Bogaerde; Conrad Sewell	Al Shux	3:37
12.	"Save Yourself"	Van den Bogaerde; Danny Parker; Teddy Geiger	Bran; Kerr	3:34
13.	"Unbroken"	Van den Bogaerde; Aldred	Bran; Kerr	4:25
14.	"Beautiful Lies"	Van den Bogaerde; Romans	Birdy; Romans	2:50
Total length:				52:49

Deluxe edition bonus tracks
No.	Title	Writer(s)	Producer(s)	Length
15.	"Beating Heart"	Van den Bogaerde; Romans	Bran; Kerr	3:50
16.	"Winter"	Van den Bogaerde	Bran; Kerr	5:06
17.	"Give Up"	Van den Bogaerde; Hector; Tom Barnes; Peter Kelleher; Ben Kohn	TMS	4:00
18.	"Start Again"	Van den Bogaerde; Amy Wadge	Abbiss	3:24
Total length:				69:09

iTunes Store bonus track
No.	Title	Writer(s)	Producer(s)	Length
19.	"Wings" (Acoustic)	Birdy; Ryan Tedder	Tedder; Rich Costey	3:42
Total length:				72:51

Japanese edition bonus tracks
No.	Title	Writer(s)	Producer(s)	Length
19.	"Let It All Go"	Van den Bogaerde; Rhodes	Van den Bogaerde; Rhodes; James Kenosha^{[c]}	4:41
20.	"Lights"	Van den Bogaerde	Jamie Scott	4:44
Total length:				77:35

== Notes ==
- ^{^[c]} signifies a co-producer
- ^{^[a]} signifies an additional producer

== Personnel ==
Musicians

- Birdy – lead vocals (all tracks), piano (1–4, 6–14), string arrangement (4, 6, 7, 12), organ (5), acoustic guitar (8), additional keyboards (11)
- Jim Abbiss – additional programming, keyboards, percussion (1, 2)
- Seye Adelekan – bass guitar, electric guitar (1, 2)
- Rosie Danvers – conductor, string arrangement (1, 2)
- Andy Burrows – drums (1, 2)
- Úna Palliser – erhu (1)
- Asher Levitas – programming (1, 2)
- Liam Howe – synthesizer (1, 2)
- Jamie Hartman – acoustic guitar (2)
- Steve Pearce – bass guitar (3, 10)
- Chris Laws – drums (3, 10)
- Steve Mac – Hammond organ, strings, synthesizer (3); keyboards (10)
- Roy Kerr – programming (4, 6–8, 12, 13), additional keyboards (4, 7, 8, 11–13), keyboards (6), string arrangement (7)
- Tim Bran – programming (4, 6–8, 12, 13), additional keyboards (4, 6–8, 11–13), string arrangement (4, 6, 7, 12, 13), bass guitar (6, 13), Wurlitzer (7)
- Audrey Riley – string arrangement, cello (4, 6, 7, 12, 13); strings (6)
- Sophie Harris – cello (4, 6, 7, 12)
- Alex Thomas – drums (4, 6–8, 12, 13)
- Chris Tombling – lead violin (4, 6, 7, 12, 13)
- Helen Patterson – violin (4, 6, 7, 12, 13)
- Ian Humphries – violin (4, 6, 7, 12, 13)
- Joan Atherton – violin (4, 6, 7, 12, 13)
- Jon Hill – violin (4, 6, 7, 12, 13)
- Laura Melhuish – violin (4, 6, 7, 12, 13)
- Mitch McGugan – violin (4, 6, 7, 12, 13)
- Richard George – violin (4, 6, 7, 12, 13)
- Peter Lale – viola (4, 7, 12, 13)
- Sue Dench – viola (4, 7, 12, 13)
- Mpho McKenzie – backing vocals (5)
- Peter Kelleher – bass guitar (5)
- Tom Barnes – drums (5)
- Phil Cook – guitar (5)
- Ben Kohn – synthesizer (5)
- Sam Romans – backing vocals (6, 8)
- Leo Abrahams – guitar (6–8, 12), acoustic guitar (13)
- Lydia Kavina – theremin (7, 12)
- Philippe Clegg – bass guitar (9)
- Louis Van Der Westhuizen – double bass (9)
- Felix Joseph – drums, piano (9)
- George Cook – drums (9)
- Todd Oliver – guitar (9)
- Dann Pursey – percussion (10)
- Andrew Murray – string arrangement (14)
- Ian Burdge – cello (14)
- Richard Pryce – double bass (14)
- Max Baillie – viola (14)
- Emma Smith – violin (14)
- Tom Piggot-Smith – violin (14)

Technical

- Stuart Hawkes – mastering
- Craig Silvey – mixing (1, 2, 4, 7, 12)
- Serban Ghenea – mixing (3, 5, 10, 14)
- John Hanes – mixing (3, 5, 10)
- Roy Kerr – mixing (6, 9, 11, 13)
- Tim Bran – mixing (6, 9, 11, 13)
- Wez Clarke – mixing (8)
- Sam Romans – mixing (14)
- Robbie Nelson – engineering (1, 2, 4, 6–8, 11–13)
- Chris Laws – engineering (3)
- Dann Pursey – engineering (3)
- Jack Ruston – engineering (4, 7, 13)
- Ben Kohn – engineering (5)
- Graham Archer – engineering (5)
- Peter Kelleher – engineering (5)
- Tom Barnes – engineering (5)
- Cameron Gower Poole – engineering (9, 11)
- Chris Bolster – engineering (15)
- Richard Evans – engineering (15)
- Mark Gustafson – mixing assistance (1, 2, 4, 7)
- Sam Klempner – additional engineering (5)
- Felix Joseph – additional engineering (9)
- Isabel Seeliger Morley – engineering assistance (1, 2)
- Manon Grandjean – engineering assistance (1, 14)
- Tom Campbell – engineering assistance (5)
- Rob Brinkmann – engineering assistance (6–8, 12)
- Che Jackson – engineering assistance (11)

Visuals

- Frank Fieber – artwork, design
- Olivia Bee – photography

== Charts ==
=== Weekly charts ===
Weekly chart performance for Beautiful Lies
Chart (2016)	Peak position
Australian Albums (ARIA)	10
Austrian Albums (Ö3 Austria)	11
Belgian Albums (Ultratop Flanders)	7
Belgian Albums (Ultratop Wallonia)	8
Canadian Albums (Billboard)	22
Dutch Albums (Album Top 100)	8
French Albums (SNEP)	10
German Albums (Offizielle Top 100)	7
Hungarian Albums (MAHASZ)	4
Irish Albums (IRMA)	5
Italian Albums (FIMI)	57
New Zealand Albums (RMNZ)	15
Polish Albums (ZPAV)	39
Portuguese Albums (AFP)	45
Scottish Albums (Official Charts)	4
Spanish Albums (Promusicae)	28
Swiss Albums (Schweizer Hitparade)	2
UK Albums (Official Charts)	4
US Billboard 200	68
US Top Alternative Albums (Billboard)	5
US Top Rock Albums (Billboard)	9
US Americana/Folk Albums (Billboard)	1

=== Year-end charts ===
Year-end chart performance for Beautiful Lies
Chart (2016)	Position
Belgian Albums (Ultratop Flanders)	78
Belgian Albums (Ultratop Wallonia)	89
Swiss Albums (Schweizer Hitparade)	68
UK Albums (OCC)	95

== Certifications ==
Certifications for Beautiful Lies
Region	Certification	Certified units/sales
New Zealand (RMNZ)	Platinum	15,000^{‡}
United Kingdom (BPI)	Gold	100,000^{‡}
^{‡} Sales+streaming figures based on certification alone.
