= Words as Weapons =

Words as Weapons may refer to:

- "Words as Weapons" (Seether song), a 2014 song by South African rock band Seether
- "Words as Weapons" (Birdy song), a 2014 song by English musician Birdy
