= Light Me Up (disambiguation) =

Light Me Up is a 2010 album by the Pretty Reckless.

Light Me Up also may refer to:

== Albums ==
- Lite Me Up, an album (and a track) by Herbie Hancock (2013)
- Light Me Up, an album by Bronze Radio Return (2015)

== Songs ==
- "Light Me Up" (Birdy song), 2015
- "Light Me Up" (Gromee song), a song by Polish music producer Gromee
- "Light Me Up" (Hunter Hayes song), 2013
- "Light Me Up", by AB6IX, from B Complete, 2019
- "Light Me Up", by Kristian Bush, from Southern Gravity, 2015
- "Light Me Up", by Godley and Creme, from The History Mix Volume 1, 1985
- "Light Me Up", by Icona Pop, from This Is... Icona Pop, 2013
- "Light Me Up", by South Korean pop group Red Velvet from their second extended play, The Velvet

== See also ==
- "Light My Fire", a song by the American rock band the Doors
