= Morning (Rhodes EP) =

2014 EP by Rhodes

EP by Rhodes
- Released: 11 May 2014
- Genre: Indie pop, soul
- Length: 12:53
- Label: Rhodes Music; Ministry of Sound
- Producer: Ian Grimble, Tim Bran, Roy Kerr, David Rhodes

Rhodes chronology
Raise Your Love (2013)	Morning (2014)	Home (2014)

Morning is the second EP by English singer-songwriter Rhodes. It was first released in the United Kingdom on 11 May 2014, through his own label Rhodes Music. A year after being discovered by BBC Music Introducing, Rhodes featured at BBC Radio 1's Big Weekend in Glasgow, where he featured the song "Your Soul" which subsequently was included on his debut studio album, Wishes in 2015. In production of the EP, he collaborated with producers James Kenosha and Tim Bran, who has also worked on his debut EP Raise Your Love in 2013.

== Reception ==
Hannah Taylor of London on the Inside said, “Silkier than Sam Smith and with plenty of lovable tones in his majestic vocal quality, David Rhodes is the beautifully chilled and fresh new voice on our airwaves.”

In her review for NME, Rhian Daly says, “with overblown yet still oddly cold swirls of Coldplay-ish echo on the aforementioned song (Your Soul), and early Elbow-esque drum patter on ‘Bloom’, things quickly get generically emotional-epic.”

Shea Corrigan writes in The Line of Best Fit, “Full of emotion and angst, in the best possible way, “Morning” ebbs and flows on the back of Rhodes’ decidedly serious and earnest tone.”

== Track listing ==
No.	Title	Length
1.	"Your Soul"	3:51
2.	"Sway"	3:11
3.	"Bloom"	2:15
4.	"Morning"	3:38
Total length:		12:15

== In other media ==
- “Your Soul” featured in series 7 episode 4 of Ambulance
- “Your Soul” featured in series 2 episode 14 of Reign
- “Bloom” featured in series 1 episode 8 of The Shannara Chronicles

== Personnel ==
- David Rhodes – lead vocals, guitar
- Reuben Wu – Artwork
- Jasper Dent - Engineer
