= Matt Ryder =

Matt Ryder is a British musician. Born in Birmingham, Ryder is now based in London. He is a renowned songwriter and producer across genres. Best known for his EDM collaborations and Indie Electronic solo work.

Ryder has collaborated across electronic music since 2019 most recently featuring on A Feeling I Miss With grammy award winning, Cassian. He is also rumoured to be working across dance music, Teasing music with Influential artists such as Kevin De Vries and Colyn.

On 3 December 2021, Ryder released the EP Escape. On 5 August 2022, Ryder released Riverbed. The song features vocals from both Ryder and Birdy.

== Discography ==
=== Singles ===
- Not The Same (2020)
- A New Way Home (2021)
- Lips (2021)
- Riverbed (2022)
- Animal EP
- A Feeling I Miss
