= 1901 (song) =

2009 single by Phoenix

Single by Phoenix

from the album Wolfgang Amadeus Phoenix
- B-side: Memory Tapes Remix; "Love Like a Sunset" (Animal Collective Remix)
- Released: 23 February 2009
- Recorded: 2008
- Studio: Motorbass (Paris)
- Genre: Synth-rock; dance-rock
- Length: 3:13
- Label: V2; Loyauté; Glassnote
- Songwriters: Thomas Pablo Croquet; Christian Mazzalai; Laurent Brancowitz; Frederic Moulin
- Producers: Phoenix; Philippe Zdar

Phoenix singles chronology
"Consolation Prizes" (2006)	"1901" (2009)	"Lisztomania" (2009)

"1901" is a song by French indie pop band Phoenix. It was released in 2009 as the lead single from their fourth studio album, Wolfgang Amadeus Phoenix (2009). It peaked at number 73 in Canada and number 84 in the United States, making "1901" the band's first song to chart there. Furthermore, it also reached number one on the US Alternative Songs chart. The song has been covered by English singer Birdy and also featured in the UK comedy series Friday Night Dinner.

== Origin and description ==
It was released in February 2009 as the album's lead single, originally as a free download from the band's official website, but was issued as a retail single due to the song's popularity. A black-and-white music video for the song was released in May. In July, the song entered the U.S. Billboard Alternative Songs chart, where it later reached number one, becoming only the fourth independent label single to achieve the feat. The single was reissued in the UK in February 2010. According to lead singer Thomas Mars, the song is about Belle Époque Paris. Mars said, "Paris in 1901 was better than it is now. So the song is a fantasy about Paris."

Phoenix performed "1901" on television programs such as The Tonight Show with Conan O'Brien, Late Show with David Letterman, Saturday Night Live, and MTV's It's On with Alexa Chung.

== Critical reception ==
The song has received very positive reviews from music critics; Pitchfork's Jason Crock chose the song as a "Best New Track" and added that it's "just as smooth and spirited and dementedly catchy as any of their best singles". The Village Voice's Pazz & Jop critics' poll ranked "1901" at number two to find the best music of 2009, after Jay-Z's "Empire State of Mind". In October 2009, "1901" ranked number 228 in Pitchfork's list of The Top 500 Tracks of the 2000s, the fifth-highest placement on the list amongst 2009 songs. The NME's Gavin Haynes praised the song's "rave-like stop-go guitars", while Evan Sawdey of PopMatters said it might be Phoenix's "finest song to date". Philadelphia Inquirer music critic Dan DeLuca described the song as "joyously exultant riff-happy pop". The song was ranked number two on Spin magazine's list of the 20 Best Summer Songs of 2009.

=== Usage in media ===
The song was featured in a couple commercials in 2009 for the second generation 2010 Cadillac SRX.

The intro of the song was featured heavily in the 2011 British sitcom Friday Night Dinner as intermission music between scenes.

The song was featured in the 2011 video game Test Drive Unlimited 2 as a song on the in-game radio station, RoadRock. It was also featured in the 2012 racing video game Forza Horizon, NHL 2K10, NBA 2K13, and NBA 2K26.

In 2024, Phoenix performed the song at the 2024 Summer Olympics closing ceremony in Paris.

== Track listing ==
Promo CD single

1. "1901" – 3:13

== Charts ==
For the week ending 19 December 2009, "1901" debuted on the Billboard Hot 100 chart at number 90. It peaked at number 84 for the week ending 23 January 2010. The single reached number 73 on the Canadian Hot 100. The single topped the Billboard alternative chart for two weeks and became the second-longest-running song on the chart at the time, at 57 weeks.

Chart (2009–2010)	Peak position
Canada (Canadian Hot 100)	73
Canada Rock (Canadian Rock)	28
UK Physical Singles (OCC)	31
US Billboard Hot 100	84
US Alternative Songs (Billboard)	1
US Rock Songs (Billboard)	3
US Adult Alternative Songs (Billboard)	6
US Adult Top 40 (Billboard)	34

== Certifications ==
Region	Certification	Certified units/sales
New Zealand (RMNZ)	Platinum	30,000^{‡}
United Kingdom (BPI)	Silver	200,000^{‡}
United States (RIAA)	Platinum	1,000,000^{*}
^{*} Sales figures based on certification alone.^{‡} Sales+streaming figures based on certification alone.

== Accolades ==
Publication	Country	Accolade	Year	Rank
Spin	U.S.	Best Songs of 2009	2009	2
Pitchfork Media	U.S.	Top 100 Tracks of 2009	2009	3
Slant Magazine	U.S.	Top 25 Songs of 2009	2009	3
Consequence	U.S.	Top 50 Songs of 2009	2009	1
Rolling Stone	U.S.	Best Songs of 2009	2009	5
Rolling Stone	U.S.	Best Songs of the Decade	2009	80
Pitchfork	U.S.	Top 500 Tracks of the 2000s	2009	228
Triple J	Australia	Hottest 100 Countdown 2009	2010	13

== Birdy version ==
"1901"

Single by Birdy

from the album Birdy
- Released: 9 March 2012
- Recorded: 2011
- Genre: Indie folk
- Length: 5:11
- Label: Warner
- Songwriters: Thomas Pablo Croquet; Christian Mazzalai; Laurent Mazzalai; Frederic Moulin
- Producer: Rich Costey

Birdy singles chronology
"People Help the People" (2011)	"1901" (2012)	"Wings" (2013)

English singer Birdy released a cover version of the song on 9 March 2012, as a digital download in the United Kingdom.

=== Music video ===
The music video for "1901" was uploaded to YouTube on 25 October 2009. Featured artists include Helen George and Ian Roe.

=== Track listing ===
Digital download
No.	Title	Length
1.	"1901"	5:11

=== Charts ===
Chart (2012)	Peak position
Belgium (Ultratip Bubbling Under Flanders)	12
Belgium (Ultratip Bubbling Under Wallonia)	11

=== Release history ===
Country	Date	Format	Label
United Kingdom	9 March 2012	Digital download	Warner

== See also ==
- List of Billboard number-one alternative singles of the 2010s
