= No Angel (Birdy song) =

Single by Birdy

from the album Fire Within
- Released: 18 September 2013
- Recorded: 2012–2013
- Length: 4:03
- Label: Warner
- Songwriter(s): Jasmine van den Bogaerde; Ben Lovett
- Producer(s): Jim Abbiss

Birdy singles chronology
"Wings" (2013)	"No Angel" (2013)	"Light Me Up" (2014)

Live video
- "No Angel" on YouTube

"No Angel" is a song by English musician Birdy. The song was released as a digital download on 18 September 2013 in the United Kingdom, as the second single from her second studio album, Fire Within (2013). The song was written by Birdy and Ben Lovett and produced by Jim Abbiss. The song has charted in France and the Netherlands.

== Track listing ==
Digital download
No.	Title	Length
1.	"No Angel"	4:03

== Charts ==
Chart performance for "No Angel"
Chart (2013)	Peak position
France (SNEP)	168
Netherlands (Single Top 100)	51
South Korea (Gaon)	156

== Release history ==
Region	Date	Format	Version	Label
United Kingdom	18 September 2013	Digital download	Warner Music Group	
