= Portraits (Birdy album) =

Studio album by Birdy
- Released: 18 August 2023
- Genre: Pop; synth-pop
- Length: 40:19
- Label: Atlantic
- Producer: Birdy; Anya Jones; King Ed; Barney Lister; Dan Priddy; Mark Crew; Gabe Simon; Bullion

Birdy chronology
Young Heart (2021)	Portraits (2023)

Singles from Portraits
- 1. "Raincatchers" Released: 3 March 2023; 2. "Heartbreaker" Released: 21 April 2023; 3. "Your Arms" Released: 9 June 2023; 4. "Paradise Calling" Released: 12 July 2023

Portraits is the fifth studio album by English singer-songwriter Birdy, released on 18 August 2023 by Atlantic Records. It peaked at number thirteen on the UK Albums Chart.

== Background ==
On 30 April 2021, Birdy's fourth studio album, Young Heart, was released to critical acclaim. The accompanying Young Heart Tour took place in March and April 2023 with a total of 19 shows. The writing and recording process for Young Heart took place over the course of five years, but coming into her fifth studio album, Birdy had the intention to shorten the songwriting and recording process. This was done in order for Birdy to be able to tour in 2023 just after the release of a new album. On 6 March 2023, Portraits was announced to be releasing on 14 July 2023. It was later announced that the album would be delayed by one month to 18 August.

== Composition ==
Portraits is an alternative album incorporating elements of pop and synthpop. It is a departure musically from the previous indie folk and folk-pop sound and stripped-back production established on Young Heart (2021). Birdy said she wanted to step out of her musical comfort zone with Portraits by writing more uptempo songs rather than piano-led ballads. This was due to her experience of a "painful process" during the recording of Young Heart due to the nature of that album. Portraits made use of synths and drum machines. Birdy took inspiration from 1980s artists such as Prince, David Bowie, Madonna and Kate Bush and "more Gothic feeling" from the music of PJ Harvey and Portishead.

Birdy said that "I Wish I Was a Shooting Star" is her favourite track from the album and cited David Bowie and the Pixies as sonic influences for the track. It was written and recorded in Nashville with Gabe Simon.

== Singles ==
The first single to debut from Portraits was "Raincatchers" which released on 3 March 2023. Writing for Rolling Stone, Tom Skinner described the track as having an "'80s alt-pop sound, complete with thunderous drums and a power vocal delivery". The sound of "Raincatchers" was compared to Kate Bush's 1985 song "Cloudbusting". The music video for "Raincatchers" was directed by Max McLachlan and features Eleanor Hockley as a young Birdy. McLachlan wanted the video, through portraying a younger Birdy interact with an older Birdy, to show how Birdy had "years of youth lost having to play grown-up in the industry". Birdy began her music career as a teenager but the emphasises that "Birdy is not a kid anymore" and has grown throughout her musical career according to McLachlan. The second single from Portraits, titled "Heartbreaker", was released on 21 April 2023.

"Your Arms" was released on 9 June 2023 as the third single from the album. It is a break from the alt-pop sounds of the previous two singles, incorporating piano and orchestral arrangements. Birdy said that it was written "for someone very close to me" and deals with "the pain of forgetting things about someone you loved and lost but remembering being in their arms". The final single to be released from Portraits came on 12 July 2023 with "Paradise Calling". Clash reviewed "Paradise Calling" positively, praising the "cleverly crafted" track's "nostalgic pop melody".

== Critical reception ==
Portraits ratings
Review scores
Source	Rating
Evening Standard	3/5 stars
Gigwise	8/10 stars
The Guardian	4/5 stars
iNews	4/5 stars
The Irish Times	3.5/5 stars
The Line of Best Fit	8/10
The Upcoming	5/5 stars
Whynow	4/5 stars

Portraits received mostly positive reviews from critics. Many reviews commended Birdy's willingness to reinvent herself as an artist. Gigwise wrote that Birdy is "stepping into her true artistic self" as she gives herself greater artistic liberty in not following the expectations of piano ballads that came with previous Birdy albums. It is this "willingness to explore reinvention that sees Portraits at its best".

Éamon Sweeney's review in The Irish Times assessed Portraits to be "an assured album from an artist who is very comfortable in both her sound and her skin" with praise for Birdy's unique pop interpretation and her voice still being upfront. He concluded that it is "her strongest record yet". Rachel Aroesti of The Guardian positively received the album's 1980s pop nostalgia and named "Paradise Calling", "I Wish I Was A Shooting Star" and "Your Arms" as standouts. Writing for The Line of Best Fit, Lana Williams called the album as Birdy's "most confident and exploratory project to date" and "an exemplary display of [her] prowess as both a musician, and a songwriter". Williams' review recommended listening to sister tracks "Ruins I" and "Ruins II" as a sequential pair rather than as the third and eighth tracks in the album's tracklisting. Additionally, the "delicate piano notes and soothing vocals" on the track "Your Arms" received praise for harkening back to the style of Birdy's second album Fire Within.

Lucy Harbon, writing for the website Whynow, considered Portraits to be complete "reintroduction" to Birdy as a musical artist due to its significant change in direction which makes the album "her boldest record yet". In a review for iNews, Kate Soloman similarly praised the alt-pop direction taken by Birdy with Portraits. Portraits is a "refreshing, exciting direction" according to Soloman, who highlighted the "operatic quality" of Birdy's voice that makes for an album that is "sweeping and dramatic". However, she criticised the album for "sometimes lack[ing] its own identity" due to how proud it wears its 1980s influences. A more lukewarm review from the Evening Standard claimed that the album does not go far enough in embracing its 1980s alt-pop direction. In the view of writer David Smyth, the track "Paradise Calling" opens the album with "more energy than she has in over a decade of music" but the following tracks on the album are mid-paced and fail to capture the energy of the album opener.

== Track listing ==
Portraits tracklisting
No.	Title	Writer(s)	Producer(s)	Length
1.	"Paradise Calling"	Jasmine Van den Bogaerde; Anya Louise Jones; Edward James Carlile	Anya Jones; Birdy; King Ed	3:06
2.	"Raincatchers"	Van den Bogaerde; Jones; Barney Lister	Birdy; Lister	4:00
3.	"Ruins I"	Van den Bogaerde; Jones; Carlile	Birdy; King Ed	4:07
4.	"Your Arms"	Van den Bogaerde; Dan Priddy; Mark Crew	Birdy	3:51
5.	"Heartbreaker"	Van den Bogaerde; Priddy; Crew; Andrew Jackson	Priddy; Crew	3:04
6.	"I Wish I Was A Shooting Star"	Van den Bogaerde; Gabe Simon	Birdy; Simon	3:37
7.	"Portraits"	Van den Bogaerde; Simon	Birdy; Simon	3:53
8.	"Ruins II"	Van den Bogaerde; Jones; Carlile	Birdy; King Ed	4:10
9.	"Automatic"	Van den Bogaerde; Crew; Priddy; Simon	Crew; Priddy; Simon	3:07
10.	"Battlefield"	Van den Bogaerde; Jones	Birdy; Jones; Bullion	3:55
11.	"Tears Don't Fall"	Van den Bogaerde; Jones; Carlile	Birdy; King Ed	3:29
Total length:				40:19

== Charts ==
Chart performance for Portraits
Chart (2023)	Peak position
Austrian Albums (Ö3 Austria)	42
Belgian Albums (Ultratop Flanders)	28
Belgian Albums (Ultratop Wallonia)	37
French Albums (SNEP)	102
German Albums (Offizielle Top 100)	18
Hungarian Albums (MAHASZ)	40
Scottish Albums (OCC)	5
Swiss Albums (Schweizer Hitparade)	10
UK Albums (OCC)	13

== Release history ==
Release dates and formats for Portraits
Region	Date	Format(s)	Label	Ref.
Various	18 August 2023	CD; digital download; LP; streaming	Atlantic	
