= Raincatchers =

2023 single by Birdy

Single by Birdy

from the album Portraits
- Released: 18 August 2023
- Genre: Alt-pop
- Length: 4:00
- Label: Atlantic
- Songwriters: Jasmine Van den Bogaerde; Anya Louise Jones; Barney Lister
- Producers: Birdy; Barney Lister

Birdy singles chronology
"Walking in the Air" (2022)	"Raincatchers" (2023)	"Heartbreaker" (2023)

Music video
- "Raincatchers" on YouTube

"Raincatchers" is a song by English singer-songwriter Birdy. It was released on 18 August 2023 as the lead single from her fifth studio album, Portraits (2023). "Raincatchers" marks Birdy's first release since her December cover of "Walking in the Air". The music video was directed by Max McLachlan.

== Composition ==
"Raincatchers" opens with an orchestral motif and incorporates elements of '80s-inspired alt-pop, featuring prominent drums and expressive vocals, with lyrics reflecting themes of nostalgia and escape. Clash described the track as timeless and enigmatic, drawing comparisons to Kate Bush and highlighting Birdy's vivid vocal delivery.
