= Wild Horses (Birdy song) =

Single by Birdy

from the album Beautiful Lies
- Released: 11 March 2016
- Recorded: 2015
- Genre: Baroque pop; indie folk
- Length: 3:05
- Label: Warner
- Songwriters: Jasmine van den Bogaerde; John McDaid
- Producers: TMS; Phil Cook

Birdy singles chronology
"Keeping Your Head Up" (2016)	"Wild Horses" (2016)	"Words" (2016)

Music video
- "Wild Horses" on YouTube

"Wild Horses" is a song by English recording artist Birdy from her third studio album, Beautiful Lies (2016). It was released for digital download on 11 March 2016 in the United Kingdom, as the second single from the album. The song was written by Birdy and John McDaid and produced by TMS and Phil Cook.

== Music video ==
The music video for "Wild Horses" was directed by Francis Wallis and filmed at the Underwater Studio in Basildon, England. A dreamy, fantastical performance video, set in an underwater vision, it sees the singer transformed into an ethereal mermaid who encounters a deep sea diver. The video was premiered online on 11 March 2016.

== Track listing ==
Digital download
No.	Title	Length
1.	"Wild Horses"	3:05

Digital download
No.	Title	Length
1.	"Wild Horses (Matrix & Futurebound Remix)"	4:05

== Charts ==
Chart performance for "Wild Horses"
Chart (2016)	Peak position
Belgium (Ultratop 50 Flanders)	42
Belgium (Ultratop 50 Wallonia)	25
Scotland Singles (OCC)	33
UK Singles (OCC)	75

== Release history ==
Region	Date	Format	Version	Label
United Kingdom	11 March 2016	Digital download	Original	Warner Music Group
United Kingdom	15 April 2016	Digital Download	Matrix & Futurebound remix	Warner Music Group
