= Fire Within (Birdy album) =

- Standard edition (Note: The deluxe edition features the greyscale picture of Birdy in a bluish color.)

Studio album by Birdy
- Released: 16 September 2013
- Recorded: 2012–2013
- Length: 43:43
- Label: 14th Floor; Atlantic
- Producer: Jim Abbiss; Rich Costey; Alex H. N. Gilbert; Jake Gosling; John Hill; Ben Lovett; Jamie Muhoberac; Eric Rosse; Fraser T Smith; Ryan Tedder; Dan Wilson; Greg Wells

Birdy chronology
Birdy (2011)	Fire Within (2013)	Breathe (2013)

Singles from Fire Within
- 1. "Wings" Released: 29 July 2013; 2. "No Angel" Released: 23 September 2013; 3. "Light Me Up" Released: 23 February 2014; 4. "Words as Weapons" Released: 14 April 2014

Fire Within is the second studio album by English musician Birdy, released on 16 September 2013 by 14th Floor and Atlantic Records. It is her first album of predominantly original compositions, as her eponymous debut album consisted largely of covers. Birdy collaborated with several producers including Jim Abbiss, Rich Costey, Jake Gosling, John Hill, Ben Lovett, Eric Rosse, Fraser T Smith, Ryan Tedder, Dan Wilson and Greg Wells during its recording. The album includes the singles "Wings", "No Angel", "Light Me Up" and "Words as Weapons".

Fire Within received generally positive reviews from music critics. In North America, Fire Within was released on 3 June 2014. Prior to that, several album tracks and live versions of past songs were released as a US-only EP titled Breathe on 24 September 2013. It reached the top ten of the charts in over ten countries, including the United Kingdom.

== Background and recording ==
"It's an album of all originals and for me, that is very exciting! It's what I've always wanted to do. I had never thought of doing covers before "Skinny Love" so that was a different experience." [...] It was my first time co-writing and it was really weird because I've always been a writer on my own. It's weird to be open with someone you just met but I learned a lot and I love what we made."

— Birdy on Fire Within.

Following the commercial success of her debut album Birdy (2011), Birdy decided for her second record to be mostly of original compositions instead of covering songs like in her previous album. She noted that she began writing songs aged eight, and considers this album "very special" for her. She also talked about her experience as a songwriter: "A lot of people thought [she couldn't write] but then it was good doing it by stealth so I could develop my own writing and have time to work on it."

For Fire Within Birdy worked with various musicians during its recording including Ryan Tedder, Dan Wilson, Rich Costey, Ben Lovett from the British folk rock band Mumford & Sons, Tim Commerford from American rock band Rage Against the Machine, Paul Jackson Jr. and Omar Hakim. She released a preview of the recording of the album through YouTube alongside the album's release date. Birdy cited the changes of routine and relationships she had after her breakthrough work as a primarily influence for the album.

== Critical reception ==
Fire Within ratings
Aggregate scores
Source	Rating
Metacritic	66/100
Review scores
Source	Rating
AllMusic	3.5/5 stars
Contactmusic	4/5 stars
Daily Echo	9/10
Digital Spy	3/5 stars
Hot Press	3.5/5 stars
The Independent	3/5 stars
Mail & Guardian	3/5 stars
Mojo	2/5 stars
MusicOMH	3/5 stars
PopMatters	7/10
Time Out London	3/5 stars

Fire Within received generally positive reviews from music critics. At Metacritic, which assigns a weighted mean rating out of 100 to reviews from mainstream critics, the album received an average score of 66, based on seven reviews, which indicates "generally favorable reviews".

AllMusic praised the album as "a testament to [Birdy's] confidence in her own songwriting talent", while also highlighting the "fragility and intensity of her pure, unblemished vocals". Digital Spy noted that despite contributions from high-profile writers such as Fraser T. Smith, Sia, Dan Wilson, Ben Lovett, and Ryan Tedder, "these songs very much sound like Birdy's own". While acknowledging that the album "won't change your life" and includes "far too much meandering in the middle", the review concluded that it doesn't need to be groundbreaking to be effective. Hot Press offered a more critical perspective, questioning the authenticity behind the project, suggesting that it had been "ruthlessly machine-tooled by off-stage actors", namely Birdy's record label. The Independent described Fire Within as Birdy's "she's not a little girl anymore" album, emphasizing her involvement in writing or co-writing every track and noting the album's more mature presentation.

== Track listing ==
Fire Within – Standard edition
No.	Title	Writer(s)	Producer(s)	Length
1.	"Wings"	Jasmine van den Bogaerde; Ryan Tedder	Rich Costey; Tedder	4:12
2.	"Heart of Gold"	Van den Bogaerde	Costey; John Hill^{[a]}; Eric Rosse^{[a]}	3:34
3.	"Light Me Up"	Van den Bogaerde; Kid Harpoon	Costey; Hill^{[a]}	4:15
4.	"Words as Weapons"	Van den Bogaerde; Tedder	Tedder	3:59
5.	"All You Never Say"	Van den Bogaerde; Dan Wilson	Jim Abbiss	4:38
6.	"Strange Birds"	Van den Bogaerde; Sia Furler; Ariel Rechtshaid	Abbiss; Alex H. N. Gilbert^{[b]}	3:03
7.	"Maybe"	Van den Bogaerde; Wilson	Abbiss; Wilson^{[a]}	3:14
8.	"No Angel"	Van den Bogaerde; Ben Lovett	Abbiss	4:03
9.	"All About You"	Van den Bogaerde; Wilson	Abbiss; Costey^{[a]}	4:37
10.	"Standing in the Way of the Light"	Van den Bogaerde; Fraser T Smith	Smith	4:04
11.	"Shine"	Van den Bogaerde	Abbiss	4:04
Total length:				43:43

Fire Within – Deluxe edition (bonus tracks)
No.	Title	Writer(s)	Producer(s)	Length
12.	"The Same"	Van den Bogaerde; Greg Wells	Wells	3:29
13.	"Dream"	Van den Bogaerde; Lovett	Lovett; Gilbert^{[a]}; Jamie Muhoberac^{[a]}	1:52
14.	"Older"	Van den Bogaerde	Gilbert	3:57
15.	"Home"	Van den Bogaerde; Jake Gosling	Gosling	3:36
Total length:				56:37

Fire Within – North American edition
No.	Title	Writer(s)	Producer(s)	Length
1.	"Skinny Love"	Justin Vernon	Gilbert	3:23
2.	"Wings"	Van den Bogaerde; Tedder	Costey; Tedder	4:12
3.	"Heart of Gold"	Van den Bogaerde	Costey	3:34
4.	"Light Me Up" (US version)	Van den Bogaerde; Harpoon	Costey; Tedder; Jerrod Bettis	3:59
5.	"Words as Weapons" (US version)	Van den Bogaerde; Tedder	Tedder	3:41
6.	"All You Never Say" (US version)	Van den Bogaerde; Wilson	Hill; Wilson	4:28
7.	"Strange Birds"	Van den Bogaerde; Furler; Rechtshaid	Abbiss	3:03
8.	"Maybe"	Van den Bogaerde; Wilson	Abbiss	3:14
9.	"No Angel"	Van den Bogaerde; Lovett	Abbiss	4:03
10.	"All About You"	Van den Bogaerde; Wilson	Abbiss	4:37
11.	"Standing in the Way of the Light"	Van den Bogaerde; Smith	Smith	4:04
12.	"Shine"	Van den Bogaerde	Abbiss	4:04
13.	"People Help the People"	Simon Aldred	James Ford	4:16
Total length:				50:38

=== Notes ===
- ^{^[a]} signifies an additional producer.
- ^{^[b]} signifies a strings producer.

== Charts ==
=== Weekly charts ===
Weekly chart performance for Fire Within
Chart (2013–2014)	Peak position
Australian Albums (ARIA)	5
Austrian Albums (Ö3 Austria)	7
Belgian Albums (Ultratop Flanders)	4
Belgian Albums (Ultratop Wallonia)	2
Canadian Albums (Billboard)	19
Danish Albums (Hitlisten)	31
Dutch Albums (Album Top 100)	3
Finnish Albums (Suomen virallinen lista)	48
French Albums (SNEP)	4
German Albums (Offizielle Top 100)	5
Hungarian Albums (MAHASZ)	6
Irish Albums (IRMA)	7
Italian Albums (FIMI)	73
New Zealand Albums (RMNZ)	5
Norwegian Albums (VG-lista)	30
Polish Albums (ZPAV)	18
Scottish Albums (OCC)	9
Spanish Albums (Promusicae)	41
Swiss Albums (Schweizer Hitparade)	1
UK Albums (OCC)	8
US Billboard 200	24
US Top Alternative Albums (Billboard)	5
US Top Rock Albums (Billboard)	5
US Americana/Folk Albums (Billboard)	1

=== Year-end charts ===
2013 year-end chart performance for Fire Within
Chart (2013)	Position
Belgian Albums (Ultratop Flanders)	33
Belgian Albums (Ultratop Wallonia)	25
Dutch Albums (Album Top 100)	66
French Albums (SNEP)	54
German Albums (Offizielle Top 100)	72
Hungarian Albums (MAHASZ)	54
Swiss Albums (Schweizer Hitparade)	34

2014 year-end chart performance for Fire Within
Chart (2014)	Position
Belgian Albums (Ultratop Flanders)	44
Belgian Albums (Ultratop Wallonia)	68
French Albums (SNEP)	195
Hungarian Albums (MAHASZ)	82
Swiss Albums (Schweizer Hitparade)	81
US Folk Albums (Billboard)	46

== Certifications ==
Certifications for Fire Within
Region	Certification	Certified units/sales
Australia (ARIA)	Gold	35,000^{^}
Austria (IFPI Austria)	Gold	7,500^{*}
France (SNEP)	Platinum	100,000^{*}
Germany (BVMI)	Gold	100,000^{^}
Hungary (MAHASZ)	Gold	1,000^{^}
Switzerland (IFPI Switzerland)	Gold	10,000^{^}
United Kingdom (BPI)	Gold	103,786
^{*} Sales figures based on certification alone.^{^} Shipments figures based on certification alone.
