= Keeping Your Head Up =

Single by Birdy

from the album Beautiful Lies
- Released: 30 December 2015
- Recorded: 2014
- Genre: Indie pop
- Length: 3:28
- Label: Atlantic
- Songwriters: Jasmine van den Bogaerde; Wayne Hector; Steve Mac
- Producers: Steve Mac; Jasmine van den Bogaerde

Birdy singles chronology
"Let It All Go" (2015)	"Keeping Your Head Up" (2015)	"Wild Horses" (2016)

Music video
- "Keeping Your Head Up" on YouTube

"Keeping Your Head Up" is a song by English musician Birdy for her third studio album, Beautiful Lies (2016). It was written by Wayne Hector, Steve Mac, and Birdy and produced by the latter two. The song was released as the album's lead single on 30 December 2015.

== Music video ==
A music video was first released onto Facebook on 28 January 2016 and a day after on YouTube at a total length of three minutes and thirty-six seconds. The video begins with Birdy lying down with her head on a large pillow, peering intently at the camera. The camera gradually gets closer to her eye, then this scene gives way to various scenes of Birdy and other people. Demons and angels appear in her way throughout the video. At the end, Birdy is again shown lying down with her head on the pillow. The video was directed by Chris Turner (Favourite Color Black).

== In popular culture ==
The song is featured in the international trailer for the 2019 film Last Christmas.

== Charts ==
=== Weekly charts ===
Weekly chart performance for "Keeping Your Head Up"
Chart (2016)	Peak position
Austria (Ö3 Austria Top 40)	44
Belgium (Ultratop 50 Flanders)	47
Belgium (Ultratop 50 Wallonia)	46
France (SNEP)	27
Germany (GfK)	34
Hungary (Rádiós Top 40)	4
Hungary (Single Top 40)	25
Ireland (IRMA)	48
Japan Hot 100 (Billboard)	88
Netherlands (Single Top 100)	64
Scotland Singles (OCC)	27
Switzerland (Schweizer Hitparade)	47
UK Singles (OCC)	57
US Hot Rock & Alternative Songs (Billboard)	33

=== Year-end charts ===
Year-end chart performance for "Keeping Your Head Up"
Chart (2016)	Position
Hungary (Rádiós Top 40)	11

== Certifications ==
Certifications for "Keeping Your Head Up"
Region	Certification	Certified units/sales
Australia (ARIA)	Platinum	70,000^{‡}
France (SNEP)	Gold	100,000^{‡}
Germany (BVMI)	Gold	200,000^{‡}
New Zealand (RMNZ)	Platinum	30,000^{‡}
Poland (ZPAV)	Gold	25,000^{‡}
United Kingdom (BPI)	Platinum	600,000^{‡}
^{‡} Sales+streaming figures based on certification alone.

== Release history ==
Region	Date	Format	Version	Label
United Kingdom	30 December 2015	Digital download	Atlantic	
