= Words as Weapons (Birdy song) =

Single by Birdy

from the album Fire Within
- Released: 14 April 2014
- Recorded: 2012–13
- Genre: Indie folk
- Length: 3:41
- Label: Warner Music Group
- Songwriter(s): Jasmine van den Bogaerde; Ryan Tedder
- Producer(s): Ryan Tedder

Birdy singles chronology
"Light Me Up" (2014)	"Words as Weapons" (2014)	"Let It All Go" (2015)

Music video
- "Words as Weapons" on YouTube

"Words as Weapons" is a song by English musician Birdy. It was released as a digital download on 14 April 2014 in the United Kingdom, as the fourth single from her second studio album, Fire Within (2013). The song was written by Birdy and Ryan Tedder, who also produced the song.

== Music video ==
The music video for the song was released on YouTube on March 27, 2014. It features Birdy as a ghost haunting her ex-boyfriend for his abusive behavior.

== Track listing ==
Digital download
No.	Title	Length
1.	"Words as Weapons"	3:41

== Charts ==
Chart performance for "Words as Weapons"
Chart (2014)	Peak position
Belgium (Ultratip Bubbling Under Flanders)	39
France (SNEP)	125
Germany (GfK)	63

== Release history ==
Region	Date	Format	Label
United Kingdom	14 April 2014	Digital download	Warner Music Group
