= 2012 Champs-Élysées Film Festival =

- Official poster of the 1st Champs-Élysées Film Festival
- Closing film: The Parade
- Location: Paris, France
- Founded: 2012
- Awards: Audience Prize: Best American Independent Feature-Length Film (Marina Abramovic: The Artist Is Present)
- Hosted by: Lambert Wilson & Michael Madsen
- No. of films: 10 (Feature-Length Films in Competition); 15 (French Short Films in Competition); 14 (American Short Films in Competition)
- Festival date: 6 – 12 June 2012
- Website: champselyseesfilmfestival.com

The first edition of the Champs-Élysées Film Festival was held from 6 to 12 June 2012, with actors Lambert Wilson and Michael Madsen presiding. During the first edition, more than 15,000 people attended, with more than 50 films screened. Besides the Official Selection of American Independent Films, the Festival's main event, three other non-competitive selections were presented: French Galas, American Galas and Oscar Nominated Foreign Language Films. A competitive Official Shorts Selection was also showcased. A tribute to Harvey Weinstein was held to celebrate his career and a retrospective of 11 of his films was shown throughout the week. Three Audience Prizes (Best American Feature-Length Film, Best American Short Film, Best French Short Film) were presented during the Closing Ceremony, held at the Publicis Cinema.

== Official Selection ==
=== American Independent Feature-Length Films ===
- Jesus Henry Christ, directed by Dennis Lee
- Blank City, directed by Céline Danhier
- Peace, Love & Misunderstanding, directed by Bruce Beresford
- Bernie, directed by Richard Linklater
- Tabloïd, directed by Errol Morris
- The Perfect Family, directed by Anne Renton
- Keep the Lights On, directed by Ira Sachs
- LUV directed by Sheldon Candis
- Marina Abramovic: The Artist Is Present, directed by Matthew Akers
- Not Waving But Drowning, directed by Devyn Waitt

=== Short films ===
The Official Selection of Short Films comprises more than 30 films, which were selected by a French industry team as well as four major film school programs: University of Southern California's School of Cinematic Arts, New York University's Tisch School of the Arts and Columbia University's Columbia University Film Festival for the United States and Paris-based film school La Femis for France.

==== French Shorts Competitive Selection ====
French Shorts Selection

- Hurlement d'un Poisson, directed by Sébastien Carfora
- It's a Miracul’house, directed by Stéphane Freiss
- Les Meutes, directed by Manuel Schapira
- Mon Canard, directed by Emmanuelle Michelet & Vincent Fouquet
- Les Grossesses de Charlemagne, directed by Nicolas Slomka & Matthieu Rumani
- Plume, directed by Barry Purves
- Personne(s), directed by Marc Fouchard
- La Fille de l'Homme, directed by Manuel Schapira
- Kiss & Kill, directed by Alain Ross

La Femis Shorts Selection

- Goose, directed by Morgan Simon
- Demain Ce Sera Bien, directed by Pauline Gay
- On Tracks, directed by Laurent Navarri
- Bye Bye Wild Boy, directed by Julie Lena

==== American Shorts Competitive Selection ====
USC School of Cinematic Arts Shorts Selection

- Little Spoon, directed by Lauren Fash
- Ellen, directed by Kyle Hausmann-Stokes
- Efrain, directed by Matthew Breault
- Fig, directed by Ryan Coogler
- The Nature of Fall, directed by Tomer Stolz

New York University Tisch School of the Arts Shorts Selection

- Little Horse, directed by Levi Abrino
- Border Land, directed by Alexander Smolowe
- Premature, directed by Rashaad Ernesto Green
- Down in Number 5, directed by Kim Spurlock

Columbia University Film Festival Shorts Selection

- Rolling on the Floor Laughing, directed by Rusel Harbaugh
- Motherland, directed by Shario Siddiqui
- Hatch, directed by Christoph Kusching
- Crossing, directed by Gina Atwater
- Off Season, directed by Jonathan Van Tulleken
- The Hirosaki Players, directed by Jeff Sousa

=== US in Progress Official Selection ===
- A Teacher, directed by Hannah Fidell
- I am I directed by Jocelyn Towne
- House of Last Things directed by Michael Bartlett
- Desert Cathedral, directed by Travis Gutiérrez Senger

== Awards ==
Audience Prizes

- Best American Independent Film: Marina Abramovic: The Artist Is Present, directed by Matthew Akers
- Best American Short Film: Motherland, directed by Shariq Siddiqui
- Best French Short Film: It's Miracul'house, directed by Stéphane Freiss

US in Progress

- US in Progress Paris Award: A Teacher, directed by Hannah Fidell
- Special Mention: I am I directed by Jocelyn Towne

== Festival theaters ==
- Le Balzac
- Gaumont Champs-Elysées
- Le Lincoln
- Publicis Cinéma
- UGC George V
