= Shelter (The xx song) =

Song by The xx

Song by The xx

from the album xx
- Released: 14 August 2009
- Recorded: 2009; XL Studios, West London
- Genre: Electronic
- Length: 4:30
- Label: Young Turks; XL
- Songwriter(s): Romy Madley Croft; Oliver Sim; Jamie Smith
- Producer(s): Jamie xx

"Shelter" is a song by English indie pop band The xx. It is the seventh track on their debut album, xx, and the only track from it that was written and performed without former member Baria Qureshi.

The song's lyrics were written by Romy Madley Croft, with the music written by her, Oliver Sim and Jamie Smith, and the song being produced by the latter.

In March 2022, a 2017 live remix of the song by Jamie xx was released.

== Composition ==
The band recorded the song in February 2009, alongside the tracks "Fantasy" and "Infinity" before finishing the album by the end of the month. While recording "Shelter", a mechanical part of the guitar amplifier loosened, resulting in a clattering sound, which Rodaidh McDonald, who was the engineer and the mixer for the album, and The xx decided to keep. "It was just like this missing piece of percussion that the track needed!", remarked McDonald.

== Birdy version ==
"Shelter"

Single by Birdy

from the album Birdy
- Released: 3 June 2011
- Recorded: 2010
- Genre: Indie folk
- Length: 3:44
- Label: Atlantic
- Songwriter(s): Oliver David Sim; Romy Anna Madley Croft; James Thomas Smith
- Producer(s): Jim Abbiss

Birdy singles chronology
"Skinny Love" (2011)	"Shelter" (2011)	"People Help the People" (2011)

English musician Birdy released a cover version of the song, which was released on 3 June 2011 as a download in the United Kingdom. The song was chosen as "Record of The Week" by UK radio DJ Fearne Cotton.

=== Music video ===
The music video was first uploaded on YouTube on 16 June 2011 at a length of three minutes and fifty-seven seconds. It features Birdy walking outside in the dark, with various shots of her sitting in a dark room or playing the piano. It currently has over 30 million views.

=== Track listing ===
No.	Title	Length
1.	"Shelter"	3:44

=== Charts ===
Chart (2011)	Peak position
Ireland (IRMA)	39
Scotland (Official Charts Company)	52
UK Singles (Official Charts Company)	50

== Other covers ==
The song has been covered multiple times by other artists, notably Hercules and Love Affair on their album Blue Songs. Sophie Habibis performed a cover in the style of the Birdy version on series 8 of The X Factor, but was eliminated the same day.
