= Young Heart =

Studio album by Birdy
- Released: 30 April 2021
- Recorded: 2019–2020
- Studios: Mill Pond Music Studio; Moxe Studio (Nashville, Tennessee); Sound Emporium (Nashville, Tennessee); Studio 53 (London); The Church (London)
- Length: 58:21
- Label: Atlantic
- Producers: Ian Fitchuk; Daniel Tashian; James Ford

Birdy chronology
Beautiful Lies (2016)	Young Heart (2021)	Portraits (2023)

Singles from Young Heart
- 1. "Surrender" Released: 22 January 2021; 2. "Loneliness" Released: 12 February 2021; 3. "Deepest Lonely" Released: 19 March 2021; 4. "Second Hand News" Released: 16 April 2021; 5. "Little Blue" Released: 8 July 2021

Young Heart is the fourth studio album by English singer-songwriter Birdy, released on 30 April 2021 by Atlantic Records. The album was announced on 22 January 2021 with the release of the first single "Surrender". The album was met with critical acclaim and reached number four on the UK Albums Chart.

== Background ==
While reaching the end of the tour for her 2016 album Beautiful Lies, she admits to feeling that she was "acting a little bit" and instead wanted to capture the more quiet and gentle aspects of how she normally writes and sings songs alone. In the four years after release of Beautiful Lies, Birdy took a break from releasing music, eventually reintroducing herself in November 2020 with the release of the EP Piano Sketches. In the period between Beautiful Lies and Young Heart, Birdy credits "writer's block" and the need for "some time to live a bit" as reasons why it took four years to finish the album.

Before writing for the album began, Birdy suffered from a breakup and looked to the music of Etta James and Nina Simone for emotional support. To get inspiration for writing and to shake the sadness of the breakup, Birdy took a three-month hiatus to India with her sister, cousin and their friend before staying in a log cabin in Topanga, California for inspiration. Staying in the cabin gave the album a "kind of Laurel Canyon, seventies-like feel" according to Birdy. The result is what she calls a "heartbreak album" inspired by the Joni Mitchell album Blue. The first track written for Young Heart was the title track "Young Heart" that acts as the "core of the record" and is the "most emotionally charged song" for Birdy. The track "Loneliness" in contrast was originally written for 2016's Beautiful Lies but was set aside at the time for not fitting into that album.

== Recording ==
In a departure from the "big production" of the previous album, Birdy said that Young Heart is "quite stripped back – anything that didn't need to be there, isn't. There's no decoration". To record the album, Birdy worked with producers Ian Fitchuk and Daniel Tashian who had previously worked on Kacey Musgraves' 2018 album Golden Hour.

The recording sessions for the album took place in Nashville. The recording of the album was completed just before the COVID-19 pandemic hit in March 2020 and the album was intended to be released soon thereafter. It was delayed as a result of the pandemic but this allowed greater time for Birdy to reflect on the album and make small changes accordingly. While staying at her family home in New Forest during the pandemic, she set up a makeshift mixer studio in a cupboard and was finishing bits of the record at home.

== Promotion ==
On 15 April 2021, Birdy performed a livestreamed concert at Wilton's Music Hall in London accompanied by a band including eight string players, a clarinet player and a French horn player. The show was shot by director Ed Coleman. Kate Soloman for iNews rated the performance four out of five stars and called the livestreamed performance "a masterful livestream, full of beautiful noise".

On 30 April, coinciding with the release of the album, Birdy held an album launch party on YouTube by performing a 7-song setlist decided by fans.

== Release ==
Young Heart was released on CD, cassette, vinyl and digital formats. An exclusive purple-coloured 140g vinyl LP is available from Birdy's website which is made from 100% recycled plastic and the LP inner and outer sleeves are made from 100% recycled paper. Each of these recycled pressings are unique as a result of being made from composite materials, a byproduct of wastage in pressing other vinyl records.

== Critical reception ==
Professional ratings
Aggregate scores
Source	Rating
Metacritic	84/100
Review scores
Source	Rating
AllMusic	4.5/5 stars
The Irish Times	3/5 stars
The Line of Best Fit	7/10
NME	4/5 stars
The Times	4/5 stars

Upon its release, Young Heart received critical acclaim from music critics. At Metacritic, which assigns a normalized rating out of 100 to reviews from mainstream critics, the album has an average score of 84, based on 4 critical reviews, indicating "universal acclaim".

The Times praised the album, awarding it four stars, for its "sentiments so uncynical and wide-eyed that it is impossible not to be charmed". A four-star review from NME praised the album as a "gorgeous album that perfectly captures the meandering journey that heartbreak takes you on" and praised the more stripped back style of songs for allowing Birdy's emotions to come to the fore. However, the review criticised the momentum of the 16-song tracklist with "River Song" and "Little Blue". Likewise, Lauren Murphy for The Irish Times writes that at times "Young Heart is too long-winded for its own good". In contrast, a 7/10 review for The Line of Best Fit called it a "coherent addition to an already charming catalogue from Birdy" that is "consistent from start to finish".

== Track listing ==
Young Heart track listing
No.	Title	Writer(s)	Producer(s)	Length
1.	"The Witching Hour – Intro"	Jasmine Van den Bogaerde; Daniel Tashian	Fitchuk; Tashian	0:49
2.	"Voyager"	Van den Bogaerde; Ian Fitchuk; Tashian	Fitchuk; Tashian	4:26
3.	"Loneliness"	Van den Bogaerde; Jamie Scott	James Ford	3:22
4.	"The Otherside"	Van den Bogaerde; Fitchuk; Tashian	Fitchuk; Tashian	3:26
5.	"Surrender"	Van den Bogaerde; Fitchuk; Tashian	Ford	3:54
6.	"Nobody Knows Me Like You Do"	Van den Bogaerde	Birdy	4:57
7.	"River Song"	Van den Bogaerde; Fitchuk; Tashian	Fitchuk; Tashian	3:45
8.	"Second Hand News"	Van den Bogaerde; Jonathan Wright	Ford	4:08
9.	"Deepest Lonely"	Van den Bogaerde; Neil Ormandy	Ford	3:52
10.	"Lighthouse"	Van den Bogaerde; Rachel Furner	Fitchuk; Tashian	3:33
11.	"Chopin Waltz in A Minor (Interlude)"	Frédéric Chopin	Fitchuk; Tashian	0:45
12.	"Evergreen"	Van den Bogaerde; Benjamin Jaffe; Wendy Wang	Fitchuk; Tashian	3:32
13.	"Little Blue"	Van den Bogaerde; Bastian Langebaek	Fitchuk; Tashian	3:03
14.	"Celestial Dancers"	Van den Bogaerde; Foy Vance; James Ford	Fitchuk; Tashian	5:19
15.	"New Moon"	Van den Bogaerde; Fitchuk; Tashian	Fitchuk; Tashian	3:32
16.	"Young Heart"	Van den Bogaerde; Ethan Johns	Fitchuk; Tashian	5:58
Total length:				58:21

Amazon deluxe edition bonus tracks
No.	Title	Writer(s)	Length
17.	"Surrender" (acoustic)	Van den Bogaerde; Fitchuk; Tashian	4:12
18.	"Deepest Lonely" (acoustic)	Van den Bogaerde; Ormandy	3:51
19.	"Open Your Heart"	Van den Bogaerde	3:45
20.	"Island Lights"	Van den Bogaerde	4:31
Total length:			1:14:40

== Personnel ==
Musicians

- Jasmine Van den Bogaerde – vocals, guitar, piano, mellotron, synthesizer, organ
- Ian Fitchuk – bass guitar, drums, mellotron
- Daniel Tashian – synthesizer, background vocals, bass, mellotron
- James Ford – synthesizer, 12-string guitar, drums, harmonium, hammond organ
- Matt Combs – strings
- Tyler Summers – bass clarinet, flute
- Austin Hoke – cello

Production

- Jasmine Van den Bogaerde – vocal recording engineer
- Ian Fitchuk – recording engineer, production (tracks 1, 2, 4, 6, 7, 10–16)
- Daniel Tashian – recording engineer, production (tracks 1, 2, 4, 6, 7, 10–16)
- James Ford – production (tracks 3, 5, 8, 9)
- Sara Law – executive production
- Rachel Moore – assistant engineer
- Cenzo Townshend – mixing engineer
- Mark Stent – mixing engineer
- Camden Clarke – assistant mixing engineer
- Matt Wolach – assistant mixing engineer
- Robert Sellens – assistant mixing engineer
- Jonny Wright – additional production
- Josh Moore – music editor
- Stuart Hawkes – mastering engineer

== Charts ==
Chart performance for Young Heart
Chart (2021)	Peak position
Austrian Albums (Ö3 Austria)	25
Belgian Albums (Ultratop Flanders)	19
Belgian Albums (Ultratop Wallonia)	22
Dutch Albums (Album Top 100)	18
French Albums (SNEP)	90
German Albums (Offizielle Top 100)	23
Hungarian Albums (MAHASZ)	13
Irish Albums (IRMA)	58
Scottish Albums (Official Charts)	9
Swiss Albums (Schweizer Hitparade)	11
UK Albums (Official Charts)	4

== Release history ==
Release history for Young Heart
Region	Date	Format	Label	Ref.
Various	30 April 2021	CD; LP; cassette; digital download; streaming	Atlantic	

== Young Heart Tour ==
Young Heart
- Tour by Birdy
- Start date: 26 March 2023
- End date: 25 April 2023
- No. of shows: 19

=== Tour dates ===
Date	City	Country	Venue
2023
28 March	Berlin	Germany	Tempodrom
30 March	Wiesbaden	Germany	Schlachthof
31 March	Luxembourg	Luxembourg	Den Atelier
1 April	Stuttgart	Germany	Wagenhallen
3 April	Munich	Germany	Neue Theaterfabrik
4 April	Vienna	Austria	Vienna Gasometers
5 April	Zürich	Switzerland	Volkshaus
6 April	Lausanne	Switzerland	Les Docks
8 April	Hamburg	Germany	Fabrik
9 April	Cologne	Germany	Carlswerk Victoria
10 April	Brussels	Belgium	Cirque Royal
11 April	Amsterdam	Netherlands	Royal Theater Carré
12 April	Rotterdam	Netherlands	Rotterdamse Schouwburg
14 April	Paris	France	Le Trianon
17 April	Madrid	Spain	La Riviera
18 April	Barcelona	Spain	Razzmatazz
20 April	Milan	Italy	Fabrique
23 April	London	England	Eventim Apollo
25 April	Dublin	Ireland	Olympia Theatre
