= Light Me Up (Birdy song) =

Single by Birdy

from the album Fire Within
- Released: 23 February 2014
- Recorded: 2012–2013
- Genre: Indie folk; pop rock
- Length: 4:15
- Label: Warner Music Group
- Songwriter(s): Jasmine van den Bogaerde; Trey Starxx; Tom Hull
- Producer(s): Rich Costey

Birdy singles chronology
"No Angel" (2013)	"Light Me Up" (2014)	"Words as Weapons" (2014)

Music video
- "Light Me Up" on YouTube

"Light Me Up" is a song by English musician Birdy. The song was released as a digital download on 23 February 2014 in the United Kingdom, as the third single from her second studio album, Fire Within (2013). The song was written by Birdy, Trey Starxx, Tom Hull and produced by Rich Costey.

== Track listing ==
Digital download
No.	Title	Length
1.	"Light Me Up"	4:15

== Charts ==
Chart performance for "Light Me Up"
Chart (2013)	Peak position
Belgium (Ultratip Bubbling Under Flanders)	2
Belgium (Ultratip Bubbling Under Wallonia)	6

== Release history ==
Region	Date	Format	Label
United Kingdom	23 February 2014	Digital download	Warner Music Group
