= Let It All Go (Rhodes and Birdy song) =

Single by Rhodes & Birdy

from the album Wishes
- Released: 11 September 2015
- Recorded: 2014–2015
- Genre: Indie folk
- Length: 4:40
- Label: Warner Music Group
- Songwriter(s): Jasmine Van Den Bogaerde; David Rhodes
- Producer(s): Jasmine Van Den Bogaerde; David Rhodes

Rhodes singles chronology
"Close your Eyes" (2015)	"Let It All Go" (2015)	"Your Soul (Holding On)" (2016)

Birdy singles chronology
"Words as Weapons" (2014)	"Let It All Go" (2015)	"Keeping Your Head Up" (2016)

Music video
- "Let It All Go" (Official Music video) on YouTube

"Let It All Go" is a song by British musician, singer and songwriter Rhodes and English musician Birdy. It was released as a digital download on 11 September 2015 in the United Kingdom, as the second single from Rhodes' debut studio album, Wishes (2015). The song was written and produced by Rhodes and Birdy.

== Music video ==
The music video for the song was published on the official Birdy YouTube channel on 11 August 2015. It was filmed in Edinburgh, and features Birdy and Rhodes singing in a purple valley. It has currently amounted over 132 million views.

== Track listing ==
Digital download
No.	Title	Length
1.	"Let It All Go" (Radio Edit)	4:40

== Weekly charts ==
Chart (2015)	Peak position
Belgium (Ultratop 50 Flanders)	33
Belgium (Ultratip Bubbling Under Wallonia)	3
Switzerland (Schweizer Hitparade)	14
UK Singles (OCC)	58

== Certifications ==
Region	Certification	Certified units/sales
Denmark (IFPI Danmark)	Gold	45,000^{‡}
New Zealand (RMNZ)	Gold	15,000^{‡}
Poland (ZPAV)	Gold	25,000^{‡}
Switzerland (IFPI Switzerland)	Gold	15,000^{‡}
United Kingdom (BPI)	Silver	200,000^{‡}
^{‡} Sales+streaming figures based on certification alone.

== Release history ==
Region	Date	Format	Label
United Kingdom	11 September 2015	Digital download	Warner Music Group
