= Not About Angels =

Song by Birdy

from the album The Fault in Our Stars (Music from the Motion Picture)
- Length: 3:09
- Label: Atlantic
- Songwriter: Jasmine Van den Bogaerde
- Producer: Jasmine Van den Bogaerde

"Not About Angels" is a song by English singer Birdy. It is one of the theme songs for the film adaptation of the book The Fault in Our Stars.

== Music video ==
The music video for the song premiered on YouTube on 12 June 2014.

== Charts ==
=== Weekly charts ===
Chart (2014)	Peak position
Australia (ARIA)	63
Ireland (IRMA)	100
US Bubbling Under Hot 100 (Billboard)	10
US Heatseekers Songs (Billboard)	21
US Hot Rock & Alternative Songs (Billboard)	17

=== Year-end charts ===
Chart (2014)	Position
US Hot Rock Songs (Billboard)	86

== Certifications ==
Region	Certification	Certified units/sales
Australia (ARIA)	2× Platinum	140,000^{‡}
Denmark (IFPI Danmark)	Platinum	90,000^{‡}
New Zealand (RMNZ)	Platinum	30,000^{‡}
United Kingdom (BPI)	Platinum	600,000^{‡}
United States (RIAA)	Platinum	1,000,000^{‡}
^{‡} Sales+streaming figures based on certification alone.

== In popular culture ==
This song was used by South Korean figure skater Jia Shin for her free skate in the 2023–24 figure skating season, where she won both of her Junior Grand Prix events, as well as the silver medal in the Final. In order to fulfill the required program length, Shin used the music "Portion of Eternity" by Hugo Chouinard for the middle section of her program. The song was also used by United States of America's Elyce Lin-Gracey for her free skate in the same season, earning a silver at her Junior Grand Prix assignment in Yerevan, Armenia.
