= Wishes (Rhodes album) =

Studio album by Rhodes
- Released: 18 September 2015
- Length: 72:20

Wishes is the debut studio album by British musician Rhodes, released on 18 September 2015 through Imports Records.

== Critical reception ==
Professional ratings
Review scores
Source	Rating
The Irish Times	2/5 stars
Renowned for Sound	4/5 stars
laut.de	4/5 stars

Susie Garrard of Renowned for Sound gave the album a favorite review saying "Though there was a great deal of charm to the untried, untested talent that hinted at a great deal more to come, Rhodes more than delivers on that promise with Wishes... you get the feeling that even now, Rhodes is still just beginning to touch the edges of his talent."

Manuel Berger from the German music review website laut.de praised the album and compared Rhodes' musical style to that of Hozier and Lana Del Rey among others. The critic wrote that the album has the potential to suit the taste of a wide variety of listeners.

== Track listing ==
Standard edition
No.	Title	Length
1.	"Intro"	2:38
2.	"Close your Eyes"	3:34
3.	"Raise Your Love"	3:33
4.	"You & I"	4:55
5.	"Breathe"	4:22
6.	"Somebody"	4:18
7.	"Turning Back Around"	3:44
8.	"Your Soul"	3:50
9.	"Losing It"	2:33
10.	"Let It All Go (with Birdy)"	4:40
11.	"Better"	5:26
12.	"Wishes"	4:17
Total length:		1:12:20

Deluxe edition
No.	Title	Length
13.	"Glow"	4:14
14.	"Worry"	4:05
15.	"Run"	3:49
16.	"Blank Space"	4:07
17.	"Morning"	3:38
18.	"Love Live on"	4:48
Total length:		1:37:01

== Charts ==
Chart (2015)	Peak Position
Belgian Albums (Ultratop Flanders)	78
Belgian Albums (Ultratop Wallonia)	152
German Albums (Offizielle Top 100)	82
Scottish Albums (OCC)	28
Swiss Albums (Schweizer Hitparade)	73
UK Albums (OCC)	24
