= Birdy (Birdy album) =

- Standard cover

Studio album by Birdy
- Released: 4 November 2011
- Length: 44:02
- Labels: 14th Floor; Atlantic
- Producers: Jim Abbiss; Rich Costey; James Ford; Alex H. N. Gilbert; Paul 'P-Dub' Walton

Birdy chronology
Birdy (2011)	Fire Within (2013)

Alternative cover
- Deluxe edition cover

Singles from Birdy
- 1. "Skinny Love" Released: 30 January 2011; 2. "Shelter" Released: 3 June 2011; 3. "People Help the People" Released: 28 October 2011; 4. "1901" Released: 9 March 2012

Birdy is the debut studio album by English musician Birdy, released on 4 November 2011 by 14th Floor Records and Atlantic Records. The album includes the singles "Skinny Love", "Shelter", "People Help the People" and "1901". It reached the top ten of the music charts in six countries.

== Singles ==
"Skinny Love" was released on 30 January 2011 as the first single from the album, which was a cover of a song by American indie folk band Bon Iver. The cover reached a peak of number 17 on the UK Singles Chart. "Shelter" was released as the second single from the album on 3 June 2011. The song covers a track by English indie pop group The xx and peaked at number 50 in the UK.

"People Help the People" was released as the album's third single on 28 October 2011. The song is a cover of the song by English indie rock band Cherry Ghost and peaked at number 33 in the UK. "1901" was released in the UK on 9 March 2012 as the album's fourth and final single. It is a cover of the song by French indie rock band Phoenix.

== Critical reception ==
Professional ratings
Aggregate scores
Source	Rating
AnyDecentMusic?	5.9/10
Metacritic	61/100
Review scores
Source	Rating
AllMusic	3.5/5 stars
The Daily Telegraph	3/5 stars
The Guardian	3/5 stars
MusicOMH	3/5 stars
NME	5/10
The Observer	3/5 stars
PopMatters	5/10
Rolling Stone	2/5 stars
Uncut	4/5 stars

Birdy received lukewarm reception from critics. At Metacritic, the album received a score of 61 out of 100, based on 10 critics. AllMusic's Jon O'Brien wrote that "this stripped-back collection of lesser-known hits and album tracks reads like a who's who of lo-fi hipster indie rock", praising Birdy's "youthful and fragile" voice and concluding that "thanks to her haunting tones and a tasteful yet compelling production, it impressively avoids being the try-hard affair you'd expect." The BBC's Nick Levine called the album a "clever covers set... which points to a great future" for the singer. "With a voice that defies her tender years, Birdy... has found herself very quickly touted as one of the brightest up-and-coming talents in the UK," Andy Baber of MusicOMH wrote. Hermione Hoby of The Observer praised her covers of "Skinny Love" and "Shelter", while noting that the self-written track "Without a Word" "suggests she might become even more than just a startling voice."

While praising "Birdy's simple piano/guitar arrangements and her own sweet voice", The Guardian's Caroline Sullivan found the album to be "pleasant but pointless". James Lachno of The Daily Telegraph wrote that the album "consolidates the buzz with more sparse, affecting covers, and a lone original track that is adequately folkish, but for now Birdy remains a novelty." Chris Conaton of PopMatters wrote that Birdy "proves that she can really sing; but [her] appeal may depend on how much enjoy desperate, aching piano ballads, because there are a lot of them here." Duncan Gillespie of NME dismissed the album as "an album of wet-indie covers". Rolling Stone critic Jody Rosen was more critical, panning the album as "the most boring music ever recorded by a teenager" and concluding, "No one so young should have such flawless taste in Quality Indie Rock, or sound this bummed out."

== Track listing ==
Birdy – Standard edition
No.	Title	Writer(s)	Producer(s)	Length
1.	"1901" (by Phoenix)	Thomas Pablo Croquet; Christian Mazzalai; Laurent Mazzalai; Frederic Jean Joseph Moulin	Rich Costey	5:11
2.	"Skinny Love" (by Bon Iver)	Justin Vernon	Alex H. N. Gilbert	3:23
3.	"People Help the People" (by Cherry Ghost)	Simon John Aldred	James Ford	4:16
4.	"White Winter Hymnal" (by Fleet Foxes)	Robin Noel Pecknold	Ford	2:17
5.	"The District Sleeps Alone Tonight" (by the Postal Service)	Jimmy Tamborello; Ben Gibbard	Jim Abbiss	4:44
6.	"I'll Never Forget You" (by Francis and the Lights)	Francis Farewell Starlite	Abbiss	3:47
7.	"Young Blood" (by the Naked and Famous)	Alisa Xayalith; Thomas Brading Powers; Aaron Phillip Short	Costey	4:04
8.	"Shelter" (by The xx)	Oliver David Sim; Romy Anna Madley Croft; James Thomas Smith	Abbiss; Paul 'P-Dub' Walton^{[a]}; Gilbert^{[a]}	3:44
9.	"Fire and Rain" (by James Taylor)	James V. Taylor	Ford	3:07
10.	"Without a Word"	Jasmine van den Bogaerde	Costey	4:46
11.	"Terrible Love" (by the National)	Matthew Donald Berninger; Aaron Brooking Dessner	Costey	4:43
Total length:				44:02

Birdy – Deluxe edition
No.	Title	Writer(s)	Producer(s)	Length
12.	"Comforting Sounds" (by Mew)	Jonas Bjerre; Johan Wohlert; Bo Madsen; Silas Jørgensen	Costey	8:57
13.	"Farewell and Goodnight" (by the Smashing Pumpkins)	James Iha	Abbiss	2:02
14.	"People Help the People" (RAK Studios Session)	Aldred		4:17
Total length:				59:18

Birdy – Australian special edition
No.	Title	Writer(s)	Producer(s)	Length
12.	"Just a Game"	Van den Bogaerde	T Bone Burnett	3:51
13.	"What You Want" (by John Butler Trio)	John Butler	Abbiss	4:12
Total length:				52:05

=== Notes ===
- ^{^[a]} signifies an additional producer.

== Personnel ==
Credits were adapted from the liner notes.

- Birdy – vocals, piano
- Jim Abbiss – drum machine, production
- Leo Abrahams – effects, guitar
- Ben Baptie – mixing assistance
- Jess Barratt – management
- Rupert Bogarde – engineering
- James Brown – engineering
- Ian Burdge – cello
- Greg Calbi – mastering
- Matt Chamberlain – drums, percussion
- Alessandro Cortini – synthesisers
- Rich Costey – engineering, mixing, noise, production, strange noises, synthesisers
- Paul Craig – management
- Neil Cowley – organ, piano
- Dan Curwin – back cover photograph
- Ian Dowling – engineering
- Lauren Dukoff – photography
- Tom Elmhirst – mixing
- James Ford – drums, guitar, percussion, production
- Alex H. N. Gilbert – additional production, executive production, production, studio photography
- Kirk Hellie – guitar
- Gareth Henderson – engineering
- Chris Kasych – assistant engineering
- Alex MacNaghten – bass
- Stephen Webster Mair – double bass
- Jamie Muhoberac – keyboards, piano, synthesisers
- Audrey Riley – string arrangements, string conducting
- Lucy Shaw – cello
- Christian Tattersfield – executive production
- Christopher Tombling – orchestra leader
- Paul 'P-Dub' Walton – additional production, engineering, mixing
- Richard Woodcraft – engineering

== Charts ==
=== Weekly charts ===
Weekly chart performance for Birdy
Chart (2011–2013)	Peak position
Australian Albums (ARIA)	1
Austrian Albums (Ö3 Austria)	14
Belgian Albums (Ultratop Flanders)	1
Belgian Albums (Ultratop Wallonia)	2
Canadian Albums (Nielsen SoundScan)	33
Dutch Albums (Album Top 100)	1
French Albums (SNEP)	5
German Albums (Offizielle Top 100)	14
Irish Albums (IRMA)	40
Italian Albums (FIMI)	55
New Zealand Albums (RMNZ)	4
Polish Albums (ZPAV)	13
Scottish Albums (Official Charts)	18
Swedish Albums (Sverigetopplistan)	52
Swiss Albums (Schweizer Hitparade)	3
UK Albums (Official Charts)	13
US Billboard 200	62
US Top Alternative Albums (Billboard)	12
US Top Rock Albums (Billboard)	15

Weekly chart performance for Birdy
Chart (2026)	Peak position
Hungarian Physical Albums (MAHASZ)	10
Hungarian Vinyl Albums (MAHASZ)	3

=== Year-end charts ===
2011 year-end chart performance for Birdy
Chart (2011)	Position
Belgian Albums (Ultratop Flanders)	74
Dutch Albums (Album Top 100)	42

2012 year-end chart performance for Birdy
Chart (2012)	Position
Australian Albums (ARIA)	10
Belgian Albums (Ultratop Flanders)	3
Belgian Albums (Ultratop Wallonia)	7
Dutch Albums (Album Top 100)	3
French Albums (SNEP)	12
Swiss Albums (Schweizer Hitparade)	70
UK Albums (OCC)	179

2013 year-end chart performance for Birdy
Chart (2013)	Position
Australian Albums (ARIA)	73
French Albums (SNEP)	30
German Albums (Offizielle Top 100)	73
New Zealand Albums (RMNZ)	49
Swiss Albums (Schweizer Hitparade)	14

=== Decade-end charts ===
Decade-end chart performance for Birdy
Chart (2010–2019)	Position
Australian Albums (ARIA)	58

== Certifications ==
Certifications for Birdy
Region	Certification	Certified units/sales
Australia (ARIA)	2× Platinum	140,000^{^}
Austria (IFPI Austria)	Gold	10,000^{*}
Belgium (BRMA)	Platinum	30,000^{*}
Denmark (IFPI Danmark)	Platinum	20,000^{‡}
France (SNEP)	3× Platinum	300,000^{*}
Germany (BVMI)	Platinum	200,000^{‡}
Netherlands (NVPI)	Platinum	50,000^{^}
New Zealand (RMNZ)	Platinum	15,000^{‡}
Poland (ZPAV)	Gold	10,000^{*}
Switzerland (IFPI Switzerland)	Platinum	30,000^{^}
United Kingdom (BPI)	Gold	180,457
Summaries
Europe (IFPI)	Platinum	1,000,000^{*}
^{*} Sales figures based on certification alone.^{^} Shipments figures based on certification alone.^{‡} Sales+streaming figures based on certification alone.

== Release history ==
Release history for Birdy
Region	Date	Label	Ref.
Belgium	4 November 2011	Warner	
Ireland	4 November 2011	14th Floor; Atlantic	
United Kingdom	7 November 2011	14th Floor; Atlantic	
Netherlands	11 November 2011	Warner	
United States	20 March 2012	Warner Bros.	
Germany	23 March 2012	Warner	
Poland	26 March 2012	Warner	
Australia	20 April 2012	Warner	
France	30 April 2012	Warner	
