= Rhodes (singer) =

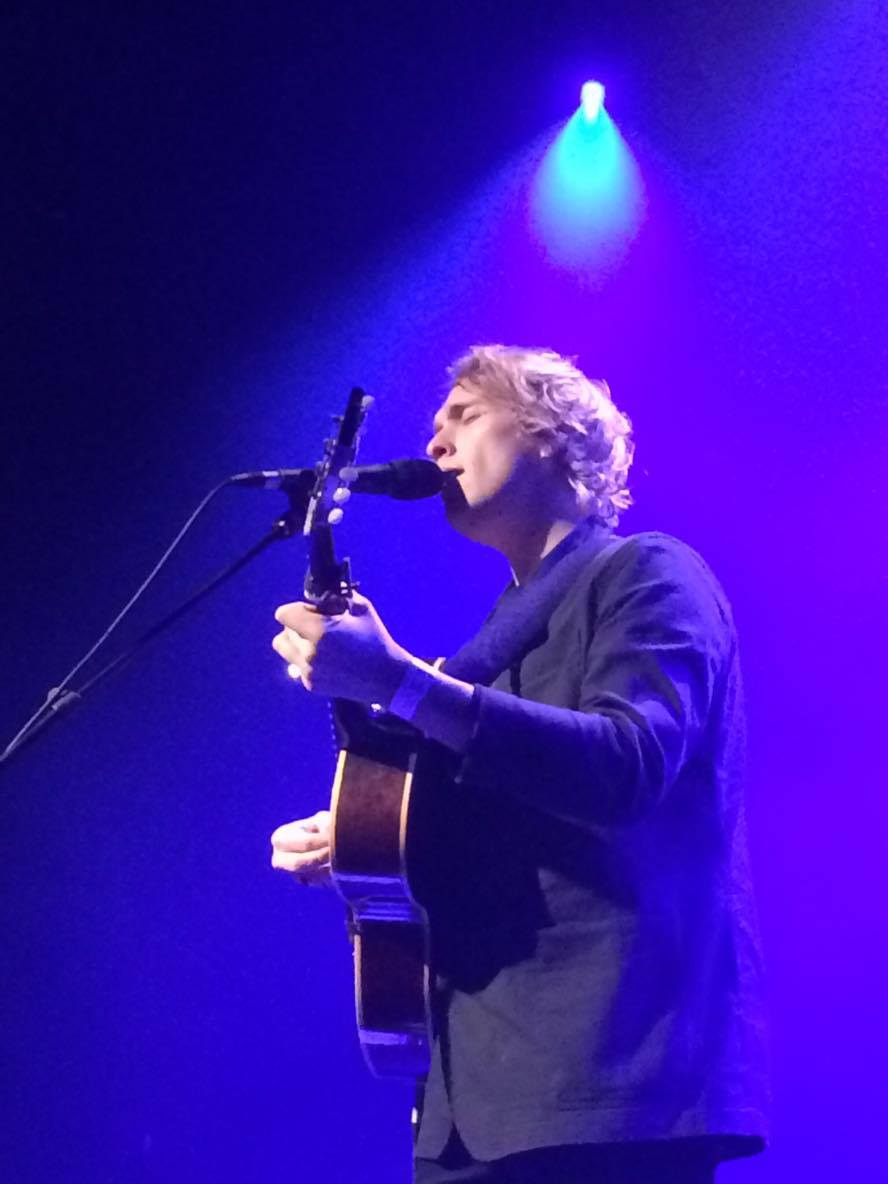
- Rhodes at the Orangerie in Brussels on 6 February 2016

Background information
- Born: David Rhodes; 1988 (age 37–38)
- Origin: Baldock, Hertfordshire, England
- Genres: Indie pop; folk; pop; soul
- Occupations: Singer; songwriter
- Years active: 2013–present
- Labels: Nettwerk Music Group; Sony Music; Rhodes; Hometown
- Website: rhodesofficial.co.uk

David Rhodes, stagename Rhodes (stylised RHODES, born 1988), is an English singer and songwriter from Baldock, Hertfordshire, England. He released his debut EP Raise Your Love on Hometown Records in October 2013 and released his second EP Morning on Rhodes Music on 12 May 2014. His debut album Wishes was released on 18 September 2015.

== Music career ==
=== 2013: Early career and Raise Your Love EP ===
Rhodes's music began to spread early 2013 when his demo track "Always" was playlisted on Amazing Radio and then picked up plays from BBC Radio 1. Following a period supporting Rufus Wainwright, Laura Marling and Nick Mulvey in the UK, his debut EP Raise Your Love was released on Phil Taggart's label Hometown Records in October 2013.

=== 2014: Morning EP and live performances ===
On 12 March 2014, Rhodes released the song "Your Soul" – which was premiered by Zane Lowe on BBC Radio 1 as his 'Next Hype' – taken from his second EP 'Morning' released on 11 May 2014. On this EP, Rhodes recorded alongside Ian Grimble and Tim Bran/Roy Kerr, producers who have been previously working with the likes of London Grammar and Daughter.

In March and April 2014, Rhodes completed his first UK headline tour, including 3 sold-out gigs at London's Sebright Arms on 8, 9 & 10 April 2014. He supported London Grammar on their UK tour (including one of the O2 Academy Brixton Academy shows) as well as Sam Smith in the UK (at the Roundhouse) and in Europe (Amsterdam and Paris). Rhodes also performed at BBC Radio 1 Big Weekend in Glasgow on the BBC Introducing stage on 25 May and at the Glastonbury Festival on 29 June on the Rabbit Hole stage.

=== 2015–present: Wishes ===
On 26 June 2015, he played at the Park Stage at Glastonbury Festival. In July, the first single to be taken from his album Wishes, "Close your Eyes", charted at 85 on the UK Singles Chart. A week before the release of his debut album, Rhodes released a duet with Birdy, "Let It All Go". It charted in many countries and is his most successful single to date. He then released Wishes, which peaked at 24 on the UK Albums Chart.

Rhodes featured on Kygo's debut studio album Cloud Nine, providing the vocals for the track "Not Alone".

On 9 June 2017, he released the single, "Sleep Is a Rose", and the music video for the song, which was recorded live, was released the same day on the Rhodes Vevo channel on YouTube. The song came to him one sleepless night in the Lake District. He was lying awake in a small cottage when he came up with the song. On 23 March he released a collaboration with German DJ Alle Farben of a cover of American country music duo Florida Georgia Line's song "H.O.L.Y.".

In January 2023, Rhodes released his digital format album Friends Like These which he said he wrote from dreams and conversations with friends during the lockdown days of the Coronavirus disease (COVID-19) pandemic.

In late 2023, Rhodes announced the release of his third studio album Un-Finished (Nettwerk Records). It was released on digital format and limited edition vinyl on 1 March 2024.

== Discography ==
=== Albums ===
Title	Details	Peak chart positions				
Title	Details	UK	BEL	GER	SCO	SWI
Wishes	Released: 18 September 2015; Label: Rhodes Music/Ministry Of Sound; Format: digital download, CD	24	78	82	28	73
Friends Like These	Released: 27 January 2023; Label: Rhodes/Nettwerk Music Group Inc.; Format: digital download only.	—	—	—	—	—
(Un-Finished)	Released: 1 March 2024; Label: Rhodes/Nettwerk Music Group Inc.; Format: digital download only.	—	—	—	—	—

=== Extended plays ===
Title	Details
Raise Your Love	Released: 28 October 2013; Re-released: 21 March 2014; Label: Hometown Records, Rhodes Music; Format: Digital download, LP
Morning	Released: 11 May 2014; Label: Rhodes Music; Format: Digital download, LP
Home	Released: 19 October 2014; Label: Rhodes Music; Format: Digital download, LP
Turning Back Around	Released: 12 April 2015; Label: Rhodes Music; Format: Digital download, LP
I'm Not OK	Released: 10 July 2020; Label: B1 Recordings; Format: Digital download, LP

=== Singles ===
Year	Title	Peak chart positions					Album
Year	Title	UK	BEL (Fl)	BEL (Wa)	SCO	SWI	Album
2014	"Raise Your Love" (Live From Burberry Fashion Show)	—	—	—	—	—	Non-album single
2015	"Close Your Eyes"	85	—	—	77	—	Wishes
2015	"Let It All Go" (with Birdy)	58	33	53	23	14	Wishes
2016	"Your Soul (Holding On)" (with Felix Jaehn)	—	—	—	—	93	Non-album singles
2017	"Sleep Is a Rose"	—	—	—	—	—	Non-album singles
2018	"H.O.L.Y." (with Alle Farben)	—	—	—	—	—	Non-album singles
2020	"This Shouldn't Work"	—	—	—	—	—	I'm Not OK
2020	"Love You Sober"	—	—	—	—	—	I'm Not OK
2020	"I'm Not Ok"	—	—	—	—	—	I'm Not OK
2022	"No Words"	—	—	—	—	—	Friends Like These
2022	"Suffering"	—	—	—	—	—	Friends Like These
2022	"The Love I Give"	—	—	—	—	—	Friends Like These
2022	"Friends Like These"	—	—	—	—	—	Friends Like These
2023	"Good to You"	—	—	—	—	—	Friends Like These
2023	"Happy"	—	—	—	—	—	(Un-Finished)
2023	"Sunlight"	—	—	—	—	—	(Un-Finished)
2023	"How I Love You"	—	—	—	—	—	(Un-Finished)
2023	"Toothpaste"	—	—	—	—	—	(Un-Finished)
2023	"All I've Ever Known"	—	—	—	—	—	(Un-Finished)
"—" denotes a single that did not chart or was not released.
