= Wings (Birdy song) =

2013 single by Birdy

Single by Birdy

from the album Fire Within
- Released: 29 July 2013
- Length: 4:12 (album version); 3:49 (radio edit); 3:42 (acoustic version); 4:25 (music video)
- Label: Warner Music Group; Atlantic; 14th Floor
- Songwriters: Jasmine van den Bogaerde; Ryan Tedder
- Producers: Ryan Tedder; Rich Costey

Birdy singles chronology
"1901" (2012)	"Wings" (2013)	"No Angel" (2013)

Music video
- "Wings" (Official Music video) on YouTube

"Wings" is a song by English musician Birdy. The song was released as a digital download on 29 July 2013 and in the United Kingdom on 8 September 2013 as the lead single from her second studio album, Fire Within (2013). The song peaked at number eight on the UK Singles Chart, making it Birdy's highest-charting single and her only top-10 single. It also reached number one in Ireland, becoming her sole top-10 hit there as well, and peaked within the top three in five other countries. A remix by Nu:Logic was later released on 27 January 2014 as part of the "Hospital: We Are 18" LP from Hospital Records.

== Music video ==
A music video to accompany the release of "Wings" was first released onto YouTube on 2 August 2013 at a total length of four minutes and twenty-five seconds. The video shows Birdy with guests at a flamboyant mansion party, complete with masks, fencing and horses. It was directed by Sophie Muller.

== Track listings ==
Digital download
No.	Title	Length
1.	"Wings"	4:12

German, Swiss, and Austrian CD single
No.	Title	Length
1.	"Wings"	4:12
2.	"People Help the People" (live from Sydney Opera House, April 2013)	4:27

== Charts ==
=== Weekly charts ===
Chart (2013–2015)	Peak position
Australia (ARIA)	25
Austria (Ö3 Austria Top 40)	3
Belgium (Ultratop 50 Flanders)	5
Belgium (Ultratop 50 Wallonia)	3
Czech Republic Airplay (ČNS IFPI)	17
France (SNEP)	8
Germany (GfK)	15
Ireland (IRMA)	1
Netherlands (Dutch Top 40)	25
Netherlands (Single Top 100)	27
New Zealand (Recorded Music NZ)	17
Slovakia Airplay (ČNS IFPI)	42
Slovenia (SloTop50)	3
Scottish Singles Sales (Official Charts)	16
Spain (Promusicae)	3
Switzerland (Schweizer Hitparade)	3
UK Singles (Official Charts)	8

=== Year-end charts ===
Chart (2013)	Position
Austria (Ö3 Austria Top 40)	62
Belgium (Ultratop 50 Flanders)	44
Belgium (Ultratop 50 Wallonia)	42
France (SNEP)	84
Germany (Media Control GfK)	73
Netherlands (Dutch Top 40)	120
Switzerland (Schweizer Hitparade)	61

Chart (2014)	Position
Spain (PROMUSICAE)	14

Chart (2015)	Position
UK Singles (OCC)	94

== Certifications ==
Region	Certification	Certified units/sales
Australia (ARIA)	2× Platinum	140,000^{‡}
Austria (IFPI Austria)	Platinum	30,000^{*}
Belgium (BRMA)	Gold	15,000^{*}
Denmark (IFPI Danmark)	Gold	45,000^{‡}
Germany (BVMI)	3× Gold	450,000^{‡}
New Zealand (RMNZ)	2× Platinum	60,000^{‡}
Spain (Promusicae)	Platinum	60,000^{‡}
Switzerland (IFPI Switzerland)	Platinum	30,000^{^}
United Kingdom (BPI)	3× Platinum	1,800,000^{‡}
Streaming
Spain (Promusicae)	Gold	4,000,000^{†}
^{*} Sales figures based on certification alone.^{^} Shipments figures based on certification alone.^{‡} Sales+streaming figures based on certification alone.^{†} Streaming-only figures based on certification alone.

== In popular culture ==
The song was featured in trailers for Winter's Tale, Labor Day, the season five finale of The Vampire Diaries and one episode of Catfish: The TV Show. In 2015, it was also used as the soundtrack of the Lloyds Horse Story 250 year anniversary advert, resulting in its return to the UK Singles Chart, reaching a new peak of number 8. Birdy performed the song at the 2016 BBC Festival of Remembrance. The song was covered by British rock band Nothing But Thieves for the BBC Radio 1 Live Lounge series.
