= Skinny Love =

2008 single by Bon Iver

Single by Bon Iver

from the album For Emma, Forever Ago
- Released: April 28, 2008
- Genre: Indie folk
- Length: 3:58
- Label: 4AD; Jagjaguwar
- Songwriter: Justin Vernon

Bon Iver singles chronology
| "Skinny Love" (2008) | "For Emma" (2008) |

"Skinny Love" is a song written by American musician Justin Vernon. It was originally released by Vernon's band Bon Iver in 2007. A cover version by the British vocalist Birdy was released in 2011. Both versions charted internationally and have been featured in multiple television and film soundtracks. The song has since become a popular tune for various singing competition shows around the English-speaking world.

== Background ==
"Skinny Love" was the first single released from Bon Iver's 2007 debut album, For Emma, Forever Ago, in the United States. The song was released as a single in the United Kingdom on April 28, 2008. While "Skinny Love" has been considered a reference to singer Justin Vernon's relationship with former girlfriend Christy Smith, Vernon countered this as "not entirely accurate [...] it's about that time in a relationship that I was going through; you're in a relationship because you need help, but that's not necessarily why you should be in a relationship. And that's skinny."

The song was used in the second episode of Grey's Anatomy's fifth season. The digital download track "Skinny Love" was selected to be iTunes (UK) single of the week and was available for free during that time, as well as being featured as the track of the day on National Public Radio. On October 6, 2008, "Skinny Love" was featured in the NBC series Chuck (season 2, episode 3). On December 11, 2008, Bon Iver performed "Skinny Love" on the Late Show with David Letterman. On January 26, 2009, "Skinny Love" was announced at #21 by the Australian national radio station Triple J in the annual Hottest 100 countdown of the previous year's best songs. In July 2009, "Skinny Love" was announced at #92 in Triple J's Hottest 100 of All Time countdown. In June 2013, "Skinny Love" was announced at #16 in Triple J's Hottest 100 of the Last 20 Years countdown.

== Track listing ==
| No. | Title | Length |
|---|---|---|
| 1. | "Skinny Love" | 3:59 |

== Charts ==
Weekly chart performance for "Skinny Love" by Bon Iver
| Chart (2012) | Peak position |
|---|---|
| Denmark (Tracklisten) | 32 |
| Portugal (AFP) | 18 |
| UK Official Streaming Chart Top 100 | 88 |

| Chart (2016) | Peak position |
|---|---|
| Australia (ARIA Hitseekers) | 20 |

== Certifications ==
| Region | Certification | Certified units/sales |
|---|---|---|
| Denmark (IFPI Danmark) | Platinum | 90,000^{‡} |
| Italy (FIMI) | Gold | 25,000^{‡} |
| New Zealand (RMNZ) | 2× Platinum | 60,000^{‡} |
| Spain (Promusicae) | Gold | 30,000^{‡} |
| United Kingdom (BPI) | Platinum | 600,000^{‡} |
| United States (RIAA) | 2× Platinum | 2,000,000^{‡} |
^{‡} Sales+streaming figures based on certification alone.

== Birdy version ==
"Skinny Love"
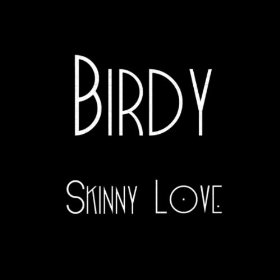

Single by Birdy

from the album Birdy
- Released: January 30, 2011
- Length: 3:22
- Label: 14th Floor; Atlantic
- Songwriter: Justin Vernon
- Producer: Alex H. N. Gilbert

Birdy singles chronology
| "Skinny Love" (2011) | "Shelter" (2011) |

British musician Birdy released a cover version of the song in 2011 as her debut single. The single has been B-listed on Xfm and is a particular favourite with listeners of Shak's overnight show. The song was also chosen as "Record of the Week" by UK radio DJ Fearne Cotton. This version was used in Season 2 Episode 21 of The Vampire Diaries and in Season 1 Episode 1 of Prisoners' Wives.

The song also skyrocketed in Australian popularity within the ARIA Charts' top ten, partly because of Bella Ferraro, an X Factor 2012 Top Four contestant who performed the song at the X Factor auditions aired in Australia in August 2012. The song reached number two on the ARIA Singles Chart in September, kept off the number-one spot by Guy Sebastian's song "Battle Scars" for three weeks. A similar event took place in New Zealand in May 2013 after X Factor winner Jackie Thomas performed the song at her audition. The song entered the top 40 for the first time and reached number two on the RIANZ chart following the broadcast, behind Robin Thicke's "Blurred Lines".

In 2011, "Skinny Love" sold 259,000 copies in the UK, becoming the third biggest selling rock single of that year. As of August 2016, the song had sold 744,502 copies in the UK.

=== Music videos ===
There are three music videos for this single. The first music video for the song was uploaded to YouTube on April 1, 2011. It features Birdy playing the piano of walking in a dark house. The second music video was shot in one take and framed on Birdy's face. The camera changes focus as she sings. It was uploaded on October 14, 2011. The third music video was uploaded on January 15, 2014.

=== Track listing ===
| No. | Title | Length |
|---|---|---|
| 1. | "Skinny Love" | 3:22 |

=== Charts ===
==== Weekly charts ====
| Chart (2011–2014) | Peak position |
|---|---|
| Australia (ARIA) | 2 |
| Austria (Ö3 Austria Top 40) | 15 |
| Belgium (Ultratop 50 Flanders) | 3 |
| Belgium (Ultratop 50 Wallonia) | 4 |
| France (SNEP) | 2 |
| Germany (GfK) | 73 |
| Ireland (IRMA) | 22 |
| Italy (FIMI) | 48 |
| Japan Hot 100 (Billboard) | 29 |
| Netherlands (Dutch Top 40) | 2 |
| Netherlands (Single Top 100) | 1 |
| New Zealand (Recorded Music NZ) | 2 |
| Poland (ZPAV) | 88 |
| Scotland Singles (OCC) | 17 |
| Switzerland (Schweizer Hitparade) | 19 |
| UK Singles (OCC) | 17 |
| US Adult Pop Airplay (Billboard) | 37 |
| US Hot Rock & Alternative Songs (Billboard) | 24 |

==== Year-end charts ====
| Chart (2011) | Position |
|---|---|
| Belgium (Ultratop 50 Flanders) | 20 |
| Netherlands (Dutch Top 40) | 53 |
| Netherlands (Single Top 100) | 22 |
| UK Singles (OCC) | 81 |

| Chart (2012) | Position |
|---|---|
| Australia (ARIA) | 8 |
| Belgium (Ultratop 50 Flanders) | 26 |
| Belgium (Ultratop 50 Wallonia) | 20 |
| France (SNEP) | 12 |
| Netherlands (Dutch Top 40) | 39 |
| Netherlands (Single Top 100) | 26 |
| Switzerland (Schweizer Hitparade) | 52 |
| UK Singles (OCC) | 127 |

| Chart (2013) | Position |
|---|---|
| Belgium (Ultratop 50 Wallonia) | 95 |
| France (SNEP) | 92 |
| New Zealand (RIANZ) | 24 |

| Chart (2014) | Position |
|---|---|
| US Hot Rock Songs (Billboard) | 48 |

==== Decade-end charts ====
| Chart (2010–2019) | Position |
|---|---|
| Australia (ARIA) | 51 |

=== Certifications ===
| Region | Certification | Certified units/sales |
|---|---|---|
| Australia (ARIA) | 11× Platinum | 770,000^{‡} |
| Austria (IFPI Austria) | 2× Platinum | 60,000^{*} |
| Belgium (BRMA) | Platinum | 30,000^{*} |
| Canada (Music Canada) | Gold | 40,000^{*} |
| Denmark (IFPI Danmark) | 2× Platinum | 180,000^{‡} |
| France (SNEP) | Platinum | 150,000^{*} |
| Germany (BVMI) | 3× Gold | 450,000^{‡} |
| Italy (FIMI) | Platinum | 50,000^{‡} |
| New Zealand (RMNZ) | 4× Platinum | 120,000^{‡} |
| Spain (Promusicae) | Platinum | 60,000^{‡} |
| Sweden (GLF) | Platinum | 40,000^{‡} |
| Switzerland (IFPI Switzerland) | Platinum | 30,000^{^} |
| United Kingdom (BPI) | 3× Platinum | 1,800,000^{‡} |
| United States (RIAA) | Platinum | 1,000,000^{‡} |
Streaming
| Denmark (IFPI Danmark) | Gold | 900,000^{†} |
^{*} Sales figures based on certification alone.^{^} Shipments figures based on certification alone.^{‡} Sales+streaming figures based on certification alone.^{†} Streaming-only figures based on certification alone.

=== Release history ===
| Region | Date | Format | Label | Ref. |
|---|---|---|---|---|
| United Kingdom | January 30, 2011 | Digital download | Atlantic | |
| United States | January 24, 2012 | Digital download | Atlantic | |
| United States | February 11, 2014 | Contemporary hit radio | Atlantic | |
