= Birdy (singer) =

British singer (born 1996)

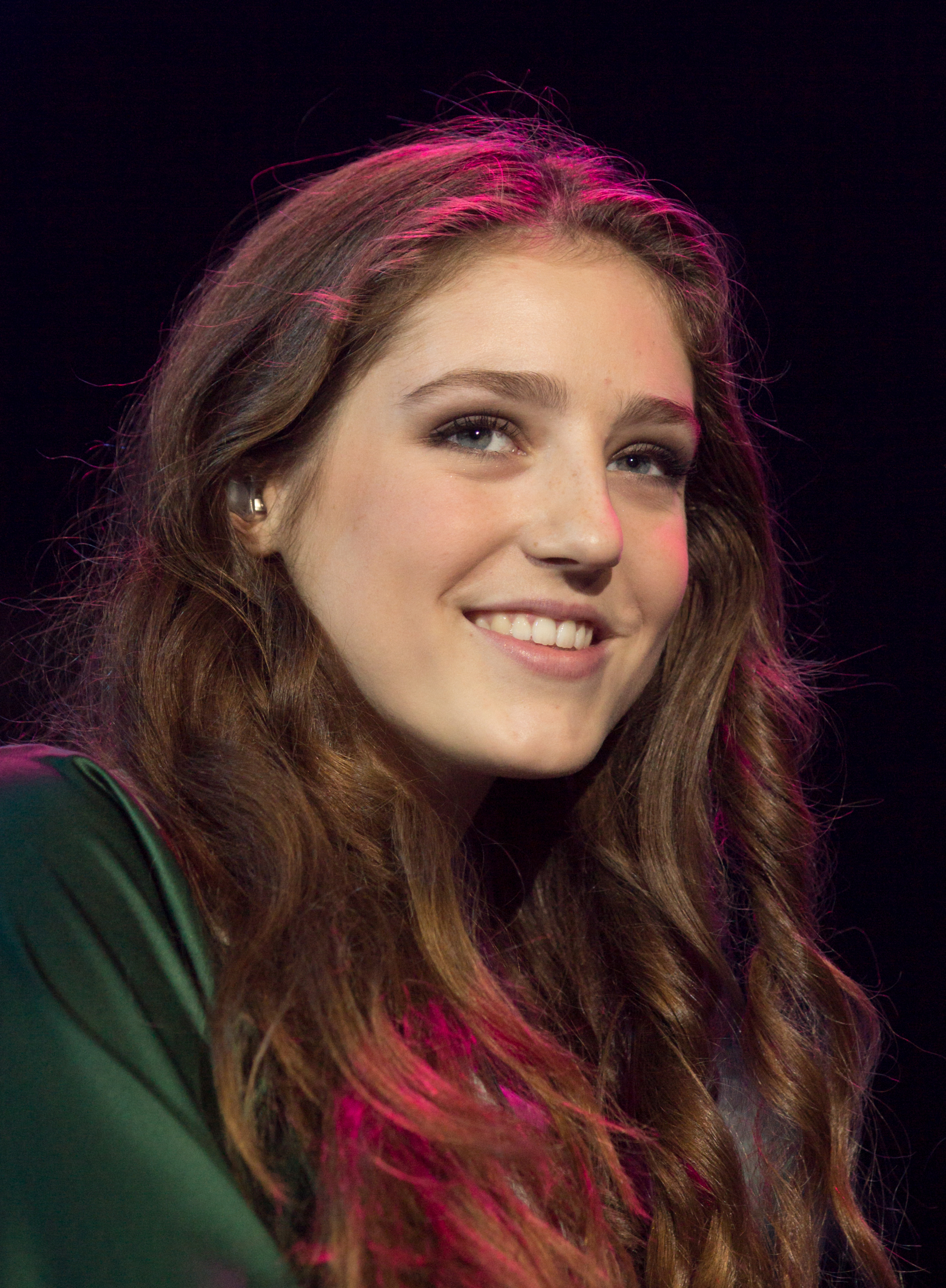
- Birdy in 2013

Background information
- Born: Jasmine Lucilla Elizabeth Jennifer van den Bogaerde; 15 May 1996 (age 30); Lymington, Hampshire, England
- Genres: Indie folk; indie pop; folk-pop
- Occupations: Singer; songwriter
- Instruments: Vocals; piano; guitar
- Works: Discography
- Years active: 2008–present
- Labels: Lady of the Lake; 14th Floor; Warner Bros.; Atlantic; Warner
- Website: www.officialbirdy.com

Jasmine Lucilla Elizabeth Jennifer van den Bogaerde (born 15 May 1996), known professionally as Birdy (/ˈbɜːdi/ BUR-dee), is a British singer. She won the music competition Open Mic UK in 2008, at the age of 12.

Birdy's debut single, a cover version of Bon Iver's "Skinny Love", was her breakthrough. The track charted all across Europe and earned platinum certification six times in Australia. Her debut album, Birdy, was released on 7 November 2011 to similar success, peaking at #1 in Australia, Belgium, and the Netherlands. Birdy's second studio album, Fire Within, was released on 23 September 2013 in the UK. At the 2014 Brit Awards, she was nominated for Best British Female Solo Artist. Birdy's third studio album, Beautiful Lies, was released on 25 March 2016. Her fourth studio album Young Heart was released on 30 April 2021. Birdy's fifth studio album, Portraits, was released on 18 August 2023, which includes the singles "Raincatchers", "Heartbreaker", "Your Arms" and "Paradise Calling".

== Early life ==
Birdy was born on 15 May 1996, in Lymington, England. Her father is Rupert Oliver Benjamin van den Bogaerde, a writer; her mother is Sophie Patricia (née Roper-Curzon). She stated that the classical music and songs her mother played when she was growing up influenced her sound. Her parents were married in 1995 and have two other children: Jake (born 1997) and Caitlin (born 1999). She also has two elder half-brothers, Moses and Sam, from her father's first marriage. Her maternal uncles include Peter Roper-Curzon, a pianist and composer, and William Roper-Curzon, a painter.

Birdy studied at Durlston Court Prep School in Barton on Sea, at Priestlands School, and at Brockenhurst College, a sixth form college in the New Forest. Her maternal grandfather was Captain John Christopher Ingram Roper-Curzon, the 20th Baron Teynham. Birdy grew up at Pylewell Park, the family estate near Lymington, Hampshire. Her great-uncle was the actor Sir Dirk Bogarde. Birdy has English, Belgian (Flemish), Dutch, and Scottish ancestry.

Birdy's second given name, Lucilla, was the name of her father's stepmother.

Birdy's stage name comes from the nickname her parents gave her as a baby because she opened her mouth like a little bird when being fed.

== Career ==
=== 2008–2012: Early career ===
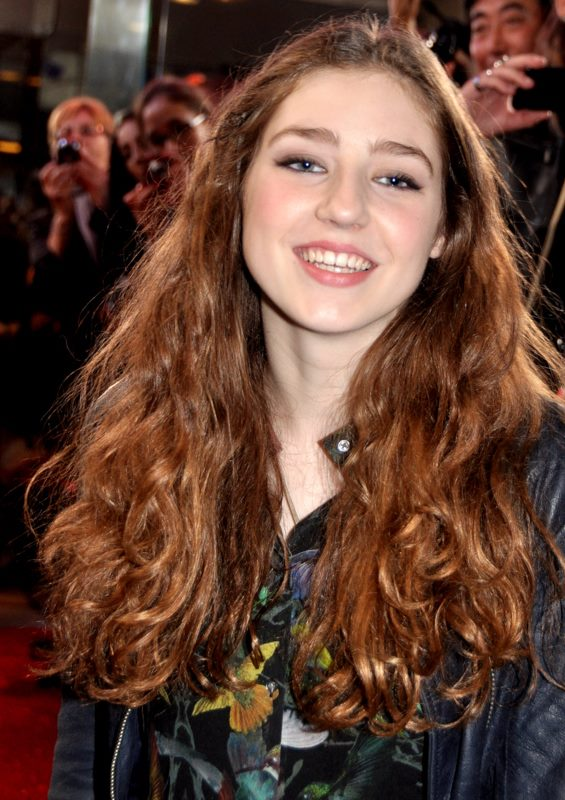
Birdy at the 2012 Champs-Élysées Film Festival

In 2008, while still a 12-year-old pupil at Durlston Court Preparatory School, Birdy won the UK talent contest Open Mic UK, a spinoff of the Live and Unsigned competition. She won both the under-18s category and the Grand Prize against 10,000 other competitors. She performed her own song called "So Be Free" at the competition in front of 2,000 people.

In 2009, Birdy performed live on piano for BBC Radio 3's Pianothon in London. In January 2011, at the age of 14, Birdy released a cover version of Bon Iver's song "Skinny Love". The song became her first hit on the UK Singles Chart, peaking at #17. The single was chosen as "Record of the Week" by radio DJ Fearne Cotton, resulting in it being added to BBC Radio 1's B‑list playlist upon release in March 2011. The official music video for the song was directed by Sophie Muller. The song was also featured in The Vampire Diaries episode "The Sun Also Rises", which aired on 5 May 2011. "Skinny Love" peaked at #1 in the Netherlands.

Birdy went on to cover further songs, including "The A Team" by Ed Sheeran and the xx's "Shelter". On 19 July 2011, she performed both for BBC Radio 1's Live Lounge. The latter featured in The Vampire Diaries episode "The End of the Affair", which aired on 29 September 2011.

Birdy's eponymous debut album of cover versions (plus one original song written by her) was released on 7 November 2011; the album peaked at #13 in the UK, #40 in Ireland and #1 in Belgium, the Netherlands and Australia. In August 2012 her début album peaked at #1 in Australia, while the singles "Skinny Love" and "People Help the People" peaked at #2 and #10 respectively.

In June 2012, Birdy contributed the song "Learn Me Right" with Mumford & Sons to the Pixar film Brave; she received her first Grammy Award nomination for the track.

On 7 August 2012, Birdy released her "Live in London" EP, which contained eight songs. This included her cover of Ed Sheeran's "The A Team" and her song from The Hunger Games soundtrack, "Just a Game". On 29 August 2012, Birdy performed the Anohni and the Johnsons's song "Bird Gerhl" (from the album I Am a Bird Now) during the opening ceremony of the London Paralympic Games. In October 2012, Birdy sang live on the French TV music program Taratata, performing "Call Me Maybe" by Carly Rae Jepsen.

Birdy paid a visit to Australia in August 2012, during which Dolly magazine took her on a visit to Taronga Zoo in Sydney. She also made appearances on shows such as Sunrise and The X Factor singing "Skinny Love" and "People Help the People".

=== 2013–2015: Fire Within and touring ===
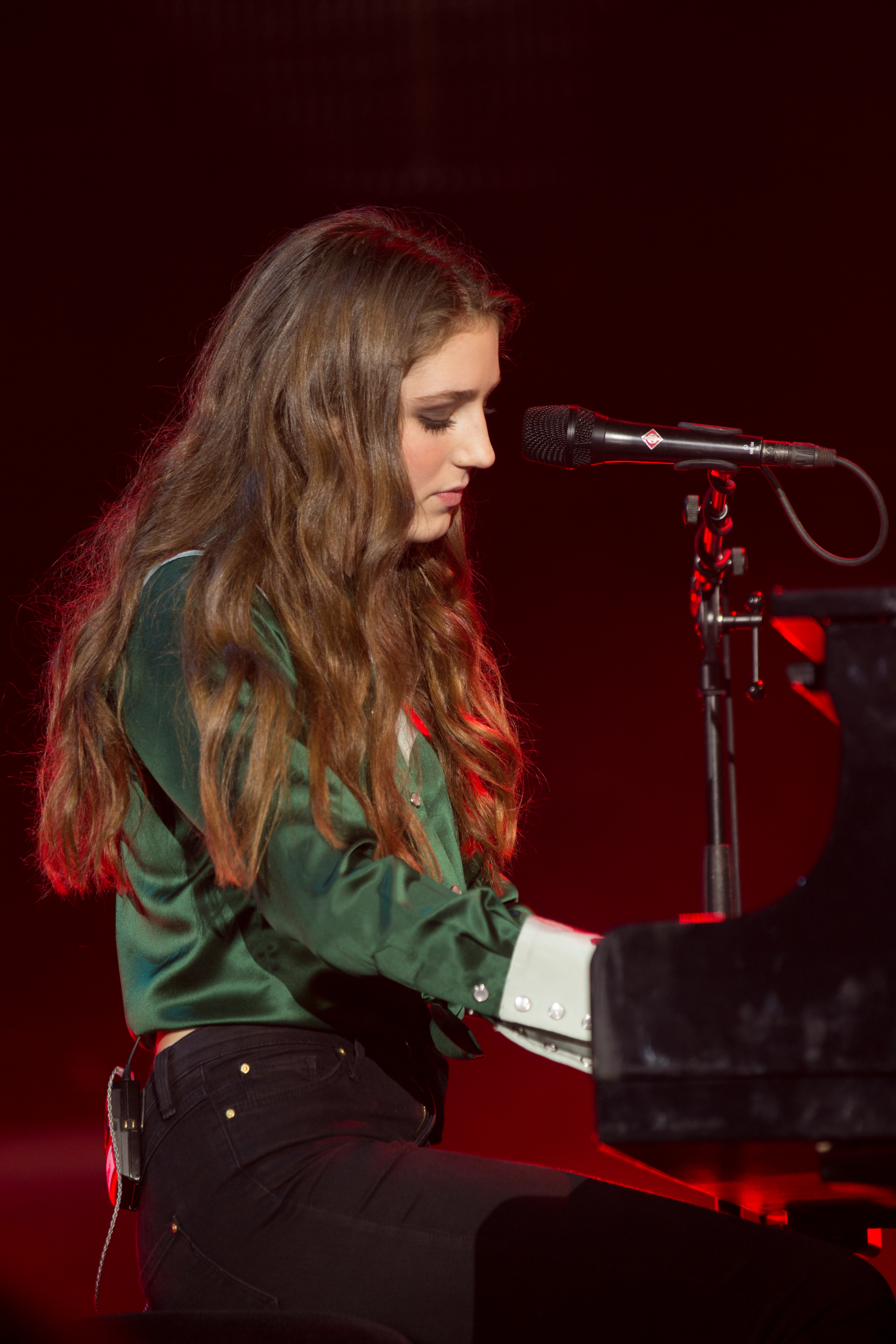
Birdy at the SWR3 New Pop Festival in Baden-Baden 2013

On 16 February 2013, Birdy sang at Sanremo Music Festival 2013. She then announced the release of her second studio album Fire Within via a YouTube video on 10 July 2013. The video included footage of Birdy in the studio along with a preview of two of the album's songs "Wings" and "No Angel". The former was released as a single on 22 July 2013; a second song "All You Never Say" was sent to subscribers of Birdy's mailing list and uploaded to YouTube on 15 August 2013. "Wings" featured in The Vampire Diaries episode "Home", which aired on 15 May 2014 (her eighteenth birthday). Birdy's album was released in the UK and other surrounding countries on 23 September 2013 and received mostly positive reviews. In North America, the album was released on 3 June 2014. A subsequent EP titled Breathe was released on 24 September.

Birdy toured America and Australia in 2013. After her concert in the Palais Theatre in Melbourne, Australia, a reviewer described her as a sensational pianist who appears to be shy and timid, but whose voice "rings throughout the theatre." The only criticism was that what was "severely lacking" was any sense of crowd interaction. The tour also included appearances on TV shows like Sunrise, on which she sang "Wings." While in Melbourne, Birdy also sang "Skinny Love" at the Logie Awards in April 2013.

In September 2013, Birdy covered a song entitled "Let Her Go" by Passenger, live on BBC Radio 1 Live Lounge. This track features on the BBC Radio 1 Live Lounge 2013 album. In December 2013, Birdy performed "Mandela Day" with James Blunt, originally by Simple Minds, at the NRJ Music Awards as a tribute to Nelson Mandela. Also in December 2013, she performed "L'Idole Des Jeunes" with Johnny Hallyday on Le Grand Show.

Birdy won the Best International Rock/Pop Artist award at the Echo Award 2014, held at Messe Berlin on 17 March 2014. She performed "Words As Weapons" during the presentation.

In October 2014, Birdy covered "Lucky Star" by Madonna, appearing on BBC Radio 2's Sounds of the 80s album. In the same year, Birdy was featured on four of the tracks on the Shadows album by Native Roses, in which her elder brother, Moses, is a drummer.

Birdy contributed three songs to the soundtrack for the film The Fault in Our Stars: "Tee Shirt", "Best Shot" (with Jaymes Young), and "Not About Angels". Videos for both were released. Birdy appears on the 2014 David Guetta album Listen, featured on the song "I'll Keep Loving You".

Birdy's song "Wings," from her second album, was used as the soundtrack to the Lloyds Bank 250-year anniversary Horse Story advertisements in June 2015.

In August 2015, Birdy co-wrote "Let It All Go" with Rhodes. The single was released on 11 September 2015 via digital download in the UK. In October 2015, Birdy performed a cover of Firestone, originally by Kygo ft. Conrad Sewell on BBC Radio 1's Live Lounge. This track featured on the BBC Radio 1's Live Lounge 2015 album.

=== 2016–2021: Beautiful Lies and Young Heart ===
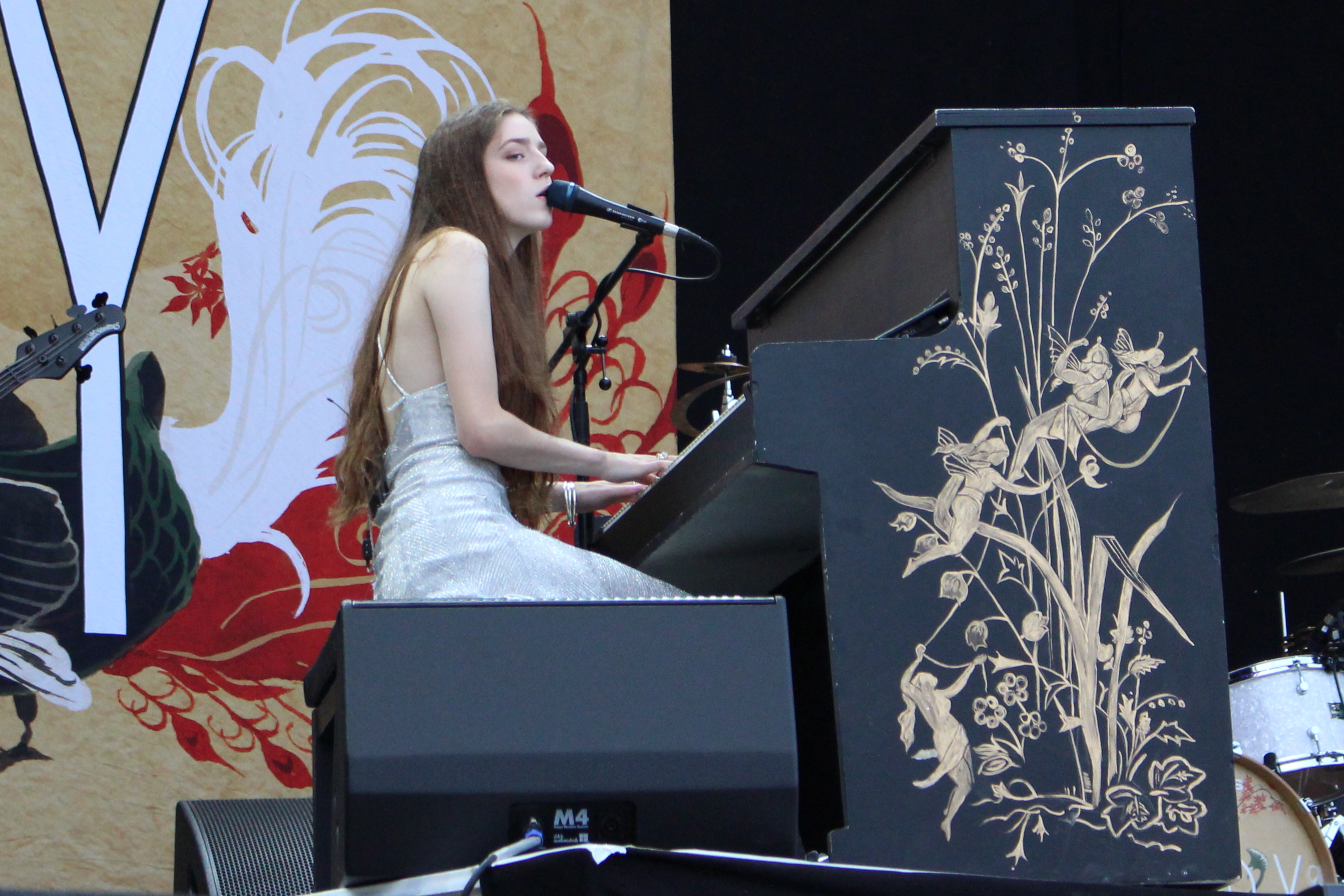
Birdy performing at Frequency Festival 2017

In January 2016, Birdy released "Keeping Your Head Up", the first single from her third album, Beautiful Lies, which she had started writing material for in 2014 while touring in America. "Beautiful Lies", the second single from the album was released in February. "Wild Horses", the third single from the album was released in March. The album itself was released on 25 March 2016. On 20 April 2016, the Japanese Edition of Beautiful Lies was released, containing a bonus track entitled "Lights".

Speaking about Beautiful Lies, Birdy later said this album was what she was most proud of. She added: "The album is about growing up and not accepting change. It's about not really wanting to grow up; it's about lying to yourself. I'd missed a lot of growing up with my family so it's about that. It's also inspired by 'Memories of a Geisha' so it has an Asian feel to it and it's about feeling a much stronger person."

On 1 April 2016, Birdy performed a cover of 'Adventure of a Lifetime' originally by Coldplay for 3FM. On 16 April 2016, Birdy released a limited edition vinyl for Record Store Day of the songs 'Lost It All' and 'Take You Everywhere I Go'. On 25 April 2016, Birdy performed a cover of "Fast Car" by Tracy Chapman for BBC Radio 1 Live Lounge, and on 27 April she performed a cover of "Sorry" by Justin Bieber at SiriusXM Studios.

On 8 May 2016, Birdy performed 'Wild Horses' at the opening ceremony of the British Academy of Film and Television Arts (BAFTA) awards night, at the Royal Festival Hall in London. She was also the face of the REDValentino spring/summer campaign for 2016 and 2017.

On 23 September 2016, "Beautiful Birds" was released by Passenger, featuring Birdy. On 4 November 2016, "Find Me" was released by Sigma, featuring Birdy. The song peaked at #36 on the UK Singles Chart and #1 on the Billboard Dance Club Songs chart in its 20 May 2017 issue.

Birdy toured extensively after the release of Beautiful Lies, including a tour of the United States and an Asian tour from Japan to Singapore. By this time, her band had grown from four to five, with an almost completely new lineup. The band members were: Charlotte Hatherley (guitar), Joel Grainger (violin), Richard Evans (bass), Jay Sikora (drums), and Hazel Mills (keyboards). She has said she found Asia like another planet, "such a different world." The audiences were very reserved and quiet, there would be a huge gap after each song, then they would start clapping; it made her wonder if they liked her. She said they don't really clap that much, then after the show they were going crazy and screaming. She found it "really strange."

In an interview with Interview magazine, on 22 March 2016, Birdy explained how she had always had ideas but was never confident enough to assert them. With 'Beautiful Lies', she felt that she was a lot stronger and everything felt better. Birdy stated that where she had gone wrong with her second album had been that she had compromised too much, allowing others to influence her too much. In contrast, with 'Beautiful Lies' she had been 'really bossy'. In conclusion, she added that she loves writing for film and would love to do more; it was a 'really natural' progression for her work.

Birdy was featured on the cover of Wonderland magazine in the Autumn 2016 issue, with an accompanying shoot and interview. Speaking to the magazine, Birdy explained that her mother was a concert pianist and a lot of her family were very musical. Her mother would play classical music and her father would play "poppier records" like Tracy Chapman and The Beatles. It was a real mix of genres, she told the magazine.

Birdy performed two songs at the BFI Luminous fundraising gala on 3 October 2017. Interviewed at the function, she said she was writing material for her new album, but it was still in the early stages.

In December 2017, Variety.com reported that Warner/Chappell Music, the publishing arm of Warner Music Group, had signed Birdy to a global publishing deal. Mike Smith, Warner/Chappell UK managing director, said that Birdy was an incredible talent, there was a lot more to come from her and he looked forward to working with her in the years ahead.

After taking a break from music, Birdy released a new single, "Open Your Heart" on 4 September 2020. This was soon after accompanied with the announcement of a new EP, Piano Sketches, to be released on 6 November 2020. It features four tracks, primarily piano-based.

Birdy released her fourth album, Young Heart on 30 April 2021 which features 16 tracks. On the same day as the announcement, "Surrender", the first single from Young Heart was released. Her second single, "Loneliness" was released on 12 February.

=== 2023–present: Portraits ===
On 24 February 2023, Birdy announced she would be releasing the lead single "Raincatchers" on 3 March from her fifth studio album Portraits, released on August 18. Three more singles followed: "Heartbreaker" in April, "Your Arms" in June, and "Paradise Calling" in July 2023.

In 2023, singer-songwriter Essence Martins joined Birdy's touring band as a backing vocalist, guitarist and keyboardist.

== Use in education ==
Country	Song	Educational use
Australia	Skinny Love	The song is listed as a selection for the Preliminary level of Modern Singing in the 2025–27 singing examination syllabus published by ANZCA Music Examinations.
Australia	Not About Angels	The song is listed as a selection for Grade 2 of Modern Singing in ANZCA's 2025–27 singing examination syllabus.
United Kingdom	People Help the People	The song is included in Vocals Grade 3, a Rockschool singing examination book published by RSL Awards.
United Kingdom	Just a Game	An arrangement of the song published in a Faber music collection is listed in Trinity College London's official repertoire list as an own-choice piece for both vocals and keyboards at Grade 3 of its Rock & Pop examinations.
United Kingdom	Skinny Love	Bolton Music Service recommends Birdy's version of the song in its vocal teaching resource Vocal Skills Ladder for practising smooth transitions between the lower and upper vocal registers.
Ireland	People Help the People	Birdy's version is listed as a selection for Grade VI in the Music Theatre & Popular Singing section of the Royal Irish Academy of Music (RIAM) voice examination syllabus.
Ireland	Not About Angels	The song is listed as a selection for Grade VII in the Music Theatre & Popular Singing section of the RIAM voice examination syllabus.
Ecuador	People Help the People	Birdy's recording was among the songs used in a 2019 study of English vocabulary and pronunciation teaching at the National University of Loja. The study was published in Kronos in 2021.

For additional information, see the Japanese-language Wikipedia article on Birdy.

== Films ==
Birdy's music has appeared in the films and on the soundtracks of The Hunger Games (2012), Brave (2012), The Fault in Our Stars (2014), Beyond the Lights (2014), The Edge of Seventeen (2016), and the Netflix show Persuasion (2022).

== Discography ==
Studio albums

- Birdy (2011)
- Fire Within (2013)
- Beautiful Lies (2016)
- Young Heart (2021)
- Portraits (2023)

== Awards and nominations ==
Year	Award	Category	Nominee	Result	Ref.
2012	Satellite Awards	Best Original Song	"Learn Me Right" with Mumford & Sons	Nominated	
2013	Houston Film Critics Society	Best Original Song	"Learn Me Right" with Mumford & Sons	Nominated	
2013	Critics' Choice Movie Awards	Best Song	"Learn Me Right" with Mumford & Sons	Nominated	
2014	Brit Awards	British Female Solo Artist	Herself	Nominated	
2014	Echo Music Prize	Best International Rock/Pop Female Artist	Herself	Won	
2014	LOS40 Music Awards	Best International New Artist	Herself	Won	
2014	LOS40 Music Awards	Best International Album	Fire Within	Nominated	
2022	Pop Awards	Female Artist of the Year	Herself	Won	

== Bibliography ==
- Birdy (1 October 2019), Birdy: The Piano Songbook, London: Faber Music Limited, ISBN 978-0-571-54118-8
