= Beth Orton discography =

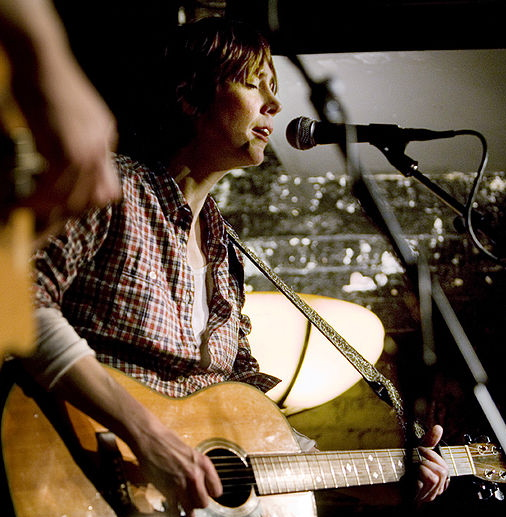
- Orton performing in March 2009
- Studio albums: 9
- EPs: 3
- Compilation albums: 2
- Singles: 20
- Music videos: 13
- Other appearances: 26

The discography of Beth Orton, an English folktronica singer-songwriter, consists of nine studio albums, two compilation albums, three extended plays, twenty singles (including two promotional releases) and thirteen music videos. Orton debuted in 1993 as the singer of the duo Spill, a collaboration with William Orbit. The two released one single, a cover of John Martyn's song "Don't Wanna Know 'Bout Evil".

Orton's solo debut studio album, Superpinkymandy, was released in November 1993. Produced with Orbit, it was only released in Japan. Trailer Park, her second studio album, was released in 1996. It reached number sixty-eight on the United Kingdom albums chart and earned Orton two Brit Award nominations. Four singles, "I Wish I Never Saw the Sunshine", "She Cries Your Name", "Touch Me with Your Love" and "Someone's Daughter", were released from the album: "She Cries Your Name" peaked at number forty in the UK. The studio album Central Reservation followed in March 1999. It reached number seventeen in the UK and number thirty-five in New Zealand. Two singles were released from the album: "Stolen Car" and "Central Reservation", with both songs charting in the United States and the UK.

Orton worked extensively with producers Victor Van Vugt and Ben Watt in recording her fourth studio album, Daybreaker, which was released in July 2002. It peaked at number eight in the UK and number forty on the US Billboard 200 – it was certified silver by the British Phonographic Industry (BPI). The album produced four singles, "Concrete Sky", "Carmella", "Anywhere" and "Thinking About Tomorrow". Comfort of Strangers, her fifth studio album, followed in September 2006. It charted within the top 50 of the Australian and UK album charts. Three singles, "Conceived", "Shopping Trolley" and "Heart of Soul", were released from the album: "Conceived" reached number forty-four in the UK. Orton's sixth studio album, Sugaring Season, was released in October 2012. Produced by Tucker Martine, the album peaked at number twenty-six in the UK and number ninety on the US Billboard 200. Three singles were released from the album: "Something More Beautiful", "Magpie" and "Call Me the Breeze".

== Albums ==
=== Studio albums ===
List of studio albums, with selected chart positions and certifications
Title	Album details	Peak chart positions					Certifications
Title	Album details	UK	AUS	NZ	SWE	US	Certifications
Superpinkymandy	Released: 24 November 1993 (JPN); Label: Toshiba EMI (TOCP7984); Format: CD	—	—	—	—	—	
Trailer Park	Released: 1996 (UK); Labels: Heavenly, Dedicated (HVNLP17CD); Formats: CD, DD, LP	68	84	—	—	—	BPI: Platinum
Central Reservation	Released: 9 March 1999 (UK); Labels: Heavenly, Dedicated (HVNLP22CD); Formats: CD, DD, LP	17	37	35	—	110	BPI: Gold
Daybreaker	Released: 16 July 2002 (UK); Labels: Heavenly, Astralwerks (HVNLP37CD); Formats: CD, DD, LP	8	14	29	17	40	BPI: Silver
Comfort of Strangers	Released: 7 February 2006 (UK); Labels: EMI, Astralwerks (3534012); Formats: CD, DD, LP	24	40	—	51	92	
Sugaring Season	Released: 1 October 2012 (UK); Labels: Anti-, Epitaph (271182); Formats: CD, DD, LP	26	—	—	—	90	
Kidsticks	Released: 27 May 2016 (UK); Labels: Anti-; Formats: CD, DD, LP	40	47	—	—	—	
Weather Alive	Released: 23 September 2022; Label: Partisan; Formats: CD, DD, LP	27	—	—	—	—	
The Ground Above	Released: 27 June 2026; Label: Partisan; Formats: CD, DD, LP	85	—	—	—	—	
"—" denotes release that did not chart or was not released in that territory.

=== Compilation albums ===
List of compilation albums, with selected chart positions
Title	Album details	Peak chart positions		Certifications
Title	Album details	UK	AUS	Certifications
The Other Side of Daybreak	Released: 2 September 2003 (US); Labels: Astralwerks, EMI (ASC92266); Formats: CD, DD	—	—	
Pass in Time: The Definitive Collection	Released: 7 October 2003 (UK); Labels: Heavenly, BMG (HVNLP45CD); Formats: CD, DD	45	59	BPI: Silver
"—" denotes release that did not chart or was not released in that territory.

== Extended plays ==
List of extended plays
Title	EP details
Best Bit (featuring Terry Callier)	Released: 29 November 1997 (UK); Labels: Heavenly, Dedicated (HVN72CD); Format: CD
Concrete Sky	Released: 15 July 2002 (UK); Labels: Heavenly, Astralwerks (HVN115CD); Formats: CD, DD
Discover Beth Orton	Released: 25 July 2008 (UK); Label: Sony BMG; Format: DD

== Singles ==
=== As lead artist ===
List of singles as a lead artist, with selected chart positions, showing year released and album name
Title	Year	Peak chart positions					Album
Title	Year	UK	AUS	US AAA	US Alt.	US Dance	Album
"Don't Wanna Know 'Bout Evil" (with William Orbit)	1993	—	—	—	—	—	Superpinkymandy
"She Cries Your Name"	1996	40	142	—	—	—	Trailer Park
"Touch Me with Your Love"	1997	60	—	—	—	—	Trailer Park
"Someone's Daughter"	1997	49	—	—	—	—	Trailer Park
"Best Bit"	1997	36	—	—	—	—	Best Bit
"Stolen Car"	1999	34	124	9	32	—	Central Reservation
"Central Reservation"	1999	37	—	—	—	43	Central Reservation
"Concrete Sky"	2002	—	—	14	—	—	Daybreaker
"Anywhere"	2002	55	—	—	—	—	Daybreaker
"Thinking About Tomorrow"	2003	57	—	—	—	—	Daybreaker
"Conceived"	2005	44	—	4	—	—	Comfort of Strangers
"Shopping Trolley"	2006	87	—	—	—	—	Comfort of Strangers
"Heart of Soul"	2006	—	—	—	—	—	Comfort of Strangers
"Something More Beautiful"	2012	—	—	—	—	—	Sugaring Season
"Magpie"	2012	—	—	—	—	—	Sugaring Season
"Call Me the Breeze"	2012	—	—	—	—	—	Sugaring Season
"Moon"	2016	—	—	—	—	—	Kidsticks
"I Never Asked to Be Your Mountain" (with The Chemical Brothers)	2018	—	—	—	—	—	Non-album single
"—" denotes release that did not chart or was not released in that territory.

=== Promotional singles ===
List of promotional singles, showing year released and album name
Title	Year	Album
"I Wish I Never Saw the Sunshine"	1996	Trailer Park
"Carmella"	2002	Daybreaker

=== As a featured artist ===
List of singles as a featured artist, with selected chart positions, showing year released and album name
Title	Year	Peak chart positions		Album
Title	Year	UK	US Dance	Album
"Dice" (Finley Quaye and William Orbit)	2004	—	—	Much More Than Much Love
"Sing" (Annie Lennox featuring Various Artists)	2007	161	18	Songs of Mass Destruction
"—" denotes release that did not chart or was not released in that territory.

== Other appearances ==
List of non-single appearances, with other performing artists, showing year released and album name
Title	Year	Other artist(s)	Album
"Water From a Vine Leaf"	1993	William Orbit	Strange Cargo III
"Snapper"	1994	Red Snapper	Snapper EP
"In Deep"	1994	Red Snapper	The Swank EP
"Alive Alone"	1995	The Chemical Brothers	Exit Planet Dust
"Kiss of the Bee"	1995	William Orbit	Strange Cargo Hinterland
"Million Town"	1995	William Orbit	Strange Cargo Hinterland
"She Cries Your Name"	1995	William Orbit	Strange Cargo Hinterland
"Where Do I Begin"	1997	The Chemical Brothers	Dig Your Own Hole
"Love Can Do"	1999	Terry Callier	Lifetime
"Beautiful Way"	1999	Beck	Midnite Vultures
"Untouchable Part 2"	2001	Princess Superstar	Princess Superstar Is
"Brown Sugar"	2001	Ryan Adams	Gimme Shelter Vol. 1
"The State We're In"	2002	The Chemical Brothers	Come with Us
"O-o-h Child"	2003	—N/a	Hope
"Wild World"	2003	—N/a	How to Deal Soundtrack
"Thinking About Tomorrow"	2003	—N/a	How to Deal Soundtrack
"Inside"	2004	New Buffalo	The Last Beautiful Day
"Sisters of Mercy"	2006	—N/a	Leonard Cohen: I'm Your Man
"Frankie"	2006	—N/a	The Harry Smith Project: Anthology of American Folk Music Revisited
"Katie Cruel"	2006	Bert Jansch and Devendra Banhart	The Black Swan
"Watch the Stars"	2006	Bert Jansch and Kevin Barker	The Black Swan
"When the Sun Comes Up"	2006	Bert Jansch	The Black Swan
"What a Wonderful World"	2008	—N/a	Winter Wonderland
"I Me Mine" / "Dig It"	2010	—N/a	Let It Be Revisited
"You Better Mind"	2010	Sam Amidon	I See the Sign
"Superstar" / "Diamonds and Rust"	2011	Justin Vivian Bond	Dendrophilia
"Bamboo (River Come Down)"	2013	—N/a	Son of Rogues Gallery: Pirate Ballads, Sea Songs & Chanteys

== Music videos ==
List of music videos, showing year released and director
Title	Year	Director(s)
"She Cries Your Name"	1996	Ellen Nolan
"Touch Me With Your Love"	1997	Ellen Nolan
"Someone's Daughter"	1997	—N/a
"Best Bit"	1997	Steve Hanft
"Stolen Car"	1999	Hal Hartley
"Central Reservation"	1999	Hal Hartley
"Concrete Sky" (Version one)	2002	Mike Mills
"Concrete Sky" (Version two)	2002	Gina Birch
"Anywhere"	2002	Intro
"Conceived"	2005	Huse Monfaradi
"Shopping Trolley"	2006	Karni and Saul
"Something More Beautiful"	2012	—N/a
"Magpie"	2012	Arni & Kinski
