= Heavenly Recordings discography =

This is a discography of the UK independent record label Heavenly Recordings.

== Discography ==
=== Albums ===
Catalog number	Year	Artist	Title	Notes
HVNLP1	1991	Saint Etienne	Foxbase Alpha	
HVNLP2	1992	The Rockingbirds	The Rockingbirds	
HVNLP3	1993	East Village	Drop Out	
HVNLP4	1991	The Wishing Stones	Wildwood	
HVNLP5	N/A	Espiritu	Always...	unissued
HVNLP6	1993	Saint Etienne	So Tough	
HVNLP7	1993	Saint Etienne	You Need a Mess of Help to Stand Alone	
HVNLP8	1994	Saint Etienne	Tiger Bay	
HVNLP9	1995	Saint Etienne	I Love to Paint	
HVNLP10	1995	Saint Etienne	Too Young to Die: Singles 1990–1995	compilation
HVNLP11	1996	Various artists	Annie on One	
HVNLP12	1996	Northern Uproar	Northern Uproar	
HVNLP13	1996	The Chemical Brothers	Live at the Social, Volume 1	
HVNLP14	1996	Various artists	High in a Basement	
HVNLP15				
HVNLP16	1996	Saint Etienne	Casino Classics	
HVNLP17	1996	Beth Orton	Trailer Park	
HVNLP18				
HVNLP19	1997	Northern Uproar	Yesterday Tomorrow Today	
HVNLP20				
HVNLP21				
HVNLP22	1999	Beth Orton	Central Reservation	
HVNLP23				
HVNLP24	1999	Dot Allison	Afterglow	
HVNLP25				
HVNLP26	2000	Doves	Lost Souls	
HVNLP27	2000	Ed Harcourt	Maplewood EP	
HVNLP28				
HVNLP29	2000	Doves	Lost Sides (promo)	
HVNLP30				
HVNLP31	2001	Ed Harcourt	Here Be Monsters	
HVNLP32	2001	Saint Etienne	Smash the System: Singles and More	compilation
HVNLP33				
HVNLP34				
HVNLP35	2002	Doves	The Last Broadcast	
HVNLP36	2002	The Vines	Highly Evolved	
HVNLP37	2002	Beth Orton	Daybreaker	
HVNLP38				
HVNLP39	2003	Ed Harcourt	From Every Sphere	
HVNLP40				
HVNLP41				
HVNLP42				
HVNLP43				
HVNLP44				
HVNLP45	2003	Beth Orton	Pass in Time: The Definitive Collection	compilation
HVNLP46	2003	Doves	Lost Sides	
HVNLP47				
HVNLP48				
HVNLP49	2004	Ed Harcourt	Strangers	
HVNLP50	2005	Doves	Some Cities	
HVNLP51				
HVNLP52				
HVNLP53	2005	The Magic Numbers	The Magic Numbers	
HVNLP54	2005	Ed Harcourt	Elephant's Graveyard	
HVNLP55	2006	Ed Harcourt	The Beautiful Lie	
HVNLP56				
HVNLP57	2006	The Magic Numbers	Those the Brokes	
HVNLP58				
HVNLP59	2007	Cherry Ghost	Thirst for Romance	
HVNLP60				
HVNLP61				
HVNLP62				
HVNLP63	2007	Ed Harcourt	Until Tomorrow Then: The Best of Ed Harcourt	
HVNLP64				
HVNLP65				
HVNLP66				
HVNLP67	2009	Doves	Kingdom of Rust	
HVNLP68				
HVNLP69	2009	Saint Etienne	London Conversations: The Best of Saint Etienne	compilation
HVNLP70	2009	Saint Etienne	Continental – Deluxe Edition	reissue
HVNLP71				
HVNLP72	2009	Saint Etienne	Sound of Water – Deluxe Edition	reissue
HVNLP73	2010	The Magic Numbers	The Runaway	
HVNLP74				
HVNLP75				
HVNLP76	2010	The Soft Pack	The Soft Pack	
HVNLP77				
HVNLP78	2010	Doves	The Places Between: The Best of Doves	compilation
HVNLP79	2010	Cherry Ghost	Beneath This Burning Shoreline	
HVNLP80		Saint Etienne	"Tales from Turnpike House"	
HVNLP81		Edwyn Collins	"Losing Sleep"	
HVNLP82		Sea of Bees	"Songs for the Ravens"	
HVNLP83		LCMDF	"Love & Nature"	
HVNLP84		James Walbourne	"The Hill"	
HVNLP85		The Head and the Heart	"The Head And The Heart"	
HVNLP86		Trevor Moss & Hannah-Lou	“Tin Tabernacle”	
HVNLP87		Trevor & Hannah-Lou	“Quality, First, Last & Forever!”	
HVNLP88		Fionn Regan	“100 Acres of Sycamore”	
HVNLP89		Various artists	"FOLKROCK"	
HVNLP90		James Levy & the Blood Red Rose	“Pray to Be Free”	
HVNLP91		Stealing Sheep	“Noah and the Paper Moon”	
HVNLP92		Saint Etienne	“Words and Music”	
HVNLP93		Sea of Bees	“Orangefarben”	
HVNLP94		Toy	“Toy”	
HVNLP95		Stealing Sheep	“Into the Diamond Sun”	
HVNLP96		Out Cold	“Invasion of Love"	
HVNLP97				
HVNLP98		Mark Lanegan & Duke Garwood	"Black Pudding"	
HVNLP99		Charlie Boyer & the Voyeurs	"Clarietta"	
HVNLP100		Temples	"Sun Structures"	
HVNLP101		Mark Lanegan	"Imitations"	
HVNLP102		Toy	"Join the Dots"	

=== Singles and EPs ===
==== HVN 1–100 ====
- HVN 1 - "The World According To Sly & Lovechild", Sly & Lovechild (1990)
- HVN 2 - "Only Love Can Break Your Heart", Saint Etienne (1990)
- HVN 3 - "It's On", "Flowered Up" (1990)
- HVN 4 - "Kiss and Make Up", Saint Etienne (1990)
- HVN 6 - "Circles", East Village (1990)
- HVN 7 - "Phobia", "Flowered Up" (1990)
- HVN 8 - "Motown Junk", Manic Street Preachers (1991)
- HVN 9 - "Nothing Can Stop Us", Saint Etienne (1991)
- HVN 10 - "You Love Us", Manic Street Preachers (1991)
- HVN 11 - "Destined to be free/There's a riot going on" Fabulous (1991)
- HVN 14 - "A Good Day For You", The Rockingbirds (1991)
- HVN 15 - "Join Our Club", Saint Etienne (1992)
- HVN 16 - "Weekender", Flowered Up (1992)
- HVN 17 - "Jonathan, Jonathan", The Rockingbirds (1992)
- HVN 19 - The Fred EP, Flowered Up, Saint Etienne and The Rockingbirds (1992)
- HVN 20 - "Francisca", Espiritu (1992)
- HVN 21 - "Gradually Learning", The Rockingbirds (1992)
- HVN 23 - "Avenue", Saint Etienne (1992)
- HVN 25 - "You're in a Bad Way", Saint Etienne (1993)
- HVN 28 - "Conquistador", Espiritu (1993)
- HVN 29 - "Hobart Paving", Saint Etienne (1993)
- HVN 36 - "Xmas 93", Saint Etienne (1993)
- HVN 37 - "Pale Movie", Saint Etienne (1994)
- HVN 40 - "Like a Motorway", Saint Etienne (1994)
- HVN 42 - "Hug My Soul", Saint Etienne (1994)
- HVN 47 - "Rollercoaster/Rough Boys", Northern Uproar (1995)
- HVN 50 - "He's on the Phone", Saint Etienne (1995)
- HVN 51 - "From a Window/This Morning", Northern Uproar (1996)
- HVN 52 - "Livin' It Up", Northern Uproar (1996)
- HVN 53 - "Work Mi Body", Monkey Mafia featuring Patra (1996)
- HVN 54 - "Town", Northern Uproar (1996)
- HVN 60 - "She Cries Your Name", Beth Orton (1996)
- HVN 64 - "Touch Me with Your Love", Beth Orton (1996)
- HVN 65 - "Someone's Daughter", Beth Orton (1997)
- HVN 68 - "She Cries Your Name", Beth Orton (1997)
- HVN 69 - The Blue Man EP, Famous Times (1997)
- HVN 70 - "Any Way You Look", Northern Uproar (1997)
- HVN 72 - "Best Bit", Beth Orton (1997)
- HVN 73 - "A Girl I Once Knew", Northern Uproar (1997)
- HVN 77 - "Goodbye", Northern Uproar (1997)
- HVN 87 - "Mo' Pop", Dot Allison (1999)
- HVN 89 - "Stolen Car", Beth Orton (1999)
- HVN 91 - "Message Personnel", Dot Allison (1999)
- HVN 93 - "Close Your Eyes", Dot Allison (1999)
- HVN 95 - "The Cedar Room", Doves (2000)
- HVN 96 - "Catch the Sun", Doves (2000)
- HVN 98 - "The Man Who Told Everything", Doves (2000)
- HVN 100 - NME Presents: A Taste of Heavenly Recordings, Various (2002)

==== HVN 101–200 ====
- HVN 101 - "Something in My Eye", Ed Harcourt (2001)
- HVN 104 - "She Fell Into My Arms", Ed Harcourt (2001)
- HVN 107 - "Apple of My Eye", Ed Harcourt (2002)
- HVN 110 - "Shanghai", Ed Harcourt (2002) [cancelled release]
- HVN 111 - "There Goes the Fear", Doves (2002)
- HVN 112 - "Highly Evolved", The Vines (2002)
- HVN 113 - "Get Free", The Vines (2002)
- HVN 116 - "Pounding", Doves (2002)
- HVN 120 - "Outtathaway!", The Vines (2002)
- HVN 121 - "Still I Dream of It"/"The Ghosts Parade", Ed Harcourt (2002)
- HVN 125 - "Anywhere", Beth Orton (2002)
- HVN 126 - "Caught by the River", Doves (2002)
- HVN 127 - "All of Your Days Will Be Blessed", Ed Harcourt (2003)
- HVN 129 - "Thinking About Tomorrow", Beth Orton (2002)
- HVN 130 - "Watching the Sun Come Up", Ed Harcourt (2003)
- HVN 140 - "This One's for You", Ed Harcourt (2004)
- HVN 144 - "22 Days", 22-20s (2004)
- HVN 145 - "Black and White Town", Doves (2005)
- HVN 146 - "Born in the '70s", Ed Harcourt (2004)
- HVN 149 - "Loneliness", Ed Harcourt (2005)
- HVN 150 - "Snowden", Doves (2005)
- HVN 151 - "Forever Lost", The Magic Numbers (2005)
- HVN 152 - "Sky Starts Falling", Doves (2005)
- HVN 157 - "Visit from the Dead Dog", Ed Harcourt (2006)
- HVN 161 - "Revolution in the Heart", Ed Harcourt (2006)
- HVN 167 - "Mathematics", Cherry Ghost (2007)
- HVN 168 - "People Help the People", Cherry Ghost (2007)
- HVN 171 - "4 AM", Cherry Ghost (2007)
- HVN 172 - "You Put a Spell on Me", Ed Harcourt (2007)
- HVN 183 - "Burnt Out Car", Saint Etienne (2008)
- HVN 185 - "Method of Modern Love", Saint Etienne (2009)
- HVN 189 - "Kingdom of Rust", Doves (2009)
- HVN 192 - "Winter Hill", Doves (2009)

==== HVN 201–300 ====
- HVN 201 - "Andalucia", Doves (2010)
- HVN202 – "Lines Written in Winter", Fionn Regan
- HVN203 – "Kissing Strangers", Cherry Ghost
- HVN204 – "Why Did You Call", The Magic Numbers
- HVN205 – "Losing Sleep", Edwyn Collins
- HVN206 – "Black Fang", Cherry Ghost
- HVN207 – "The Woods", Sea of Bees
- HVN208 – (Rough Trade bonus disc), Edwyn Collins
- HVN209 – "We Sleep on Stones", Cherry Ghost
- HVN210 - "Gandhi (Andy Weather¬all remix I)", LCMDF
- HVN211 – "Do It Again", Edwyn Collins
- HVN212 – "No One but You", Doug Paisley
- HVN213 – "Lost in My Mind", The Head & The Heart
- HVN214 – "Future Me", LCMDF
- HVN215 – "Wizbot", Sea of Bees
- HVN216 – "The Hill", James Walbourne
- HVN217 – Bee Eee Pee (EP), Sea of Bees
- HVN218 – "I'm Bored", Big Kids
- HVN219 – "In Your Eyes", Edwyn Collins & The Drums
- HVN220 – 3-track EP download ("Passing of Time" - Trevor Moss & Hannah-Lou, "BBC" - James Walbourne, "The Woods" – Sea of Bees)
- HVN221 – "Spin Me a Rhyme", Trevor Moss & Hannah-Lou
- HVN222 – "Only a Mother", Cherry Ghost
- HVN223 – "Gnomes", Sea of Bees
- HVN224 – "Extinction", Will Seargent
- HVN225 – "Cool & Bored", LCMDF
- HVN226 – "Making It Count", Trevor Moss & Hannah-Lou
- HVN227 – "Rivers & Roads", The Head And The Heart
- HVN228 – "For a Nightingale", Fionn Regan
- HVN229 – "Take Me to the Mountains", LCMDF
- HVN230 – "Drugs and Money", James Walbourne
- HVN231 – "Pray to Be Free", James Levy & The Blood Red Rose
- HVN232 – "Ghosts", The Head and The Heart
- HVN233 – "Left Myself Behind", Toy
- HVN234 – "Big Water", Trevor Moss and Hannah-Lou
- HVN235 – "List of Distractions", Fionn Regan
- HVN236 – Sneak Into My Room (EP), James Levy & The Blood Red Rose
- HVN237 – Xmas '11 EP, Saint Etienne
- HVN238 – "Tonight", Saint Etienne
- HVN239 – "Broke", Sea of Bees
- HVN240 – "Shut Eye", Stealing Sheep
- HVN241 – "Motoring", Toy
- HVN242 – Promo EP, Toy
- HVN243 – "I've Got Your Music", Saint Etienne
- HVN244 – "Hung to Dry", James Levy and The Blood Red Rose
- HVN245 – "Genevieve", Stealing Sheep
- HVN246 – "Dead and Gone", Toy
- HVN247 – "Lose My Way", Toy
- HVNCB – "Ducks", Charlie Boyer
- HVN249 – "I Watch You", Charlie Boyer and The Voyeurs
