= The Other Side of Daybreak =

Compilation album by Beth Orton
- Released: 29 September 2003
- Recorded: 2002–2003
- Genre: Downtempo
- Label: Astralwerks
- Producers: Jude Cole, Kieran Hebden, Victor Van Vugt, Ben Watt

Beth Orton chronology
Daybreaker (2002)	The Other Side of Daybreak (2003)	Pass in Time (2003)

Professional ratings
Aggregate scores
Source	Rating
Metacritic	66/100
Review scores
Source	Rating
AllMusic	3/5 stars
The New Rolling Stone Album Guide	3/5 stars
Slant Magazine	3/5 stars

The Other Side of Daybreak is a compilation album by Beth Orton, released by Astralwerks in 2003. It is mainly a collection of b-sides from the singles found on 2002's Daybreaker, along with some remixes of tracks from the album.

== Track listing ==
1. "Ooh Child" (alternate version) – 3:53
2. "Thinking About Tomorrow" (IPG Dub Remix) – 5:49
3. "Ali's Waltz" – 3:25
4. "Daybreaker" (Four Tet Remix) – 5:05
5. "Bobby Gentry" – 5:30
6. "Carmella" (Four Tet Remix) – 11:38
7. "Beautiful World" – 4:06
8. "Concrete Sky" (acoustic; recorded live at WXRT Chicago, 4 June 2002) – 4:59
9. "Daybreaker" (Roots Manuva Remix) – 4:34
10. "Anywhere" (Two Lone Swordsmen Remix Vocal) – 5:55

Some versions are enhanced CDs that include the video for either "Anywhere (Two Lone Swordsmen Remix Edit)" or "Concrete Sky (Version 2)."
