= Central reservation (disambiguation) =

A central reservation is the area separating opposing lanes of traffic on a divided road

Central reservation or central reservations may also refer to:

- Central Reservation (album), a 1999 album by Beth Orton
- "Central Reservation" (song), a 1999 song by Beth Orton
- Central Reservations, a 1997 compilation album from Grand Central Records
- Central Reservations Office, a call center for hotel reservations
