= Central Reservation (album) =

Studio album by Beth Orton
- Released: 9 March 1999
- Studio: The Church · September Sound · RAK · Olympic · Little Joey's · The Garden Shed
- Genre: Folktronica
- Length: 58:50
- Label: Heavenly Records – HVNLP 22
- Producers: Victor Van Vugt, Ben Watt, Mark Stent, Beth Orton, Dr. Robert, David Roback

Beth Orton chronology
Best Bit (1997)	Central Reservation (1999)	Daybreaker (2002)

Central Reservation is the third studio album by English singer-songwriter Beth Orton, released on 9 March 1999. The album featured contributions from folk musician Terry Callier (with whom she also recorded the B-side "Lean on Me"), Dr. Robert and Ben Harper. Several tracks were also produced by Ben Watt of Everything but the Girl.

Central Reservation received critical acclaim and garnered Orton a second Mercury Music Prize nomination, and won her the Brit Award for British Female Solo Artist in 2000.

== Release ==
Central Reservation was released on 9 March 1999 on Heavenly Records. It reached number 17 on the UK Albums Chart and stayed on the chart for eight weeks. It went to number 34 on the ARIA albums chart in Australia, number 35 on the RIANZ albums chart in New Zealand and number 110 on the Billboard 200 chart in the United States. It also went to number two on the US Heatseekers albums chart. By 2002 it had sold 244,000 copies in United States. The first single from the album was "Stolen Car", which was released on 13 March 1999 and peaked at number 34 on the UK Singles Chart. "Central Reservation", the second single, peaked at number 37 on the UK Singles Chart.

On 30 June 2014, British independent record label 3 Loop Music re-released Central Reservation as a two-CD expanded edition which included B-sides, original demos and live recordings.

== Critical reception ==
Professional ratings
Aggregate scores
Source	Rating
Metacritic	84/100
Review scores
Source	Rating
AllMusic	4.5/5 stars
Entertainment Weekly	A−
The Guardian	3/5 stars
Los Angeles Times	3/4 stars
Melody Maker	4/5 stars
NME	8/10
Pitchfork	8.9/10
Rolling Stone	3.5/5 stars
Spin	7/10
Uncut	5/5 stars

Central Reservation received generally positive reviews from critics. Jason Ankeny of AllMusic lauded it as a "stunning" record which "slips free of the electronic textures" of Orton's previous album Trailer Park (1996), "stripping her music down to its raw essentials to produce a work of stark simplicity and rare poignancy." Entertainment Weekly writer Rob Brunner deemed Central Reservation more cohesive than Trailer Park, saying that although Orton's move towards a more acoustic sound would likely "rankle her hipster champions", "sometimes it's enough just to let a great singer sing". Melody Maker's Sharon O'Connell called it an album of "self-doubt, regret and philosophical resignation" anchored by Orton's "sweet, gorgeously roughened" vocals. In NME, David Stubbs stated that "what's most compelling about Central Reservation is that it picks up a songwriting tradition harking back to the days of Tim Buckley, Terry Callier ... and, especially, John Martyn", while Nigel Williamson of Uncut credited Orton for "lovingly shaping her influences into something that is fresh and original and entirely contemporary."

Writing for Rolling Stone, Rob Sheffield found that Central Reservation, despite lacking the accessibility of Trailer Park, "generates a special buzz of its own, and whenever Orton opens her mouth, she's bitching and bewitching". Joshua Clover commented in Spin that Orton's songs have "nothing to say", but are performed "with one of the most remarkable voices in creation ... so clear it renders the ideas of cred, edges, and great albums irrelevant; for a half-record, we'll settle for amazing grace." In a less enthusiastic review for The Guardian, Caroline Sullivan described Orton as a "simultaneously frustrating and rewarding" vocalist, noting that "her tendency to drift leads to an occasional lack of focus".

Orton won the Brit Award for British Female Solo Artist at the 2000 Brit Awards. Central Reservation was ranked number 982 in the 2000 edition of All-Time Top 1000 Albums, and it was later included in the book 1001 Albums You Must Hear Before You Die.

== Track listing ==
All tracks are written by Beth Orton except "Love Like Laughter" by Orton and Ted Barnes

Standard edition
No.	Title	Producer(s)	Length
1.	"Stolen Car"	Victor Van Vugt	5:26
2.	"Sweetest Decline"	Van Vugt	5:40
3.	"Couldn't Cause Me Harm"	Van Vugt	4:48
4.	"So Much More"	Van Vugt	5:41
5.	"Pass in Time"	Bruce Robert Howard	7:17
6.	"Central Reservation"	Orton, Mark Stent	4:50
7.	"Stars All Seem To Weep"	Ben Watt	4:39
8.	"Love Like Laughter"	Van Vugt	3:06
9.	"Blood Red River"	Orton, David Roback	4:15
10.	"Devil Song"	Roback	5:04
11.	"Feel to Believe"	Orton	4:02
12.	"Central Reservation" (The Then Again Version)	Watt	4:00

Japanese edition (bonus track)
No.	Title	Producer(s)	Length
13.	"Precious Maybe"	Orton	4:02

Australian edition (bonus tracks)
No.	Title	Producer(s)	Length
14.	"Best Bit"	Youth	4:03
15.	"Central Reservation" (Spiritual Life/Ibadan edit)	Orton; Jerome Sydenham^{[a]}; Joe Claussell^{[a]}	4:04
16.	"Central Reservation" (William Orbit remix)	Orton; Orbit^{[a]}	4:43

Cherry Red Records expanded edition – Disc two
No.	Title	Length
1.	"Someone's Daughter"
2.	"Sweetest Decline"
3.	"Blood Red River"
4.	"Pass in Time"
5.	"She Cries Your Name"
6.	"Devil Song"
7.	"I Wish I'd Never Seen the Sunshine"
8.	"Stars All Seem to Weep"
9.	"I Love How You Love Me"
10.	"Precious Maybe"
11.	"Stars All Seem to Weep" (shed version)
12.	"Central Reservation" (spiritual life ibadon remix)
13.	"Love Like Laughter"
14.	"So Much More"
15.	"Central Reservation" (band demo)
16.	"Couldn't Cause Me Harm"

Notes

- ^{^a} signifies remixer

== Personnel ==
Music

- Ted Barnes — acoustic guitar, bouzouki, guitar, slide guitar
- Will Blanchard — drums
- Terry Callier — background vocals
- Calina de la Mare — violin
- Dr. Robert — guitar
- Beki Doe — violin
- Dr. John — piano
- David Friedman — vibraphone
- Ali Friend — bass
- Lascelles Gordon — percussion
- Howard Gott — violin
- Ruth Gottlieb — violin
- Ben Harper — electric guitar
- Oliver Kraus — cello
- Henry Olsen — bass
- Beth Orton — acoustic guitar, guitar, vocals
- Sean Read — piano, keyboards
- Becca Ware — viola
- Andy Waterworth — double bass
- Ben Watt — guitar, keyboards
- Lucy Wilkins — violin
- Sara Wilson — cello

Production

- Andy Bradfield — mixing
- Dr. Robert — producer, mixing
- Beki Doe — mixing
- Giles Hall — engineer
- Peter Hill — assistant engineer
- Oliver Kraus — mixing
- Dick Meaney — engineer
- Beth Orton — producer
- David Roback — producer, mixing
- Trevor Smith — engineer
- Mark "Spike" Stent — producer
- Victor Van Vugt — producer, engineer
- Paul Walton — mixing assistant
- Ben Watt — programming, noise, producer, engineer, mixing
- John Wood — engineer
- Tim Young — mastering

Design

- Sam Harris — photography

== Charts ==
Chart (1999)	Peak position
Australian Albums (ARIA)	37
New Zealand Albums (RMNZ)	35
Scottish Albums (Official Charts)	25
UK Albums (Official Charts)	17
US Billboard 200	110
US Heatseekers Albums (Billboard)	2

== Certifications and sales ==
Region	Certification	Certified units/sales
United Kingdom (BPI)	Gold	100,000^{^}
United States	—	244,000
Summaries
Worldwide	—	478,000
^{^} Shipments figures based on certification alone.
