= Daybreaker (Beth Orton album) =

Studio album by Beth Orton
- Released: 16 July 2002
- Studio: Ridge Farm Studio · Surrey · Eastcote Studios
- Genres: Folktronica; downtempo; trip hop
- Length: 51:28
- Labels: Heavenly (UK) - HVNLP 37; Astralwerks (U.S.)
- Producers: Beth Orton, Victor Van Vugt, Ben Watt

Beth Orton chronology
Central Reservation (1999)	Daybreaker (2002)	The Other Side of Daybreak (2003)

Professional ratings
Aggregate scores
Source	Rating
Metacritic	70/100
Review scores
Source	Rating
AllMusic	3/5 stars
E! Online	B+
Mojo	4/5 stars
NME	(8/10)
Pitchfork	(4.8/10)
Rolling Stone	4/5 stars
Slant Magazine	4/5 stars
Spin	3/5 stars
Stylus Magazine	4/5 stars
Uncut	3/5 stars
Village Voice	(mixed)

Daybreaker is the fourth studio album by singer-songwriter Beth Orton released in 2002 on Heavenly Records and the Astralwerks Records label. The album reached #40 in US and #8 in UK. Mojo Magazine called the album "her best to date...". Q Magazine was not excited about the album: "Tortoise-pace strumming and a crippling shortage of choruses produce only torpor". The album earned Orton a nomination at the BRIT Awards for Best British Female Singer as well as Best Album at the Q Awards.

In an interview to Insound.com on 28 July 2002 she said about making the record:

"We recorded 25 songs in two weeks with the whole band. Then there's the stuff I did with Johnny. There's stuff all over the place. And these are the ten songs that ended up being on the record because for me they encapsulate the mood best of the time we are recording the album. It took about six months altogether. That's not too bad. It was probably actually a year because I was looking for someone to do the mixing and things weren't working out."

As of 2003 it has sold 169,000 copies in the United States.

== Track listing ==
1. "Paris Train" (Ted Barnes, Orton)
2. "Concrete Sky" (Johnny Marr, Orton)
3. "Mount Washington" (Orton)
4. "Anywhere" (Orton)
5. "Daybreaker" (Orton)
6. "Carmella" (Orton)
7. "God Song" (Orton)
8. "This One's Gonna Bruise" (Ryan Adams, Orton)
9. "Ted's Waltz" (Barnes, Orton)
10. "Thinking About Tomorrow" (Ted Barnes, Orton, Sean Read, Sebastian Steinberg)

The Japanese version features two bonus tracks: "Ali's Waltz" and "Bobby Gentry", both also on the Concrete Sky EP.

== Personnel ==
- Producer - Victor Van Vugt
- Additional production - Ben Watt
- Acoustic Guitar - Ted Barnes
- Drums - Will Blanchard
- Engineer - Richard "Dread" Mann
- Assistant Engineer - John McCormack
- Bass Guitar - Ali Friend
- Keyboards - Sean Read
- Mastered By - Miles Showell
- Mixer - Andy Bradfield, Ben Watt
- Ryan Adams - acoustic guitar on 'This One's Gonna Bruise', bass and slide guitar on 'God Song', piano, bass, guitars and backing vocals on 'Carmella' and 'Concrete Sky'

== Charts ==
=== Weekly charts ===
Weekly chart performance for Daybreaker
Chart (2002)	Peak position
Australian Albums (ARIA)	14
French Albums (SNEP)	119
New Zealand Albums (RMNZ)	29
Norwegian Albums (VG-lista)	25
Swedish Albums (Sverigetopplistan)	17
UK Albums (Official Charts)	8
US Billboard 200	40

=== Year-end charts ===
Year-end chart performance for Daybreaker
Chart (2002)	Position
Canadian Alternative Albums (Nielsen SoundScan)	165

== Certifications ==
Region	Certification	Certified units/sales
United Kingdom (BPI)	Silver	60,000^{^}
United States	—	169,000
^{^} Shipments figures based on certification alone.
