= Superpinkymandy =

SuperpinkyMandy

Studio album by Beth Orton
- Released: 1993
- Genres: Electronica, house, trip hop
- Label: Toshiba EMI
- Producer: William Orbit

Beth Orton chronology
SuperpinkyMandy (1993)	Trailer Park (1996)

SuperpinkyMandy is the debut studio album by British singer Beth Orton. Largely in the style of electronica, and produced closely with then boyfriend William Orbit, it was a limited Japan-only release, with about 5000 copies pressed. As such, it is very much sought after. Orton largely passes over the release when interviewed, citing 1996's Trailer Park as her first release. It has a dance influenced style rather than the folktronica sound of her subsequent albums.

"Don't Wanna Know 'bout Evil" and "Where Do You Go" would later appear on the collection Pass in Time.

"Don't Wanna Know 'bout Evil" is a cover of the song "Don't Want to Know" by John Martyn from his album Solid Air.

== Background ==
Orton began working with William Orbit on an LP together as Spill, entitled Burn Blind. "Don't Wanna Know 'Bout Evil" was the first track on the album that ended up being released in just Orton's name. Superpinkymandy, was named after a rag doll which she bought at a jumble sale at the age of six. The sound is very much Orbit's, but all of the songs (except "Don't Wanna Know 'Bout Evil") were co-written by Orton and Orbit, and some tracks were later recycled, in very different versions. "She Cries Your Name" later appeared on Trailer Park. "Yesterday's Gone" became "Montok Point" on the fourth Strange Cargo release, Hinterland (1995). Hinterland had Orton's vocals on several tracks, and also included an alternative version of "She Cries Your Name".

== Track listing ==
1. "Don't Wanna Know Bout Evil" – 5:33
2. "Faith Will Carry" – 6:11
3. "Yesterday's Gone" – 4:32
4. "She Cries Your Name" – 5:03
5. "When You Wake" – 4:11
6. "Roll the Dice" – 5:35
7. "City Blue" – 1:30
8. "The Prisoner" – 4:28
9. "Where Do You Go" – 3:45
10. "Release Me" – 4:56
