= Livin' It Up (Northern Uproar song) =

Single by Northern Uproar

from the album Northern Uproar
- B-side: "Stonefall" "Goodbye" "In My World"
- Released: 1 April 1996
- Studio: Monnow Valley
- Genre: Rock; Britpop
- Label: Heavenly
- Songwriters: Leon Meya, Paul Kelly
- Producer: Dave Eringa

Northern Uproar singles chronology
"From a Window/This Morning" (1996)	"Livin' It Up" (1996)	"Town" (1996)

"Livin' It Up" is a song by the English rock band Northern Uproar, released in April 1996 as the third single from their debut album, Northern Uproar. It peaked at number 24 on the UK Singles Chart.

== Track listing ==
UK CD single, 7-inch vinyl

1. "Livin' It Up"
2. "Stonefall"
3. "Goodbye"
4. "In My World"

== Credits and personnel ==
Credits taken from the Northern Uproar album booklet and CD single notes

Northern Uproar

- Leon Meya – bass guitar, lead vocals, backing vocals (track 1) songwriter (tracks 1-4)
- Keith Chadwick – drums
- Paul Kelly – guitar, songwriter (track 1, 4)
- Jeff Fletcher – guitar, backing vocals, songwriter (track 4)

Additional personnel

- Dave Eringa – producer
- James Dean Bradfield – backing vocals (track 1)

== Charts ==
Chart (1996)	Peak position
UK Singles (OCC)	24
