= Starky =

Australian power pop band

- Origin: Sydney, New South Wales, Australia
- Genres: Power pop; pop; rock
- Years active: 1998–2007
- Label: Universal Records
- Past members: Beau Cassidy; Nick Neal; David Simons; Brendan Clift; Graeme Trewin; Saul Foster; Peter Farley; Jonny Wilson; Wayne Lancaster; Jarred Gowan; Edward "Gene" Castelow

Starky were an Australian power pop band formed in 1998. The line-up was Beau Cassidy (vocals, guitar, keyboards), Nick Neal (bass guitar and spoons), and Jonny Wilson (guitar). Their first single, "Rock 'n' Roll is the Devils Music", was released in 1999 by Phantom Records, they were named Best New Talent by Channel V, and received $50,000 for a music video. In October 2003 their debut album, Mirror, Signal, Manoeuvre, was issued by Laughing Outlaw Records, which was produced by Rob Younger. It was the Feature Album on Australian youth radio station, Triple J.

On 12 August 2006 they released their self-titled album via Universal Records. The lead single, "Hey Bang Bang" debuted at No. 42 on the ARIA Singles Chart. It received considerable airplay on Triple J, and was nominated for the ARIA Award for Breakthrough Artist - Single at the ARIA Music Awards of 2006. On 28 July 2007, following their final show at the East Brunswick Hotel, Starky disbanded, which they announced via a MySpace blog.

== History ==
Starky formed in 1998 from half the members of Sydney pop band, Pennidredful, which had released a single and two extended plays, Money for Some Woollen Socks (May 1997) and The Ping Pong Delegate, on Phantom Records.

In 1999 Starky's debut single, "Rock 'n' Roll Is the Devil's Music" was released on Phantom. P G Gleeson opined that "The title track is not the initial grabber; rather a grower... with track two, 'Pencil Sketch', featuring Brian (Golden Rough) Crouch on keys, a quiet little ditty, and the closer, 'She's Gone', back to the foundation sound of the record."

Starky's line-up, in 2002, was Beau Cassidy on guitar and lead vocals, Nick Neal on bass guitar, David Simons on guitar and Brendan Clift on drums. They had toured the United States, Japan and France during that year.

Starky's debut album, Mirror, Signal, Manoeuvre, was released by Laughing Outlaw Records on 6 October 2003, which was produced by Rob Younger. The line-up was Cassidy, Neal, Simons and Graeme Trewin on drums. The Barman from I-94 Bar felt that "You get 11 tracks on Mirror... and there's not a clunker among them. The killer single 'That's How I'll Know' and another previously released cut, 'Complicator', have been re-recorded, and now boast a big beefy, bottom end."

In November 2005 they issued their self-titled EP on Universal Records with Cassidy and Neal joined by Saul Foster on drums. It was produced by David Eringa (Manic Street Preachers, Starsailor). Michelle Evans of FasterLouder noticed they were "Pounding out the Britpop the way it is meant to be played, the songs on this EP culminate the resonance of early '80s new-wave with modern day power pop." By December the trio were joined by Peter Farley (ex-Gelbison) on keyboards and Johnny Wilson (ex-Faker) on guitar. The Starky EP reached No. 13 on the ARIA Hitseekers Singles chart.

They performed at the third Come Together Festival at Luna Park, Sydney in June 2006. Neal told Kelsey Munro of The Sydney Morning Herald about their touring, "We're in the midst of an After the Fall tour, then we get a few days off and start doing the remainder of the Gerling tour. Yeah, we're busy, we haven't had much sleep in the last few days... This amazing rock'n'roll lifestyle."

Their second album was self-titled and appeared on 12 August 2006 via Universal Records with Starky as the four-piece of Cassidy on lead vocals, Foster, Neal and Wilson. Its lead single, "Hey Bang Bang", was released ahead of the album, and debuted at No. 42 on the ARIA Singles Chart. The track had been recorded in London and was initially meant for a B-side – however it became their first top 50 hit. It received considerable airplay on Triple J, and was nominated for the ARIA Award for Breakthrough Artist - Single at the ARIA Music Awards of 2006.

== Discography ==
=== Studio albums ===
List of studio albums, with selected details and chart positions
Title	Details	Peak chart positions
Title	Details	AUS
Mirror, Signal, Manoeuvre	Released: October 2003; Label: Laughing Outlaw (LORCD-066); Format: CD	—
Starky	Released: August 2006; Label: Universal (9877741); Format: CD, digital	80

=== Extended plays ===
List of extended plays, with selected details and chart positions
Title	Details	Peak chart positions
Title	Details	AUS Hitseekers
Starky	Released: November 2005; Label: Universal (9874689); Format: CD, digital	13

=== Singles ===
List of singles, with selected chart positions
Year	Title	Peak chart positions	Album
Year	Title	AUS	Album
1999	"Rock 'n' Roll Is the Devil's Music"	—	Non-album single
2002	"That's How I'll Know You"	—	Mirror, Signal, Manoeuvre
2003	"City Prison Doors"	—	Mirror, Signal, Manoeuvre
2004	"Saturday Night, Sunday Morning"	—	Mirror, Signal, Manoeuvre
2006	"Hey Bang Bang"	42	Starky
2006	"Is This How It Ends"	—	Starky

== Awards and nominations ==
=== ARIA Music Awards ===
The ARIA Music Awards is an annual awards ceremony that recognises excellence, innovation, and achievement across all genres of Australian music. They commenced in 1987.

Year	Nominee / work	Award	Result	Ref.
2006	"Hey Bang Bang"	Breakthrough Artist - Single	Nominated	
