= From a Window/This Morning =

Single by Northern Uproar

from the album Northern Uproar
- B-side: "Credibility" "My Minds Eye"
- Released: 25 January 1996
- Studio: Monnow Valley
- Genre: Rock; Britpop
- Label: Heavenly
- Songwriters: Leon Meya, Paul Kelly, Jeff Fletcher
- Producers: Dave Eringa, James Dean Bradfield

Northern Uproar singles chronology
"Rollercoaster/Rough Boys" (1995)	"From a Window/This Morning" (1996)	"Livin' It Up" (1996)

"From a Window/This Morning" is a double A-side single by the English rock band Northern Uproar, released in January 1996 as the second single from their debut album, Northern Uproar. It peaked at number 17 on the UK Singles Chart, becoming their highest-selling single. It also reached number 44 in Sweden. The single's second B-side, "My Minds Eye", is a cover of a Small Faces song.

== Track listing ==
UK CD single

1. "From a Window"
2. "Credibility"
3. "My Minds Eye"
4. "This Morning"

UK 7-inch vinyl, UK and Europe cassette

1. "From a Window"
2. "This Morning"

== Credits ==
Credits taken from the Northern Uproar booklet and CD single notes.

Northern Uproar

- Leon Meya – bass guitar, lead vocals, songwriter (tracks 1, 2, 4)
- Keith Chadwick – drums
- Paul Kelly – guitar, songwriter (tracks 2, 4)
- Jeff Fletcher – guitar, backing vocals, songwriter (tracks 1, 2)

Additional musicians

- James Dean Bradfield – backing vocals (track 1)
- Steve Marriott – songwriter (track 3)
- Ronnie Lane – songwriter (track 3)

Production

- Dave Eringa – producer, mixing, engineer (tracks 1, 3, 4)
- James Dean Bradfield – producer, mixing (tracks 1, 4)
- Northern Uproar – producer (track 2)
- Steve Droogan – engineer (track 2)
- James Fry – photography

== Charts ==
Chart (1996)	Peak position
UK Singles (OCC)	17
Sweden (Sverigetopplistan)	44
