= Not Enough Night =

Studio album by Kubichek!
- Released: March 19, 2007
- Recorded: 2006
- Genre: Indie rock
- Length: 39:39
- Label: 30:30 Recordings
- Producer: Dave Eringa

Professional ratings
Review scores
Source	Rating
Rockfeedback	link
Drowned in Sound	9/10 link
NME	8/10 link
IndieLondon	link
Crud Magazine	link
MusicOMH	link

Not Enough Night is the debut album by indie rock band Kubichek!. It was released in the UK on 19 March 2007. The title is taken from the chorus of the song Nightjoy.

== Track listing ==
1. "Searchers" - 0:22
2. "Roman Is Better" - 3:15
3. "Taxi" - 2:49
4. "Nightjoy" - 3:28
5. "Hope Is Impossible" - 4:53
6. "Stutter" - 3:21
7. "Method Acting" - 3:36
8. "Outwards" - 3:10
9. "Opening Shot" - 2:57
10. "Hometown Strategies" - 3:30
11. "Start As We Meant To" - 5:00
12. "Just Shut It Down" - 3:17
13. "A Dead End" - 3:31 (Japan-only bonus track)
