= Our Aim Is to Satisfy =

Studio album by Red Snapper
- Released: 9 October 2000
- Length: 56:54
- Label: Warp
- Producers: Red Snapper, Hugo Nicolson

Red Snapper chronology
Making Bones (1999)	Our Aim Is to Satisfy (2000)	Red Snapper (2003)

Professional ratings
Review scores
Source	Rating
AllMusic	4/5 stars
Pitchfork	7.6/10

Our Aim Is to Satisfy is a 2000 studio album by the band Red Snapper. It is listed in the book 1001 Albums You Must Hear Before You Die.

== Critical reception ==
The Guardian called Our Aim Is to Satisfy the band's best album to date, writing that they intersperse "moody, atmospheric instrumentals with funkier, soulful vocal tracks to make a collection that flows smoothly from beginning to end, a soundtrack for urban Britain that suggests a more revved-up Massive Attack."

== Track listing ==
All music is composed by Alistair "Ali" Friend, David Ayer and Richard Thair, with additional co-writers listed.

No.	Title	Music	Length
1.	"Keeping Pigs Together"		5:24
2.	"Some Kind of Kink"	Joseph Ellington, David Essex	5:26
3.	"Shellback"	Karime Kendra	5:44
4.	"Don't Go Nowhere"	Jake Williams	4:50
5.	"The Rake"	Ellington	5:14
6.	"The Rough and the Quick"	Kendra, Williams	5:06
7.	"Bussing"		5:24
8.	"I Stole Your Car"	Ellington	4:14
9.	"Alaska Street"		5:01
10.	"Belladonna"		4:27
11.	"They're Hanging Me Tonight"		6:07

== Personnel ==
Credits adapted from liner notes.

- David Ayers – guitar, keyboards
- Ali Friend – electric bass, double bass
- Richard Thair – drums, decks
- MC Det – vocals
- Karime Kendra – vocals
- Jake Williams – keyboards
- Darren Morris – keyboards
- Mike Kearsy – trombone

== Charts ==
Chart	Peak position
UK Albums (OCC)	78
