= Light Years (2015 film) =

- Directed by: Esther May Campbell
- Written by: Esther May Campbell
- Starring: Sophie Burton
- Cinematography: Zac Nicholson; Will Pugh
- Edited by: Chris Barwell
- Release date: 8 September 2015 (Venice Film Festival)
- Country: United Kingdom
- Language: English

Light Years is a 2015 British indie drama film written and directed by Esther May Campbell. It premiered in the International Critics' Week section at the 72nd edition of the Venice Film Festival.

== Cast ==
- Beth Orton as Moira
- Muhammet Uzuner as Dee
- Sophie Burton as Ramona
- James Stuckey as Ewan
- Mike Wright as Spirit
- Zamira Fuller as Rose
- Graeme Hogg as Roderick
- Mickey Morris as Levi
- Ewan Cooke as Nathan
