= Esther May Campbell =

Esther May Campbell (born 27 May 1972 in London) is a British filmmaker, director, photographer and writer. In 2008 she received a BAFTA Award for Best Short Film for her film September. Campbell's debut feature film Light Years premiered in the International Critics’ Week section at the 72nd edition of the Venice Film Festival.

== Career ==
A self-taught visual artist, Campbell's early work was directing low-fi music videos and short films. She directed several episodes of the BBC soap series Doctors and for Channel 4's Hollyoaks in 2006 and 2007. In 2008, she wrote and directed the short film September funded by the UKFC, which won the BAFTA award for short film, as well as many other international awards. In 2010, Campbell directed Channel 4 drama Skins and in 2012, she went on to direct a feature-length episode of BBC1's Wallander starring Kenneth Branagh. In 2015, her first feature film Light Years, starring Beth Orton and Muhammet Uzuner, premiered at Venice Critics Week.

Besides her work in TV and cinema, Campbell is a prolific stills photographer. Throughout the years Campbell continued to make music videos and record sleeves for artists such as Nancy Elizabeth, Kath Bloom, Joe Volk and James Blackshaw. She is also involved in a project for displaced children, born of the Cube Cinema in Bristol .
