= Town (song) =

Single by Northern Uproar

from the album Northern Uproar
- B-side: "Memories" "Kicks" (acoustic version) "I Am The Cosmos" (alternative mix)
- Released: 10 June 1996
- Studio: Monnow Valley; Suite 16 Studio; Battery
- Genre: Rock; Britpop
- Length: 4:40
- Label: Heavenly
- Songwriters: Leon Meya; Paul Kelly
- Producers: James Dean Bradfield; Dave Eringa

Northern Uproar singles chronology
"Livin' It Up" (1996)	"Town" (1996)	"Any Way You Look" (1997)

Music video
- "Town" on YouTube

"Town" is a song by the English rock band Northern Uproar, released on 10 June 1996 by Heavenly Recordings as the fourth single from their 1996 debut album Northern Uproar. It peaked at number 48 on the UK Singles Chart. One of the single's B-sides, "I Am The Cosmos", is a cover of the title track from the American musician Chris Bell's 1992 only solo album, I Am the Cosmos.

== Background ==
"Town" was written by Leon Meya and Paul Kelly as one of their earliest songs when they were both 16.

== Track listings ==
UK CD single

1. "Town" – 4:40
2. "Memories" – 3:11
3. "Kicks" (acoustic version) – 2:12
4. "I Am The Cosmos" (alternative mix) – 3:20

UK 7-inch vinyl

1. "Town" - 4:40
2. "Kicks" (acoustic version) - 2:12

== Credits and personnel ==
Credits taken from the Northern Uproar album booklet and CD single notes.

Northern Uproar

- Leon Meya – bass guitar, lead vocals, songwriter (tracks 1-3)
- Keith Chadwick – drums, piano (track 1)
- Paul Kelly – guitar, songwriter (tracks 1-3)
- Jeff Fletcher – guitar, backing vocals, songwriter (track 2)

Additional musicians

- James Dean Bradfield – backing vocals (tracks 1-2)
- Martin Green – string arranger (track 1)
- Chris Bell – songwriter (track 4)

Production

- Dave Eringa – producer, mixing (tracks 1-4)
- James Dean Bradfield – producer (tracks 1-2)
- Rex Sargeant – engineer (track 3)
- James Fry – photography

== Charts ==
Chart (1996)	Peak position
UK Singles (Official Charts)	48
