= The Rockingbirds =

British country rock band, formed in London in 1990

- Origin: London
- Genres: Country rock
- Years active: 1990–1995, 2008–present
- Labels: Heavenly, Cooking Vinyl, Loose
- Members: Alan Tyler; Sean Read; Andy Hackett; Patrick Arbuthnot; Dave Morgan; Marc Duncan
- Past members: Dave Goulding; Tim Kent; Chris Clarke; Trevor Smith

The Rockingbirds are a British country rock band, formed in London in 1990. They disbanded in 1995, but reformed in 2008 for the Heavenly Records 18th-anniversary shows. They began to tour again in spring 2009 and played the 2009 Glastonbury festival.

== History ==
=== 1990–1995 ===
The band's original line-up featured songwriter Alan Tyler (lead vocals and acoustic guitar), Sean Read (backing vocals and tambourine), Andrew Hackett (electric guitar), Patrick Arbuthnot (pedal steel guitar), and Dave Goulding (AKA Greenwood) (bass) and drummer Dave Morgan, both formerly of Weather Prophets. Their first single release on Heavenly Records was 1991's "A Good Day For You Is A Good Day For Me", followed by a tribute song to Jonathan Richman entitled "Jonathan, Jonathan" in 1992. That same year also saw the release of their eponymous debut album (produced by Clive Langer and Alan Winstanley), which included the "Gradually Learning" single. This gained some radio play and Heavenly (backed by a Sony distribution deal) produced a video filmed in Austin, Texas, US.

In November 1992, Heavenly released The Fred EP, which featured The Rockingbirds' cover of "Deeply Dippy", which provided the group with their only chart hit and their only Top Of The Pops appearance.

1993 saw Heavenly release a four-track EP, Rockingbirds-R-Us, featuring brand-new songs. The band's new line-up featured Tim Kent on banjo, Chris Clarke replacing Goulding on bass, and new drummer Trevor Smith. Their second album, Whatever Happened to the Rockingbirds?, was released in 1995 via Cooking Vinyl and featured production from Edwyn Collins. This was preceded by a single "Band Of Dreams" – released on 7" vinyl only – but the band split a few months later in November 1995, with a farewell gig at The Garage in North London.

Alan Tyler has continued to record and play live both as a solo performer and with his new band Alan Tyler and the Lost Sons of Littlefield. The new band includes Rockingbirds bass player Chris Clarke and occasionally Sean Read.

=== The Return of the Rockingbirds ===
After reforming for a Heavenly Records 18th-anniversary show at London's Royal Festival Hall in 2008 The Rockingbirds played a series of gigs in April 2009 to support a two-disc re-issue of the first album. This remastered version now features tracks from the Rockingbirds-R-Us EP as well as B-sides and live tracks culled from the single releases. A 500-run limited-edition 7" single of new Rockingbirds material was released on 6 April 2009, featuring the tracks "Man In The Moon" / "Lookingback Lullaby". In 2013 they released their first new album in 18 years, The Return of the Rockingbirds, on Loose Music. The album received favourable reviews from the British music press. The band toured the UK a bit in support of the album.

== Discography ==
=== Albums ===
- The Rockingbirds (1992, Heavenly)
- Whatever Happened to the Rockingbirds? (1995, Cooking Vinyl)
- The Return of the Rockingbirds (2013, Loose)
- More Rockingbirds (2019, Hanky Panky)

=== Singles and EPs ===
- "A Good Day for You Is a Good Day for Me" (1991, Heavenly)
- "Jonathan, Jonathan" (1992, Heavenly) - UK No. 85
- "Gradually Learning" (1992, Heavenly) - UK No. 81
- Rockingbirds-R-Us EP (1993, Heavenly)
- "Band of Dreams" (1995, Cooking Vinyl)
- "Man in the Moon / Lookingback Lullaby" (2009, Heavenly)

=== Guest appearances ===
- The Fred EP (1992, Heavenly) – UK Singles Chart No. 26
