= Rollercoaster/Rough Boy =

Single by Northern Uproar

from the album Northern Uproar
- Released: 5 October 1995

Northern Uproar singles chronology
"Rollercoaster/Rough Boy" (1995)	"From a Window/This Morning" (1996)

"Rollercoaster"/"Rough Boy" is the debut single from self-titled debut album by the English band Northern Uproar. It reached number 41 on the UK Singles Chart in 1995.

== Track listing ==
1. "Rollercoaster"
2. "Smooth Geezer"
3. "Rough Boy"
4. "Waiting On"
