= Central Reservation (song) =

Single by Beth Orton

from the album Central Reservation
- Released: 13 September 1999
- Genre: Folktronica
- Length: 3:57
- Label: Heavenly (UK) - HVN 92; Deconstruction (US)
- Songwriter(s): Beth Orton
- Producer(s): Ben Watt

Beth Orton singles chronology
"'Stolen Car'" (1999)	"Central Reservation" (1999)	"'Concrete Sky'" (2002)

"Central Reservation" is a song by Beth Orton, released as a single in 1999. It was released as the second single from the album of the same title, using the "Then Again version" of the song instead of the original acoustic version. It peaked at #37 in the UK Singles Chart.

A video to promote the single was filmed in New York City, produced by Sophie Muller.

== Track listing ==
CD1
Heavenly / HVN 92CD1

1. "Central Reservation" (The Then Again Version) – 3:57
2. "Central Reservation" (Spiritual Life / Ibadan Remix) – 8:50
3. "Central Reservation" (William Orbit Remix) – 4:41

CD2
Heavenly / HVN 92CD2

1. "Central Reservation" (Deep Dish Modern Red Neck Remix - Edit) – 3:59
2. "Central Reservation" (Deep Dish Modern Red Neck Remix) – 8:07
3. "Central Reservation" (Deep Dish Modern Red Neck 2000 Dub) – 7:47

12"
Heavenly / HVN 9212

1. "Central Reservation" (Spiritual Life / Ibadan Remix) – 7:55
2. "Central Reservation" (Deep Dish Modern Red Neck 2000 Dub) – 8:04
