= Northern Uproar =

English band

- Origin: Stockport, Greater Manchester England
- Genres: Alternative rock; Britpop
- Years active: 1995–1999, 2004, 2006–present
- Labels: Heavenly; Tiny Rebel
- Members: Leon Meya; Chris Gorman; Alex Stubbs
- Past members: Keith Chadwick; Jeff Fletcher.; Nick Harty; Paul Kelly; Noel Meya
- Website: northernuproar.net

Northern Uproar are an English rock band formed in Stockport, Greater Manchester in 1995. They disbanded in 1999, reuniting in 2006, recording another two studio albums and one live album. They have released four studio albums and seven singles. Their biggest-selling single was double A-side "From a Window/This Morning", which peaked in the UK's Top 40 at 17 in February 1996.

== History ==
=== Beginning and debut album (1995–96) ===
The band formed in 1995 with Leon Meya (vocalist, bassist), Paul Kelly (guitarist), Jeff Fletcher (guitarist), and Keith Chadwick (drummer). Still in their teens and without a recording contract, the band drew praise from the music magazines NME and Melody Maker, following several energetic live performances at the Roadhouse in Manchester.

After a bidding war, the group eventually signed with Heavenly Records and in Monnow Valley Studio in Monmouth they recorded songs with Manic Street Preachers' James Dean Bradfield as producer and Dave Eringa as co-producer.

The band released their first single, "Rollercoaster", in late 1995 and appeared on Granada TV. The track peaked at #41 in the UK Singles Chart. The group's next single, "From a Window", peaked at number 17. During this period of initial success the band made the cover of Melody Maker, and also appeared on the BBC TV programme Top of the Pops. At around the same time, Meya was featured in tabloid newspapers due to a rumoured relationship with the 1980s pop singer Sinitta.

In April 1996, Northern Uproar's self-titled debut album was released and the group toured the United Kingdom and Japan.

=== Second album and break-up (1997–99) ===
In 1997, they began recording their second full-length album, Yesterday Tomorrow Today, featuring songs co-written with the band's guitar technician, Nigel Banks. This album was not as commercially successful as their debut effort, reaching number 95 on the UK Albums Chart; although it was well received by the UK music press.

In late 1997 the band issued a fittingly entitled final single, "Goodbye", before parting company with Heavenly Records. The band toured Japan for a second time and recorded demos for a third album. These remained unreleased however as the band split up in 1999.

=== Returning to touring, reformation and Stand and Fight (2004, 2006–07) ===
In 2004, Meya and lead guitarist Fletcher returned to the live circuit under the Northern Uproar name, with two shows in the Manchester area, performing both new and old songs. A reunion was mooted but nothing emerged in 2005. However, the band officially reformed in 2006 with Meya, Fletcher and Meya's cousin Noel on drums. A new album, Stand and Fight, was released in July 2007 on the independent record label Tiny Rebel, preceded by an album launch gig on 14 March at the Manchester Academy. A full UK tour followed. In October 2007 the band supported The Coral at the Oxford Carling Academy. They were invited after Meya met their frontman, James Skelly, on Channel 4's Transmission show. In addition to this, the band performed at a number of festivals in southern Spain. A video including footage of these shows was released for the song 'Nothin' you can do'.

=== Festivals and other shows, All That Was Has Gone and Hey Samurai! (2011–present) ===
On 27 May 2011, Northern Uproar headlined the 'This Feeling' Britpop night at The Vibe Bar London, tickets for the event sold out after it was featured in The Sun newspaper and the NME. Leon Meya appeared on the Steve Harris show on XFM on 26 May 2011 and spoke of the time he had spent living in Barcelona writing a new album and of the band's plans to release new material though the SoundCloud website, as well as the possibility of more live shows in the summer.

On 30 June 2011, Northern Uproar performed at the AAA Shaun Ryder and friends Exhibition by Albinsson. The band were featured in the exhibition alongside Shaun Ryder, Noel Gallagher, David Bowie, Howard Marks and others. On 8 July 2011, Northern Uproar played to a sold out Sound Control, Manchester as special guests of Rochdale-based band Proud Mary.

In September 2011, Leon Meya gave an interview to music blog Mr Scott:Music, where he gave an update about the recording of the new album, saying "The aim is to deliver an amazing album to the people who want it. We get asked at every gig when there's gonna be new stuff... so it's for those people!"

On 29 June 2013, Northern Uproar released their fourth album, All That Was Has Gone, which was funded via Pledgemusic, as well as announcing more live shows. Guitarist Jeff Fletcher left the band in 2013. On 17 November 2014, Fletcher was hit and killed by a lorry in Stockport.

The band released their fifth album, Hey Samurai!, on 9 October 2015.

In 2018, the band returned to play three dates of the Star Shaped Festival tour.

In April 2021 the band appeared briefly on an episode of BBC show, Dragons' Den.

== Members ==
Current members

- Leon Meya – vocals, bass (1995–1999, 2004, 2006–present)
- Alex Stubbs – drums (2007–present)
- Chris Gorman – guitars (2007–present)

Former members

- Jeff Fletcher – guitars (1995–1999, 2004, 2006–2013; died 2014)
- Paul Kelly – guitars (1995–1999)
- Keith Chadwick – drums (1995–1999)
- Noel Meya – drums (2006–2007)
- Nick Harty – drums (2007)

== Discography ==
Studio albums

- Northern Uproar (1996) – #22 UK
- Yesterday Tomorrow Today (1997) – #95 UK
- Stand and Fight (2007)
- All That Was Has Gone (2013)
- Hey Samurai! (2015)

Compilation albums

- Singles (2014)

Singles

- "Rollercoaster/Rough Boy" (5 October 1995) – #41 UK
- "From a Window/This Morning" (25 January 1996) – #17 UK
- "Livin' It Up" (1 April 1996) – #24 UK
- "Town" (1 June 1996) – #48 UK
- "Any Way You Look" (1 May 1997) – #36 UK
- "A Girl I Once Knew" (1 August 1997) – #63 UK
- "Goodbye" (20 October 1997) – #87 UK
