= Sugaring Season =

Studio album by Beth Orton
- Released: 1 October 2012
- Recorded: Flora Recording & Playback, Portland, Oregon, US
- Genre: Folk
- Length: 37:25
- Label: Anti-
- Producer: Tucker Martine

Beth Orton chronology
Comfort of Strangers (2006)	Sugaring Season (2012)	Kidsticks (2016)

Singles from Sugaring Season
- 1. "Something More Beautiful" Released: 10 July 2012; 2. "Magpie" Released: 28 August 2012; 3. "Call Me the Breeze" Released: 11 September 2012

Sugaring Season is the sixth studio album by English singer-songwriter Beth Orton. It was her first new album in six years and was recorded in Portland, Oregon at the studio of producer Tucker Martine. It is her first release for the Anti- record label with whom she signed in 2010. In 2014 it was awarded a silver certification from the Independent Music Companies Association, which indicated sales of at least 20,000 copies throughout Europe.

== Critical reviews ==
Professional ratings
Aggregate scores
Source	Rating
Metacritic	75/100
Review scores
Source	Rating
AllMusic	4/5 stars
The A.V. Club	C+
Drowned in Sound	7/10
Paste	8.5/10
Pitchfork	7.7
Rolling Stone	3/5 stars
Slant Magazine	3.5/5 stars
This Is Fake DIY	8/10

Review aggregation website Metacritic assigned Sugaring Season a score of 76 based on twenty-eight reviews, denoting "generally favorable reviews". Thom Jurek of AllMusic called it "sophisticated, mature, and rife with quiet passion", and said "its songs are informed by the struggles inherent in everyday life, but also account for dreams, small triumphs, and the redemptive power of love".

== Track listing ==
All songs were composed by Beth Orton except where noted:

1. "Magpie" – 4:32
2. "Dawn Chorus" – 3:24
3. "Candles" – 3:45
4. "Something More Beautiful" (Orton, M. Ward) – 3:28
5. "Call Me the Breeze" (Orton, Tom Rowlands) – 3:52
6. "Poison Tree" (lyrics partially by William Blake) – 4:06
7. "See Through Blue" (Orton, Clemence Des Rochers, Pierre Brault) – 1:54
8. "Last Leaves of Autumn" – 4:01
9. "State of Grace" – 4:15
10. "Mystery" – 4:08

Deluxe Edition bonus tracks

11. "That Summer Feeling" (Jonathan Richman) – 4:37
12. "I Wasn't Born to Follow" (Byrds) – 3:59
13. "Goin' Back" (Neil Young) – 4:02

== Personnel ==
- Beth Orton – vocals, guitar
- Rob Burger – piano, harmonium, electric piano, accordion
- Brian Blade – drums, percussions
- Clarice Jensen – cello
- Ted Barnes – guitar, banjo
- Marc Ribot – guitar
- Carl Broemel – guitar
- Sam Amidon – guitar, organ, violin, backing vocals
- Eyvind Kang – viola
- Nadia Sirota – viola
- Ben Russell – violin
- Tucker Martine – percussions
- Sebastian Steinberg – bass
- Nate Query – bass
- Laura Veirs – backing vocals

== Charts ==
Chart performance for Sugaring Season
Chart (2012)	Peak position
UK Albums (Official Charts)	26
US Billboard 200	90
