= Trailer Park (album) =

Studio album by Beth Orton
- Released: 19 October 1996
- Studio: Wessex · Maison Rouge · Matrix
- Genres: Folktronica; trip hop
- Length: 59:33
- Labels: Heavenly (UK) - HVNLP 17; Dedicated (US)
- Producers: Victor Van Vugt, Andrew Weatherall

Beth Orton chronology
Superpinkymandy (1993)	Trailer Park (1996)	Best Bit (1997)

Trailer Park is the second studio album by British singer Beth Orton. Combining folk, electronica, and trip hop elements, it earned Orton two BRIT Award nominations. One single from the album was the opening track, "She Cries Your Name", which previously appeared in a different form on William Orbit's album Strange Cargo Hinterland. All songs were co-written by Orton except for a cover version of Phil Spector's "I Wish I Never Saw the Sunshine." The album was among the first to fuse elements of 1960s and 1970s folk with modern electronica and trip hop.

An expanded two-disc Legacy Edition was released internationally on 10 March 2009.

== Critical reception ==
Professional ratings
Review scores
Source	Rating
AllMusic	4.5/5 stars
Chicago Tribune	3.5/4 stars
Entertainment Weekly	A−
The Guardian	4/5 stars
Mojo	4/5 stars
Pitchfork	8.0/10
Q	4/5 stars
Rolling Stone	3.5/5 stars
The Rolling Stone Album Guide	4.5/5 stars
Spin	7/10

Chris Jones of BBC Music called Trailer Park "a very English record" and wrote that "only on the poppier 'Don't Need a Reason' or 'Someone's Daughter' does she go badly wrong."

== Track listing ==
All tracks written by Ted Barnes, Ali Friend, and Beth Orton except where noted.

No.	Title	Writer(s)	Length
1.	"She Cries Your Name"	William Orbit; Orton	4:47
2.	"Tangent"		7:29
3.	"Don't Need a Reason"	Barnes; Orton	5:04
4.	"Live as You Dream"		2:59
5.	"Sugar Boy"		4:21
6.	"Touch Me with Your Love"		7:27
7.	"Whenever"		3:53
8.	"How Far"		4:27
9.	"Someone's Daughter"		4:16
10.	"I Wish I Never Saw the Sunshine"	Jeff Barry; Ellie Greenwich; Phil Spector	4:43
11.	"Galaxy of Emptiness"		10:07

2009 Legacy Edition disc two
No.	Title	Length
1.	"Safety"	2:10
2.	"It's Not the Spotlight"	4:17
3.	"Galaxy of Emptiness" (Live at Shepherds Bush Empire, 26 November 1996)	5:49
4.	"Pedestal"	4:55
5.	"Touch Me with Your Love" (Instrumental)	6:35
6.	"It's This I Am I Find"	3:48
7.	"Bullet"	4:36
8.	"Best Bit" (Early Version)	3:04
9.	"Best Bit"	4:15
10.	"Skimming Stone"	5:48
11.	"Dolphins" (featuring Terry Callier)	4:16
12.	"Lean on Me" (featuring Terry Callier)	5:06
13.	"I Love How You Love Me"	2:36

== Charts ==
Chart performance for Trailer Park
Chart (1996–1997)	Peak position
Australian Albums (ARIA)	84
UK Albums (Official Charts)	68

== Certifications and sales ==
Certifications and sales for Trailer Park
Region	Certification	Certified units/sales
United Kingdom (BPI)	Platinum	300,000^{‡}
United States	—	92,000
^{‡} Sales+streaming figures based on certification alone.
