= Northern Uproar (album) =

Studio album by Northern Uproar
- Released: 29 April 1996
- Recorded: 1995–1996
- Studio: Monnow Valley
- Genre: Rock, Britpop
- Length: 43:52
- Label: Heavenly
- Producer: Dave Eringa, James Dean Bradfield

Northern Uproar chronology
Northern Uproar (1996)	Yesterday Tomorrow Today (1997)

Singles from Northern Uproar
- 1. "Rollercoaster/Rough Boy" Released: 5 October 1995; 2. "From a Window/This Morning" Released: 25 January 1996; 3. "Livin' It Up" Released: 1 April 1996; 4. "Town" Released: 1 June 1996

Northern Uproar is the debut studio album by the English rock band Northern Uproar, released on 29 April 1996 by Heavenly Recordings, peaking at number twenty-two on the UK Albums Chart. Its singles were "Rollercoaster/Rough Boy", "From a Window/This Morning", "Livin' It Up" and "Town". Its release followed a tour of the UK and Japan.

In February 2022, the LP was reissued on 140g clear vinyl through Demon Records.

== Production ==
After praise following their formation in 1995 from music magazines NME and Melody Maker after live performances at the Roundhouse in Manchester, the band, still in their teens, signed to Heavenly after a bidding war.

The record was recorded at Monnow Valley Studio from 1995 to 1996 and was entirely mixed and produced by Dave Eringa and co-produced by Manic Street Preachers frontman James Dean Bradfield for tracks 1, 2, 3, 6 and 11. As well as this, he performed backing vocals for the first eight tracks and the last two. The lead singer, Leon Meya, also performed backing vocals for tracks 5, 7 and 8. Eringa also played piano for tracks 7 and 12. Additionally, Keith Chadwick played piano for track 3 and Hammond organ for track 10. The strings for track 3 were arranged by Martin Green.

== Reception ==
Professional ratings
Review scores
Source	Rating
AllMusic	3/5 stars

AllMusic gave the album a rating of 3 out of 5. The Manc Review wrote in 2012 that From a Window "exudes pure attitude, without the overbearing arrogance of his Manchester peers and showcases the customised dual vocals of the band." They also praised "Town", noting that "you hear the sombre and shimmery riffs are picked up by the sweeping violins edging towards a new wave baroque."

== Track listing ==
No.	Title	Writer(s)	Length
1.	"From a Window"	Leon Meya, Jeff Fletcher	3:15
2.	"Rough Boy"	Meya, Paul Kelly, Fletcher	3:41
3.	"Town"	Meya, Kelly	4:40
4.	"Kicks"	Meya, Kelly	3:09
5.	"Breakthrough"	Meya	3:16
6.	"Memories"	Meya, Kelly, Fletcher	3:11
7.	"Waiting On"	Meya, Kelly	3:25
8.	"Livin' It Up"	Meya, Kelly	2:51
9.	"Head Under Water"	Meya, Kelly	4:20
10.	"Moods"	Meya, Kelly	3:33
11.	"Rollercoaster"	Meya	3:44
12.	"Living in the Red"	Kelly, Meya	4:40
Total length:			43:52

== Personnel ==
Personnel per booklet.

Northern Uproar

- Leon Meya – bass guitar, lead vocals; backing vocals (tracks 5, 7, 8 and 12)
- Keith Chadwick – drums; piano (track 3); Hammond organ (track 10)
- Paul Kelly – guitar
- Jeff Fletcher – guitar, backing vocals

Additional musicians

- James Dean Bradfield – backing vocals (tracks 1–8, 11 and 12)
- Martin Green – string arranger (track 3)
- Dave Eringa – piano (tracks 7 and 12)

Production

- Dave Eringa – producer; mixing
- James Dean Bradfield – producer (tracks 1–3, 6 and 11)
- Hamish Brown – photography
- Karin Albinsson – photography
- Brian Sweeney – photography
- James Fry – photography
- Negativespace – design

== Charts ==
Chart (1996)	Peak position
Swedish Albums (Sverigetopplistan)	55
UK Albums (Official Charts)	22
