= Thinking About Tomorrow =

Single by Beth Orton
- Released: 31 March 2003
- Genre: Folk
- Length: 3:32 (Radio Mix)
- Label: Heavenly Records – HVN 129
- Songwriters: Ted Brett Barnes, Sebastian Steinberg, Beth Orton & Sean Read
- Producer: Victor Van Vugt

"Thinking About Tomorrow" was a 2003 single by English songwriter Beth Orton. It was released on CD, and peaked at #57 in the UK charts. The song appears on the album Daybreaker and Pass in Time: The Definitive Collection. The song was also featured in the pilot episode of the ABC show The Nine, on the soundtrack of the movie How to Deal (2003), and on an episode of Charmed.

== Track listing ==
=== CD: Heavenly / HVN 129CD United Kingdom ===
1. "Thinking About Tomorrow (Ben Watt Radio Mix)" – 3:32
2. "Daybreaker (Roots Manuva mix)" – 4:36
3. "Daybreaker (Four Tet mix)" – 5:07
