= Kidsticks =

2016 album by Beth Orton

Studio album by Beth Orton
- Released: 25 May 2016
- Genre: Electronic
- Length: 37:30
- Label: Anti-
- Producers: Beth Orton; Andrew Hung

Beth Orton chronology
Sugaring Season (2012)	Kidsticks (2016)	Weather Alive (2022)

Professional ratings
Aggregate scores
Source	Rating
Metacritic	72/100
Review scores
Source	Rating
AllMusic	4/5 stars
Drowned in Sound	7/10
Paste	9/10
Pitchfork	7.6/10
PopMatters	8/10
Slant Magazine	6/10

Kidsticks is the seventh studio album by English singer-songwriter Beth Orton. The album was produced by Orton alongside Andrew Hung from the band Fuck Buttons, who provided drum and synth programming. The album includes contributions from Chris Taylor of Grizzly Bear, George Lewis Jr from Twin Shadow, and composer Dustin O’Halloran. Kidsticks was released on 27 May 2016, following extensive airplay of the singles "Moon" and "1973" on BBC 6Music and elsewhere.

== Release and promotion ==
Orton was criticised over her music video for the song "1973" in which she is shown spray painting a federally protected Joshua tree and other desert plant life. After an outcry from the local community, which included a petition on Change.org, the music video was removed online. Orton publicly apologised and the Mojave Desert Trust responded positively to her outreach, stating, "We appreciate that Beth Orton regrets her prior actions, and that she intends to educate others about the natural beauty of the Mojave Desert, and the responsibility we collectively share for protecting this unique environment from vandalism and harm."

== Critical reception ==
The Guardian wrote that "Kidsticks is a real reinvention: not so much a return to her electronic roots as a bold exploration of fresh territory." Philip Sherburne, writing for Pitchfork, suggested that "a picture emerges of Orton that's anxious, playful, and even supremely relatable. There are love songs here, and falling-out-of-love songs, and sometimes it takes a while to tell which is which." Writing for The New York Times, Ben Ratliff noted that, Orton and collaborator Andrew Hung "created a sound for the record that seems to be made in the image of her voice's middle range. Which is to say, a bit weary, a bit monochromatic."

== Track listing ==
All tracks are written by Beth Orton and Andrew Hung.

Kidsticks track listing
No.	Title	Length
1.	"Snow"	4:12
2.	"Moon"	4:02
3.	"Petals"	3:58
4.	"1973"	2:53
5.	"Wave"	3:16
6.	"Dawnstar"	4:47
7.	"Falling"	4:22
8.	"Corduroy Legs"	3:01
9.	"Flesh and Blood"	5:43
10.	"Kidsticks"	1:16
Total length:		37:30

== Charts ==
Chart performance for Kidsticks
Chart (2017)	Peak position
Australian Albums (ARIA)	47
Belgian Albums (Ultratop Flanders)	147
UK Albums (Official Charts)	40
