= The Ground Above =

Studio album by Beth Orton
- Released: 26 June 2026
- Length: 47:22
- Label: Partisan
- Producer: Beth Orton

Beth Orton chronology
Weather Alive (2022)	The Ground Above (2026)

The Ground Above is the ninth studio album by English singer-songwriter Beth Orton. The album was released on 26 June 2026 by Partisan Records.

== Critical reception ==
Professional ratings
Aggregate scores
Source	Rating
AnyDecentMusic?	7.8/10
Metacritic	83/100
Review scores
Source	Rating
Clash	9/10
Mojo	4/5 stars
MusicOMH	4.5/5 stars
Northern Transmissions	7.3/10
Paste	B+
Slant	4/5 stars
Spectrum Culture	70%
Uncut	4/5 stars

According to the review aggregator Metacritic, The Ground Above received "universal acclaim" based on a weighted average score of 83 out of 100 from ten critic scores. The review aggregator Any Decent Music gave the album a weighted average score of 7.8 out of 10 from twelve critic scores.

== Track listing ==
All tracks are written by Beth Orton except where noted.

The Ground Above track listing
No.	Title	Writer(s)	Length
1.	"The Ground Above"		8:33
2.	"Before I Knew"	Orton; Oliver Kraus	6:22
3.	"Cigarette Curls"		6:42
4.	"Waiting"		4:38
5.	"Celestial Light"		5:23
6.	"I'll Miss You"		5:48
7.	"Love You Right"		5:05
8.	"Otherside"		4:50
Total length:			47:22

== Personnel ==
These credits have been adapted from Tidal.

- Beth Orton – production, vocals (all tracks); Rhodes piano (tracks 1 and 7); Wurlitzer (track 3); piano (tracks 4 and 8); background vocals (track 8)
- Shahzad Ismaily – bass (tracks 1, 4, 5, and 8); acoustic guitar (track 3); organ (track 4); synthesiser (tracks 5 and 6); flute, nylon-string guitar, percussion (track 6)
- Vishal Nayak – drums, recording (tracks 1 and 5)
- Dave Okumu – electric guitar (tracks 1, 4, and 6–8)
- Grey McMurray – electric guitar (tracks 1, 3, 5, and 6); background vocals (tracks 4 and 6)
- Sam Beste – piano (tracks 1–5, 7, and 8); synthesiser (tracks 3, 5, and 7)
- Christos Stylianides – trumpet (tracks 1, 2, and 4)
- Greg Calbi – mastering (all tracks)
- Steve Fallone – mastering (all tracks)
- Craig Silvey – mixing (all tracks)
- Tom Herbert – double bass (track 2); bass (tracks 3, 4, 6, and 7)
- Chris Vatalaro – drums (tracks 2–4, 7, and 8)
- Adrian Utley – electric guitar (tracks 2–4); acoustic guitar (track 7)
- Sam Amidon – fiddle (track 2)
- Cameron Craig – recording (tracks 2–4, 7, and 8)
- Mauro Refosco – congas (track 3); marimba (track 5)
- Leo Abrahams – electric guitar (track 3)
- Paul Butler – orchestration (tracks 3, 7, and 8)
- Nick Hakim – vocals (track 3)
- Teeny Lieberson – background vocals (tracks 4, 7, and 8)
- Jesse Chandler – flute (tracks 4, 5), organ (track 4)
- Ben Sloan – drums (track 5)
- Tom Skinner – drums (track 6)
- Mikko Gordon – recording (track 6)

== Charts ==
Chart performance for The Ground Above
Chart (2026)	Peak position
French Physical Albums (SNEP)	192
French Rock & Metal Albums (SNEP)	40
Scottish Albums (Official Charts)	12
UK Albums (Official Charts)	85
UK Independent Albums (Official Charts)	1
