= Red Snapper (band) =

British instrumental band

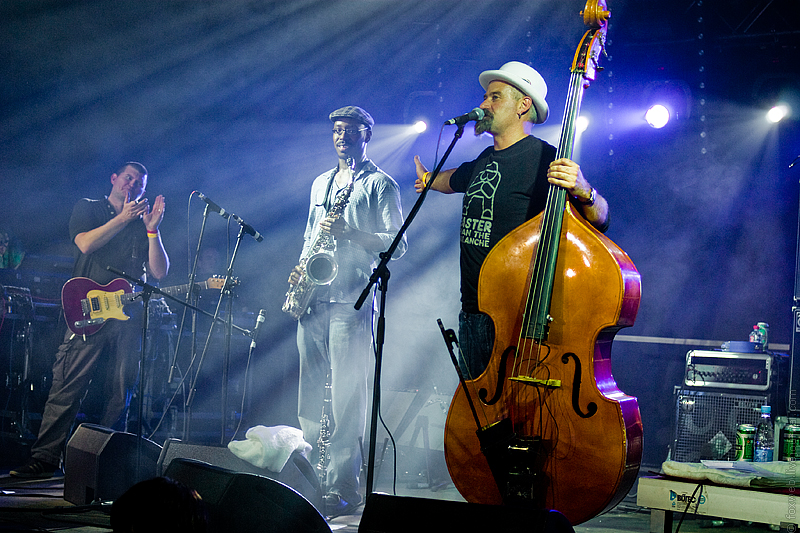
- Red Snapper at Milk Club, Moscow, 2009

Background information
- Origin: London, England
- Genres: Nu jazz, acid jazz, trip hop
- Years active: 1993–2002, 2007–present
- Labels: Warp Records; Lo Recordings
- Members: Ali Friend; Richard Thair; David Ayers; Tom Challenger
- Website: Official website

Red Snapper are a British instrumental band founded in London in 1993 by Ali Friend (double bass), Richard Thair (drums), and David Ayers (guitar). The three core members are also joined by various guest musicians and vocalists on different records. Since the 2007 reunion Tom Challenger (saxophone) has also been a member of the band. According to music journalist Jason Ankeny of AllMusic, "the British acid jazz trio [are] notable for their pioneering synthesis of acoustic instruments and electronic textures".

== Career ==
The band released three EPs on Flaw Recordings before signing to Warp Records for their debut album, Prince Blimey (1996). The band were a somewhat unusual feature of Warp Records' 1990s roster: in contrast to the studio-oriented IDM the record label primarily dealt in, the band had a live and organic sound: a smoky mixture of dub, jazz and all tempos of breakbeat from trip hop to drum and bass. In 1997, Red Snapper (along with the Foo Fighters) supported the Prodigy on their Fat of the Land tour in the UK.

For their follow-up Making Bones they were joined by jungle MC Det, trumpeter Byron Wallen and singer Alison David. The latter was replaced by Karim Kendra by their third album, Our Aim Is to Satisfy (2000).

In early 2002, Red Snapper announced their dissolution. In interviews since the reunion the band said a reason for splitting was too much discussing what to play, rather than playing. Each member wanted to try a different musical direction.

Also in 2002, the various artists compilation album It's All Good was released. It included a previously unreleased track, "Ultraviolet", which was also included on Red Snapper, a compilation of unreleased and rare Red Snapper tracks released by Lo Recordings in 2003.

Later in 2003, an album of remixes was released, Redone, which included tracks remixed by the Snapper themselves. Ayers and Felix Tod were credited as The Creation, Thair remixed "Ultraviolet", and the "Odd Man Out" (Odd Man remix) was done by Friend, Gavin Clark and Ted Barnes. The last track included vocals. Later the Flameboy Records (owned by Jake Williams, former RS keyboard player) released a four-track vinyl called "RedOne", which included three tracks from Redone and a previously unreleased Red Snapper track entitled "Drill", featuring MC Det.

=== Reunion ===
Red Snapper reformed in 2007 – this was posted on their MySpace page:

After 6 years apart concentrating on different projects, Red Snapper return. Ali has been working with Beth Orton and his new band Clayhill. David has been focusing on writing music for TV with his work featuring on the highly acclaimed BBC show 'The Tribe'. Rich has been working with Jakeone on their band Toob, with Rennie Pilgrem and the TCR Allstars and Bomb the Bass.

In late 2007, the band decided to rejoin after a jam session. They returned to the recording studio to work on new material for their sixth album. Saxophonist Tom Challenger played at the sessions and became a member of the band.

Red Snapper appeared at the Bloc Weekend in March 2008. The band released Pale Blue Dot (Lo Recordings) on 2 October 2008.

They appeared on the Glade Stage at Glastonbury 2009.

In May 2011 the band released Key, their seventh album on V2 Benelux with band members Rich Thair (drums), Ali Friend (double bass/vocals) and David Ayers (guitar) – this time, they are joined by jazz saxophonist Tom Challenger and guest vocalists Gavin Clarke (UNKLE, Clayhill) and Mercury Prize nominee Eliza Carthy. The band followed up the album with an extensive tour of Europe throughout the summer of 2011.

On 1 September 2014, Red Snapper released the album Hyena on Lo Recordings. It features music inspired by a soundtrack that the group composed to accompany the film Touki Bouki.

In 2016, the band toured Belarus and played at the Canary Wharf Jazz Festival.

=== NUMBER ===
In 2019, Friend and Thair formed Number (stylised as NUMBER), a post-punk/disco-funk band also featuring vocals by Dan Carney, Heloise Gerstein and Luisa Tunstall-Behrens. Their debut single "Face Down in Ecstasy" was released in April 2019 with their album BINARY released a year later by Sunday Best Recordings.

== Discography ==
=== Albums ===
- Prince Blimey (Warp 1996) – UK No. 60
- Making Bones (Warp/Matador Records 1998) – UK No. 59
- Our Aim Is to Satisfy (Warp/Matador Records 2000)
- Key (V2 Benelux 2011)
- Hyena (Lo Recordings 2014)
- Everybody Is Somebody (Lo Recordings 2022)

=== Singles and EPs ===
- The Snapper EP (Flaw Recordings, 1994)
- The Swank EP (Flaw Recordings, 1994)
- Hot Flush (Flaw Recordings, 1995)
- Loopascoopa (Warp Recordings, 1996)
- A Pale Blue Dot (Lo Recordings, 2008)
- Chris Smith EP (Lo Recordings, 2009)
- Card Trick EP (Lo Recordings, 2014)

=== Compilations and remixes ===
- Reeled and Skinned (Warp 1995)
- It's All Good (2002)
- Red Snapper (Lo Recordings 2003)
- Redone (Lo Recordings 2003)

=== Singles ===
- "Image of You" (1998) – UK No. 60
- "Love Boat" (V2 Benelux 2011)
