= Weather Alive =

Studio album by Beth Orton
- Released: 23 September 2022
- Length: 45:43
- Label: Partisan
- Producer: Beth Orton

Beth Orton chronology
Kidsticks (2016)	Weather Alive (2022)	The Ground Above (2026)

Weather Alive is the eighth studio album by English singer-songwriter Beth Orton. The album was released on 23 September 2022 by Partisan Records.

== Background ==
Orton began work on Weather Alive after buying a used upright piano from a dealer at Camden Market in London for £300 (US$350) and creating songs by playing notes around the instrument. In an interview with The New York Times, Orton said of that creation process: "No matter where you touch [the piano], it just has these resonances [...] Little ghosts of other chords just keep ringing out and you're like, "Oh, that speaks of another melody, and that speaks of another feeling." In a press release following the album's announcement on 31 May 2022, Orton described the album as "a sensory exploration that allowed for a connection to a consciousness that I was searching for."

== Singles ==
The album's title track was released as the first single on 31 May 2022. Reviewing for Pitchfork, Sam Sodomsky described Orton's vocal performance as "broken and determined, cresting in a chorus that flows with the emotional cadence of an old soul song."

== Critical reception ==
Professional ratings
Aggregate scores
Source	Rating
Metacritic	85/100
Review scores
Source	Rating
AllMusic	4/5 stars
MusicOMH	3.5/4 stars
Pitchfork	8.7/10
PopMatters	8/10
The Telegraph	4/5 stars

Upon release, Weather Alive received acclaim from critics. At Metacritic, which assigns a normalised rating out of 100 based on reviews from mainstream publications, the album has a score of 85, based on twelve reviews, indicating "universal acclaim".

In the review for PopMatters, Evan Sawdey wrote that the album "unabashedly feels like the record [Orton] needed to make now, and we all feel more Alive because of it." Sam Sodomsky of Pitchfork called it "the best work" of Orton's career, describing it as "soothing, immersive, and self-produced, it conjures a dreamlike atmosphere with songs that spiral out into the ether". Reviewing the album for The Telegraph, Neil McCrommik stated that, "Orton digs so deeply into her own personal spaces and memories that what she finds there is unique. Middle-aged discontent has rarely sounded so lovely."

Describing the album in a review for AllMusic, Marcy Donelson declared that, "Weather Alive nestles into a comparatively hushed, atmospheric blend of acoustic and electronic timbres that's meticulous and nebulous at once." The reception for the album was more muted in a review for MusicOMH, where writer Ben Devlin claimed that some of the "arrangements can feel a little staid" but that overall they don't "keep Weather Alive from being an engrossing listen especially as Orton dominates the proceedings so expertly."

== Track listing ==
All tracks are written by Beth Orton.

Weather Alive track listing
No.	Title	Length
1.	"Weather Alive"	7:05
2.	"Friday Night"	5:34
3.	"Fractals"	5:20
4.	"Haunted Satellite"	4:37
5.	"Forever Young"	5:40
6.	"Lonely"	4:24
7.	"Arms Around a Memory"	5:44
8.	"Unwritten"	7:19
Total length:		45:43

== Personnel ==
Credits for Weather Alive adapted from Tidal.

- Beth Orton – primary artist, composer, production, engineering
- Greg Calbi – mastering
- Craig Silvey – mixing
- Dani Bennett-Spragg – mixing engineering
- Fabio Senna – engineering
- Francine Perry – engineering
- Eliot Lee Hazel – creative director, artwork
- Aaron Mitchell – packaging design

== Charts ==
Chart performance for Weather Alive
Chart (2022)	Peak position
Australian Physical Albums (ARIA)	91
Belgian Albums (Ultratop Flanders)	81
Scottish Albums (Official Charts)	8
UK Albums (Official Charts)	27
UK Independent Albums (Official Charts)	4
