= Any Way You Look =

Single by Northern Uproar

from the album Yesterday, Tomorrow, Today
- Released: 1997

Northern Uproar singles chronology
"Town" (1997)	"Any Way You Look" (1997)	"A Girl I Once Knew" (1997)

"Any Way You Look" is a 1997 single by the Britpop band Northern Uproar. It was the first to be released from their second album Yesterday, Tomorrow, Today. It peaked at number 36 on the UK Top 40 singles chart in May 1997. The song has a noticeable Motown influence.

== Charts ==
Chart (1997)	Peak position
UK Singles (OCC)	36
