= Lodestar (band) =

- Genre: Progressive rock
- Years active: 1996–1997, 2022–present
- Members: John Morgan; Alan Haggarty; Heitham Al-Sayed; Charlie Beddoes
- Past members: Jules Hodgson

Lodestar is a British experimental progressive rock band, formed in 1996 by Heitham Al-Sayed (lead vocalist), John Morgan (drums) and Alan Haggarty (sound engineer) after they left Senser. They were joined by guitarist Jules Hodgson to write and record their self-titled debut album in 1996. Recorded at Monnow Valley Studios in Wales, the album was engineered and produced by Alan Haggarty & Dave Eringa, and released on Ultimate Records.

The band released two singles and one album, and gigged across the UK and Europe from 1996 to 1997.

They were asked to join Tool on their European tour, as support for their album Aenima, including a support slot at the London Astoria.

The band split after a couple of years, and the members went off to pursue other projects, with Al-Sayed, Morgan and Haggarty all working with Senser again at various times. Jules Hodgson went on to play for the industrial bands Pig and KMFDM and moved to the United States.

Around 2018–2019, Al-Sayed, Morgan and Haggarty started conceiving ideas for a second album. Soon after, recording was underway. This second album, called Zonen, was announced to be released in April 2024. It featured Haggarty on bass and guitar, Al-Sayed on vocals with Morgan on drums. Prior to the release of Zonen, three singles were released; "Bring Me The Head", "Surrender To The Tide" and "Flame". The second album was eventually released on May 17, 2024, featuring 11 songs.

They were joined by Charlie Beddoes on bass, with Haggarty moving over to guitar.

== Discography ==
=== Albums ===
- Lodestar CD Album [TOPPCD049] (A&M 1996)
  1. "Another Day"
  2. "Salter's Ducks"
  3. "Wait A Minute"
  4. "Representative"
  5. "By Halves"
  6. "Better Late Than Never"
  7. "Aftertaste"
  8. "Worthwhile"
  9. "Soiled Blood"
  10. "Down In The Mud"
  11. "Iliac Crest"
- Lodestar 12" Vinyl Album [TOPPLP049]
  - Same as above
- Zonen (self-released 2024)
  1. "Surrender To The Tide"
  2. "Bring Me The Head"
  3. "Be Ready"
  4. "Hyperitual"
  5. "Flame"
  6. "1983"
  7. "The Stranger"
  8. "High Sorrow"
  9. "The Real World"
  10. "Sigils Burning"
  11. "The Harp"

=== Singles ===
- "Another Day" CD [TOPP046CD] (1996)
  1. "Another Day"
  2. "All You Need"
  3. "11/8 Koroviev"
- "Another Day" 7" Vinyl [TOPP046] (1996)
  1. "Another Day"
  2. "Force Of Habit"
- "Another Day" 12" Vinyl [TOPP046T] (Ultimate Records 1996)
  1. "Another Day"
  2. "All You Need"
  3. "11/8 Koroviev"
- "Down in the Mud" CD [FEZ001CD] (A&M 1997)
  1. "Down In The Mud"
  2. "Neat, Neat, Neat"
  3. "Down In The Mud" (Primitive Edit)
  4. "Horse"
- "Down in the Mud" 7" Vinyl [FEZ001] (1997)
  1. "Down In The Mud"
  2. "Somnopolis"
- "Bring Me The Head" (self-released 2024)
  1. "Bring Me The Head"
- "Surrender To The Tide" (self-released 2024)
  1. "Surrender To The Tide"
- "Flame" (self-released 2024)
  1. "Flame"

=== Promos ===
- "Another Day" CD (1996)
  1. "Another Day"
  2. "All You Need"
  3. "11/8 Koroviev"
- "Another Day" 12" Vinyl [UKPROMO8T] (1996)
  1. "Another Day"
  2. "Down In The Mud" (Primitive Edit)
- "Down In The Mud" CD (1997)
  1. "Down In The Mud" (Radio Edit)
  2. "Down In The Mud" (Primitive Club Mix)
  3. "Salter's Ducks" (Alternate Mix)
  4. "Aftertaste"
  5. "Down In The Mud"
- "Sampler" (Ultimate Records 1997)
  1. "Down In The Mud" (Radio Edit) (3:38)
  2. "Down In The Mud" (Primitive Club Mix) (4:19)
  3. "Salter's Ducks" (Alternate Mix) (4:08)
  4. "Aftertaste" (4:41)
  5. "Down In The Mud" (4:16)

== Members ==
- Heitham Al-Sayed (vocals, 1996–1997, 2022–present)
- John Morgan (drums, 1996–1997, 2022–present)
- Alan Haggarty (guitar, bass, production, mixing, 1996–1997, 2022–present)
- Charlie Beddoes (bass, 2023–2024)
- Jules Hodgson (guitar, 1996–1997)
