= Dave Eringa =

English record producer, sound and mix engineer

- Born: David James Eringa; 30 July 1971 (age 55); Brentwood, Essex, England
- Occupations: Record producer; audio engineer; mixing engineer
- Instrument: Keyboards
- Years active: 1993–present

David James Eringa (born 30 July 1971) is an English record producer, audio engineer, and mixing engineer.

== Biography ==
He has had a long-standing association with Manic Street Preachers. His early involvement included tea-making duties on their first single, "Motown Junk". He played keyboards on Generation Terrorists, produced and mixed Gold Against the Soul, and played live keyboards with the band from 1993 to 1994. He also produced and mixed two tracks on Everything Must Go ("Australia" and "No Surface All Feeling"), produced and mixed half of This Is My Truth, Tell Me Yours (including the No. 1 single "If You Tolerate This Your Children Will Be Next"), and worked on their first No. 1 single of the new millennium, "The Masses Against the Classes". He also produced and mixed Know Your Enemy and produced Send Away the Tigers.

He has also collaborated extensively with Idlewild, producing and mixing 100 Broken Windows, The Remote Part, and Make Another World, as well as contributing to Warnings/Promises and, more recently, Post Electric Blues.

In 2014, he produced Wilko Johnson and Roger Daltrey's gold-selling album Going Back Home, which subsequently led to production work for The Who and a collaboration with Daltrey on a solo album.

== Production credits ==
Eringa has worked and played on albums by artists including Manic Street Preachers, Idlewild, Wilko Johnson and Roger Daltrey, The Who, Gyroscope, BB Brunes, Calogero, Kylie Minogue, Tom Jones, 3 Colours Red, South and Nine Black Alps.

- 1993 Manic Street Preachers – Gold Against the Soul
- 1994 These Animal Men – Too Sussed
- 1995 Headswim – Flood
- 1996 Manic Street Preachers – Everything Must Go
- 1996 Northern Uproar – Northern Uproar
- 1996 Lodestar – Lodestar
- 1998 Manic Street Preachers – This Is My Truth Tell Me Yours
- 1998 Moke (British band) – Superdrag
- 1999 3 Colours Red – Revolt
- 1999 Toploader – Onka's Big Moka
- 2000 Idlewild – 100 Broken Windows
- 2001 Lowgold – Just Backward of Square
- 2001 Manic Street Preachers – Know Your Enemy
- 2002 Idlewild – The Remote Part
- 2002 Kylie Minogue – Confide in Me
- 2003 South – With the Tides
- 2005 Ocean Colour Scene – A Hyperactive Workout for the Flying Squad
- 2005 Belarus – Communicate
- 2006 Starky – Starky
- 2006 Milburn – Well Well Well
- 2006 James Dean Bradfield – The Great Western
- 2007 Kubichek! – Not Enough Night
- 2007 Manic Street Preachers – Send Away the Tigers
- 2007 Gyroscope – "Breed Obsession"
- 2007 Idlewild – Make Another World
- 2007 The Dykeenies – Nothing Means Everything
- 2009 The Xcerts – In The Cold Wind We Smile
- 2009 The Answering Machine – Another City, Another Sorry
- 2009 Telegraphs – We Were Ghosts
- 2009 Manic Street Preachers – Journal for Plague Lovers (Tracks 4,5 & 8)
- 2009 Idlewild – Post Electric Blues
- 2009 Nine Black Alps – Locked out from the Inside
- 2009 Zico Chain – These Birds Will Kill Us All
- 2009 The Attika State – Measures
- 2010 Manic Street Preachers – Postcards From a Young Man
- 2011 Failsafe – Routines
- 2012 BB Brunes - Long Courier
- 2012 Big City- The Way the Trees Are
- 2012 Sound Of Guns - Angels and Enemies
- 2013 Manic Street Preachers – Rewind the Film
- 2014 Calogero - Les feux d'artifice
- 2014 Wilko Johnson and Roger Daltrey – Going Back Home
- 2015 The Proclaimers - Let's Hear It For The Dogs
- 2016 Beaty Heart - Till The Tomb
- 2018 Manic Street Preachers - Resistance is Futile
- 2018 The Proclaimers - Angry Cyclist
- 2018 Roger Daltrey - As Long I Have You
- 2021 Manic Street Preachers – The Ultra Vivid Lament
- 2024 KillerStar - KillerStar
- 2026 KillerStar - The Afterglow
