= Touch Me with Your Love =

"Touch Me With Your Love"

Single by Beth Orton
- Released: 1996
- Recorded: Wessex, Maison Rouge and Matrix
- Genre: Folk
- Length: 7:27
- Label: Heavenly Records
- Songwriter(s): Ted Barnes, Ali Friend, and Beth Orton
- Producer(s): Andrew Weatherall

"Touch Me With Your Love" is a song by Beth Orton, released as the fourth single from 1996 album Trailer Park. It contains 4 songs, and was released on C.D. and vinyl. The release peaked at #60 in the UK official singles chart. It was also released in Australia with a different track listing, and was Orton's first release to have a promotional video.

== Track listing ==
=== CD: Heavenly / HVN 64CD United Kingdom ===
1. "Touch Me With Your Love" – 7:27
2. "Pedestal" – 4:58
3. "Galaxy of Emptiness (Live at Shepards Bush Empire 1996-11-26)" – 5:52
4. "Touch Me With Your Love (instrumental)" – 6:37

=== CD: Deconstruction / 74321 453 612 Australia ===
1. "Touch Me With Your Love (Radio Edit)" – 4:02
2. "Touch Me With Your Love (Video Edit)" – 4:49
3. "Pedestal" – 4:58
4. "Galaxy of Emptiness (Live at Shepards Bush Empire 1996-11-26)" – 5:52

== Charts ==
| Chart (1997) | Peak position |
|---|---|
| UK Singles (OCC) | 60 |
