= Anywhere (Beth Orton song) =

Single by Beth Orton
- Released: 2002
- Label: Heavenly
- Songwriter: Beth Orton

"Anywhere" is a song by English songwriter Beth Orton, which was released in 2002, both as a CD, and as a DVD (the only Beth Orton release to appear on DVD format) and peaked at #55 in the UK charts. The song appears on the album Daybreaker.

== Track listing ==
=== CD: Heavenly / HVN 125CDS United Kingdom ===
1. "Anywhere" – 4:38
2. "Beautiful World" – 4:09
3. "Anywhere (Two Lone Swordsmen mix)" – 4:02
- CD includes "Anywhere" video on enhanced portion.

=== DVD: Heavenly / HVN 125DVD United Kingdom ===
1. "Anywhere (Two Lone Swordsmen mix)"
2. "Anywhere (album version)"
3. "Concrete Sky (Live at the Social)"
- Track 1 is video, Track 2-3 are audio only.

=== 2x12": Heavenly / HVN 12512P United Kingdom ===
1. "Anywhere (Two Lone Swordsmen Remix Vocal)" – 5:49
2. "Anywhere (Two Lone Swordsmen Remix Instrumental)" – 5:49
1. "Anywhere (Adrian Sherwood's Off Me Rocker Version)" – 5:09
2. "Anywhere (Adrian Sherwood's Off Me Head Cut)" – 4:37
- UK promo

=== 12": Heavenly / HVN 12512PX United Kingdom ===
1. "Anywhere (Photek Tekdub Remix)"
- UK promo
