= Comfort of Strangers =

Studio album by Beth Orton
- Released: 7 February 2006
- Studios: Sear Sound, New York City
- Genre: Folk
- Length: 47:11
- Label: Astralwerks/EMI
- Producer: Jim O'Rourke

Beth Orton chronology
Pass in Time (2003)	Comfort of Strangers (2006)	Sugaring Season (2012)

Singles from Comfort of Strangers
- 1. "Conceived" Released: 30 January 2006; 2. "Shopping Trolley" Released: 26 June 2006; 3. "Heart of Soul" Released: 18 September 2006

Professional ratings
Aggregate scores
Source	Rating
Metacritic	78/100
Review scores
Source	Rating
AllMusic	3.5/5 stars
Entertainment Weekly	B+
Mojo	4/5 stars
NME	6/10
Pitchfork	7.2/10
Rolling Stone	3.5/5 stars
Slant Magazine	4/5 stars
Spin	B+
Stylus Magazine	A−
Uncut	4/5 stars

Comfort of Strangers is the fifth studio album by English singer-songwriter Beth Orton. The album was recorded in just two weeks at New York's Sear Sound studio in the spring of 2005, with musician and composer Jim O'Rourke as producer. It features Orton on guitar, piano and harmonica with O'Rourke on bass, piano and marimba and the American percussionist Tim Barnes on drums.

== Singles ==
"Conceived", released 29 November 2005 as a digital download, and 31 January 2006 on 7" and CD in the UK.

== Track listing ==
All songs were composed by Beth Orton; the title track was written in partnership with O'Rourke and singer-songwriter M. Ward.

1. "Worms" – 2:04
2. "Countenance" – 2:23
3. "Heartland Truckstop" – 2:48
4. "Rectify" – 2:27
5. "Comfort of Strangers" – 3:18
6. "Shadow of a Doubt" – 3:58
7. "Conceived" – 3:27
8. "Absinthe" – 4:02
9. "A Place Aside" – 2:19
10. "Safe in Your Arms" – 4:28
11. "Shopping Trolley" – 2:51
12. "Feral Children" – 3:35
13. "Heart of Soul" – 3:50
14. "Pieces of Sky" – 3:09

=== Limited edition bonus disc ===
1. "What We Begin" – 3:30
2. "On My Way Home" – 3:08
3. "Comfort of Strangers #9" – 3:16
4. "Did Somebody Make a Fool of You?" – 2:16
5. "Northern Sky" – 2:58

== Charts ==
Chart performance for Comfort of Strangers
Chart (2006)	Peak position
Australian Albums (ARIA)	40
Swedish Albums (Sverigetopplistan)	51
UK Albums (Official Charts)	24
US Billboard 200	92
