= She Cries Your Name =

Single by Beth Orton

from the album Superpinkymandy and Trailer Park
- Released: 26 September 1996 & 2 June 1997
- Genre: Folk rock; ambient; trip hop; soul
- Length: 4:47
- Label: Heavenly Records
- Songwriters: Beth Orton, William Orbit
- Producers: Victor Van Vugt, Andrew Weatherall

Beth Orton singles chronology
"Don't Wanna Know About Evil" (1993)	"She Cries Your Name" (1996)	"Touch Me with Your Love" (1996)

"She Cries Your Name" is a song by Beth Orton. It was released as her third single and found on her 1993 debut album Superpinkymandy and again, as a slightly different version, on her 1996 release Trailer Park. It was also re-released in 1997, with a different set of B-sides.

== Background ==
The earliest version of "She Cries Your Name" appeared on Orton's 1993 debut album Superpinkymandy. Another early version of "She Cries Your Name" appears on William Orbit's 1995 album Strange Cargo Hinterland. The Strange Cargo Hinterland version removed Orton's verses from the Superpinkymandy version, but retains her chorus vocals and the original instrumentation. The third and best-known version of the track appeared on Orton's second album, Trailer Park. This version includes all of the lyrics from the Superpinkymandy version, but with different production.

"She Cries Your Name" was the lead single for Trailer Park, released in September 1996. The single was re-released in June 1997 with a different set of B-sides. The initial release peaked at #76, and the re-release at #40 in the UK official singles chart.

=== Video ===
The video for "She Cries Your Name" was filmed at a trailer park in the Mojave Desert, which inspired the title of Orton's album Trailer Park. MTV placed the video into active rotation on September 16, 1997.

== Reception ==
Critics praised Orton's blend of genres on "She Cries Your Name," one reviewer for Option calling the blend of trip-hop, folk music, and soul music "smooth." BBC London presenter Gary Crowley, speaking to Billboard, called "She Cried Your Name" "a fantastic piece of mood music, like a singer/songwriter with a club feel." Spin critic Sarah Vowell called the single the standout track from Trailer Park: "a bittersweet ballad that tastes like tea brewed from tears." It was made NME's single of the week.

A 2009 retrospective in Pitchfork praised the single's longevity, in particular Orton's "cozy, impressionistic Americana sketches" of the lyrics and the production by Victor Van Vugt.

== Track listing ==
=== CD: Heavenly / HVN 60CD United Kingdom ===
1. "She Cries Your Name" - 4:48
2. "Tangent" - 7:29
3. "Safety" - 2:11
4. "It's Not the Spotlight" (Barry Goldberg, Gerry Goffin) (Rod Stewart cover) - 4:18
- 1996 release

=== CD: Heavenly / HVN 68CD United Kingdom ===
1. "She Cries Your Name" - 4:48
2. "Bullet" - 4:38
3. "Best Bit" - 3:05
4. "It's Not the Spotlight" - 4:18
- 1997 re-release
