= Best Bit =

EP by Beth Orton
- Released: 14 December 1997
- Genre: Folk
- Length: 4:15
- Label: Heavenly
- Producers: Youth, Henry Olsen, Dr. Robert

Beth Orton chronology
Trailer Park (1996)	Best Bit (1997)	Central Reservation (1999)

Singles from Best Bit
- 1. "Best Bit" Released: 15 June 1998

Professional ratings
Review scores
Source	Rating
AllMusic	link

Best Bit is an EP released by Beth Orton, prior to her 1999 release Central Reservation. It contains two songs performed with Terry Callier, which are covers of Fred Neil's "Dolphins", and Callier's own "Lean on me". The title track appears in an alternative version on Orton's own single, "She Cries Your Name". It peaked at #36 in the UK official singles chart. The cover was photographed by Sam Harris. The video was directed by Steve Hanft.

== Track listing ==
=== CD: Heavenly HVN 72CD United Kingdom ===
1. "Best Bit" (Orton) - 4:15
2. "Skimming Stone" (Orton, Blanchard, Olsen, Barnes, Read) - 5:48
3. "Dolphins" (Fred Neil) - 4:16
4. "Lean on Me" (Terry Callier) - 5:06

=== CD: Dedicated 61702-44020-2 United States ===
1. "Best Bit" (Orton) - 4:15
2. "Skimming Stone" (Orton, Blanchard, Olsen, Barnes, Read) - 5:48
3. "Dolphins" (Fred Neil) - 4:16
4. "Lean on Me" (Terry Callier) - 5:06
5. "Touch Me with Your Love (Live version)" (Barnes, Friend, Orton) - 5:14
- Track 5 was recorded live on the "Morning Becomes Eclectic" radio show off KCRW-FM in Santa Monica, on 30 May 1997.
