= Concrete Sky =

EP by Beth Orton
- Released: 16 July 2002
- Genre: Folk
- Label: Heavenly Records
- Producer: Victor van Vugt, Ben Watt, Beth Orton

Concrete Sky was the second EP released by Beth Orton, with the lead track taken from her 2002 album Daybreaker. It contains four songs, and was released on CD. "Concrete Sky" features vocals and guitar from Ryan Adams, and was written by Beth Orton and Johnny Marr.

== Track listing ==
1. "Concrete Sky"
2. "Ali's Waltz"
3. "Bobby Gentry"
4. "Carmella" (Four Tet remix)
