= Clayhill =

British folk band

- Origin: London, England
- Genres: Folk
- Instruments: Vocals, guitar
- Years active: 2002–2009

Clayhill was a British three-piece folk band comprising Ali Friend, Ted Barnes and vocalist Gavin Clark. They released their debut album Small Circle in 2004, and released two EPs and another LP, Mine at Last (2006). Throughout the summer of 2006 they toured with Mercury Music Prize winners Gomez and Beth Orton, as the support act on both her UK and US tours to promote Comfort of Strangers.

In 2004, they appeared in the special Christmas concert at the Queen Elizabeth Hall in London as one of Aqualung's special guests. In the same year their song "Afterlight" was used in the soundtrack of acclaimed Shane Meadows thriller Dead Man's Shoes. Their cover of The Smiths's "Please Please Please Let Me Get What I Want" is featured on This Is England, also directed by Meadows.

Gavin Clark, lead singer of Clayhill, is featured on four albums by UNKLE: War Stories, End Titles... Stories for Film, Where Did the Night Fall and Another Night Out. He sings the track "Keys to the Kingdom", "Broken" and several on End Titles... Stories for Film. He was formerly in the band Sunhouse whose music features in Shane Meadows's Twenty Four Seven.

In 2005, Clayhill recorded a version of Tim Buckley's "The River" for the tribute album Dream Brother: The Songs of Tim and Jeff Buckley.

Barnes and Clark provided the original music for another Shane Meadows movie, Somers Town (2008). Tracks by Clayhill and by Clark (co-written with Nick Hemming) also appeared in Meadows's 2009 film, the mockumentary Le Donk & Scor-zay-zee.

During a 5 September 2009 concert at the King's Place Music Festival, the band announced that the performance would be their last.

Gavin Clark died on 16 February 2015.

== Discography ==
- Cuban Green EP (2004)
- Small Circle (2004)
- Acoustic (2005)
- Mine at Last (2006)
- Afterlight (2007)
- One Day We Will Settle (2025)

== See also ==
- Red Snapper, of which Ali Friend was also a member
