= Someone's Daughter =

Single by Beth Orton
- Released: 24 March 1997
- Recorded: Matrix Studios
- Label: Heavenly Records – HVN 65
- Producer: Ian Grimble

"Someone's Daughter" is a song by Beth Orton, released as her fourth single, found on her 1996 release Trailer Park. It contains 3 songs, and was released on C.D. and vinyl. The release peaked at #49 in the UK official singles chart.

== Track listing ==
=== CD: Heavenly / HVN 65CD United Kingdom ===
1. "Someone's Daughter" – 3:37
2. "I Wish I Never Saw The Sunshine" – 4:45
3. "It's This I Am I Find" – 3:49

== Charts ==
Chart (1997)	Peak position
UK Singles (OCC)	49
