= Victor Van Vugt =

- Origin: Australia
- Occupations: Music producer; mixer; engineer

Victor Van Vugt is a music producer, mixer and engineer. An Australian based in Berlin, he has had a long association with the careers of Nick Cave and the Bad Seeds and Beth Orton.

He has also worked with P.J. Harvey, Depeche Mode, Gogol Bordello, The Pogues, The Fall, Einstürzende Neubauten, Billy Bragg, Luna, Athlete, Alison Moyet, The Disposable Heroes of Hiphoprisy and Australian acts such as Sarah Blasko, Clare Bowditch, The Panics, Augie March, Robert Forster, Dave Graney, The Triffids, The Go-Betweens and The Blackeyed Susans .

== Awards and nominations ==
The Nick Cave & Kylie Minogue duet, "Where The Wild Roses Grow", produced by Van Vugt, won the ARIA Award for Song Of The Year in 1996.

The Nick Cave and the Bad Seeds album Murder Ballads was nominated for Album Of The Year.

The P.J. Harvey album Stories From The City, Stories From The Sea won the Mercury Prize Album Of The Year and was nominated for Best Alternative Album Of The Year, Grammy Award.

The Beth Orton album Trailer Park was nominated for the Mercury Prize, Album Of The Year.

The Beth Orton album Central Reservation was nominated for Album Of The Year, Brit Award.

The Athlete album Vehicles & Animals, produced, mixed and engineered by Van Vugt was nominated for the Mercury Prize in 2003.

The Emmett Tinley album Attic Faith, produced, mixed and engineered by Van Vugt was nominated for the Choice Music Prize in 2005.

== Credits include ==
- 1984 The Moodists: Thirsty's Calling
- 1985 The Apartments: The Evening Visits...and Stays For Years
- 1987 Claw Boys Claw: Crack My Nut
- 1989 Nick Cave and the Bad Seeds: The Good Son
- 1992 Epic Soundtracks: Rise Above
- 1993 Kirsty MacColl: Titanic Days
- 1994 Luna: Bewitched
- 1995 Dave Graney & The Coral Snakes: The Soft 'N' Sexy Sound
- 1995 Mick Harvey: Intoxicated Man
- 1995 The Walkabouts: Devil's Road
- 1996 Nick Cave and the Bad Seeds: Murder Ballads
- 1996 Beth Orton: Trailer Park
- 1997 Mick Harvey: Pink Elephants
- 1997 The Walkabouts: Nighttown
- 1997 The Blackeyed Susans: Spin the Bottle
- 1998 Augie March: Thanks for the Memes
- 1999 Beth Orton: Central Reservation
- 2001 P.J. Harvey: Stories from the City, Stories from the Sea
- 2001 Anika Moa: Thinking Room
- 2002 Beth Orton: Daybreaker
- 2003 Athlete: Vehicles & Animals
- 2004 Emmett Tinley: Attic Faith
- 2005 Athlete: Tourist
- 2005 Fischerspooner: Odyssey
- 2005 Shivaree: Who's Got Trouble
- 2005 Sons and Daughters: The Repulsion Box
- 2006 Sarah Blasko: What the Sea Wants, The Sea Will Have
- 2006 Barry Adamson: Stranger on the Sofa
- 2006 Mojave 3: Puzzles Like You
- 2007 Favourite Sons: Down Beside Your Beauty
- 2007 Gogol Bordello: Super Taranta!
- 2007 The Panics: Cruel Guard
- 2007 Emma Pollock: Watch the Fireworks
- 2007 Voxtrot: Voxtrot
- 2008 Liam Frost: We Ain't Got No Money, Honey But We Got Rain
- 2008 The Hampdens: The Last Party
- 2009 The Brute Chorus: The Brute Chorus
- 2010 Clare Bowditch: Modern Day Addiction
- 2010 Lucky Soul: A Coming Of Age
- 2010 Glenn Richards: Glimjack
- 2011 Dave Graney: Rock 'n' Roll Is Where I Hide
- 2011 Seeker Lover Keeper: Seeker Lover Keeper
- 2011 The Knocks: The Magic
- 2013 The Levellers: Static On The Airwaves
- 2013 Clubfeet: Heirs and Graces
- 2013 Adalita: All Day Venus
- 2016 Rita Redshoes: Her
- 2017 Cub Sport: Bats
- 2018 Them There: Love is an Elevator
- 2019 Robert Forster: Inferno
