= Beth Orton =

English musician (born 1970)

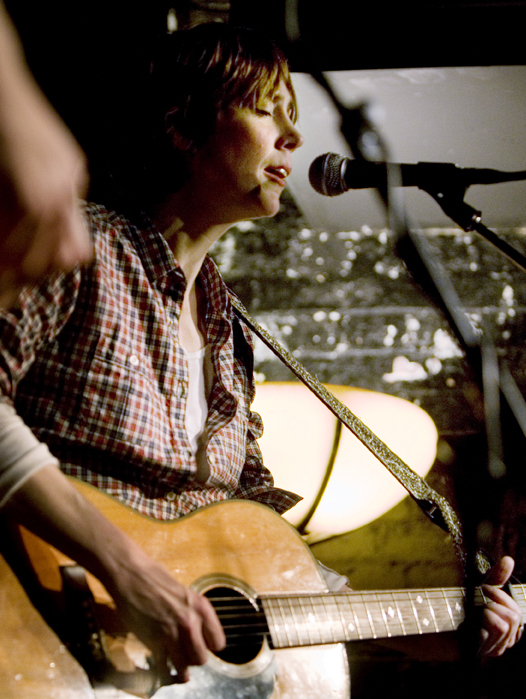
- Orton at the Mojo club night at the Slaughtered Lamb, Clerkenwell 2009

Background information
- Born: Elizabeth Caroline Orton; 14 December 1970 (age 55); Dereham, Norfolk, England
- Origin: Norwich, England
- Genres: Folktronica; folk rock; trip hop
- Occupations: Musician; singer; songwriter
- Instruments: Vocals; guitar; keyboards; synthesizer
- Years active: 1993–present
- Labels: Heavenly (1996–2005); EMI-UK (2005–present); Astralwerks (2003–2010); ANTI- (2010–present); Decca (2020–present)
- Spouse: Sam Amidon
- Website: BethOrtonOfficial.com

Elizabeth Caroline Orton (born 14 December 1970) is an English musician. Known for her "folktronica" sound, which mixes elements of folk and electronica, she was initially recognised for her collaborations with William Orbit, Andrew Weatherall, Red Snapper and the Chemical Brothers in the mid-1990s. Her UK/US first solo album, Trailer Park, received much critical acclaim in 1996. Orton developed a devoted audience with the release of the BRIT Award-winning album Central Reservation (1999) and the 2002 UK top 10 album, Daybreaker. Her 2006 album, Comfort of Strangers, was followed by a break during which Orton gave birth to her daughter and collaborated with the British guitarist Bert Jansch. Orton returned with Sugaring Season in 2012, which moved towards a purer acoustic sound, followed by a return to electronic music with Kidsticks, released in 2016.

Orton's music has been featured in the movies How to Deal and Vanilla Sky, and also in the TV series Felicity, Charmed, Dawson's Creek, Roswell, Grey's Anatomy and Manifest, providing her with exposure to a more mainstream American audience.

== Early life and career ==
Orton was born in Dereham, Norfolk, but moved to Dalston, East London, at age fourteen. Her father, a public relations consultant and journalist, left her mother when Orton was eleven, and she lived with her mother, a journalist and political activist, and her two brothers, her father dying shortly afterwards. Orton studied A-levels at City College Norwich. Her mother died from cancer in 1989, when Orton was aged 19, which led to her travelling to Thailand for a short period, living with Buddhist nuns. On returning to London, Orton worked at jobs such as a waitress at Pizza Hut, and she even briefly owned her own catering company. Orton was an actress before becoming a musician, initially enrolling at the Anna Scher Theatre School. She toured in an experimental stage adaptation of Une Saison en Enfer with a theatre company touring throughout the UK, Russia and Ukraine, playing Arthur Rimbaud's lover.

While pursuing her musical interests in the underground London scene, she linked up with up-and-coming producers William Orbit and The Chemical Brothers who she performed with at live shows as well as joining them in the studio. She partnered with Andrew Weatherall to produce her first major solo album, the Brit Award-nominated Trailer Park.

== Musical career ==
=== SuperPinkyMandy ===
Orton began working with William Orbit on an LP together as Spill, entitled Burn Blind. "Don't Wanna Know 'Bout Evil" was the first track on the album that ended up being released in just Orton's name. Superpinkymandy was named after a rag doll which she bought at a jumble sale at the age of six. This rare album was released only in Japan, in extremely limited numbers (popularly quoted as between 1,000 and 5,000 copies). The sound is very much Orbit's, but all of the songs (except "Don't Wanna Know 'Bout Evil" written by John Martyn) were co-written by Orton and Orbit, and some tracks were later recycled, in very different versions. "She Cries Your Name" later appeared on Trailer Park. "Yesterday's Gone" became "Montok Point" on the fourth Strange Cargo release, Hinterland (1995). Hinterland had Orton's vocals on several tracks, and also included an alternative version of "She Cries Your Name".

=== Early collaborations ===
Orton provided a one-word vocal to the first Red Snapper EP in 1994 ("Snapper"), then co-wrote and sang on "In Deep" on The Swank EP (also 1994). Ali Friend from Red Snapper later joined Orton's band.

It was roughly at this time that she met Ed Simons and Tom Rowlands of The Chemical Brothers and began the first in a series of collaborations, providing vocals for the track "Alive Alone" on Exit Planet Dust (1995). She would later provide vocals for the tracks "Where Do I Begin" on Dig Your Own Hole (1997) and "The State We're In" on Come with Us (2002). In 2018 she and The Chemical Brothers released a long-lost cover of Tim Buckley's "I Never Asked to Be Your Mountain", a collaborative effort dating back from the late '90s, when the three were sharing space in London’s Orinoco studios. According to Mixmag "Orton said she rediscovered the tune after it fell out of an unread copy of War and Peace."

=== Trailer Park ===
Her first solo single, a cover of The Ronettes' "I Wish I Never Saw the Sunshine", was released, again in extremely limited numbers, in mid-1996, and was followed by "She Cries Your Name", shortly before the release of what she herself considers to be her first LP Trailer Park, released on Heavenly Records on 19 October 1996. This release earned her nominations for two BRIT Awards (best British newcomer, best British female) and the Mercury Music Prize in 1997, was well received by critics, and sold modestly well, selling 300,000 copies and peaking at No. 68 in the UK. The album presented Orton's signature sound, an innovative mix of acoustic-based songwriting and electronic beats and elements. She began to tour this record, first supporting acts such as The Beautiful South, and appearing with Ron Sexsmith, before touring on her own. In June 1997, she had her first UK Top 40 hit single with a reissue of "She Cries Your Name".

=== Central Reservation ===
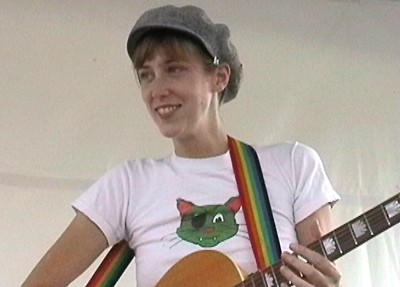
Orton at Lilith Fair, 1999

That summer she toured with Lilith Fair, released the Best Bit EP which included the single "Best Bit", and collaborated with soul legend Terry Callier on a cover of Fred Neil's song "Dolphins". That song improved on her previous best chart position, reaching number 38 in the UK. Central Reservation, her second album (proper), helped Orton build on the success of her début. Although retaining the electronic edge of the former, this record showed a notably more acoustic side with a few tracks consisting purely of Orton's vocals accompanied by a solitary acoustic guitar, with subject matters becoming more introspective, including "Pass in Time", a song about the death of her mother. Despite this style, the album still provided more polished moments such as lead single "Stolen Car", the jazz-and-strings-tinged "Sweetest Decline", and the electro melancholy of "Stars All Seem to Weep" (with the haunting vocal allegedly recorded in a single take). The album also featured notable contributions from soul musician Terry Callier, Dr. Robert and Ben Harper. Two tracks were produced by Ben Watt of Everything But The Girl.

The album earned Orton a second Mercury Music Prize nomination and won the Best Female Artist award at the 2000 BRIT Awards.

Central Reservation is ranked number 982 in All-Time Top 1000 Albums (3rd. edition, 2000).

=== Daybreaker ===
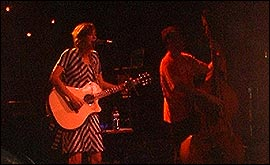
Orton performing in Bristol, 2002

In July 2002, Orton released the album Daybreaker, which again blended the early electronica style, with uptempo pop songs and acoustic ballads. It featured guest appearances from musicians such as the Chemical Brothers, Emmylou Harris, whom she met at Lilith Fair, Ryan Adams and Four Tet. It was a great commercial success, reaching the top 8 of the UK Albums Chart, and received largely positive reviews from the press, ranging from "Her best work yet" from Mojo magazine, the NME (8/10), Rolling Stone and The Guardian, but receiving a more lukewarm reception from Q (despite this, she was nominated for the Q award for best album). This was followed in 2003 by a US-only release on American label Astralwerks, The Other Side of Daybreak, an album consisting mainly of B-sides and remixes of songs from Daybreaker, created by artists such as Roots Manuva. She also contributed a song to the War Child charity, for their Hope compilation album that year.

Daybreaker debuted at No. 40 on the Billboard 200 and has sold 155,000 copies in the U.S., according to Nielsen SoundScan.

A "best of" double album, titled Pass in Time, was released in 2003. It represented Orton's extensive and diverse musical career through previously unreleased songs, B-sides, and rarities (such as "Where Do You Go" from Superpinkymandy), as well as collaborations with William Orbit and the Chemical Brothers. On 31 March 2003, she played to a packed Royal Albert Hall in London on the last date of her worldwide Daybreaker tour. In addition, she played a tribute concert to Elliott Smith in November.

=== Comfort of Strangers ===
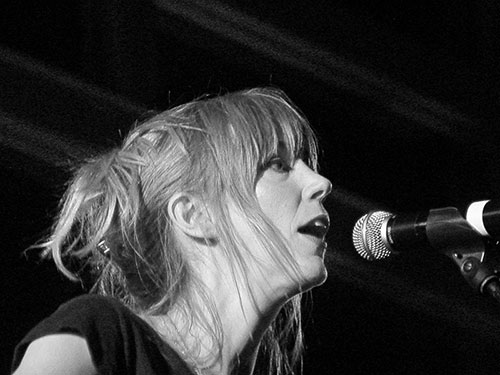
Orton at Aarhus Festival, 2013

Orton's fourth studio album, Comfort of Strangers, was released in February 2006. The North American release was through Astralwerks, and the UK release was through EMI-UK. The release saw her move away from the electronica element that she is usually associated with, to a more stripped down traditional alt-folk album. This album followed an extended absence since her previous release, partially a result of several production attempts, and the parting of ways between her and Heavenly Records. The album was produced by musician Jim O'Rourke. It was widely acclaimed, with critics noting the depth and focus of the songwriting and the stripped-down quality of the music.

=== Sugaring Season ===
On 11 July 2012, Sugaring Season was announced on Orton's official website as the follow-up album to Comfort of Strangers. It was released on ANTI-, her first through that label, on 1 October 2012, in the UK and the next day in the US. Recorded in Portland, Oregon, US, the album was produced by Tucker Martine and expanded on the purely acoustic sound of her previous record, with many of the songs written in the open guitar tunings Orton had learned from Bert Jansch in the years previous. The album was largely recorded live, with a band consisting of Brian Blade on drums, Sebastian Sternberg on bass and Rob Burger on keyboards. Additional guitar work came from Marc Ribot and Ted Barnes, with backing vocals by Laura Veirs and Sam Amidon. Sugaring Season was widely received as a return to form, with many critics calling it her finest album to date.

Paste magazine said, "Blessed with great songs, wonderful arrangements and vocal performances that seriously raise the bar in our expectations of what she's capable of, it is a record that shows real artistic growth in every area and is destined to become a classic that rivals Trailer Park and Central Reservation", while Pitchfork called it "10 songs of sweet resilience delivered by a voice of seemingly effortless expression." Her solo concert in November 2016 was named a top gig of the year by chief New York Times critic John Pareles, who stated, "Alone onstage with her acoustic guitar for much of her set, Ms. Orton set up steady, mantralike picking patterns, a backdrop of serene constancy for the turmoil of ache and determination in her vocals. The songs were hypnotic, the audience silently rapt." The album release was followed by extensive touring in the UK and elsewhere in Europe, solo and with her band, and included an appearance as musical guest on The Late Show with David Letterman.

=== Kidsticks ===
Orton's sixth studio album, Kidsticks, was released on 27 May 2016 and marked a distinct turn towards a purely electronic sound, with her playing keyboards and synthesizers instead of acoustic guitar. The album was produced by Orton herself alongside Andrew Hung from the band Fuck Buttons, who provided drum and synth programming. The album included contributions from Chris Taylor of Grizzly Bear, George Lewis Jr from Twin Shadow and composer Dustin O’Halloran. Kidsticks was released on 27 May 2016 following extensive airplay of the singles "Moon" and "1973" on BBC 6Music and elsewhere. In October 2016, Orton returned to Later ... with Jools Holland, performing the singles "1973" and "Wave". The Guardian wrote that "Kidsticks is a real reinvention: not so much a return to her electronic roots as a bold exploration of fresh territory."

Orton was criticised over her music video for the song "1973" in which she is shown spray painting a federally protected Joshua tree and other desert plant life. After an outcry from the local community, which included a petition on change.org, the music video was removed online. Orton publicly apologised and the Mojave Desert Trust responded positively to her outreach, stating, "We appreciate that Beth Orton regrets her prior actions, and that she intends to educate others about the natural beauty of the Mojave Desert, and the responsibility we collectively share for protecting this unique environment from vandalism and harm."

=== Band ===
Orton's consistent band from 1999's Central Reservation until around 2006 was guitarist Ted Barnes, keyboardist Sean Read, ex-Sandals drummer Will Blanchard and former Red Snapper member Ali Friend on bass. However, this had changed by 2008, with Ali and Ted having moved on to form their own band Clayhill, and Ted having pursued his own projects, with Orton guesting on his solo debut album, Short Scenes. After that Orton's touring band consisted of Amidon, Steinberg, with Steven Nistor on drums, and her current touring band consists of Alex Thomas on sticks, vocals and electronics, and Grey McMurray on guitar, bass and electronics.

Orton played at the One Big No concert in March 2003 at the Shepherd's Bush Empire in London, organised by Emily Eavis, and has participated in concerts hosted by producer Hal Willner, including the 2006 concert film Leonard Cohen: I'm Your Man, and performing a duet with Nick Cave as part of Willner's Allen Ginsberg Tribute at the Ace Theater in Los Angeles, in spring of 2015.

== Acting ==
Orton played the female lead in the independent film Southlander in 2001. She returned to acting with a leading role in the British independent film Light Years (2015), directed by Esther May Campbell.

== Personal life ==
Orton gave birth to a daughter in mid-December 2006. She cancelled her September 2006 UK tour because of her pregnancy. She is now married to musician Sam Amidon and the two have a son, born in 2011. They lived in Los Angeles until 2015 before returning to London. She suffers from Crohn's disease and complications from previous medications.

== Awards and nominations ==
Award	Year	Category	Nominee(s)	Result	Ref.
BMI London Awards	2000	College Song of the Year	"Stolen Car"	Won	
Best Art Vinyl	2022	Best Vinyl Art	Weather Alive	Nominated	
Brit Awards	1998	British Breakthrough Act	Herself	Nominated	
Brit Awards	1998	British Female Solo Artist	Herself	Nominated	
Brit Awards	2000	British Female Solo Artist	Herself	Won	
Brit Awards	2003	British Female Solo Artist	Herself	Nominated	
Mercury Prize	1997	Album of the Year	Trailer Park	Nominated	
Mercury Prize	1999	Album of the Year	Central Reservation	Nominated	
NME Awards	1998	Best Solo Artist	Herself	Nominated	
NME Awards	2000	Best Solo Artist	Herself	Nominated	
Pollstar Concert Industry Awards	1998	Best New Artist Tour	Tour	Nominated	
Q Awards	2002	Best Album	Daybreaker	Nominated	

== Discography ==
- Superpinkymandy (1993)
- Trailer Park (1996)
- Central Reservation (1999)
- Daybreaker (2002)
- Comfort of Strangers (2006)
- Sugaring Season (2012)
- Kidsticks (2016)
- Weather Alive (2022)
- The Ground Above (2026)

== Filmography ==
- Southlander (2001)
- Charmed, "San Francisco Dreamin'" (Season 5, Episode 14) (2003)
- Leonard Cohen: I'm Your Man (2005)
- Light Years (2015)
