= Gyroscope discography =

- Studio albums: 4
- EPs: 5
- Singles: 13

The discography of Australian rock group Gyroscope consists of four studio albums, thirteen singles, and five EPs.

== Albums ==
=== Studio albums ===
List of studio albums, with selected chart positions and certifications
Title	Album details	Peak chart positions	Certifications (sales thresholds)
Title	Album details	AUS	Certifications (sales thresholds)
First... (by Gyroscope Sunday)	Released: 1998; Label: Independent; Formats: MC	—	
Gyroscope Demo	Released: June 1999; Label: Feeble Records; Formats: MC	—	
Around the World in 16 Songs^{[A]}	Released: 15 June 2003; Label: Freedumb Records; Formats: CD	—	
Sound Shattering Sound	Released: 14 June 2004; Label: Festival Mushroom; Formats: CD	37	
Are You Involved?	Released: 25 September 2005; Label: Festival Mushroom; Formats: CD	20	
Breed Obsession	Released: 8 March 2008; Label: Warner; Formats: CD	1	ARIA: Gold
Cohesion	Released: 9 April 2010; Label: Island Australia; Formats: CD	3	
"—" denotes a recording that did not chart or was not released in that territory.

Notes

- A. Around the World in 16 Songs is a split album with four tracks, "S4", "Half Your Problem", "So Wrong" and "Mediocre" by Gyroscope. Additional 12 tracks consist of four tracks each by NSF, Wackykids and Turtlehead.

=== Compilation albums ===
List of compilation albums, with selected details
Title	Album details
Injuring Yourself Whilst Making Music	Released: April 2001; Label: Independent; Formats: MC
The Best of Gyroscope	Released: 7 May 2010; Label: Warner; Formats: CD

== Extended plays ==
List of extended plays, with selected chart positions
Title	EP details	Peak chart positions
Title	EP details	AUS
Scalectrix	Released: April 2000; Label: Independent; Formats: MC	—
Means to an End	Released: 2000; Label: Independent; Formats: MC	—
Take Time	Released: 19 May 2002; Label: Redline Records	—
Midnight Express	Released: 2 May 2003; Label: Festival Mushroom Records	179
Driving for the Storm / Doctor Doctor	Released: September 2003; Label: Festival Mushroom Records	—^{[B]}
"—" denotes a recording that did not chart in that territory.

Notes

- B. Driving for the Storm EP peaked at No. 11 on the ARIA Heatseekers Albums Chart.

== Singles ==
List of singles, with selected chart positions and certifications, showing year released and album name
Title	Year	Peak chart positions		Certifications	Album
Title	Year	AUS	Hottest 100	Certifications	Album
"Doctor, Doctor"	2003	—	92		Driving for the Storm / Doctor Doctor EP
"Safe Forever"	2004	65	97		Sound Shattering Sound
"Take This for Granted"	2004	—	—		Sound Shattering Sound
"Get Down"	2004	—	—		Sound Shattering Sound
"Fast Girl / Beware Wolf"	2006	43	29 / 62		Are You Involved?
"Dream vs. Scream"^{[C]}	2006	—	—		Are You Involved?
"Snakeskin"	2007	30	16		Breed Obsession
"1981"	2008	67	85		Breed Obsession
"Australia"	2008	52	—		Breed Obsession
"These Days"	2008	—	—		Breed Obsession
"Some of the Places I Know"^{[D]}	2010	32	—		Cohesion
"Baby, I'm Gettin' Better"	2010	34	40	ARIA: Platinum	Cohesion
"What Do I Know About Pain?"	2010	—	—		Cohesion
"Fifty500"	2011	—	—		Cohesion
"Crooked Thought/Dabs"	2017	—	—		Non-album single
"My Broken Spine"	2025	—	—		Non-album single
"—" denotes releases that did not chart or were not released in that territory.

Notes

- C. "Dream vs. Scream" was released as a radio single and as a digital download in June 2006
- D. "Live Without You" was uploaded to their MySpace page in December 2009 as a preview for Cohesion. However, "Some of the Places I Know" was the first official single from the album

== Other appearances ==
- "Sexxxy" (acoustic) – Triple J Live
- "Monument" – Triple J Like a Version Vol. 2 – Jebediah Cover
- "Cannonball" – No Man's Woman – The Breeders Cover
- "Heaven & Hell" – "Easyfever" Easybeats Tribute Album
