= Smoke and mirrors (disambiguation) =

Smoke and mirrors is a metaphor, originating from 18th and 19th-century phantasmagoria shows, for a deceptive, fraudulent or insubstantial explanation or description

Smoke and mirrors may also refer to:

== Arts, entertainment, and media ==
=== Literature ===
- Smoke and Mirrors (Gaiman book), a 1998 short story and poetry collection by Neil Gaiman
- Smoke and Mirrors (novel), a 2008 crime novel by Kel Robertson
- Smoke and Mirrors (2016), the third novel in Elly Griffiths' Stephens & Mephisto Mystery series
- Smoke and Mirrors (2005), a novel by Tanya Huff in the Smoke Books series
- Smoke and Mirrors (2023), an account of the Coleco Chameleon by Mike James

=== Albums ===
- Smoke + Mirrors, a 2015 album by Imagine Dragons
- Smoke & Mirrors (The Datsuns album), 2006
- Smoke & Mirrors (Lifehouse album), 2010
- Smoke & Mirrors (The Petty Thefts album), or the title song
- Smoke & Mirrors (The Fizz album), 2020
- Smoke and Mirrors (O.C. album), 2005
- Smoke and Mirrors (Brett Dennen album), 2013
- Smoke and Mirrors (Lynch Mob album), 2009
- Smoke n Mirrors, an album by B-Real, or the title song
- Smoke and Mirrors, an album by Martin Simpson
- Smoke and Mirrors, an EP by The Casket Lottery
- Smoke & Mirrors, a DVD by Arena
- Smoke and Mirrors, the debut album by The Eden House

=== Songs ===
- "Smoke & Mirrors" (Paloma Faith song)
- "Smoke & Mirrors", a song by Demi Lovato from her album Tell Me You Love Me
- "Smoke & Mirrors", a song by King Gizzard & the Lizard Wizard from Made in Timeland
- "Smoke & Mirrors", a song by No Malice from his album Hear Ye Him
- "Smoke & Mirrors", a song by Skye Sweetnam from her album Noise from the Basement
- "Smoke and Mirrors" (Imagine Dragons song)
- "Smoke and Mirrors", a song by Abigail Williams from In the Shadow of a Thousand Suns
- "Smoke and Mirrors", a song by Black Veil Brides from Set the World on Fire
- "Smoke and Mirrors", a song by Dead to Fall from The Phoenix Throne
- "Smoke and Mirrors", a song by Gotye from Making Mirrors
- "Smoke and Mirrors", a song by The Magnetic Fields from Get Lost
- "Smoke and Mirrors", a song by Poets of the Fall from Twilight Theater
- "Smoke and Mirrors", a song by Puscifer from Money Shot
- "Smoke and Mirrors", a song by The Receiving End of Sirens from The Earth Sings Mi Fa Mi
- "Smoke and Mirrors", a song by RJD2 from Deadringer
- "Smoke and Mirrors", a song by Symphony X from Twilight in Olympus
- "Smoke and Mirrors", a song used as the entrance theme of WWE wrestler Cody Rhodes
- "Smoke 'N' Mirrors", a song by KSI featuring Tiggs da Author, Lunar C and Nick Brewer from the 2016 extended play Keep Up
- "Mirrors & Smoke", a song by Jars of Clay from their 2006 album Good Monsters

=== Television ===
- Smoke & Mirrors (TV series), a South African drama series
- "Smoke & Mirrors" (Agent Carter), a 2016 episode
- "Smoke and Mirrors" (The Crown), a 2016 episode
- "Smoke and Mirrors" (The IT Crowd), a 2007 episode
- "Smoke and Mirrors" (Runaways), a 2019 episode
- "Smoke and Mirrors" (Spooks), a 2003 episode
- "Smoke & Mirrors" (Stargate SG-1), a 2002 episode

=== Other arts, entertainment, and media ===
- Smoke & Mirrors (2016 film), a Spanish thriller film
- Smoke and Mirrors: The Story of Tom Savini, a 2015 documentary about Horror makeup artist Tom Savini
- Smoke and Mirrors, a 2012 comic series by Mike Costa
- Penn & Teller's Smoke and Mirrors, an unreleased video game
- Smoke & Mirrors E-zine, an electronic magazine for magicians and mentalists
- "Smoke and Mirrors", from the series of audiobooks Doctor Who: Destiny of the Doctor
- Smoke and Mirrors: The War on Drugs and the Politics of Failure, 1996 book by Dan Baum

== Technology ==
- Smoke & Mirrors, one of three codenames for the Twentieth Anniversary Macintosh
