= Harmonic Generator =

EP by The Datsuns
- Released: 2003
- Genre: Rock
- Producer: The Datsuns

The Datsuns chronology
The Datsuns (2002)	Harmonic Generator (2003)	Outta Sight, Outta Mind (2004)

Harmonic Generator is a Japanese six track EP by New Zealand rock band The Datsuns. It contains radio sessions of three songs and live studio recordings of a further three (see below for track listing). It also contains the music video for Harmonic Generator as an enhanced multimedia track.

It is named after the guitar distortion pedal used on the track: the 'Prunes & Custard - Harmonic Generator Intermodulator' manufactured by Crowther Audio.

== Track listing ==
1. "Harmonic Generator" (live)
2. "Sittin' Pretty" (live)
3. "Fink for the man" (live)
4. "Little Bruise"
5. "O Woe Is Me"
6. "Freeze Sucker"
7. "Harmonic Generator" (Enhanced track)
