= Viva La Bands =

Compilation album by various artists
- Released: June 21, 2005
- Genre: Rock, metal

Various artists chronology
Viva La Bands (2005)	Viva La Bands, Volume 2 (2007)

Viva La Bands is a music compilation album by professional skateboarder and television personality Bam Margera, released on June 21, 2005. It features songs from some of Margera's favorite artists.

A second volume, Viva La Bands, Volume 2, was released in September 2007, coinciding with a US tour headlined by bands like Cradle of Filth, Gwar, CKY and Vains of Jenna.

== Track listing ==
1. "The King of Rock 'n Roll" - Daniel Lioneye
2. "Soul on Fire" – HIM
3. "Lost Boys" – The 69 Eyes
4. "Cold Black Days" – Atrocity
5. "Guilty" – The Rasmus
6. "Rock'n Roll" – The Sounds
7. "In My Heaven" – Negative
8. "King" – Fireball Ministry
9. "All My Friends Are Dead" – Turbonegro
10. "Blacken My Thumb" – The Datsuns
11. "Mice and Gods" – Clutch
12. "Familiar Realm" – CKY
13. "Sleeping My Day Away" – D-A-D
14. "I Don't Care as Long as You Sing" – Beatsteaks
15. "Big Shot" – Kill Hannah
16. "English Fire" – Cradle of Filth
17. "Skull Heaven" – Viking Skull
18. "Route 666" – Helltrain
19. "C'mon Let's Go" – Bend Over
20. "Needled 24/7" – Children of Bodom
21. "Good Morning Headache" – Smack
22. "I Got Erection!" – Gnarkill

== Bonus content ==
The album was packaged with a DVD with never-before-seen video footage of Margera and the CKY crew, shot for the TV series Viva La Bam. The footage is known as the "Lost Episode" of the series.
