= System Overload =

System Overload may refer to:

- "System Overload" (song), a 2006 song by the Datsuns
- System Overload (album), a 2009 album by HDK
