= Take Time =

Take Time may refer to:

- "Take Time", a song by The Books from their 2003 album The Lemon of Pink
- Take Time (Gyroscope EP), a 2002 EP by Gyroscope
- Take Time (Giveon EP), a 2020 EP by Giveon
