= Highschool Hoodlums =

Single by The Datsuns

from the album Headstunts
- B-side: "Your Bones"
- Released: March 2008
- Recorded: 2008
- Genre: Rock, garage rock
- Label: Hellsquad
- Songwriters: Ben Cole, Dolf de Borst, Christian Livingstone, Phil Somervell
- Producers: Ben Cole, Dolf de Borst, Christian Livingstone, Phil Somervell

The Datsuns singles chronology
"System Overload" (2006)	"Highschool Hoodlums" (2008)

"Highschool Hoodlums" was released as a garage rock single for the Datsuns' fourth album, Head Stunts via Hellsquad Records. It was sold in vinyl format at their live shows during their New Zealand tour in March 2008. The song was co-written by band members Ben Cole (drums), Dolf de Borst (vocals, bass guitar), Christian Livingstone (guitar) and Phil Somervell (guitar). It was produced by the band members.

The song reached number 1 on the Kiwi FM top 10 in March 2008. It is featured in the 2010 Miracle Whip commercial.
