= Baby, I'm Gettin' Better =

"Baby I'm Gettin' Better"

Single by Gyroscope

from the album Cohesion
- Released: 17 May 2010
- Genre: Alternative rock
- Length: 3:19
- Label: Island, Universal
- Songwriter(s): Daniel Sanders, Rob Nassif, Brad Campbell, Zoran Trivic
- Producer(s): Gil Norton

Gyroscope singles chronology
"Some of the Places I Know" (2010)	"Baby I'm Gettin' Better" (2010)	"What Do I Know About Pain?" (2010)

"Baby I'm Gettin' Better" is the second single from Australian alternative rock band Gyroscope's fourth studio album, Cohesion. It was released digitally on 17 May 2010. The single become the second top 40 hit from Cohesion on the ARIA Singles Chart, which peaked at No. 34 and spent a total of fourteen weeks in the top 50. The song is the group's third highest-charting single behind previous singles "Some of the Places I Know" and "Snakeskin". By the end of the year it was certified gold by Australian Recording Industry Association (ARIA).

"Baby, I'm Gettin' Better" polled at No. 40 on national radio, Triple J's Hottest 100 for 2010.

In interview by Lucy Valentine for the [AU] Review, with Rob Nassif, the band's drummer revealed that "We originally weren't gonna record it because the original version of that song is like an acoustic country tune. And we really liked the tune, we always thought it had great melodies and a great chorus, but we always felt it was a country tune and we were trying to write a rock record." Gil Norton, the album's producer, coaxed the band to re-do it: "He encouraged us to rock it up, and the rocked up version is what you hear on the album!"

In a review at Sputnik Music, Mike Allen, considers that the song "conveys Sanders at a compelling and passionate level, as he elevates a rather uneventful track with the assistance of some warming harmonies. Most significantly, Sanders exhibits the capability of precisely accentuating the mood; solidifying his role as an effective front-man."

== Track listing ==
All tracks are written by Daniel Sanders, Brad Campbell, Rob Nassif, Zoran Trivic

No.	Title	Length
1.	"Baby, I'm Gettin' Better"	3:19

== Charts ==
Chart (2010)	Peak position
Australia (ARIA)	34

== Certifications ==
Region	Certification	Certified units/sales
Australia (ARIA)	Platinum	70,000^{‡}
^{‡} Sales+streaming figures based on certification alone.
