= Lit Up/Let Down =

Studio album by Vains of Jenna
- Released: October 24, 2006
- Recorded: 2006
- Genres: Glam metal, hard rock
- Length: 47:32
- Label: Filthy Note
- Producer: Bam Margera

Vains of Jenna chronology
Lit Up/Let Down (2006)	The Art of Telling Lies (2009)

Professional ratings
Review scores
Source	Rating
KNAC	link
PunkTV	link

Lit Up/Let Down is the debut album by the Swedish glam metal band Vains of Jenna. It was released on October 24, 2006 by Bam Margera's music label Filthy Note. The first track of the album, "Don't Give a Damn" featured as the theme song for Bam Margera's MTV series Bam's Unholy Union. The first single was "No One's Gonna Do It for You", and was followed up with a music video directed and produced by Bam Margera.

== Track listing ==
1. "Don't Give a Damn" – 5:49
2. "Ceased Emotions" – 3:22
3. "Hard to Be Vain" – 4:53
4. "Lit Up/Let Down" – 5:42
5. "Get on the Ride" – 4:27
6. "Baby's Got a Secret" – 3:55
7. "No One's Gonna Do It for You" – 3:12
8. "Set It Off" – 6:28
9. "No One's Gonna Do It for You (Acoustic)" – 3:21
10. "Set It Off (Acoustic)" – 6:23
