= Viva La Bands, Volume 2 =

Compilation album by various artists
- Released: September 4, 2007
- Genre: Rock, metal

Various artists chronology
Viva La Bands (2005)	Viva La Bands, Volume 2 (2007)

Viva La Bands, Volume 2 is the second music compilation album by professional skateboarder and television personality Bam Margera, released on September 4, 2007. It features songs from some of Margera's favorite artists. The majority of tracks on the album could originally only be found on this disc, with a selection of the songs not released on a studio album to date.

== Track listing ==
A * indicates tracks that were recorded exclusively for this album.

1. Clutch – "King of Arizona"*
2. In Flames – "Abnegation"
3. Children of Bodom – "Tie My Rope"*
4. CKY – "Rio Bravo" (Remix)*
5. The Sounds – "Ego"
6. Shiny Toy Guns – "Rocketship"
7. Bloodhound Gang – "Screwing You on the Beach at Night"
8. Gwar – "War Is All We Know"
9. The 69 Eyes – "Shadow of Your Love"
10. Priestess – "Lay Down"
11. Dimmu Borgir – "The Serpentine Offering"
12. Kill Hannah – "Believer"
13. Viking Skull – "Blackened Sunrise"*
14. Vains of Jenna – "Enemy in Me"*
15. A Life Once Lost – "Firewater Joyride"
16. Revolution Mother – "Come On"
17. Melody Club – "Take Me Away"
18. The Thieves – "Vacant Thoughts"
19. Malevolent Creation – "Buried in a Nameless Grave"
20. Gnarkill – "Dico at the Piano Bar"

=== Bonus DVD ===
Just like the previous album, Volume 1, Volume 2 was released with a bonus DVD. It contains some of the featured song's music videos and unseen footage of stunts performed by Margera and his crew. In an interview, Margera has referred to this bonus disc as being the closest thing to CKY5.

== Tour ==
Coinciding with the release of the CD, there was a tour headlined by Cradle of Filth, Gwar, CKY, and Vains of Jenna. The tour lasted from September 24 to November 3, 2007, and took place all around the United States.

CKY quit the tour after lead singer Deron Miller left the band, and Chad Ginsburg broke his foot and ribs while on tour.
