= Headstunts =

Studio album by The Datsuns
- Released: 6 October 2008
- Genre: Hard rock, punk rock, garage rock revival
- Label: Cooking Vinyl
- Producer: The Datsuns

The Datsuns chronology
Smoke & Mirrors (2006)	Headstunts (2008)

Professional ratings
Review scores
Source	Rating
Allmusic	3.5/5 stars
This Is Fake DIY	(5/10)
Q	(October 2008)

Headstunts is The Datsuns' fourth studio album, released on 6 October 2008. It was recorded in early 2008 in Sweden and was self-produced. It is the first album The Datsuns recorded with new drummer Ben Cole.

The title of the album, Headstunts is an anagram of the band's name.

== Track listing ==
All tracks are written, performed, and produced by The Datsuns.

No.	Title	Length
1.	"Human Error"	2:16
2.	"Hey! Paranoid People! (What's In Your Head?"	4:39
3.	"Your Bones"	2:28
4.	"Ready, Set, Go!"	3:02
5.	"Yeah, Yeah, Just Another Mistake"	3:06
6.	"Eye of the Needle"	5:52
7.	"So Long"	2:07
8.	"Cruel Cruel Fate"	3:18
9.	"Highschool Hoodlums"	2:32
10.	"Cry Crybaby"	2:38
11.	"Pity Pity Please"	3:29
12.	"Somebody Better"	7:59
Total length:		41:29
