= Safe Forever =

Single by Gyroscope

from the album Sound Shattering Sound
- A-side: "Safe Forever"
- B-side: "Misery (Acoustic)", "Sharp Words (Live)"
- Released: 15 March 2004
- Genre: Alternative rock
- Length: 3:42
- Label: Festival Mushroom Records
- Songwriters: Daniel Sanders, Rob Nassif, Brad Campbell, Zoran Trivic
- Producer: Shaun O'Callaghan

Gyroscope singles chronology
"Safe Forever" (2004)	"Take This For Granted" (2004)

"Safe Forever" is the first single from Australian four-piece Gyroscope's debut album Sound Shattering Sound. It was released on 15 March 2004 along with a music video. The first B-side to the single was a fully acoustic version of "Misery", also from Sound Shattering Sound. The second B-side was a live version of "Sharp Words", from the band's 2003 EP, Midnight Express, and was recorded at the Amplifier Bar in Perth, Western Australia on 19 July 2003. The video was directed by Matt Weston, and won a Silver Australian Cinematographers Society (ACS) Award in 2004.

The song peaked at number 65 on the Australian singles charts and reached number 97 on Triple J's Hottest 100 of 2004.

Lead vocalist Daniel Sanders describes that "this came about and was inspired pretty much on Zok's [Zoran Trivic] main lead riff. It sounded kick ass so yeah it went from there. Wrote the lyrics mainly about feeling content. Not just relationship-wise but in general. Feeling uber-lucky too. I f**king love playing this mother live."

Guitarist Zoran Trivic in a subsequent interview states "With the no bullshit intro riff and the hollow verses, we were able to make that quiet/loud thing happen – that ‘thing’ we learnt from listening to too much grunge in the ‘90s." "Dan's [Daniel Sanders] and Brad's [Brad Campbell] vocals complement each other quite radly, and with some solid drum-filling and a bit of face-melting we probably created our greatest ode to one of our favourite bands (At The Drive-In), as well our very first tune on our very first album."

"Safe Forever" has been described as "start(ing) off focused around a little guitar lick which slowly works its way through its verses, building into a heavier chorus with the usual driving power chords."

Sanders when queried on the origins of "Misery" advised "For some reason after playing a show with a couple ska bands - I came up with this tune - at like 3am." In another interview he stated that "It was written the same day Michael Jeffrey Jordan retired from the National Basketball Association."

== Track listing ==
All tracks are written by Daniel Sanders, Brad Campbell, Rob Nassif, Zoran Trivic

Sound Shattering Sound
No.	Title	Length
1.	"Safe Forever"	3:41
2.	"Misery" (Acoustic)	4:21
3.	"Sharp Words" (Live)	3:57
