= Gyroscope (band) =

Australian rock band

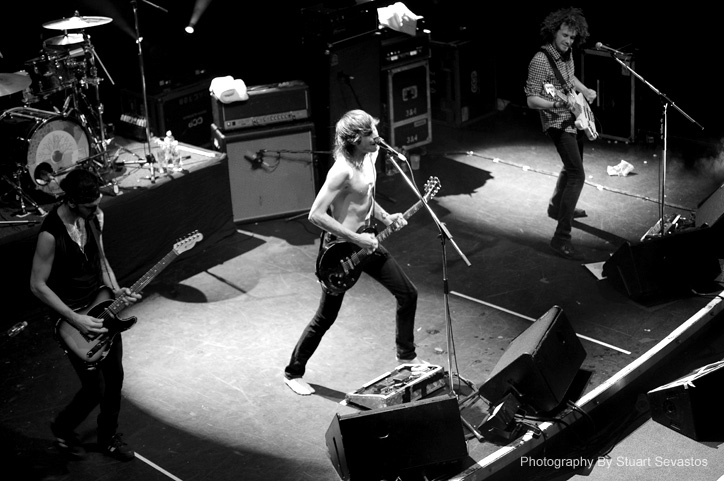
- Gyroscope performin at Metro City in Perth, June 2010

Background information
- Also known as: Gyroscope Sunday
- Origin: Perth, Western Australia, Australia
- Genres: Rock; indie; grunge; punk; emo
- Years active: 1997–present
- Labels: Skullery Records; Island; Warner; Festival Mushroom; Redline
- Members: Daniel Sanders; Zoran Trivic; Brad Campbell; Sim Dreja
- Past members: Carl Maiorana; Kim Pengilly; Rob Nassif
- Website: gyroscope.band

Gyroscope are an Australian rock band from Perth, which formed in 1997 as Gyroscope Sunday. The members are Daniel Sanders as lead vocalist and on guitar, Zoran Trivic on guitar and backing vocals, Brad Campbell on bass guitar and backing vocals and Rob Nassif on drums. As of 2014 the group has released four studio albums on major labels.

Gyroscope's first major label album, Sound Shattering Sound, was released in June 2004 – seven years after formation. It peaked at No. 37 on the ARIA Albums Chart. Their second such album, Are You Involved?, was issued in September 2005, which debuted at No. 20. It was followed by a double A-sided single, "Fast Girl / Beware Wolf", both tracks polled on the national radio station Triple J's Hottest 100 in 2005. The band's rise in popularity continued with their third album, Breed Obsession, which appeared in March 2008 and peaked at No. 1. It was nominated for 'Best Rock Album' at the ARIA Music Awards of 2008. It was released through Warner Music Australasia and provided four singles, including "Snakeskin" (No. 30 on the ARIA Singles Chart and listed at No. 16 on Triple J's Hottest 100 in 2007) and the anthem, "Australia". The band's fourth album, Cohesion, was released in April 2010, which reached No. three and included the singles, "Some of the Places I Know" and "Baby I'm Getting Better", which charted at No. 32 and No. 34, respectively.

== History ==
=== Early years ===
Gyroscope are an Australian rock group which started as Gyroscope Sunday in Beechboro a suburb in Perth, Western Australia in 1997, with Rob Nassif on drums, Carl Maiorana and then Kim Pengilly on bass guitar, Daniel Sanders on guitar and lead vocals, and Zoran Trivic on guitar and backing vocals. Trivic and Nassif had started jamming together and found Sanders through mutual friends. Gyroscope Sunday issued a five-track cassette, First..., in 1998.

By May 1998 Pengilly was replaced by Brad Campbell on bass guitar and backing vocals. Trivic and Campbell had attended the same secondary school. At that time they had formed a garage band and performed covers of Nirvana and Foo Fighters. Trivic later recalled "this was a way of learning our individual instruments as we were always about starting our own band – it was just gunna take some time."

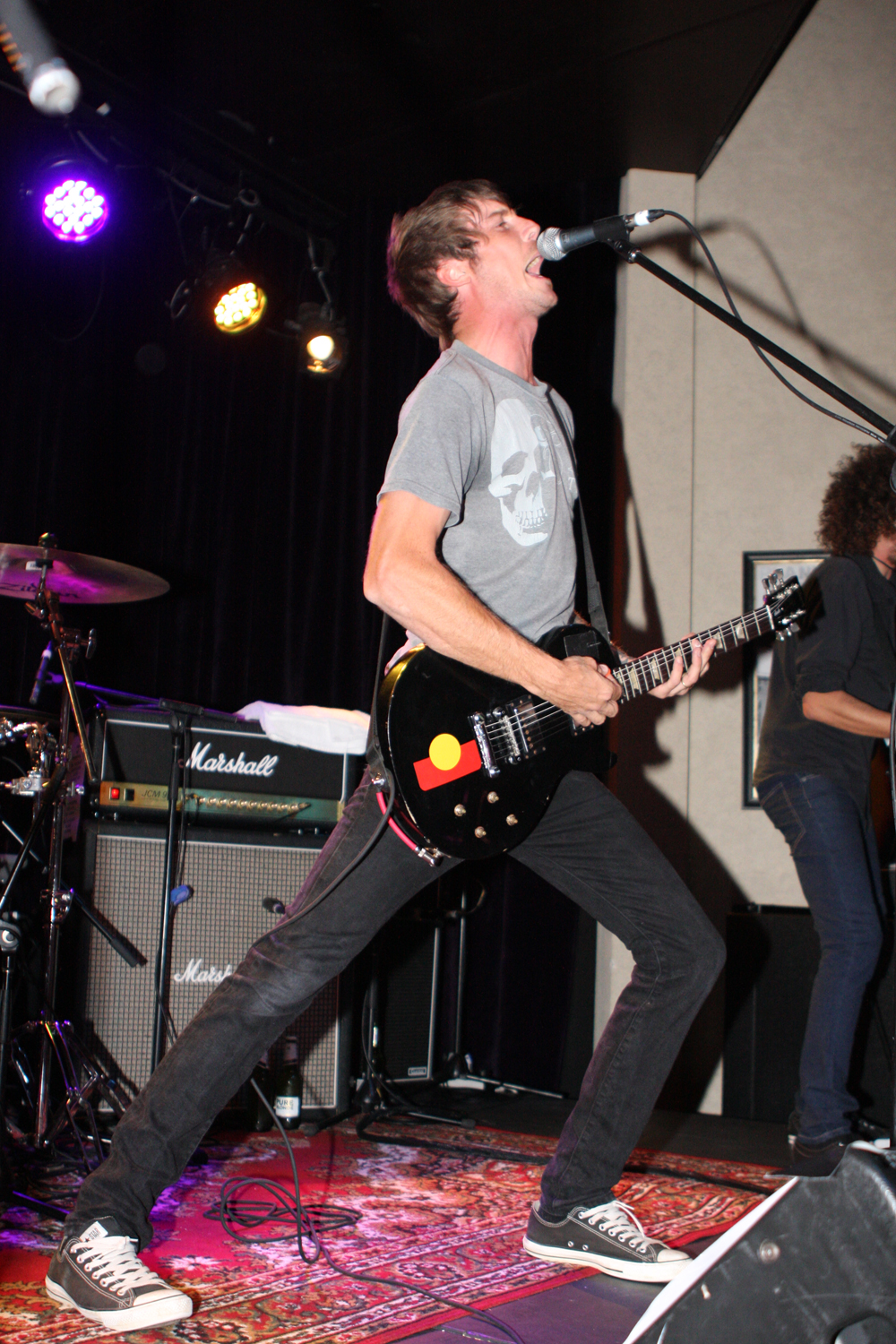
Gyroscope's Daniel Sanders on guitar and lead vocals, The Star, Sydney, March 2012

In late 1998 as Gyroscope, with the line-up of Campbell, Nassif, Sanders and Trivic, recorded eight tracks which were released on a compact cassette, Gyroscope Demo, in June 1999, with only 500 copies made. While performing on the Perth live circuit the members also had work or school commitments. The band provided support slots for Reel Big Fish (October 1999), Toe to Toe and 28 Days (December), Millencolin (February 2000), The Living End, Unwritten Law.

Two independent extended plays, Scalectrix (April 2000) and Means to an End were recorded and issued on cassette in 2000, where the former also appeared on CD. From December 2000 the band went on a six-month hiatus when Nassif travelled to Canada to study. Both EPs were combined on cassette, in April 2001 (originally available in four different covers), as Injuring Yourself Whilst Making Music.

Upon Nassif's return in June 2001, the group signed with Redline Records, owned by fellow Perth rockers, Jebediah, and they supported that band on an Australian tour. Gyroscope's first release for Redline was another EP, Take Time (May 2002). In October that year Juice Magazine named them as one of the next big things along with The Vines, Jet and The Datsuns. At the end of 2002 Gyroscope won a WAMi Award for "Most Popular Local Original Punk Act".

Gyroscope signed with Festival Mushroom Records at the beginning of 2003. On 3 February that year, with Jedediah, they supported a gig by international headliners Jimmy Eat World at The Globe, Prahran East. Gyroscope issued two more EPs in that year: Midnight Express in May – which contained the live favourite "Fire Away". Driving for the Storm / Doctor Doctor followed in September, and received airplay on Triple J radio across Australia. "Doctor Doctor" was listed at No. 92 on the station's Hottest 100 for that year.

=== Sound Shattering Sound ===
2004 was Gyroscope's breakthrough year. They supported international visitors including Blink-182, Brand New, Thursday, Dashboard Confessional (their lead singer, Chris Carrabba, insisted that they open for his group upon hearing Gyroscope's EP), Sparta, Saves the Day and The Get Up Kids. A new single, "Safe Forever", came out in March 2004 and earned Gyroscope more mainstream exposure, it peaked in the top 100 of the ARIA Singles Chart.

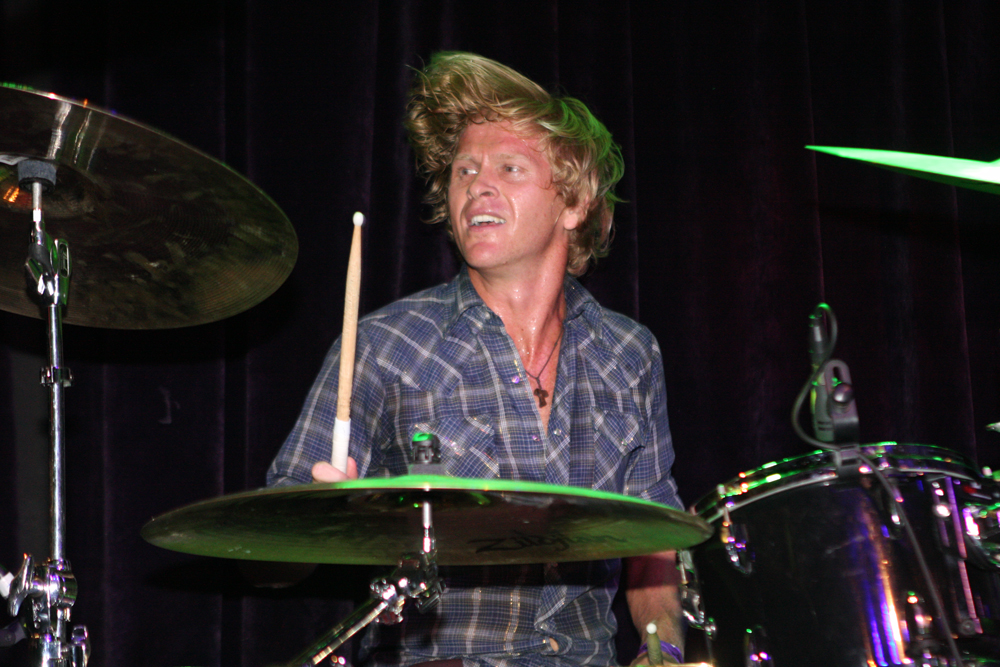
Rob Nassif on drums, March 2012

Their first studio album for Festival Mushroom Records, Sound Shattering Sound, was released on 14 June 2004. It debuted at No. 37 on the ARIA Albums Chart in the following week—a culmination of seven years' work while consolidating their live following. It combined newer material with tracks from their previous two EPs and "Safe Forever".

Andrew Murfett of The Age felt it was "an assured release full of crunchy riffs and emotive lyrics." FasterLouder's Josie9 felt that older tracks "like 'Doctor Doctor', 'Driving for the Storm' and newie 'Confidence in Confidentiality' are excellent indicators of the bands live sound, with contrasting heavy/soft guitars thanks to guitarist Zoran Trivic, trade off vocals/screams courtesy of singer/guitarist Dan Sanders and Brad Campbell (Bass/vox) and thumping drums from Rob Nassif". In support of its release Gyroscope commenced their first headlining tour of Australia. Sanders described difficulties while touring and trying to maintain relationships, but noted an advantage: "I could be away for seven weeks and write some of my better lyrics because I'm missing a girl or mates."

=== Are You Involved? ===
In May 2005, Gyroscope recorded their second album, Are You Involved?, in Los Angeles with Mark Trombino (Jimmy Eat World, Drive Like Jehu, Finch, The Living End, Blink-182) as producer and engineer. During the sessions, they filmed a music video for one side of the album's first single, "Fast Girl" (March 2006), in Death Valley. Trivic described their sound "I hope people get chills when they listen to it! ... It has the same core elements [as on] the last record, yet this record pushes our musical boundaries a lil further." Sanders felt one should not "focus on lyrics or the ins and outs of our songwriting but just enjoy."

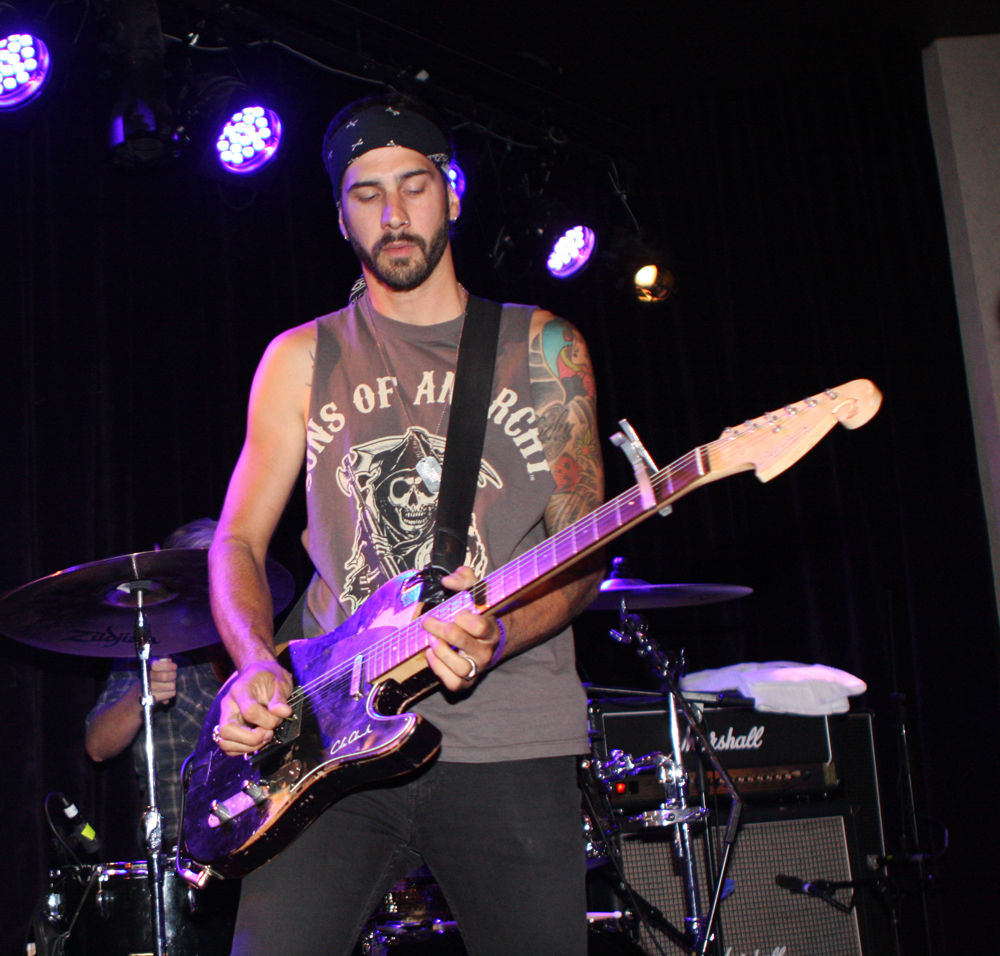
Zoran Trivic on guitar, March 2012

Are You Involved? was released on 25 September 2005, which peaked at No. 20 on the ARIA Albums Chart. Initial copies had a bonus DVD featuring 'making of' documentaries for both the album and the "Fast Girl" video. FasterLouder's Kellanator opined that their "lyrics cut you when you least expect it. Their whirling sounds take you on a journey. This isn't just music... the band have grown and shifted a little since their last release... [they] have the knack of writing a good meaningful song with delicious pop hooks. Best combination ever." Bemused on Punknews.org website noted that Trombino had "[helped] achieve a fuller, more realized sound than on previous recordings" and the album "has the ability to gradually work its way into your mindset with a lyric or vocal delivery here and a guitar line there."

During 2005 it was nominated for the inaugural J Award – Triple J's Australian Album of the Year. Two tracks, "Fast Girl" and "Beware Wolf", were listed, at No. 29 and No. 62 respectively, on that year's Hottest 100. "Fast Girl" was nominated at the ARIA Music Awards of 2006 for Breakthrough Artist – Single; and the band also received two WAMi Awards in 2006 for "Best Rock Act" and "Best Punk Act". "Beware Wolf" has been used on the Australian soap opera, Home and Away.

=== Breed Obsession ===
Following a successful tour of South Africa, Gyroscope recorded their third major label studio album, Breed Obsession, in Liverpool during mid-2007. Dave Eringa (Idlewild, Manic Street Preachers) produced the material while mixing occurred in London. In September that year Gyroscope toured Australia supporting Fall Out Boy on that group's Australian leg of their Friends or Enemies Tour.

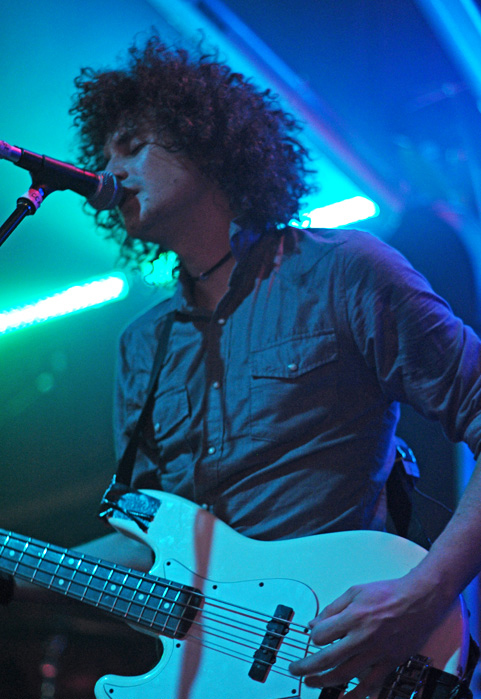
Brad Campbell on bass guitar and backing vocals, Amplifier Bar, Perth, January 2010.

The first single from Breed Obsession, "Snakeskin", appeared in October 2007, which debuted at No. 30 on the ARIA singles chart. It was the number-one most voted video on JTV, number-one most requested track on Triple J's Super Request, and was ranked No. 16 on Triple J's Hottest 100 for 2007. The music video for "Snakeskin" was shot in Wiltshire, near Stonehenge, south of London. It has the band playing in a 200-metre crop circle – made specifically for the video. This was the same farm where Led Zeppelin's crop circle was made, which features on the cover of that group's Remasters compilation album (October 1990).

Gyroscope performed at the Big Day Out festival, which toured Australia and New Zealand in late January and early February 2008. Rhythmelody at FasterLouder caught their performance at the Claremont Showground on 3 February, "they let loose a fantastic set filled with old tracks from Gyroscope's younger years, tracks which long time supporters and new fans alike soaked up." Later that month the band released the second single from the album, "1981", which peaked in the top 100.

Breed Obsession was issued on 8 March 2008, which debuted at No. 1 on the ARIA Albums Chart, the highest debut in the band's history and the first Australian artists' number-one album or single for fifteen weeks. AllMusic's Stewart Mason found that they "shake off their always tenuous connection to punk and reveal themselves to be a mainstream pop/rock band with few musical aspirations further than a handful of FM radio hits" and summarised that it was "generically tasty, but full of meaningless empty calories." By August that year the album was certified gold by ARIA for shipment of 35,000 units.

In May 2008 Gyroscope released a music video for "Australia". It was filmed in Sydney and directed by Tom Sparks. "Australia" appeared as the next single in the following month, which peaked at No. 52. At the ARIA Music Awards of 2008 Breed Obsession was nominated for Best Rock Album. The fourth single, "These Days", appeared in November that year.

=== Cohesion ===
Following a national tour supporting The Living End, Gyroscope began writing for their fourth studio album, Cohesion. The band had 25 songs prior to sorting out the final track list. They signed with Island Records Australia and from September 2009 Gil Norton (Pixies, Maxïmo Park, Foo Fighters) produced their sessions at Rockfield Studios, in Monmouth, Wales. On 16 October 2009 in an interview with Triple J, Sanders announced that the record would be completed by mid-November. He also said that they were considering a self-titled album.

In December 2009 the group revealed a track from the album, "Live Without You", for radio spots and as an album teaser, on their MySpace page. The first single from the album, "Some of the Places I Know", was released in March 2010, which peaked at No. 32. The music video had appeared in February. Cohesion followed on 9 April 2010, which debuted at No. 3. Mike Allen at SputnikMusic described it as "straightforward rock... [it] is keen on its utilization of blistering riffs, incongruent dynamics, and Daniel Sanders' soaring clean vocals, all of which play an intricate role in creating the melting pot. Monstrous choruses and infectious hooks are strewn throughout." In June they started their national tour to promote the album.

=== 2010–2014 ===
On 22 April 2010 the band blogged on their official MySpace page that Warner Music were due to release a compilation album, Best of Gyroscope, on 7 May via iTunes, without the band's permission. They only found out about the compilation through their fans on Facebook. The band issued a joint statement through their management, criticising Warner for not consulting them. They declared, "The song selection, artwork and everything about this release has been done without consultation with the band. Gyroscope are a band who have always put our fans first. In our opinion, the release of this album without consultation with the band, and without including any material from our new album Cohesion, does not represent good value for our fans." The album was released anyway. The album has since been removed from iTunes and recalled from stores.

In May 2011 they performed at the annual Groovin' the Moo festival at regional centres in Australia.

In May 2012, Trivic broke both legs when he was struck by a car whilst riding his motorcycle. Initially it was anticipated that his recovery would only take three to four months however his rehabilitation took longer. As a result, the band went into an enforced hiatus until December 2014 when they recommenced live performances with a national tour to celebrate the tenth anniversary of the release of their debut album, Sound Shattering Sound.

=== 2015–2016 ===
In May 2015 Gyroscope played a secret show at The Hen House studios to celebrate the Hen House's 5th birthday. In February 2016 the band announced a one off show at the Prince of Wales Hotel in Bunbury over the Easter weekend. On 3 March 2016 the band posted a photo of rehearsals on Facebook announcing that they were working on some new songs.

=== Crooked Thought / DABS ===
In 2017 the band released a double A side called "Crooked Thought / DABS" and did a national tour to celebrate the release in January 2018. Recorded at Blackbird Studios in Perth by Dave Parkin.

=== 4YRLV ===
The summer of 2018 saw the band head back into Blackbird Studios again with Parkin behind the desk. They ended up recording a session which would sit on their shelves for a good year or so gathering dust. On Friday 13 September 2019 they released worldwide 3 tracks from this studio stint in the form of an EP, titled 4YRLV. They are; title track '4YRLV', 'I Am The Night' and 'Bloodstreams'.

=== 2025-present ===
In November 2025, Gyroscope released the single My Broken Spine - their first release since 2019, the first release through their recording studio the Skullery, and the first with drummer Sim Dreja. The band also announced they would celebrate the single with an Australia-wide tour in early 2026.

== Other projects ==
Gyroscope members have been involved in side projects and extraneous business ventures.

Sanders and Campbell performed in a Nirvana tribute band, Nirvanarama, its other members were Chris Daymond (Jebediah) on guitar and Drew Goddard (Karnivool lead guitarist) on drums. Nirvanarama played its inaugural show at the Rocket Room venue in Perth at the Smells like Christmas Spirit, Christmas party. They played another set of tribute shows in December 2013.

The support act were Dead Glorious, a street punk group which includes Gyroscope guitarist, Trivic, together with Fergus Deasy (Little Birdy), Matt Pirga (The Reserves) and Matthew Radich (The Critics).

Gyroscope frontman Sanders also started a band in mid 2014, called 'Heard Of Cows?', with two members of Karnivool. The lineup consists of Sanders on vocals/guitar, Jono Stockman (Karnivool bassist) on bass/vocals and Drew Goddard (Karnivool lead guitarist) on drums/vocals. Bands they have played alongside include the Meat Puppets, Brant Bjork, the Hard-Ons, Förstöra.

Nassif purchased a rehearsal studio, Hen House Rehearsal Studios, in May 2010 in Osborne Park. It is the same location where Gyroscope had written four of their albums. Nassif described this venue as "a place where bands and musicians can hang out with friends, create amazing music and have fun." Artists which have rehearsed there include Jebediah, Drapht, Kryptonics, Wrath of Fenrir and Monument.

In the Aussie winter of 2018, Sanders revealed a solo project called XIII (pron. 'thirteen') and released the debut album titled Bloody Banks of the Swan. Wanting to play these songs live, Sanders (vocals/guitar) enlisted old mates Mykal Deville (bass/vocals) and Drew Goddard (drums/vocals). On 2 March 2019 they played their debut show and filmed parts of a super 8 music video for "I Want An Axe To Break The Ice" at Perth City Limits Festival @ Badlands Bar, Perth.

2018 saw Campbell, Sanders and Trivic build their own purpose built recording studio called The Skullery. Situated in their hometown of Perth in a suburb called Malaga, in a recent interview with Alice Cooper they mentioned that "The Skullery is a legends only creative space."

== Reflections ==
Nassif, as part of his ownership and management of The Hen House Rehearsal Studios, continues to update a section entitled "Ideas" on the business' website as of November 2012. Nassif has used the blog to provide advice for newer musicians and bands with reflections from his time with Gyroscope. In a post entitled, "It's not the most talented bands that make it. It's the most persistent!", Nassif explains that Gyroscope recorded its debut album seven years after formation and that a significant contributing factor to the maintenance of the band, as well as other bands, was the equal apportioning of songwriting royalties to all band members:

I think this is incredibly important for young bands because it sets the tone for everyone's roles with in the band. It encourages the members who may not be contributing to the song writing to make sure they contribute in other areas. Such as running the Facebook pages, sourcing the merchandise designs, booking gigs and organising the rehearsal studio. It means picking up any slack, so that even if your not directly involved with the songwriting your still pushing the band forward with your other responsibilities. Great songs alone will not get your band to where you want to go unless your doing all the smaller things really well too.

On 3 November 2012, Nassif uploaded a post entitled "3 Reasons Your Band Should Play More Live Shows!", in which he reveals that "Gyroscope has never earned a cent from any of our 4 album releases."

== Members ==
=== Current ===
- Daniel Sanders – lead vocals, rhythm guitar (1997–present)
- Zoran Trivic – lead guitar, backing vocals (1997–present)
- Brad Campbell – bass guitar, unclean vocals (1998–present)
- Sim Dreja – drums (2020–present)

=== Former ===
- Carl Maiorana – bass guitar (1997)
- Kim Pengilly – bass guitar (1997–1998)
- Rob Nassif – drums (1997-2019)

== Discography ==
- 2004: Sound Shattering Sound
- 2005: Are You Involved?
- 2008: Breed Obsession
- 2010: Cohesion

== Awards and nominations ==
=== APRA Awards ===
The APRA Awards are presented annually from 1982 by the Australasian Performing Right Association (APRA), "honouring composers and songwriters". They commenced in 1982.

Year	Nominee / work	Award	Result	Ref.
2011	"Baby I'm Getting Better" (Daniel Sanders, Robert Nassif, Brad Campbell, Zoran Trivic)	Rock Work of the Year	Nominated	

=== ARIA Music Awards ===
The ARIA Music Awards have been presented since 1987, Gyroscope have received two nominations.

Year	Nominee / work	Award	Result
2006	"Fast Girl"	Breakthrough Artist – Single	Nominated
2008	Breed Obsession	Best Rock Album	Nominated

=== Channel [V] Awards ===
- 2008 Channel V–Rock Artist of the Year

=== J Award ===
The J Awards are an annual series of Australian music awards that were established by the Australian Broadcasting Corporation's youth-focused radio station Triple J. They commenced in 2005.

Year	Nominee / work	Award	Result
2005	Are You Involved?	Australian Album of the Year	Nominated

=== WAMi Awards ===
The West Australian Music Industry Awards (WAMi Awards) have been presented by the Western Australian Music Industry Association since 1994. Gyroscope have received seventeen nominations and have won nine times.

Year	Nominee / work	Award	Result
2002	Gyroscope	Most Popular Local Original Punk Act	Won
2003	Gyroscope	Most Popular Local Original Act	Nominated
2003	Gyroscope	Most Popular Local Original Indie Rock Act	Nominated
2003	Zoran Trivic	Most Popular Original Guitarist	Nominated
2005	Gyroscope	Best Punk Act	Won
2006	Gyroscope	Most Popular Live Act	Won
2006	Gyroscope	Best Rock Act	Won
2006	Gyroscope	Best Punk Act	Won
2006	Are You Involved?	Most Popular Album	Won
2007	Rob Nassif	Best Drummer	Won
2008	"Snakeskin"	Best Popular Single/EP	Won
2008	"Snakeskin"	Best Popular Music Video	Won
2008	Gyroscope	Most Popular Live Act	Nominated
2009	Gyroscope	Most Popular Live Act	Nominated
2010	Gyroscope	Most Popular Act	Nominated
2010	Gyroscope	Best Commercial Pop Act	Nominated
2011	Gyroscope	Most Popular Live Act	Nominated
