= Injuring Yourself Whilst Making Music =

Injuring Yourself Whilst Making Music EP

EP by Gyroscope
- Released: April 2001
- Genre: Post-grunge
- Label: Independent

Gyroscope chronology
Means to an End (2000)	Injuring Yourself Whilst Making Music EP (2001)	Take Time (2002)

Injuring Yourself Whilst Making Music
- Alternative green cover

Injuring Yourself Whilst Making Music is the third release by Gyroscope and was released April 2001. The compilation was recorded at Perth, Western Australia's Revolver Studios Couch with producers Laurie Sinagra and Gav Tempany.

"The cassette was essentially a compilation of both the Gyroscope EPs of the 2000/2001 era. Scalectrix was pressed on compact disc and released in April 2000 Means to an End (loosely titled the 'end of an era' sessions) was recorded in December/January 2001, yet never saw release. The decision to compile this cassette was made in order to tie the loose ends of a graded era and sow the seeds for a new". - Gyroscope web site

The cassette was released with four different coloured covers - green, red, yellow and purple. Only a limited run of 500 copies was produced.

== Track listing ==
All songs written by D. Sanders, Z. Trivic, R. Nassif and B. Campbell

1. "Means to an End"
2. "Rhetorical Question"
3. "The Final Say"
4. "His Word against Mine"
5. "Insanity"
6. "Skill Degree"
7. "Scalectrix"
8. "S4"
9. "Half your Problem"
