= Outta Sight/Outta Mind =

Studio album by The Datsuns
- Released: 7 June 2004
- Recorded: November 2003–March 2004
- Genres: Hard rock, garage rock revival
- Length: 40:40
- Labels: V2 Records, Hellsquad Records
- Producer: John Paul Jones

The Datsuns chronology
| The Datsuns (2002) | Outta Sight/Outta Mind (2004) | Stuck Here for Days (2006) |

Professional ratings
Aggregate scores
| Source | Rating |
|---|---|
| Album of the Year | 52/100 |
| Metacritic | 47/100 |
Review scores
| Source | Rating |
| AllMusic | 2/5 stars |
| DIY | 4.5/5 stars |
| The Guardian | 2/5 stars |
| The New Zealand Herald | 2/5 stars |
| NME | 4/10 |
| Now | 4/5 stars |
| Pitchfork | 4/10 |
| Q | 3/5 stars |
| Spin | D |
| Uncut | 3/5 stars |

Outta Sight/Outta Mind is the second album by New Zealand rock band The Datsuns, released on 7 June 2004. It was preceded by the release of the single "Blacken My Thumb". This was followed by one more single, "Girls Best Friend". The album was produced by John Paul Jones, best known as the bass guitarist of the rock band Led Zeppelin.

== Track listing ==
All songs written by The Datsuns.

1. "Blacken My Thumb" - 2:46
2. "That Sure Ain't Right" – 2:54
3. "Girls Best Friend" – 2:49
4. "Messin' Around" – 3:39
5. "Cherry Lane" – 3:13
6. "Get Up! (Don't Fight It)" – 2:28
7. "Hong Kong Fury" – 3:49
8. "What I've Lost" – 4:02
9. "You Can't Find Me" – 3:12
10. "Don't Come Knocking" – 3:05
11. "Lucille" – 3:15
12. "I Got No Words" – 5:20

== Charts ==
| Chart (2004) | Peak position |
|---|---|
| Australian Albums (ARIA) | 41 |
| Dutch Albums (Album Top 100) | 98 |
| French Albums (SNEP) | 119 |
| New Zealand Albums (RMNZ) | 7 |
| Scottish Albums (Official Charts) | 49 |
| UK Albums (Official Charts) | 58 |
| UK Independent Albums (Official Charts) | 4 |
