= The Petty Thefts =

German rock music group

- Origin: Ulm, Germany
- Genres: chamber pop Indie Rock
- Years active: 2006-present
- Label: Klangbad
- Members: Frank Wegling; Andrew McGinn; Katrin Holzapfel; Milorad Carkic
- Past members: Les Wegling; Sehera Nawaz; Dorothea Münsch
- Website: Official Website

The Petty Thefts is an indie rock band based in Berlin, Germany. The band is centered on the songwriting duo of Frank Wegling (vocals, guitar) from Cleveland, Ohio, and Andrew McGinn (vocals) from Bournemouth, UK. Other band members consist of bassist Milorad Carkic, keyboardist/vocalist/percussionist Katrin Holzapfel.

The band is known for their diverse, energetic, theatrical performances and quirky costumes. Drawing from their multi-national background, their sound is a mixture indie rock, britpop and baroque pop.

== History ==
The Petty Thefts formed quickly after a chance meeting of Wegling and McGinn in 2006, with Wegling soon relocating to Ulm, Germany, to focus on the band. Soon after, the band was seen performing by Faust keyboardist's Hans Joachim Irmler, who then signed them to Klangbad label.

The band have performed regularly in southern Germany, Berlin and Leipzig. They have also performed at Obstwiesen , Ulmer Zelt and Donaubeben festivals. They have achieved critical acclaim in local newspapers and press. The song Last Waltz (3 Minute Edit), from ´Smoke and Mirrors´, was included in a catwalk setlist for London Fashion Week.

The band were enlisted in April 2009 to play as part of a citywide block out of possible gathering places for extreme right Neo-Fascists, during the Germany's annual Far right May Day marches.

The band's debut album Smoke & Mirrors, produced by Hans Joachim Irmler at faust-studios, was released 3 July 2009.

== Discography ==
=== Albums ===
- Smoke & Mirrors (2009)
