= Vains of Jenna =

Swedish rock band

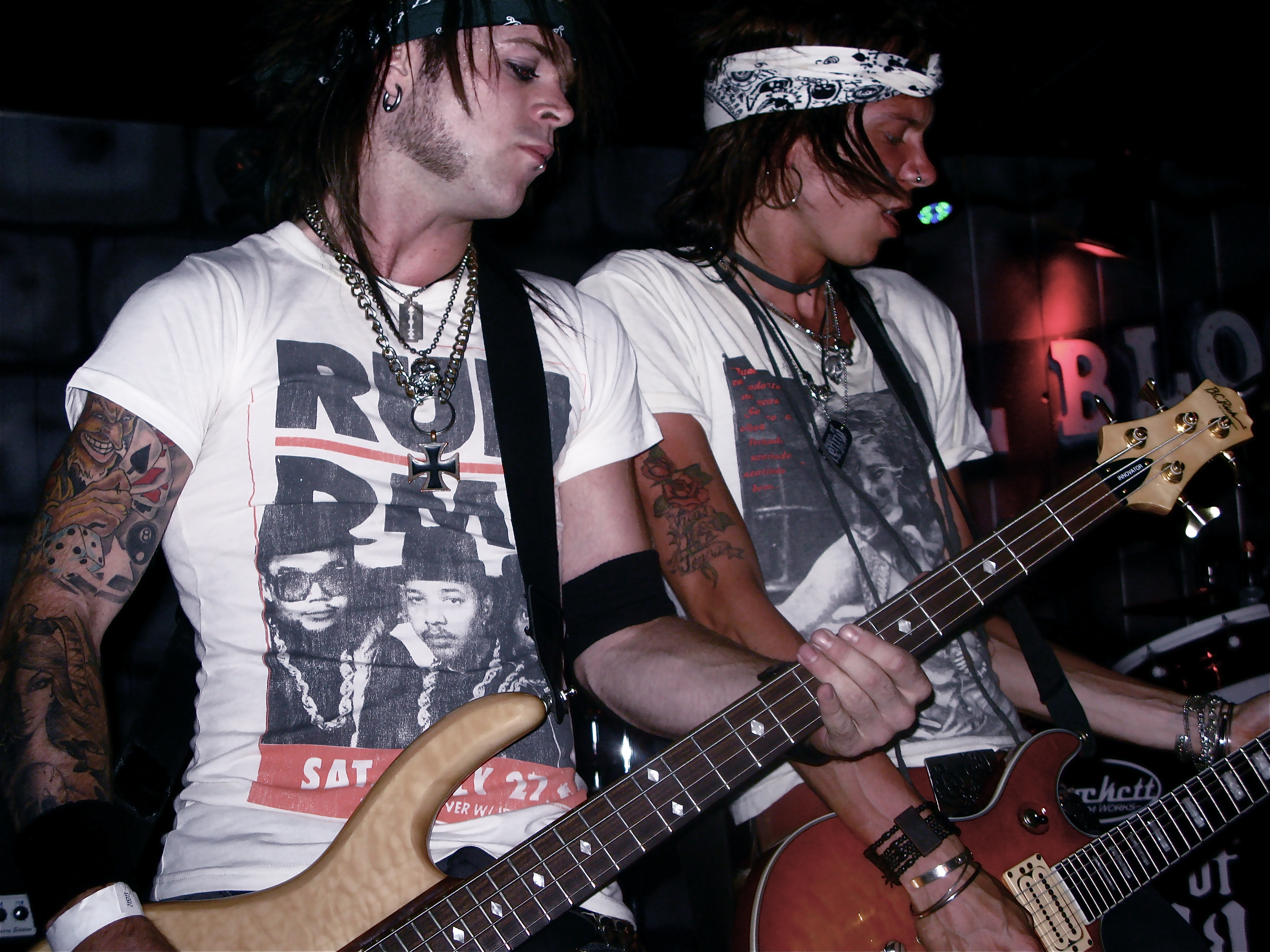
- JP White & Nicki Kin in 2008

Background information
- Origin: Falkenberg, Sweden
- Genres: Sleaze rock, hard rock, glam metal
- Years active: 2005–2012
- Labels: RLS/Raw Noise, Filthy Note, Cleopatra, Fontana, Ferret
- Past members: Lizzy DeVine; JP White; Nicki Kin; Jacki Stone; Jesse Forte; Joel Eliasson; Anton Sevholt

Vains of Jenna was a Swedish sleaze rock band formed in Falkenberg in 2005. They later moved to Los Angeles, though most of the band members now reside back in Sweden. In January 2012, the band confirmed on Facebook and MySpace that they had "mutually and amicably" decided to disband.

== History ==
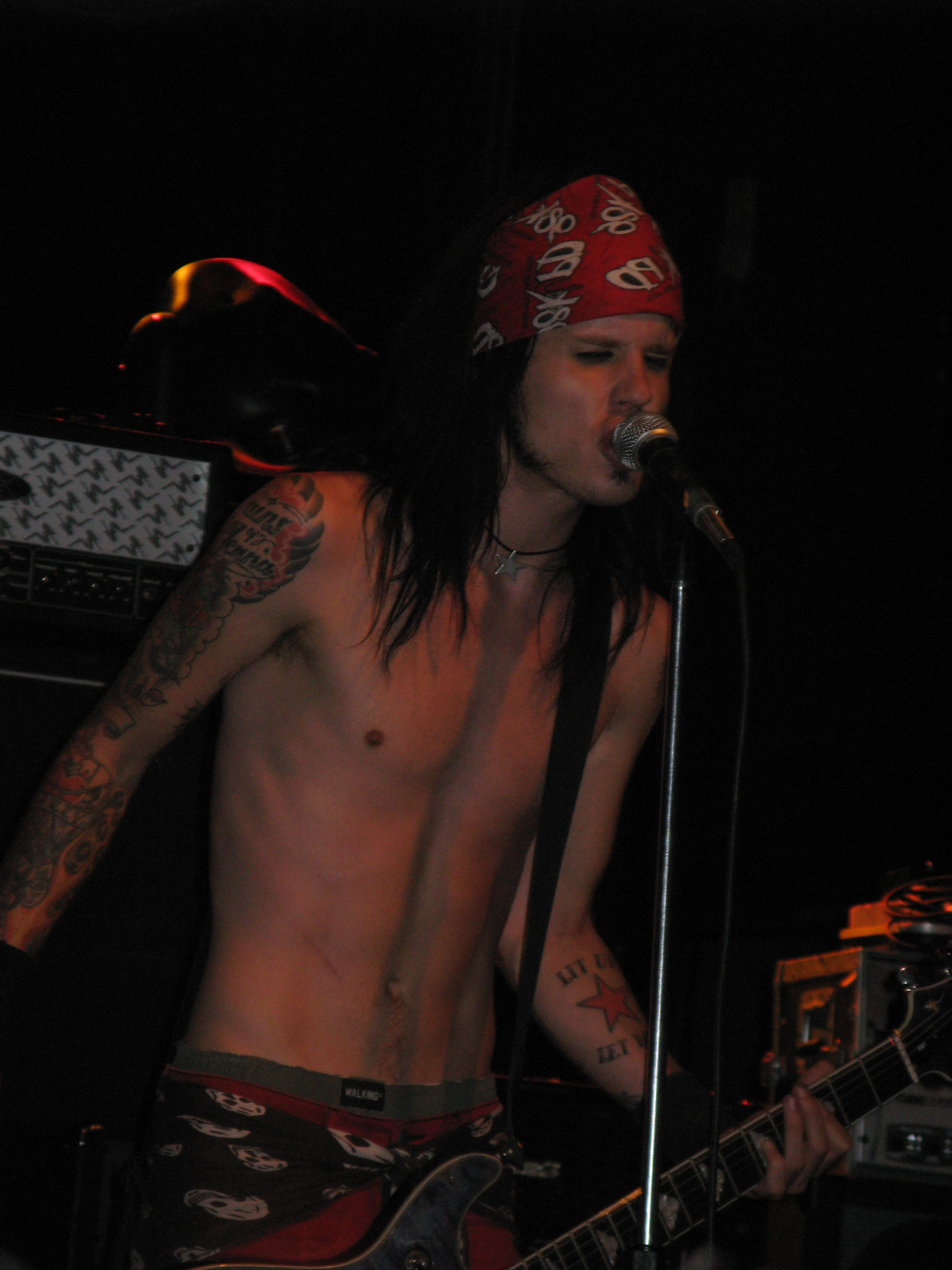
Lizzy DeVine on the 2007 "Viva La Bands Tour"

Vains of Jenna was formed by four young men from Sweden in January 2005. At that time, the two youngest members of the band were 18 years old. In early February, and with only one song recorded, they were offered a chance to play at Crüe Fest Hollywood in July of the same year. The band accepted and traveled to California for the show, bringing with them a four-song demo containing "No One's Gonna Do It for You", "Hard to Be Vain", "Heartbreak Suicide", and "A.S.A.D.". "Heartbreak Suicide" ended up becoming the band's most popular song at the time.

Vains of Jenna captured the attention of Stevie Rachelle (Tuff singer, and the owner of hard rock website Metal Sludge) during their first ever performance in America, playing at the Whisky a Go Go in Hollywood during the charity event Crüe Fest Hollywood. Rachelle offered the band a demo deal and a manager's contract 48 hours later. Rachelle booked the band to record at Redrum Studios with his friend former Guns N' Roses guitarist Gilby Clarke producing. The band had only been in Los Angeles for one week when all this took place.

After spending the winter in Sweden, they toured the United Kingdom in the spring of 2006. The band lived in guitarist Nicki's Volvo station wagon for a month between playing gigs around London and surrounding cities. In May, the group relocated to California. The band toured coast to coast, and in many cases were not old enough to play bars they were booked in, which had a minimum age of 21. This would sometimes leave half the band in the van outside, only to be let in to load up on stage, play, and then leave at the end of their set. One of these such tours was when Rachelle flew the band to the East Coast in the summer of 2006, where they played 1st slot in support of UK band Teenage Casket Company and The Erotics from New York. During the American East Coast tour in July 2006, the run was cut short, as Bam Margera of the show Jackass had recently signed the band to his Filthy Note Records label. Margera invited the band to his mansion to shoot a video for the song "No One's Gonna Do It for You", which Margera produced himself, and used "Don't Give a Damn" as the theme song to his upcoming MTV series Bam's Unholy Union. The band was featured in two episodes of the show.

Articles in Spin, Metal Edge, Revolver, Blender, Hustler, and other international print magazines followed. They found themselves on TV shows such as Jackass Number Two on MTV, and LA Ink, featuring good friend and fan of the band Kat Von D. The band was a guest on her TV show, and at the MusInk Festival in Southern California, where she appeared.

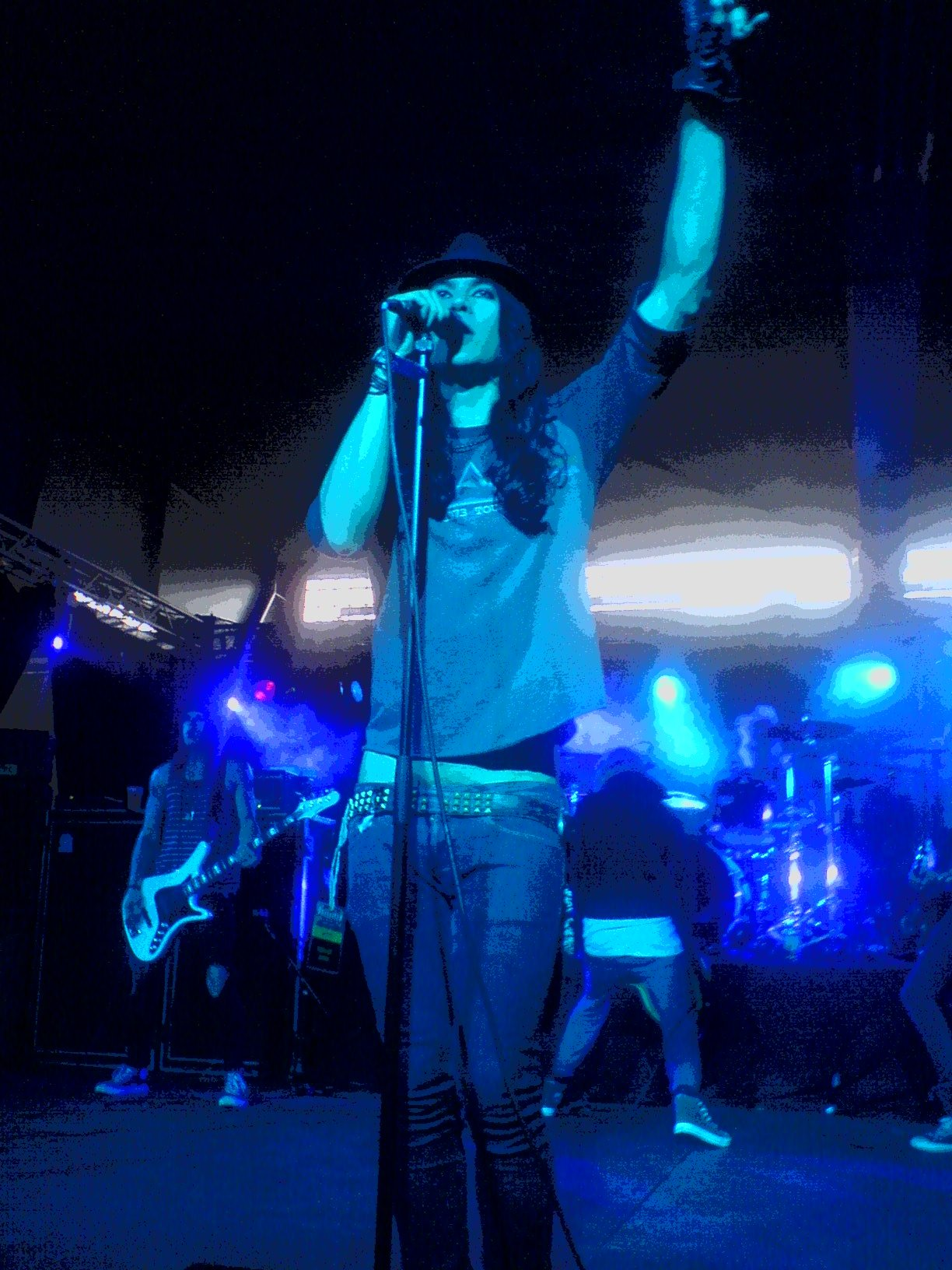
Vains of Jenna live at Hellfield Fest

Lit Up/Let Down, the band's debut full-length album, was released in stores on 24 October 2006. In early 2007, manager Rachelle called another old friend Bobby Dall of the band Poison. Rachelle had heard about the band's plan to tour in the summer with special guest Ratt. Rachelle pushed Dall to add the young band to the tour. After months of calls, the band was initially added to the side stage on several of the Live Nation produced events. As the tour grew closer, White Lion encountered some legal troubles and had to pull out. Since White Lion had to drop out, Rachelle pressured Dall to move his band onto the main stage for the Summer 2007 tour. After some time, it finally happened, and Vains of Jenna was added to the main stage for the entire North American 2007 summer tour. The band also toured the US on the Viva La Bands Tour along with Cradle of Filth, Gwar, and CKY in fall 2007. In late 2008 and early 2009, the band toured parts of Europe, including the UK, Italy, Scotland, Denmark, and Sweden. This included a spot on the Sweden Rock Festival in June 2009. Vains of Jenna then returned to the United States to record a new album. The new disc was produced by Brent Woods (Wildside). It included a cover of "Refugee" by Tom Petty, among other songs. The band released a new song, "Get It On", on iTunes in July 2009. On 15 September, Vains of Jenna released their second full-length album, The Art of Telling Lies. The band filmed a video for the first single "Get It On", and a second video with director Noah Shulman (Kings of Leon) in New York City for the following single "Mind Pollution".

In March 2010, frontman Lizzy DeVine announced he was parting ways. Less than a week after Lizzy's departure, the band hired Cast of Kings singer Jesse Forte as the new front man. In August, Vains of Jenna released an EP with a new song, "We Can Never Die", and new versions of "Everybody Loves You When You're Dead", "The Art of Telling Lies", and "Better Off Alone". In October 2010, the band returned to the US to begin the "We Can Never Die" tour and played shows in South America. In November, the band entered the studio with producer Adam Hamilton to record a "special edition" covers album for Deadline Cleopatra Records. The album, Reverse Tripped, was released on 5 April 2011. The first single/video is a cover of Cee Lo Green's "Fuck You". A radio edit is included called "Forget You". "Reverse Tripped" was followed by a 54 city North American Tour, and an equally long European tour.

On 21 January 2012, it was announced that Vains of Jenna lead singer Jesse Forte joined Lynch Mob; soon after this announcement their old lead singer returned, leaving Jesse out of Lynch Mob. Several days later, on 26 January, the following message was posted on Vains of Jenna's official Facebook & Myspace pages: "Vains Of Jenna calls it quits. After 7 years, we have amicably and mutually decided to end Vains Of Jenna. There's no drama behind the decision. We simply feel like it is time to move on in our lives and close this chapter. It has been a truly amazing journey for us over the years and we are grateful for the opportunity to do what we've done with this band. A huge thanks to everyone involved, all of our supporters, and of course all of our fans from around the world. We love you. 1,2,3,4 THE END!!! Nicki, Jacki, JP and Jesse."

== Members ==
=== Past members ===
- Jimmy Johansson / Lizzy DeVine – lead vocals, rhythm guitar (2005–2010)
- Hans Joakim Petersson / JP White – bass, background vocals (2005–2012)
- Niklas Lundahl / Nicki Kin – lead guitar, piano, background vocals (2005–2012)
- Emil Petersson / Jacki Stone – drums, percussion (2005–2012)
- Jesse Forte – lead vocals, rhythm guitar, piano, percussion (2010–2012)
- Anton Sevholt – rhythm guitar, background vocals (2009–2011)

=== Touring members ===
- Joel Eliasson – rhythm guitar (Europe/US) – 2012
- Bruce Vayn – rhythm guitar (US) – 2010

== Discography ==
=== Studio albums ===
Album	Year	Release notes
The Demos (4-song EP)	May 2005	Raw Noise Records
Lit Up/Let Down	June 2006	RLS/Raw Noise Records
The Demos (full length)	September 2006	* Re-issued – RLS/Raw Noise Records
Lit Up/Let Down	November 2006	* Re-issued – Filthy Note/Fontana/Universal
The Art of Telling Lies	September 2009	RLS/Raw Noise Records
Reverse Tripped	April 2011	Deadline Cleopatra Records

=== EPs ===
EP	Year
No One's Gonna Do It for You	2005 Raw Noise Records
Baby's Got a Secret	2005 Raw Noise Records
We Can Never Die	2010 RLS/Raw Noise Records

=== Singles ===
Year	Song	Album	Length
2006 August	"No One's Gonna Do It for You"	Lit Up/Let Down	3:12
2007 September	"Enemy in Me"	Viva la Bands, Volume 2	3:55
2009 August	"Get It On"	The Art of Telling Lies	2:56
2010 January	"Mind Pollution"	The Art of Telling Lies	3:12
2010 August	"Everybody Loves You When You're Dead-2010 Mix"	We Can Never Die	3:35
2011 March	"Fuck You" – "Forget You" (radio edit)	Reverse Tripped	3:03

=== Videos ===
Year	Song	Directed by
2006	"No One's Gonna Do It for You" (official video)	Bam Margera
2007	"Enemy in Me" (Live Footage)	Daryl Rota
2008	"Enemy in Me" (Official Video)	Sean Thomas for Cla$ick Los Angeles
2009	"Get It On" (Official Video)	R. Florio/D. Kuhlmann
2010	"Mind Pollution" (Official Video)	Noah Shulman
2010	"Everybody Loves You When You're Dead-2010 Mix" (Official Video)	Eric Sernrot & JP White.
2011	"Fuck You" – "Forget You" (radio edit) (Official Video)	Blake Bogdanovich.
