= Sound Shattering Sound =

Studio album by Gyroscope
- Released: 14 June 2004
- Recorded: 2004
- Genres: Alternative rock, post-grunge, emo
- Length: 43:20
- Label: Festival Mushroom
- Producer: Shaun O'Callaghan

Gyroscope chronology
Driving for the Storm / Doctor Doctor (2003)	Sound Shattering Sound (2004)	Are You Involved? (2005)

Singles from Sound Shattering Sound
- 1. "Safe Forever" Released: 15 March 2004; 2. "Take This for Granted" Released: June 2004; 3. "Get Down" Released: August 2004

Professional ratings
Review scores
Source	Rating
Sputnik Music	4.5/5 stars
PunkNews.org	3.5/5 stars

Sound Shattering Sound is the major label debut by Perth alternative rock band Gyroscope released on 14 June 2004 in Australia and debuted a week later on the Australian album charts in the top 40 at No 37.

== History ==
The album was produced by Shaun O'Callaghan (John Butler Trio, Eskimo Joe) who had produced the band's previous two EPs. Gyroscope vocalist and guitarist Daniel Sanders says on the Festival Mushroom Records website.

"The music that drove us the most were albums like Weezer's debut, or Foo Fighters The Colour and the Shape. They were more of an adventure rather than just being a 40-minute album. I think we got there in the end."

Five out of the album's twelve tracks were previously available either on the band's earlier EPs or singles.

== Singles ==
The first single from the album, "Safe Forever", was released on 15 March 2004, peaking in the top 100 of the ARIA Singles Chart. The song also polled at No. 97 on Triple J's Hottest 100 for 2004.

The second and third singles, "Take This for Granted" and "Get Down" both failed to chart. The music videos for both "Safe Forever" and "Take This for Granted" were directed by Matt Weston. The video for "Take This For Granted" was shot in Sydney at the now closed White Bay Power Station (the same location used in The Matrix Reloaded, Mission: Impossible III and Red Planet films).

== Track listing ==
All tracks are written by Daniel Sanders, Brad Campbell, Rob Nassif, Zoran Trivic

Sound Shattering Sound
No.	Title	Length
1.	"Confidence in Confidentiality"	3:19
2.	"Safe Forever"	3:41
3.	"Take This for Granted"	3:19
4.	"Hollow Like Cheyenne"	5:05
5.	"Doctor Doctor"	2:47
6.	"Misery"	4:11
7.	"Get Down"	2:23
8.	"Midnight Express"	4:15
9.	"Are You Getting Any Better"	3:27
10.	"My Hands Are Tied"	3:45
11.	"Driving for the Storm"	2:46
12.	"You Try Waiting This Long"	4:22
