= Smoke & Mirrors (The Petty Thefts album) =

Smoke&Mirrors

Studio album by The Petty Thefts
- Released: (Germany) 3 July 2009
- Recorded: May 2007 – June 2007 faust-Studios (Scheer, Germany)
- Genre: Indie Rock
- Length: 37:13
- Label: Klangbad/Broken Silence
- Producer: Hans Joachim Irmler

Smoke&Mirrors is the first release by German band The Petty Thefts.

== Track listing ==
All tracks are written by Frank Wegling and Andrew McGinn, except where noted.

No.	Title	Length
1.	"Caroline Blonde" (Wegling, McGinn, J. Riemann)	2:58
2.	"Kids"	2:54
3.	"Smoke&Mirrors" (Wegling, McGinn, L. Wegling)	2:56
4.	"Jiggin'"	2:39
5.	"The Legend of Piggy Bottoms"	5:04
6.	"All You've Got To Give"	3:23
7.	"Le Dancer" (Wegling, McGinn, S. Simon, J. Riemann)	3:11
8.	"Gala Ball"	2:53
9.	"Paperboy"	3:45
10.	"Pigs On Parade"	2:26
11.	"The Last Waltz"	5:07

== Personnel ==
- Victor Gerstner - violin
- Jonas Dorn - trumpet
