= Are You Involved? =

Studio album by Gyroscope
- Released: 25 September 2005
- Recorded: 2005
- Genre: Alternative rock
- Length: 41:48
- Label: Festival Mushroom Records
- Producer: Mark Trombino

Gyroscope chronology
Sound Shattering Sound (2004)	Are You Involved? (2005)	Breed Obsession (2008)

Singles from Are You Involved?
- 1. "Fast Girl/Beware Wolf" Released: 4 March 2006; 2. "Dream Vs. Scream" Released: 23 September 2006

Are You Involved? is the second major label album release by Perth alternative rock band Gyroscope. The album was released on 25 September 2005 in Australia and debuted at No. 20 on the Australian album charts. It was produced by Mark Trombino and recorded at Doug Messenger's harddrive analog and digital in North Hollywood, California.

The album was originally proposed to be recorded at Sing Sing Studios, Melbourne with Mark Hoppus (Blink 182's bass player ) producing. Hoppus however had to withdraw from the project ten days before recording commenced. The band were able to secure producer, Mark Trombino (Jimmy Eat World, Rocket from the Crypt, The Living End) at the last minute but had to shift their recording venue to Los Angeles.

At the J Award of 2005, the album was nominated for Australian Album of the Year.

At the 2006 West Australian Music Industry Awards, the album won Most Popular Album.

== Track listing ==
All tracks written by Daniel Sanders, Rob Nassif, Brad Campell & Zoran Trivic.

1. "Don't Look Now, But I Think I'm Sweating Blood" – 1:28
2. "Fast Girl" – 3:25
3. "Beware Wolf" – 3:23
4. "Mistakes & Ladders" – 3:17
5. "A Slow Dance" – 4:06
6. "Sexxxy" – 4:02
7. "Dream Vs. Scream" – 3:35
8. "Raindrops" – 5:08
9. "22 of 3" – 4:01
10. "Missed the Point" – 3:06
11. "Don't Let the Light in" – 3:52
12. "She Will Come" – 2:25
