= Australia (Gyroscope song) =

Single by Gyroscope

from the album Breed Obsession
- Released: 14 June 2008
- Recorded: 2007
- Studio: Elevator (UK)
- Genre: Acoustic; alternative rock
- Length: 3:42
- Label: Festival Mushroom
- Songwriter(s): Daniel Sanders
- Producer(s): Dave Eringa

Gyroscope singles chronology
"1981" (2008)	"Australia" (2008)	"These Days" (2008)

"Australia" is a song by Australian rock band Gyroscope, from the album Breed Obsession. It was released as the third single from their highly successful album, which peaked at number one on the Australian Albums Chart. The song was released to radio in May 2008, and was released as a CD single and digital download on 14 June 2008, along with two acoustic pieces. One of those being a live acoustic version of "Australia", the other a live acoustic cover of Chris Isaak's "Wicked Game".

== Meaning ==
The song lyrically covers a range of issues surrounding the band's home country, Australia. It notably "pays tribute to Indigenous Australians, first settlers, Diggers and recent reconciliation efforts." "Australia" is said to have risen Gyroscope's "songwriting to new heights", it's a track that confirms the Australian rock band "are equally capable of creating softer numbers as well as the harder hitting ones".

Lead vocalist and songwriter Daniel Sanders speaking about the story behind the song, said "It was essentially written about myself leaving England as a tot and coming to Australia, and then growing up here, appreciating and embracing our culture and heritage and falling in love with it all. I wanted to express it for my own sake... So I could rejoice in what I love about this country".

Access All Areas said an "intimate delivery" adds to the song's "inspiring" message, which "is set to spark feelings of national pride" amongst Australians.

== Style ==
"Australia" uses a combination of "subtle drumbeats", acoustic guitar and stringed instruments to create its sound. The use of the violin and cello are said to give the "song some extra depth". The "strong marching-band beat" of Rob Nassif's drum kit, along with the contribution of Sanders' "intimate delivery" on vocals are a main feature of the song, which is credited for its "lush melodic arrangement with perfectly placed orchestral flourishes".

== Reception ==
"Australia" was still a month from its release as a single when it received its first national coverage from Australian television and radio programs. The music video debuted on the Australian music program Rage on 23 May 2008. It also played a second time the next morning, and then again the next night, closing the show.

Upon release of Breed Obsession, "Australia" was already heralded as an "unofficial anthem" of the country. It had been earmarked by commercial stations who were "already calling it a hit". The song even took an impressive compliment from Mushroom Records chief executive officer Michael Parisi, who said "this is a new anthem. Massive, massive, massive."

Gyroscope's third single off their third – and most successful to date – album, has been compared to Australian classics as "Solid Rock" by Goanna, "Sounds of Then" by Ganggajang and the anthemic "I Am Australian" from The Seekers. This comparison was made by rock historian Glenn A. Baker, who said "these are songs that invoke in us feeling of who we are and where we are," and notably that "the Gyroscope track would have the same effect."

The song has been used for the advertisement of the final season of Australian TV show, McLeod's Daughters. It was also used as an inspiration to the Australian athletes who competed in the 2008 Beijing Olympics, with the quote "So close, but so far". This was in reference to the song's lyrics, "So close, yet we've come so far/So close, still we've got so far".

The song reached number 50 on the ARIA physical singles chart and number 52 on the Australian Singles Chart.

== Music video ==
The music video for "Australia" was released to MySpace TV and national television programs on 19 May 2008. It was filmed on 2 May 2008, in Sydney, Australia. The video was directed by Tom Sparks. It features the band walking along a beach, with cut shots of an indigenous girl, eventually the band comes to a cliff edge, where aerial shots are used to create a scenic shot of the band.

== Track listing ==
1. "Australia" – 3:49
2. "Wicked Game" (Live & Acoustic) (Chris Isaak cover) – 3:20
3. "Australia" (Live & Acoustic) – 3:29

== Personnel ==
Gyroscope
- Daniel Sanders – guitar, vocals
- Zoran Trivic – guitar, vocals
- Brad Campbell – bass, vocals
- Rob Nassif – drums
Production
- Dave Eringa – producer
