= Driving for the Storm / Doctor Doctor =

Driving for the Storm / Doctor Doctor EP

EP by Gyroscope
- Released: September 2003
- Genre: Post-grunge
- Length: 2:45
- Label: Festival/Mushroom Records
- Producer: Shaun O'Callaghan

Gyroscope chronology
Midnight Express (2003)	Driving for the Storm / Doctor Doctor EP (2003)	Sound Shattering Sound (2004)

Singles from Driving for the Storm / Doctor Doctor
- 1. "Doctor Doctor" Released: 2003

Driving for the Storm / Doctor Doctor is an EP by Australian post-grunge band Gyroscope. The EP was released in September 2003 and features the two tracks of its namesake "Driving the Storm" and "Doctor Doctor", with the later polling at No.92 in Triple J's Hottest 100 for 2003. It peaked at No. 11 on the ARIA Heatseekers Albums Chart.

== History ==
Following on from their three WAMi nominations 'Most Popular Local Original Act', 'Most Popular Local Original Indie Rock Act' and 'Most Popular Original Guitarist' (Zoran Trivic), Gyroscope released the Driving for the Storm / Doctor Doctor EP.

Recorded at Studio Couch in Fremantle by Shaun O'Callaghan, it was released in September 2003 as a double A-side single/EP. In addition to "Driving for the Storm" and "Doctor/Doctor" are two tracks that are fan favourites, recorded live at the Amplifier Bar in Perth, "Fire Away" and "I've Been Struck By Lightning Once... So What's The Chance Of It Happening Again?". The later was based on the fact that, Daniel Sanders was struck by lightning, whilst he was out fishing with the band's manager of all places.

In an interview vocalist/guitarist Daniel Sanders described the genesis of "Driving for the Storm" as being "Always hated being frustrated. I mean like when a mosquito-is-buzzing-around-your-head-at-night irritating kind of frustrated…but on a bigger scale. Just when those little things in life get too much for you or push you over the edge. Best thing to do is go for a long drive, put on your absolute favourite album, turn it up, and sing to it as loud as you can." He also stated in regard to "Doctor Doctor" that "I had a fat riff, Zok [Zoran Trivic] had a killer lead, Rob [Rob Nassif] had a huge beat...and Brad [Brad Campbell] started singing...Doctor doctor help me? What's up with that! Seriously though, it just sounded mint so we wrote the rest pretty easily - another one of those 'clicker' songs. Every six months or so I write a song dedicated to an ex-girlfriend who I dislike…very much."

Drummer Rob Nassif in a subsequent interview states that "Driving for the Storm" as "still one of our favourites to play live. This is my one and only contribution to lyrics and a vocal melody in any Gyro song. We had written the tune and Dan [Daniel Sanders] had come up with some great verse parts but was stuck on the chorus... We all went away and had a crack at a chorus. My idea was simply to mimic the bass line that Brad was playing. The lyrics were one of the first things that came to mind and boom, the song was finally finished." In respect to "Doctor Doctor" Nassif recalls "I still remember the day we wrote this song. Brad Campbell waltzes in to rehearsals singing a zesty little melody... "Doctor, doctor help meeee" . We all joined in and started jamming along. Twenty-five minutes later, we all walk out of the jam room laughing and high-fiving about how much we love the tune and how quick we wrote it. To this day, still the quickest song we have ever written." "This song really signifies a big moment in the world of Gyroscope. It was the first song we ever wrote that got a really big reaction from the crowd even before it was released."

== Track listing ==
All tracks are written by Daniel Sanders, Brad Campbell, Rob Nassif, Zoran Trivic

No.	Title	Length
1.	"Driving the Storm"	2:45
2.	"Doctor Doctor"	2:47
3.	"Fire Away" (Live)	3:02
4.	"I've Been Struck By Lightning Once... So What's The Chance Of It Happening Again?"	3:42

== Personnel ==
Gyroscope

- Daniel Sanders – guitar, vocals
- Zoran Trivic – guitar, vocals
- Brad Campbell – bass, vocals
- Rob Nassif – drums
