= Some of the Places I Know =

Single by Gyroscope

from the album Cohesion
- A-side: "Some of the Places I Know"
- B-side: "Spanish Flies"
- Released: 19 March 2010
- Genre: Alternative rock
- Length: 3:50
- Label: Island/Universal Music
- Songwriters: Daniel Sanders, Rob Nassif, Brad Campbell, Zoran Trivic
- Producer: Gil Norton

Gyroscope singles chronology
"These Days" (2008)	"Some of the Places I Know" (2010)	"Baby I'm Getting Better" (2010)

"Some of the Places I Know" is the first single from Gyroscope's album, Cohesion. It was released to radio on 1 February 2010 and made available digitally on 19 March 2010. The single debuted at No. 32 on the ARIA Singles Chart, making it the second highest-charting single by the band. "Some of the Places I Know" peaked at No. 3 on the ARIA Top 20 Australian Singles Charts.

"Some of the Places I Know" has been selected by the AFL side, West Coast Eagles, as part of its 2010 brand campaign. The band members are all self-confessed fans of the Eagles football team.

The video was filmed in the rugged terrain of rural Western Australia. During an interview on the children's program "Studio 3" (on ABC3), the band members told the hosts it was inspired by Western Australia. Amberly Lobo, one of the hosts of Studio 3, is also from W.A.

== Track listing ==
All songs were written by Daniel Sanders, Rob Nassif, Brad Campbell, Zoran Trivic.

1. "Some of the Places I Know" - 3:50
2. "Spanish Flies" - 3:23
