= 1981 (song) =

Single by Gyroscope

from the album Breed Obsession
- B-side: "We Will Kill You"
- Released: 18 February 2008
- Genre: Alternative rock
- Length: 3:39
- Label: Festival Mushroom
- Songwriters: Daniel Sanders, Rob Nassif, Brad Campbell, Zoran Trivic
- Producer: Dave Eringa

Gyroscope singles chronology
"Snakeskin" (2007)	"1981" (2008)	"Australia" (2008)

"1981" is the second single from Australian alternative rock band, Gyroscope's third album, Breed Obsession. It was released on 18 February 2008, as a CD and digital download and as a limited number 7" vinyl copies (500 units), available exclusively from JB Hi-Fi. It peaked at No. 67 on the ARIA Singles Chart.

Despite not charting in the top 50, the track received "high rotation" on Australian youth radio network, Triple J. Access All Areas' website's writer noted that "1981" shows the "more "melodic" side of Gyroscope".

== Track listing ==
All songs were written by Daniel Sanders, Rob Nassif, Brad Campbell, Zoran Trivic.

1. "1981" - 3:39
2. "We Will Kill You" - 4:02
3. "Beneath all the Pain are Lies" - 3:26
4. "When it Rains it Pours" (iTunes bonus track)
