= These Days (Gyroscope song) =

Single by Gyroscope

from the album Breed Obsession
- A-side: "These Days"
- B-side: Forever Old; Strummer
- Released: 1 November 2008
- Recorded: 2007; Elevator Studios (Liverpool)
- Genre: Alternative rock
- Length: 4:02
- Label: Warner
- Songwriter(s): Daniel Sanders, Rob Nassif, Brad Campbell, Zoran Trivic
- Producer(s): Dave Eringa

Gyroscope singles chronology
| "Australia" (2008) | "These Days" (2008) | "Some of the Places I Know" (2010) |

"These Days" is the fourth single from Australian alternative rockers, Gyroscope's third studio album, Breed Obsession. It was released as a digital download by Warner Music on iTunes on 1 November 2008, containing two previously unreleased B-sides. The song, together with the rest of the album was recorded at Elevator Studios in Liverpool with Dave Eringa (Idlewild, Manic Street Preachers). The song has been a part of the band's live show since the album's release. In October 2008, Gyroscope posted a live video of the song on their Myspace profile, which Daniel Sanders, their lead singer described "We took a lot of time and care recording this one, as we wanted to make sure it was stamped with that proper English guitar tone."

A review on Australian music website, Faster Louder, regarding the song, states "A simply classic guitar riff from Zoran [Trivic] starts things off while a ticking drumbeat supplements Daniel’s "un, deux, trois" count in. Memorable guitar chords and tight drumming perfectly complement what will surely become another Gyroscope classic." TheDwarf website reviewer, Rebelution, described their live performance in May 2012 "[they] launched straight into 'These Days' and 'Confidence in Confidentiality' with an energy and enthusiasm that was maintained throughout the night. Even their more mellow songs, like 'These Days', were given an intense and vibrant edge."

== Track listing ==
All tracks are written by Daniel Sanders, Brad Campbell, Rob Nassif, Zoran Trivic

These Days
| No. | Title | Length |
|---|---|---|
| 1. | "These Days" | 4:02 |
| 2. | "Forever Old" | 3:42 |
| 3. | "Strummer" | 4:09 |

== Personnel ==
Gyroscope
- Daniel Sanders – guitar, vocals
- Zoran Trivic – guitar, vocals
- Brad Campbell – bass, vocals
- Rob Nassif – drums
Production
- Dave Eringa – producer, mixing, sound engineer
- Howie Weinberg - mastering
- Sean Genockey - mixing
- Sean Sinnott - sound engineer
