= Take Time (Gyroscope EP) =

EP by Gyroscope
- Released: 19 May 2002; 22 years ago
- Recorded: Early 2002 Studio Couch, Perth, Western Australia
- Genre: Post-grunge
- Length: 15:57
- Label: Redline
- Producer: Shaun O'Callaghan

Gyroscope chronology
Injuring Yourself Whilst Making Music (2001)	Take Time (2002)	Midnight Express (2000)

Take Time is the third extended play by Gyroscope and was released in May 2002. The five-track EP was recorded at Studio Couch in Perth, Western Australia earlier that year and was produced and engineered by Shaun O'Callaghan.

== History ==
Take Time was recorded by Gyroscope at Studio Couch in Perth, Western Australia early in 2002 and was produced and engineered by Shaun O'Callaghan. It was issued on 19 May 2002.

Following the release of their compilation album, Injuring Yourself Whilst Making Music, in 2001 the group went on hiatus, while their drummer, Rob Nassif, went to Canada to study for six months. Upon his return, they signed a deal with Fremantle-based independent record label, Redline Records (owned by local band, Jebediah). The first track written upon their resumption was "I've Been Struck by Lightning Once... So What's the Chance of It Happening Again?" – Daniel Sanders, their lead singer, had literally been struck by lightning whilst he was out fishing with the band's manager.

In support of the appearance of Take Time they undertook a national tour backing Jebediah throughout July and August. In October 2002 Juice Magazine listed Gyroscope as one of the next big things along with The Vines, Jet and the Datsuns. At the end of that year Gyroscope won a WAMi Award for 'Most Popular Local Original Punk Act'.

The success of Take Time led to a deal with Festival/Mushroom, which signed the band in 2003.

The band's debut music video was for "Save the Last Match" and was produced by Andrew Miller.

== Track listing ==
All tracks are written by D. Sanders, Z. Trivic, R. Nassif, B. Campbell

CD single
No.	Title	Length
1.	"Save the Last Match"	3:03
2.	"Only November"	3:36
3.	"I've Been Struck by Lightning Once... So What's the Chance of It Happening Again?"	3:32
4.	"Not Dead Nor Dying"	2:43
5.	"Distance with You"	3:03
