= Breed Obsession =

Studio album by Gyroscope
- Released: 8 March 2008
- Recorded: 2007
- Studio: Elevator, Liverpool
- Genre: Alternative rock
- Length: 42:59
- Label: Warner Music Australia
- Producer: Dave Eringa

Gyroscope chronology
Are You Involved? (2005)	Breed Obsession (2008)	Cohesion (2010)

Singles from Breed Obsession
- 1. "Snakeskin" Released: 27 October 2007; 2. "1981" Released: 12 February 2008; 3. "Australia" Released: 12 July 2008; 4. "These Days" Released: 1 November 2008

Professional ratings
Review scores
Source	Rating
Access All Areas	(favourable)
AllMusic	2.5/5 stars
Faster Louder.com	(favourable)
Kill Your Stereo	75/100

Breed Obsession is the third studio album by Australian rock band Gyroscope, produced by Dave Eringa and released through Warner Music on 8 March 2008.

The album was recorded, mixed and produced in the United Kingdom. It was the second time Gyroscope had headed overseas to record, after working in Los Angeles on their previous album Are You Involved?, in 2005.

Breed Obsession debuted at number one on the Australian ARIA Albums Chart, making it the band's most commercially successful album. The album received further accolades when it was certified gold by ARIA in August 2008.

== Recording ==
The album was recorded at Elevator Studios in Liverpool with Dave Eringa (Idlewild, Manic Street Preachers), and mixed at Livingstone in London, United Kingdom. Zoran Trivic in an interview explaining why they recorded so far away from the home town of Perth:

"We didn't really decide to travel afar purposely. We loved Dave Eringa's work [producer on Breed Obsession] for his previous records with Idlewild. His sounds are broad and varied and raw but still precise. He lives in London so we had to travel to work with him. And he was a godsend to tell you the truth. A great experience."

== Singles ==
The first single from the album, "Snakeskin", was released on 27 October 2007, debuting at No. 30 on the ARIA singles chart, was number-one most voted on JTV, number-one most requested song on Triple J's Super Request and was ranked No. 16 on Triple J's Hottest 100 for 2007. The "Snakeskin" video was shot in Wiltshire, near Stonehenge, south of London. The video sees the band playing in the middle of a 200-metre crop circle that was made specifically for the video, in the same farm where the Led Zeppelin crop circle was made that featured on the cover of the Remasters compilation album. "Snakeskin" was featured in all Network 10 promotions for the 2008 AFL season. The song also won two WAMi Awards for 'Best Single' and 'Best Video'.

On 12 February 2008 the band released the second single from the album, "1981", which peaked at No. 67 on the ARIA singles chart.

The song "Australia" was released as the third single in July 2008. It reached No. 50 on the physical singles chart and No. 99 on the ARIA singles chart. The song was heralded as a potential hit and unofficial anthem, with Mushroom Records chief Michael Parisi saying "This is a new anthem. Massive, massive, massive." The song pays tribute to indigenous people, first settlers, Diggers and recent reconciliation efforts. Songwriter Daniel Sanders stating:

"I wanted to express it for my own sake. So I could rejoice in what I love about this country. Each to their own, but this is simply one Australian talking to another about how blessed we are. It's not patriotic or waving flags. It's a song to be enjoyed with a beer. Cheers, Australia. Tip of the cap."

== Track listing ==
All songs written by Daniel Sanders, Rob Nassif, Brad Campbell, Zoran Trivic.

Breed Obsession track listing
No.	Title	Length
1.	"Snakeskin"	4:10
2.	"All in on One"	3:25
3.	"These Days"	4:02
4.	"Australia"	3:49
5.	"O.K."	3:54
6.	"Weapon. Enemy. Friend."	3:36
7.	"Polyphons and Multidors"	2:44
8.	"The River Between"	3:32
9.	"Her Design"	3:26
10.	"1981"	3:38
11.	"Silver Heart"	3:00
12.	"Time"	3:50

iTunes bonus tracks
No.	Title	Length
13.	"5am" (demo)	4:20
14.	"Body Aches" (demo)	2:37

Warner Music website bonus track
No.	Title	Length
13.	"Left Field"	3:05

JB Hi-Fi DVD exclusive
No.	Title	Length
1.	"Making of the album"
2.	"Making of "Snakeskin" & "1981" videos"
3.	"7 mini documentaries of the band in the lead up to recording the album"
4.	"Snakeskin" (music video)	4:18
5.	"1981" (music video)	3:38

== Personnel ==
Gyroscope

- Daniel Sanders – vocals, guitar
- Zoran Trivic – guitar, Sequencer, piano sample on "Snakeskin"
- Brad Campbell – bass guitar
- Rob Nassif – drums, electronic drums on "1981"

Recording details

- Dave Eringa – producer

== Chart performance ==
=== Weekly charts ===
Weekly chart performance for Breed Obsession
Chart (2008)	Peak position
Australian Albums (ARIA)	1

=== Year-end charts ===
Year-end chart performance for Breed Obsession
Chart (2008)	Position
Australian Albums (ARIA)	90

== Release history ==
Release history and formats for Breed Obsession
Country	Date	Label	Format	Catalogue #
Australia	8 March 2008	Warner	CD, MP3, DVD	#5144248852
