= The Datsuns (album) =

Studio album by The Datsuns
- Released: 7 October 2002
- Recorded: Toe Rag Studios
- Genre: Hard rock, garage rock revival
- Length: 39:09
- Label: V2 Records; Hellsquad Records
- Producer: Liam Watson; Nick Abbot; Sonic Newth; The Datsuns

The Datsuns chronology
The Datsuns (2002)	Outta Sight/Outta Mind (2004)

Professional ratings
Aggregate scores
Source	Rating
Metacritic	67/100
Review scores
Source	Rating
The Age	3/5 stars
AllMusic	3/5 stars
Daily Breeze	2/4 stars
The Guardian	3/5 stars
London Free Press	(favourable)
Pitchfork Media	2.8/10
The Press	4/5 stars
The Scotsman	(favourable)
The Times	3/5 stars
Tucson Citizen	(favourable)
Waikato Times	5/5 stars

The Datsuns is the debut album of the New Zealand hard rock band The Datsuns. It was released in 2002 and had three songs which had previously appeared on 7" singles: "Sittin' Pretty", "Fink For The Man" and "Lady".

A music video was produced for "In Love", which consists of a black and white concert footage of the song's performance. On the 2003 revival of Headbangers Ball, hosted by Metallica, drummer Lars Ulrich praised The Datsuns before playing "In Love".

== Track listing ==
1. "Sittin' Pretty" 3:02
2. "MF From Hell" 3:34
3. "Lady" 2:56
4. "Harmonic Generator" 3:04
5. "What Would I Know" 5:35
6. "At Your Touch" 3:30
7. "Fink For The Man" 4:34
8. "In Love" 2:55
9. "You Build Me Up (To Bring Me Down)" 3:58
10. "Freeze Sucker" 6:01

== Charts ==
Chart (2002–2004)	Peak position
Australian Albums (ARIA Charts)	73
New Zealand Albums (RMNZ)	1
Scottish Albums (OCC)	13
UK Albums (OCC)	17
UK Independent Albums (OCC)	1

== Certifications ==
Region	Certification	Certified units/sales
New Zealand (RMNZ)	Gold	7,500^{^}
United Kingdom (BPI)	Silver	60,000^{^}
^{^} Shipments figures based on certification alone.
