= Cohesion (album) =

Studio album by Gyroscope
- Released: 9 April 2010
- Recorded: 2009–2010, Rockfield Studios, Wales
- Genre: Alternative rock
- Length: 42:44
- Label: Island
- Producer: Gil Norton

Gyroscope chronology
Breed Obsession (2008)	Cohesion (2010)

Singles from Cohesion
- 1. "Some of the Places I Know" Released: 1 February 2010; 2. "Baby, I'm Gettin' Better" Released: 17 May 2010; 3. "What Do I Know About Pain?" Released: 1 October 2010; 4. "Fifty500" Released: 1 April 2011

Cohesion is the fourth studio album by Australian rock band Gyroscope, released through Island Records on 9 April 2010. It peaked at No. 3 on the ARIA Albums Chart.

The album's first single "Some of the Places I Know" was released on 1 February 2010, and the second single "Baby, I'm Gettin' Better" was released on 17 May. The third single, What Do I Know About Pain? was released on 1 October 2010. All three songs have had music videos provided for them. The first two singles have peaked within the top 40 of the ARIA Singles Charts.

== Album history ==
The production of the album was first revealed towards the end of September 2009, when the band announced on their MySpace that they had "packed up their gear and headed to the rolling green hills of Monmouth, Wales to record album #4." They also announced that Gil Norton (Foo Fighters, Pixies) would be producing the album.

Gyroscope uploaded "Live Without You" to their MySpace in January 2010, the first song released from the album. It was later put up as a free download for fans.

On 28 January 2010, the band revealed that the first single, "Some of the Places I Know", would be released on 1 February 2010 to radio, with a music video. They also announced the release date of the album to be 9 April 2010, and the album title, Cohesion.

On 3 March, Gyroscope announced they would be releasing three "Cohesion" preview videos on YouTube, two of which have been released. Part 1 was released on 10 March, featuring previews of the song "What Do I Know About Pain?" from the album, as well as the members of Gyroscope talking about the album. Part 2 came out on 19 March, featuring more footage of the personnel working on the album, as well as the band recording the song "I Still Taste Blood". Part 3 came out on 28 March, featuring snippets of the songs "Fifty 500" and "Don't Forget Me When I Die". The intro to "Baby, I'm Gettin' Better" was used as the starter to all three videos, and the outro to "White Dove/Black Crow" was at the end of all three videos.

The single, "Some of the Places I Know", was made available as a digital download on 19 April 2010. It came with a bonus track, named "Spanish Flies". The single debuted at No. 32 on the ARIA Charts, making it their second highest charting single and their fifth charting single.

Since 1 April, the entire album has been available for listening on the band's MySpace.

"Some of the Places I Know" has been selected by the AFL side, West Coast Eagles, as part of its 2010 brand campaign. The band members are all self-confessed fans of the Eagles football team.

"What Do I Know About Pain?", the third release from the album "Cohesion", was released to Australian radio in late-August 2010.

The fourth single from the album was, "Fifty500", which was released as a digital download on 1 April 2011.

== Reception ==
Professional ratings
Review scores
Source	Rating
Triple J	(positive)
Sputnikmusic	3.5/5 stars
Rave Magazine	4/5 stars

== Track listing ==
1. "Live Without You" – 2:59
2. "I Still Taste Blood" – 3:57
3. "Baby, I'm Gettin' Better" – 3:18
4. "Some of the Places I Know" – 3:51
5. "Tunnel Vision" – 3:15
6. "Working with Wood" – 3:08
7. "Fifty500" – 3:33
8. "What Do I Know About Pain?" – 3:30
9. "Don't Forget Me When I Die" – 2:51
10. "Run" – 4:16
11. "White Dove / Black Crow" – 3:31
12. "Spider" – 4:14

=== Bonus tracks ===
1. "They Look Like Clouds" (iTunes bonus track) - 3:11
2. "Light It on Fire" (iTunes pre-order bonus track)

== Personnel ==
Gyroscope

- Daniel Sanders – vocals, guitar
- Zoran Trivic – guitar
- Brad Campbell – bass guitar
- Rob Nassif – drums

Recording details

- Gil Norton
