= Smoke & Mirrors (The Datsuns album) =

Studio album by The Datsuns
- Released: 2 October 2006
- Genre: Hard rock, garage rock revival
- Label: V2 Records
- Producer: The Datsuns

The Datsuns chronology
| Stuck Here for Days (2006) | Smoke & Mirrors (2006) | Head Stunts (2008) |

Professional ratings
Aggregate scores
| Source | Rating |
|---|---|
| Metacritic | 62/100 |
Review scores
| Source | Rating |
| Allmusic | 2.5/5 stars |
| The Guardian | 3/5 stars |

Smoke & Mirrors is The Datsuns' third studio album, released on 9 October 2006.

== Track listing ==
1. "Who Are You Stamping Your Foot For?"
2. "System Overload"
3. "Waiting for Your Time to Come"
4. "Stuck Here For Days"
5. "Maximum Heartbreak"
6. "All Aboard"
7. "Such A Pretty Curse"
8. "Blood Red"
9. "Emperor's New Clothes"
10. "Too Little Fire"

== Charts ==
| Chart (2006) | Peak position |
|---|---|
| Australian Albums (ARIA Charts) | 92 |
| New Zealand Albums (RMNZ) | 16 |
