= Fast Girl / Beware Wolf =

2006 single by Gyroscope

"Fast Girl" / "Beware Wolf"

Single by Gyroscope

from the album Are You Involved?
- B-side: "T.I.A"
- Released: 6 March 2006
- Length: 3:20
- Label: Warner
- Songwriters: Daniel Sanders, Rob Nassif, Brad Campbell, Zoran Trivic
- Producer: Mark Trombino

Gyroscope singles chronology
"Get Down" (2004)	"Fast Girl" / "Beware Wolf" (2006)	"Dream vs Scream" (2006)

"Fast Girl" / "Beware Wolf" is a double A-sided single by Australian alternative rock band Gyroscope from their 2005 album, Are You Involved?. It was released as the first single from the album on 6 March 2006 and peaked at No. 43 on the Australian Singles Charts. Both "Fast Girl" and "Beware Wolf" appeared on national radio Triple J's Hottest 100 for 2005, where they were listed at No. 29 and No. 62, respectively. The CD version contained a previously unreleased B-Side, which is a live recording of the Jebediah track, "Monument"; as well as an acoustic version of their own track, "Sexxy".

The Limited Edition Maxi-Single included music videos for "Fast Girl" and "Beware Wolf" as well as a "making of" video on the respective music videos and a Screensaver. "Monument" was recorded by Triple J as part of their "Like a Version" segment and also appears on Like a Version Vol. 2. The music video for "Fast Girl" was filmed in Death Valley, Southern California.

Gyroscope were nominated for 'Best Breakthrough Artist' for "Fast Girl" at the ARIA Music Awards of 2006.

== Track listing ==
All songs were written by Daniel Sanders, Rob Nassif, Brad Campbell, Zoran Trivic, except "Monument", written by Jebediah.

1. "Fast Girl" – 3:20
2. "Beware Wolf" – 3:25
3. "T.I.A" – 4:07
4. "Monument" (live) – 4:04
5. "Sexxy" (acoustic) – 3:46
