= Scalectrix =

Scalectrix EP

EP by Gyroscope
- Released: April 2000
- Recorded: December 1999
- Studio: Revolver Studios (Perth)
- Genre: Post-grunge
- Length: 16:17
- Label: Independent

Gyroscope chronology
Gyroscope (1998)	Scalectrix EP (2000)	Means to an End (2000)

Scalectrix is the debut EP by Australian post-grunge band, Gyroscope, and was released in April 2000. The five-track EP was recorded at Revolver Studios in Perth and engineered by Laurie Sinagra and Gav Tempany. This release helped the band secure support spots with national and international touring acts, including Millencolin, Bodyjar, 28 Days, Unwritten Law and Toe To Toe.

== Track listing ==
All tracks are written by Daniel Sanders, Brad Campbell, Rob Nassif, Zoran Trivic

Scalectrix
No.	Title	Length
1.	"Insanity"	3:06
2.	"Skill Degree"	2:47
3.	"Scalectrix"	3:45
4.	"S4"	3:20
5.	"Half Your Problem"	3:19
