= Midnight Express (EP) =

Midnight Express EP

EP by Gyroscope
- Released: 2 May 2003
- Genre: Post-grunge
- Length: 18:36
- Label: Festival/Mushroom

Gyroscope chronology
Take Time (2002)	Midnight Express EP (2003)	Driving for the Storm / Doctor Doctor (2003)

Midnight Express is the fifth release by Gyroscope and was released 2 May 2003. It is their first release on the Festival/Mushroom label. The EP was recorded at Perth, Western Australia's Studio Couch with producer Shaun O'Callaghan (Eskimo Joe, John Butler Trio) at the helm. Many fans of the older style sound that Gyroscope had back then refer to this EP and the following double a-side single "Driving for the Storm / Doctor Doctor" as being the pinnacle / high point of their career so far. In 2003 Bombshellzine.com’s readers voted Gyroscope as 'Best Australian Live Band', ‘Best Australian Breakthrough Act’ and Midnight Express as 'Most Popular EP'. Following the release of Midnight Express the band undertook a national tour in support of 28 Days.

Midnight Express peaked at No. 179 on the ARIA Singles Chart and No. 27 on the Western Australian Singles Charts.

"Midnight Express" was featured on the 2003 WAMi compilation CD, Kiss My WAMi 2003. Later that year the band received three WAMi nominations for 'Most Popular Local Original Act', 'Most Popular Local Original Indie Rock Act' and 'Most Popular Original Guitarist' (Zoran Trivic).

The music video for "Fire Away" and "Midnight Express" were produced by Matt Weston (The Nation Blue), with the video for "Fire Away" filmed at Melbourne's Spencer Street railway station.

== Track listing ==
No.	Title	Writer(s)	Length
1.	"The Lesser Me"	D. Sanders, Z. Trivic, R. Nassif, B. Campbell	1:50
2.	"Fire Away"	D. Sanders, Z. Trivic, R. Nassif, B. Campbell	3:04
3.	"Midnight Express"	D. Sanders, Z. Trivic, R. Nassif, B. Campbell	3:30
4.	"Sharp Words"	D. Sanders, Z. Trivic, R. Nassif, B. Campbell	4:03
5.	"I Wish I Did When I Didn't"	D. Sanders, Z. Trivic, R. Nassif, B. Campbell	3:28
6.	"Chapter 13"	D. Sanders, Z. Trivic, R. Nassif, B. Campbell	2:41
