= Snakeskin (song) =

Single by Gyroscope

from the album Breed Obsession
- A-side: "Snakeskin"
- B-side: "Going up in Smoke"
- Released: 27 October 2007
- Genre: Alternative rock
- Length: 4:13
- Label: Festival Mushroom Records
- Songwriter(s): Daniel Sanders, Rob Nassif, Brad Campbell, Zoran Trivic
- Producer(s): Dave Eringa

Gyroscope singles chronology
"Dream vs Scream" (2006)	"Snakeskin" (2007)	"1981" (2008)

"Snakeskin" is a song by Australian alternative rock band Gyroscope, from the album Breed Obsession. It was released as the first single from the album on 27 October 2007, which peaked at No. 30 on the ARIA Singles Chart. "Snakeskin" was listed at No. 16 in national radio Triple J's Hottest 100 for 2007. The CD version of the EP contained two previously unreleased B-sides while the digital release from iTunes included a third unreleased B-side.

"Spending some time in hibernation whilst writing this album has made for some great progressions… 'Snakeskin' is a great representation of our head space and expresses a lot of the emotions and directions we have taken in the creation of our 3rd record. Like a snake shedding its well worn skin, these are the days of our lives." Daniel Sanders

The "Snakeskin" video was shot in Wiltshire, near Stonehenge, south of London. The video has the band playing in the middle of a 200-metre crop circle that was made specifically for the shoot. It is the same farm where the Led Zeppelin crop circle was made that features on the cover of the group's Remasters compilation album.

"Snakeskin" was featured in all Network 10 promotions for the 2008 Australian Football League season. The song also won two WAMi Awards for 'Best Single' and 'Best Video'.

== Track listing ==
All songs were written by Daniel Sanders, Rob Nassif, Brad Campbell, Zoran Trivic.

1. "Snakeskin" – 4:13
2. "Going up in Smoke" – 4:18
3. "The Last Song" – 3:34
4. "My Story" (iTunes bonus track)
