= System Overload (song) =

Single by The Datsuns

from the album Smoke & Mirrors
- Released: 2006
- Genre: Rock and roll
- Length: 2:31
- Label: Hellsquad
- Songwriters: Dolf de Borst, Christian Livingstone, Matt Osment, Phil Somervell

The Datsuns singles chronology
"Stuck Here for Days" (2006)	"System Overload" (2006)

"System Overload" is a garage rock song by New Zealand rock and roll band The Datsuns. It is the second single released from the album Smoke & Mirrors. It was released on both vinyl and compact disc in 2006.

The song is typical of the Datsuns style with loud guitar, a lead break and dominant vocals.

In 2013, the song was used in the video game Saints Row IV in the fictional in-game radio station Generation X.

== Track listing ==
1. "System Overload"
2. "Don't shine your light on me"
3. "Killer Bees"
