= Blacken My Thumb =

Single by The Datsuns
- Released: August 2, 2004
- Recorded: November 2003
- Studio: Jacobs Studio
- Label: Hellsquad Records
- Songwriters: Dolf de Borst, Christian Livingstone, Matt Osment, Phil Somervell

The Datsuns singles chronology
"Mother Fucker from Hell" (2003)	"Blacken My Thumb" (2004)	"Girl's Best Friend" (2004)

"Blacken My Thumb" is a single by New Zealand rock band The Datsuns in 2004. It charted in the UK for two weeks, peaking at 48.

== Track listing ==
CD

1. "Blacken My Thumb"
2. "Good Luck ... You're Gonna Need It"
3. "Burst Your Bubble"

Vinyl

1. "Blacken My Thumb"
2. "Not Coming Back"
