= The Datsuns =

Hard rock band from Cambridge, New Zealand

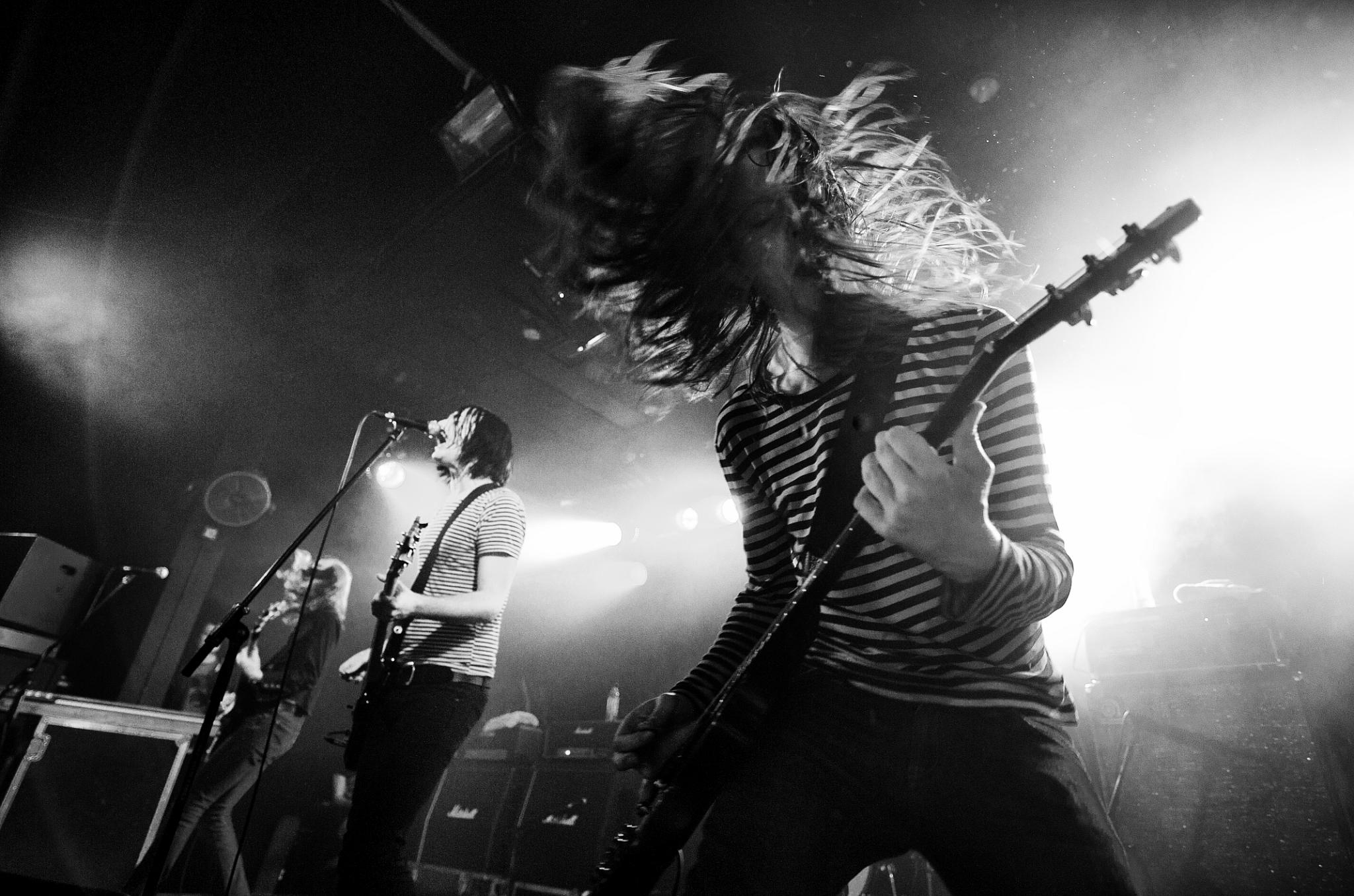
- The Datsuns performing in 2008

Background information
- Origin: Cambridge, New Zealand
- Genres: Hard rock; garage rock
- Years active: 1998–2016, 2018, 2021–present
- Labels: Hell Squad; In-Fidelity; V2; Cooking Vinyl
- Spinoffs: Cold Ethyl
- Members: Dolf de Borst; Christian Livingstone; Phil Somervell; Adam Lindmark
- Past members: Matt Osment; Ben Cole

The Datsuns are a hard rock band from Cambridge, New Zealand, formed in 1998. Founding mainstays are Rudolf "Dolf" de Borst on vocals and bass guitar, and Christian Livingstone and Phil Somervell, both on guitar. They have released seven albums, with their debut self-titled album from October 2002 peaking at no. 1 in New Zealand and reaching the top 20 on the United Kingdom's Official Charts. They had relocated to London in 2002. Their second album, Outta Sight/Outta Mind (May 2004), appeared at no. 7 in New Zealand and top 60 in the UK. Smoke & Mirrors (2006) peaked in the top 20 in New Zealand. Early drummer Matt Osment was replaced by Ben Cole after that album. Their top 40 singles in the UK are "In Love" and "Harmonic Generator" (both in 2002). In New Zealand, their highest-charting single, "Stuck Here for Days" (2006), reached the top 30.

== History ==
In 1995, while still at secondary school in Cambridge, New Zealand, Rudolf "Dolf" de Borst on vocals and bass guitar, Matt Osment on drums, and Phil Somervell on guitar formed a hard rock band, Trinket. Christian Livingstone joined in 1997 as their second guitarist and they entered a Battle of the Bands competition.

In 1998, they changed their name to the Datsuns, and initially each member used the band's name as their last name; de Borst performed as Dolf D. Datsun. As the Datsuns they won a Battle of the Bands. They supported Swedish band the Hellacopters at a concert in Hamilton in October 1998. The group secured another support slot in May 2000, behind Canadian visitors the Smugglers. In August of that year, the Datsuns released their first single, "Super Gyration", on 7-inch vinyl only. They supported the White Stripes in November that year. Their early material was issued on their own label, Hellsquad Records. They toured Australia in March 2001 and then relocated to London to try the United Kingdom market.

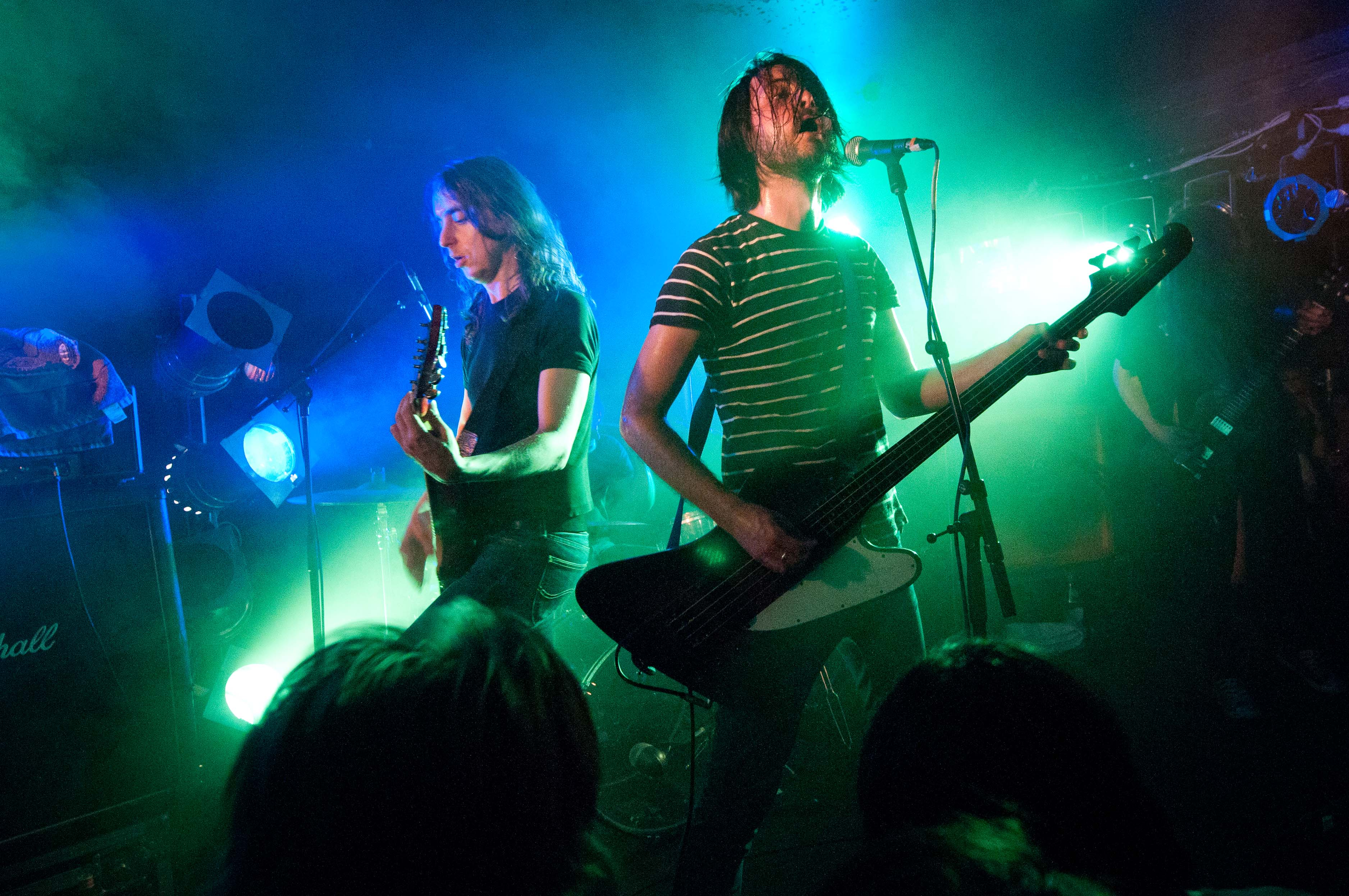
The Datsuns in concert, Auckland, January 2012

In 2002 after appearing on John Peel's programme on the BBC Radio 1, the Datsuns were lauded by the UK music press, including in a front cover article in NME. The band signed with V2 Records in July of that year. Their self-titled debut album appeared in October, which reached no. 17 in the UK and number-one in New Zealand. Its third single, "In Love" (2002), peaked in the top 30 in the UK. The band toured Australia in 2002 with Melbourne bands the Specimens and the Casanovas, as well as playing a live to air on PBS radio. The group won numerous awards including NME's 'Best Live Band' and New Zealand Music Awards for 'Best Album', 'Best Group' and 'Breakthrough Artist'.

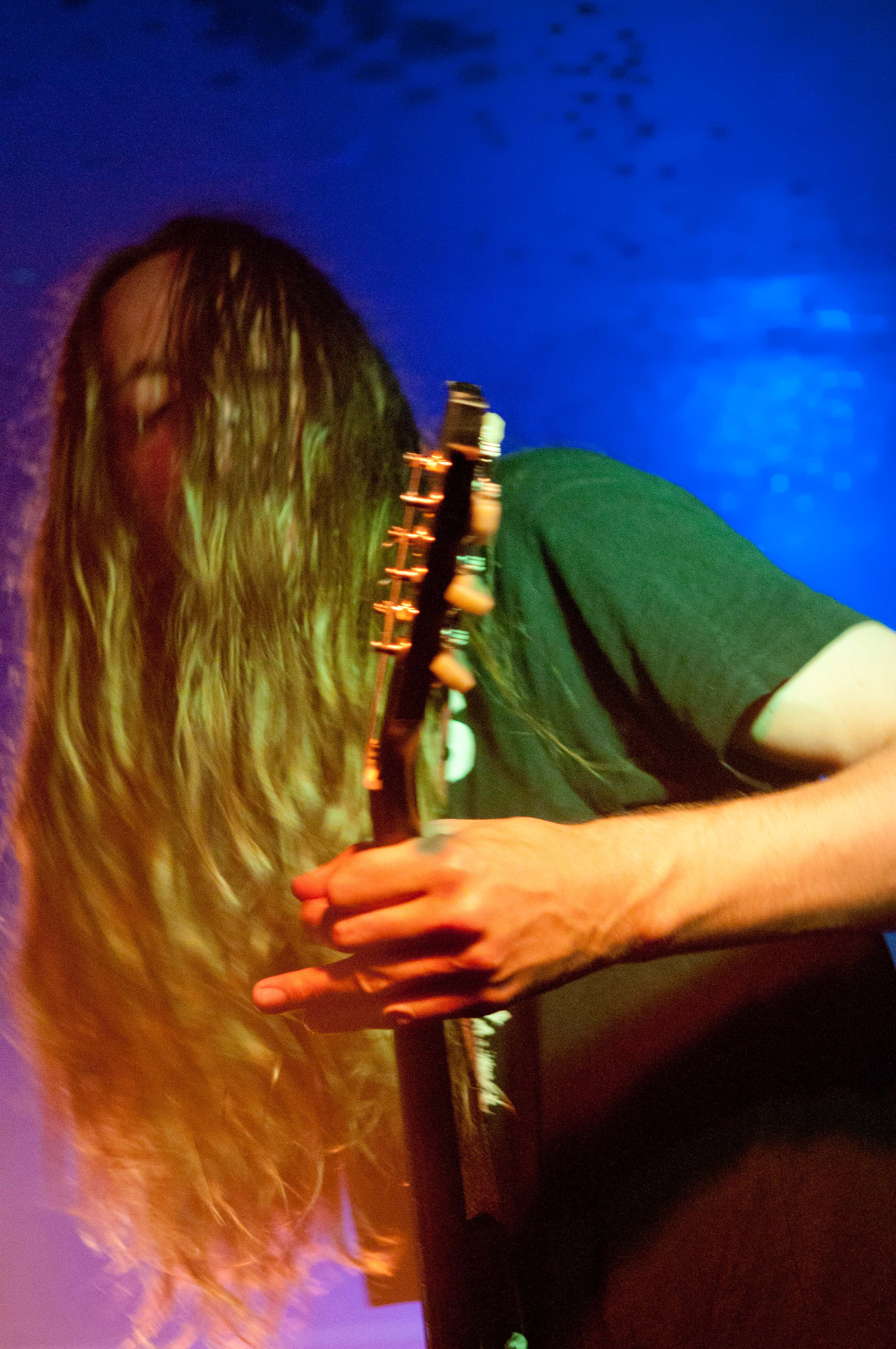
Guitarist, Auckland, January 2012

The Datsuns performed at Ozzfest in 2003 on the main stage supporting Ozzy Osbourne, Marilyn Manson, Korn and Disturbed. They also played the main stage of the 2004 and 2009 Big Day Out festivals, and opened for Metallica on their Australian tour in 2004. Metallica drummer Lars Ulrich had previously praised the Datsuns on the revival debut of Headbangers Ball, before playing their video for "In Love." Their second album, Outta Sight/Outta Mind (May 2004), was produced by Led Zeppelin member John Paul Jones. It reached no. 7 in New Zealand, top 50 in Australia and top 60 in the UK. Australian music journalist Ed Nimmervoll compared the first two albums, where during their studio sessions "[they] just pressed record and played the songs they'd been playing live. The lyrics for the first album were stream of consciousness, the lyrics for the second album [were] more considered having been refined while on the road."

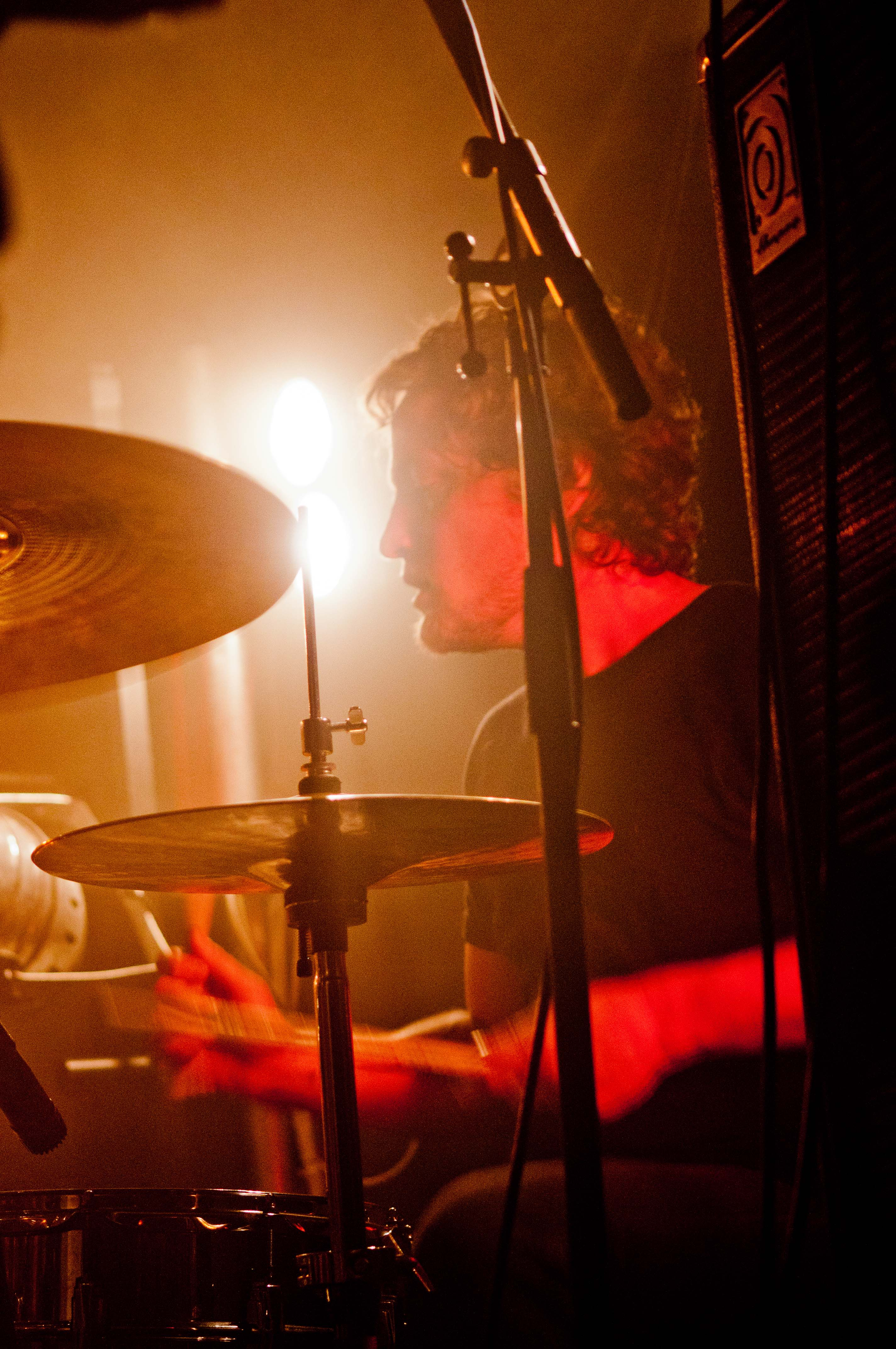
Ben Cole on drums, Auckland, January 2012

In October 2006 the Datsuns released their third album, Smoke & Mirrors, which peaked in the top 20 in New Zealand. The album was met with generally positive reviews, although it was not reviewed as widely as the band's first two efforts. Its lead single, "Stuck Here for Days" (2006), appeared in the top 30 in New Zealand. After the album's release, Osment was replaced on drums by Ben Cole – also from Cambridge. The Datsuns toured New Zealand with Shihad during the Christmas to New Year period in 2006 to 2007. The group relocated to Germany and completed a tour of Europe to promote Smoke & Mirrors. Although they mostly played in locations they previously had not visited, they managed to sell out the majority of their European dates.

The band's fourth album, Headstunts (an anagram of "the Datsuns"), was released on 6 October 2008. They toured New Zealand, Australia and North America, showcasing new material, "Eye of the Needle", "Human Error", "So Long", "Hey Paranoid People What's in Your Head", "Your Bones" and released a limited edition single, "Highschool Hoodlums". The quartet then embarked on a tour of the UK and the rest of Europe. The Datsuns' fifth studio album, Death Rattle Boogie, appeared in October 2012. It had been recorded in Stockholm at Gutterview Recorders, with additional work at Roundhead Studios in New Zealand, and was produced by former Hellacopters frontman Nicke Andersson. Their sixth studio album, Deep Sleep, was issued in October 2014, which reached New Zealand's top 30. The group toured Japan for the third time in March 2016.

Following a long period of inactivity, in February 2021 the band released the single "Brain To Brain": their first new music in seven years and a lead single for the album Eye To Eye, which was released on 28 May 2021.

== Discography ==
=== Albums ===
Year	Title	Details	Peak chart positions		
Year	Title	Details	NZ	AUS	UK
2002	The Datsuns	Released: 18 October 2002; Label: Hellsquad Records, In-Fidelity Recordings, V2 Records; Catalogue: HS009	1	73	17
2004	Outta Sight/Outta Mind	Released: 2 May 2004; Label: Hellsquad Records, V2 Records; Catalogue: HS022	7	41	58
2006	Smoke & Mirrors	Released: 2 October 2006; Label: Hellsquad Records, EMI, V2 Records; Catalogue: HS031	16	92	189
2008	Headstunts	Released: 12 October 2008; Label: Hellsquad Records, Cooking Vinyl; Catalogue: HS035	—	—	—
2012	Death Rattle Boogie	Released: 5 October 2012; Label: Hellsquad Records; Catalogue: HS037	—	—	—
2014	Deep Sleep	Released: 3 October 2014; Label: Hellsquad Records; Catalogue: HS039	26	—	—
2021	Eye to Eye	Released: 28 May 2021; Label: Hellsquad Records; Catalogue: HS043	—	—	—
2026	Moonstruck Man	To be released: 13 November 2026; Label: Hellsquad Records	TBA		
"—" denotes a recording that did not chart or was not released in that territory.

=== Extended plays ===
Year	Title	Details
2003	MF from Hell	Released: 25 March 2003; Label: Hellsquad, V2 Records; Catalogue: HS014, HS015
2003	Harmonic Generator	Released: April 9 2003; Label: V2 Records
2006	Stuck Here for Days	Released: 25 June 2006; Label: Hellsquad Records, EMI, V2 Records; Catalogue: HS028
"—" denotes a recording that did not chart or was not released in that territory.

=== Singles ===
Year	Title	Peak chart positions			Album
Year	Title	NZ	AUS	UK	Album
2000	"Super Gyration"	—	—	—	Non-album single
2001	"Fink for the Man"	—	—	—	The Datsuns
2001	"Lady"	—	—	—	The Datsuns
2002	"In Love"	—	—	25	The Datsuns
2002	"Harmonic Generator"	—	—	33	The Datsuns
2003	"MF from Hell"	—	—	55	The Datsuns
2004	"Blacken My Thumb"	—	100	48	Outta Sight/Outta Mind
2004	"Girls Best Friend"	—	—	71	Outta Sight/Outta Mind
2006	"Stuck Here for Days"	23	—	—	Smoke & Mirrors
2006	"System Overload"	—	—	145	Smoke & Mirrors
2008	"High School Hoodlums"	—	—	—	Head Stunts
2008	"Human Error"	—	—	—	Head Stunts
2009	"So Long"	—	—	—	Head Stunts
2011	"Gods Are Bored"	—	—	—	Death Rattle Boogie
2014	"Bad Taste"	—	—	—	Deep Sleep
2021	"Brain to Brain"	— (Note: "Brain to Brain" did not enter the NZ Top 40 Singles Chart, but peaked at number 27 on the NZ Hot Singles Chart.)	—	—	Eye to Eye
"—" denotes a recording that did not chart or was not released in that territory.
