= Diviner (album) =

Studio album by Hayden Thorpe
- Released: 24 May 2019
- Recorded: 2018
- Studios: Thorpe's flat in Walthamstow, London and at Leo Abrahams' studio in Cornwall
- Length: 37:10
- Label: Domino
- Producer: Leo Abrahams

Hayden Thorpe studio albums chronology
Diviner (2019)	Moondust for My Diamond (2021)

Singles from Diviner
- 1. "Diviner" Released: 21 February 2019; 2. "Love Crimes" Released: 9 April 2019; 3. "Earthly Needs" Released: 20 May 2019

Diviner is the debut studio album by English musician Hayden Thorpe. It was released on 24 May 2019 by Domino Recording Company.

Diviner is the first solo work from Thorpe since the dissolution of Wild Beasts, a band which Thorpe was a member of for over fifteen years. The album was written by Hayden Thorpe in Los Angeles, London, Kendal, and Cornwall. It was recorded over the course of 2018 with producer and close friend Leo Abrahams at Thorpe's London flat and at Abrahams' studio in Cornwall. The album's musical style is more stripped down compared to Thorpe's previous work. It was preceded by the singles "Diviner", "Love Crimes", and "Earthly Needs".

== Background and recording ==
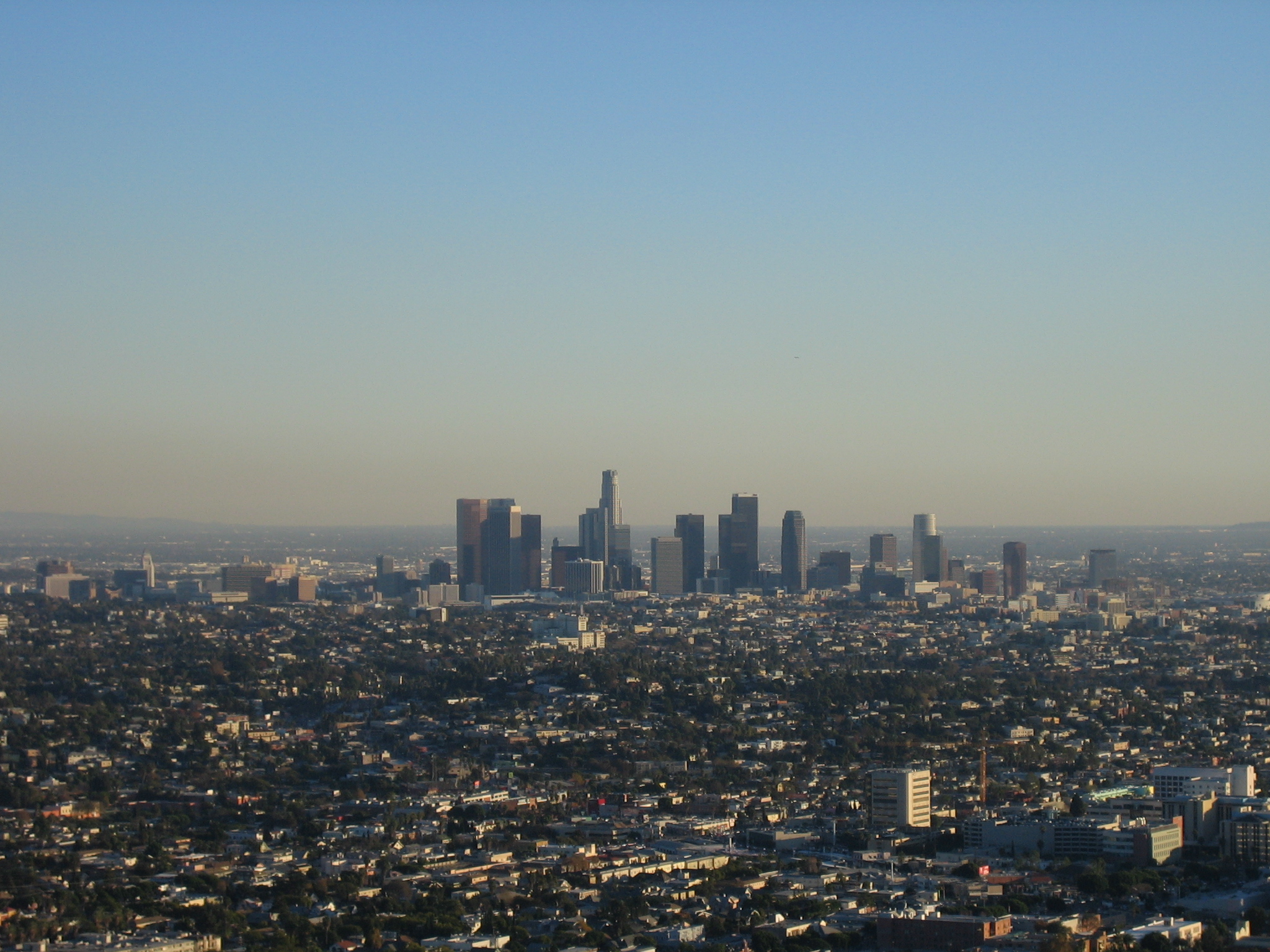
Thorpe moved to Los Angeles for a few months and wrote the album's title track.

Hayden Thorpe and the three other members of Wild Beasts met in a pub during their 2016 Christmas break and mutually decided to disband. The band played shows together in 2017 in support of their fifth album Boy King, including a date at Glastonbury Festival, but they did not publicly announce their split until 25 September 2017. Wild Beasts played their final show on 17 February 2018 at the Hammersmith Apollo in London.

Diviner was written by Hayden Thorpe in California, Thorpe's flat in Walthamstow, London, Thorpe's childhood home in Kendal, and in Cornwall. The album was recorded over the course of 2018 with producer and close friend Leo Abrahams at Thorpe's London flat and at Abrahams' studio in Cornwall. In January 2017, Thorpe flew to Los Angeles, explaining he wanted to escape the Cumbria winters and needed a place to "suspend reality" for enough time to deal with the breakup of Wild Beasts. In Los Angeles, he spent time alone in a flat writing with only a piano and his voice. He had become uncomfortable with the idea of relying on computers to create music, having felt "outmoded" by the other members of Wild Beasts as they became "better at using a computer and producing". He felt the piano provided him with "order and stability". He wrote the album's opening title track, "Diviner", during his time in Los Angeles. Thorpe's time in Los Angeles, which lasted a few months, was spent writing in "secret" because he was contractually not permitted to tell others that Wild Beasts had disbanded. He returned to his flat in Walthamstow and began writing for a period which he called "a time of vast aloneness". Around the half-way point of the creation of Diviner, Thorpe developed a peritonsillar abscess, a tonsil infection. He travelled back to his father's home in Kendal and eventually went to Accident & Emergency, where he lost his voice entirely. He spent time recovering in his childhood home and eventually began to continue work on the album, playing the piano he grew up with and learned to play on and slowly regaining his voice.

== Musical style and themes ==
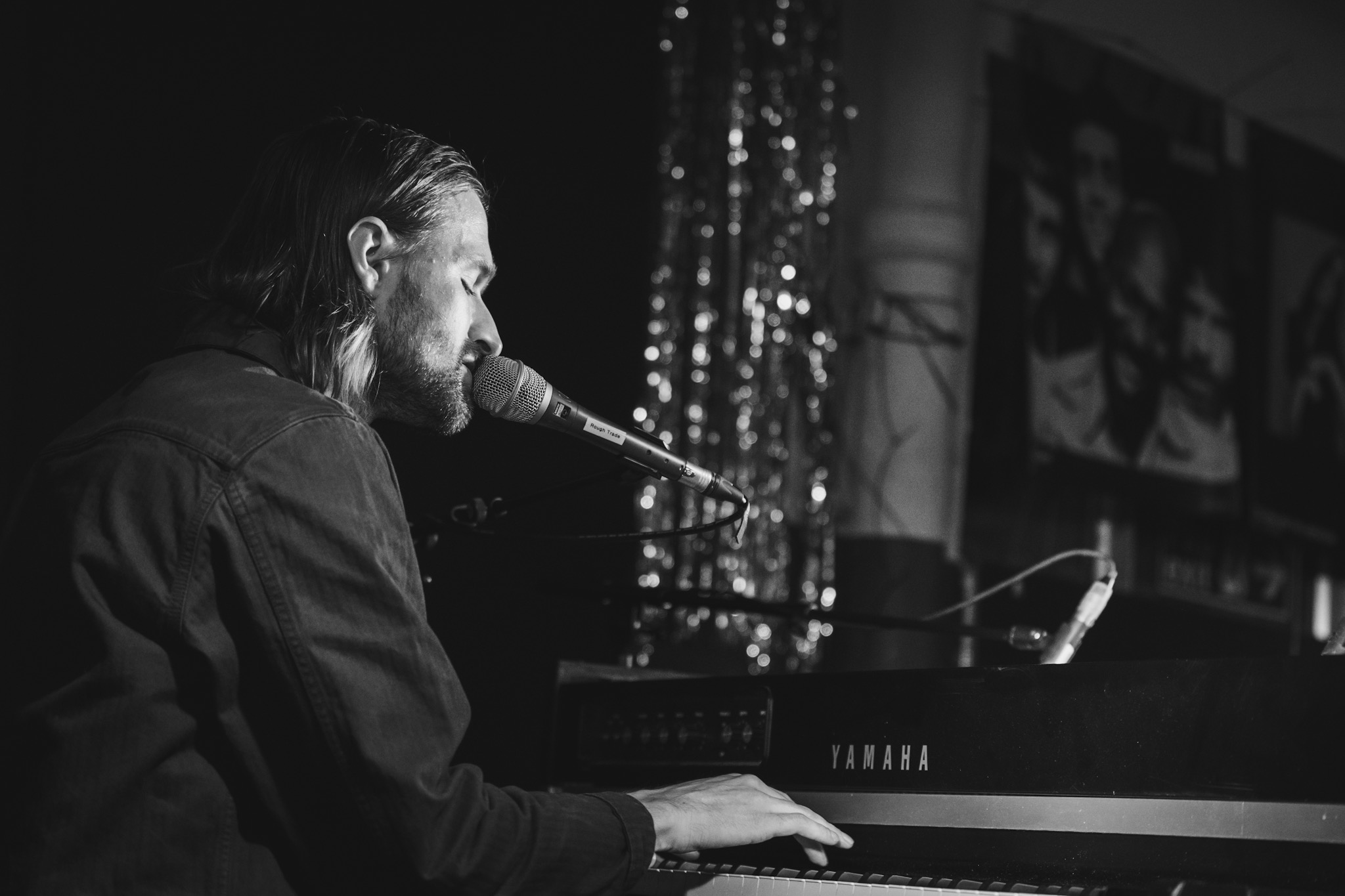
Hayden Thorpe performing solo on piano at Rough Trade East in London on 25 May 2019.

Diviner marks a departure from Thorpe's previous work, from the layered art rock and baroque pop style of Wild Beasts releases to a more direct and stripped down musical style. The album is characterized by sparse arrangements, featuring piano-based ballads that emphasize Thorpe's vocals and piano work. The songs are also backed by flourishes of ambient synthesizers, guitars, and bass. The album sees Thorpe trading the more bombastic, falsetto vocal style he exercised with Wild Beasts for a gentle croon. "Spherical Time" is an ambient, drone-like instrumental track. It features a piano loop that was written by Thorpe at the age of sixteen on the piano in Thorpe's childhood home. The loop existed as his "reboot chord sequence", which he used to test out new pianos and perform soundchecks.

The sensuality found with Wild Beasts' melodies and lyrics is another point of difference for Diviner. In an interview with Dork, Thorpe stated, "I don't think it was a conscious shift, but complete solitude is pretty unsexy. The sexual energy that emanated from Wild Beasts' work was definitely the by-product of men together, the ego dynamics and the chemistry of four boys putting their position out to the world. The removal of that scenario definitely meant my horn has retracted, as it were. There is sexuality within Diviner, but it's a far more vulnerable, gentler sexuality. I also think society's climate is different – I don't know if the white heterosexual position is really an important one right now." In comparison, Diviner is a much more insular project. It seeks strength not from companionship but from faith in the "order of the universe". This is a reference to Thorpe's belief that every person's path is predestined, that some things are meant to be. This sense of surrendering yourself to such eventualities is a central theme of Diviner and heavily informed its creation.

== Release and promotion ==
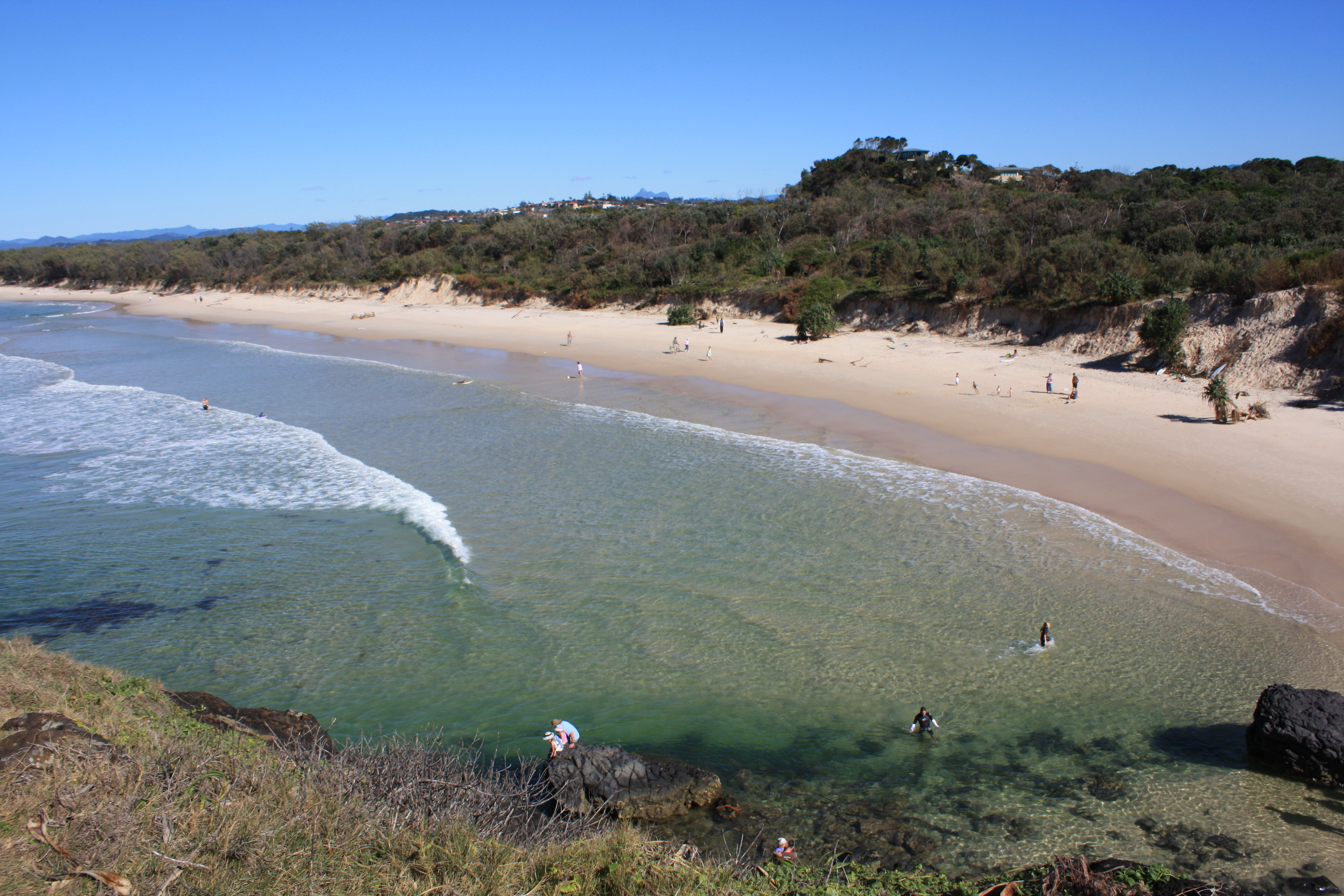
Thorpe was granted permission to shoot the music video for "Love Crimes" at Dreamtime Beach in New South Wales, Australia.

"Diviner" was released as the album's first single with an accompanying music video on 21 February 2019. The music video for "Diviner" was directed by Crowns & Owls and features Thorpe playing on an old piano in the forest at night. "Love Crimes" was released as the album's second single on 9 April 2019 with an accompanying music video and the announcement of Diviner. The music video for "Love Crimes" was directed by Alexandra Liveris and shot on Dreamtime Beach in northern New South Wales, Australia in response to a vision Thorpe received from a psychic. The psychic told Thorpe, whose mother is Australian and descended from convicts in Australia, that Australia would feature in his future. "Earthly Needs" was released as the album's third single on 20 May 2019.

Between 14 May 2019 and 6 June 2019, Thorpe performed five intimate shows entitled The Piano Room Sessions, performed solely on piano. Performed in Paris, London, Berlin, New York, and Los Angeles, the venues were revealed to ticket winners only 48 hours beforehand. Thorpe has said that he does not plan to perform Wild Beasts songs in the future, explaining, "Those songs exist, and if they matter to anyone then you can't take that away from anyone. That's the beauty of music. That it can't erode, they won't decay. But certainly, from my point of view, it wouldn't be a nourishing thing to do."

== Artwork ==
The album's artwork and packaging features photography credited to London-based artists Adam Broomberg and Oliver Chanarin Thorpe is friends with Oliver Chanarin. The two talked of working together for years and eventually planned a photoshoot for the album's artwork. On the day of the shoot, Thorpe was riding his bicycle along Regent's Canal en route to Chanarin's studio when he fell off his bike. He emerged relatively unscathed, aside from a trace of blood under his index finger. When Thorpe arrived at the studio, Chanarin immediately began shooting. The trace of blood is visible on the album's artwork.

== Critical reception ==
Professional ratings
Aggregate scores
Source	Rating
AnyDecentMusic?	7.7/10
Metacritic	81/100
Review scores
Source	Rating
The 405	7.5/10
Clash	8/10
DIY	4/5 stars
The Line of Best Fit	10/10
Mojo	4/5 stars
musicOMH	4/5 stars
NME	4/5 stars
Pitchfork	6.8/10
Q	4/5 stars
Uncut	8/10

Diviner received positive reviews from critics upon its release. At Metacritic, which assigns a normalised rating out of 100 to reviews from mainstream publications, the album received an average score of 81, based on 11 reviews.

Writing for The Line of Best Fit, Ross Horton gave the album a perfect score, calling it "evidently, demonstrably and obviously a flawless work of genius, and may just be one of the best albums this writer has heard this decade." Writing for Uncut, Louis Pattison said, "Diviner retains much of what Wild Beasts did best." Victoria Segal of Mojo said, "Diviner came out of post-band convalescence and a spell of recalibration, yet for all the intense, cocooning introspection in these songs, Thorpe is obviously more than ready to face the world alone." Writing for DIY, Lisa Wright said, "Diviner is an intensely intimate album that leaves Hayden with nowhere to hide. Thankfully, stepping fully into the spotlight and laying himself bare, he's resplendent."

Niall Doherty of Q said, "It's a restrained record that doesn't suffocate its epic songs with epic instrumentation" and that "it's the best fresh start that Hayden Thorpe could have hoped for." Jordan Bassett of NME said, "Wild Beasts sometimes seemed overly enamoured with ideology, self-aware to a fault, while Thorpe's solo album is simpler, more direct, more self-contained – and therein lies its power." Writing for Pitchfork, Patric Fallon said, "Some of its songs are so intimate that their meanings seem all but impossible for an outsider to parse. But in the moments when he decides to push his music out into the light, Thorpe's self-searching takes on a shape we can all recognize." Nick Roseblade of Clash said, "Diviner is a brave album and Thorpe should be commended for it. It challenges what masculinity should be and that you don't have to shout to get your message across." Writing for Loud and Quiet, Joe Goggins praised the album and said, "Whilst there's the occasional throwback to the vaudevillian theatrics of Limbo, Panto here ('Love Crimes' is probably the best example) this is an album that vocally most resembles Smother or Present Tense. But that, in terms of its voice, is a fresh proposition entirely."

In a less favourable review, Celine Teo-Blockey of Under the Radar called Thorpe's lyricism "exquisite" but said, "Bereft of the signature production of Wild Beasts, and the counterbalance of Fleming's weighty baritone, Thorpe's limited vocal range is glaring."

== Track listing ==
All tracks are written by Hayden Thorpe, except where noted.

No.	Title	Writer(s)	Length
1.	"Diviner"	Hayden Thorpe; SOHN	3:23
2.	"Straight Lines"		3:43
3.	"Earthly Needs"		4:13
4.	"Love Crimes"		3:55
5.	"Stop Motion"		4:15
6.	"In My Name"		3:38
7.	"Anywhen"		4:14
8.	"Human Knot"		3:20
9.	"Spherical Time"		2:52
10.	"Impossible Object"		3:37
Total length:			37:10

== Personnel ==
Credits adapted from liner notes.

Musicians

- Hayden Thorpe – vocals, piano, Rhodes, guitar, bass, synths, programming
- Leo Abrahams – guitar, synths, bass, programming, string arrangement
- Stella Mozgawa – drums, percussion
- Emma Smith – violin
- Josephine Stephenson – backing vocals (2, 3)

Packaging

- Adam Broomberg and Oliver Chanarin (courtesy of Lisson Gallery) – photography
- Matthew Cooper – design

Technical

- Leo Abrahams – production (for Solar Management, recording of piano (at Coronet Street Studios, London)
- Lexxx – mixing, programming, recording of piano (at The Barn, Sussex)
- Giles Smith – recording of drums (at Lightship)
- Benge – recording of modular synths (at MemeTune Studios, London)
- Matt Colton – mastering (at Alchemy Mastering, London)

== Charts ==
Chart (2019)	Peak position
Scottish Albums (Official Charts)	81
UK Album Downloads (Official Charts)	80
UK Independent Albums (Official Charts)	16
