= Forest Swords =

English record producer, composer, and DJ

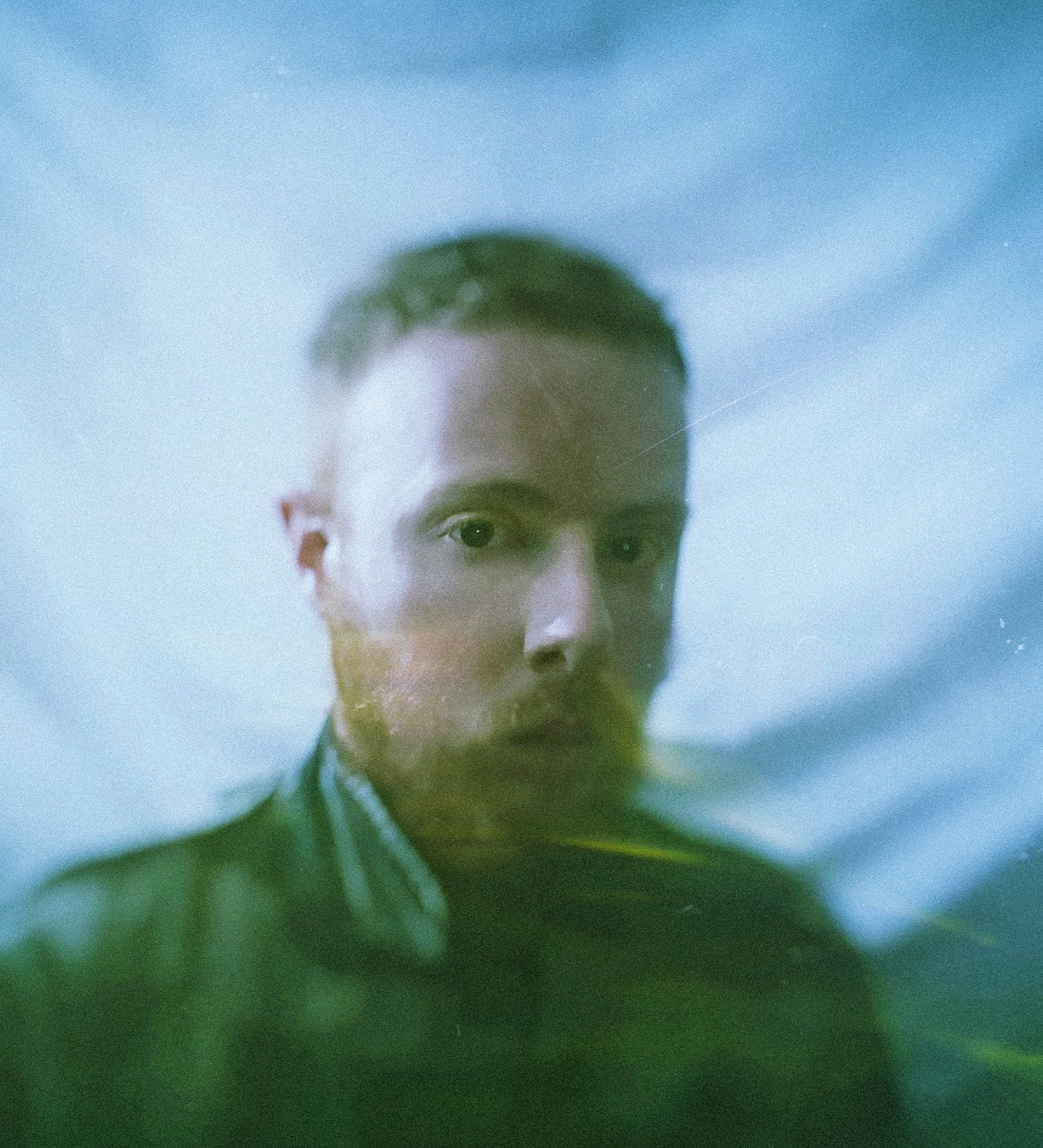
- Matthew Barnes (Forest Swords) in 2017

Background information
- Born: Matthew Edward Barnes
- Origin: The Wirral, England
- Genres: Experimental; electronic; dub
- Occupations: Musician; record producer; composer; DJ
- Labels: Ninja Tune; Dense Truth; No Pain in Pop; Olde English Spelling Bee; Tri Angle
- Website: forestswords.co.uk

Matthew Edward Barnes, known by his stage name Forest Swords, is an English record producer, composer, DJ, and artist. As of 2026, he has released three studio albums, two EPs, and several scores for film, television, and video games.

== Career ==
=== Dagger Paths EP ===
Forest Swords's debut six-track EP, Dagger Paths, was originally released in March 2010, before being reissued later that year with additional tracks. FACT Magazine named it their album of the year. It received an 8.4 rating on music website Pitchfork and was No. 48 on their Albums of the Year list. It was rated 9/10 on music website Drowned in Sound, called "one of 2010's finest underground records" by NME, and chosen as a 'Hidden Gem of 2010' in The Guardian.

=== Engravings ===
Forest Swords' debut studio album, Engravings, was released through Tri Angle Records on 26 August 2013. Critical response was unanimously positive, with Pitchfork giving it an 8.5 Best New Music review and Resident Advisor a 4.5/5 review. Stereogum rated it at number 37 in their best albums of 2013 list, The Wire ranked it at number 35, Pitchfork at number 34, Clash rated it at number 21, Dummy Magazine at number 16, and Tiny Mix Tapes at number 10.

The video for "Thor's Stone" was directed by Dave Ma and made available online in September 2013. It featured Spanish dancer Guzman Rosado. A remix by dub artist Lee "Scratch" Perry was posted online in November.

A video for "The Weight of Gold", directed by French dancer and choreographer Benjamin Millepied, was posted online in February 2014 and featured dancer Billy Barry.

=== Compassion ===
The second Forest Swords album, Compassion, was released through Ninja Tune on 5 May 2017, with a video and streaming single release of lead track "Arms Out" and a set of worldwide festival and headline tour dates. The track "The Highest Flood" had previously been released as a standalone digital single.

Resident Advisor gave the album a 4.5/5 review, calling it "both sincere and sublime". Fake DIY called it "heart-stopping and thoroughly arresting" in a 4/5 review. DJ Mag gave it 4/5 and called it "a stunning vision, hypnotic". In an 8.5/10 review, The 405 called it "a brilliant album — well worth the four year wait". Q magazine gave it a strong 4/5 review and said it "unfolds like a journey through a bustling soundscape of found sounds, instrumental loops and post-dubstep production". The Loud & Quiet review stated the album is "arresting in its austerity" in an 8/10 review. Pitchfork rated the album at 7.8; "more ambitious and varied while retaining the uncanniness he's known for". PopMatters gave it a score of 8, saying, "A dazzling, evocative album that acts as the perfect soundtrack to the precarious times we live in". AV Club called it "passionately realized" in an A− review. Clash gave it an 8 out of 10 review, describing it as "wordless protest music that impresses with its sheer thematic ambition". Exclaim! awarded it 8/10, saying, "the goosebumps will cover most of your body". Sputnikmusic gave the album a 4.5 out of 5 'superb' rating, describing it as "nothing short of breathtaking". Gigsoup praised Compassion's "beautiful strings and rolling percussion" in an 86% review. In an 8 out of 10 review, Soundblab claimed Barnes has "developed a whole new language/style that other electronic musicians should be eager to take note of". The Age rated Compassion 4.5 out of 5, calling it "triumphant". It was Album of the Week on BBC 6Music and Bleep.

A single, featuring two tracks from the Compassion recording sessions—"Congregate" and "Free"—was released later that year, with all proceeds going to relief work in Mexico and Puerto Rico.

=== Bolted ===
On 11 July 2023, Barnes released a new single, "Butterfly Effect", through the Ninja Tune label. It was his first new material in five years and featured a previously unheard vocal sample from musician Neneh Cherry. His third album, Bolted, was announced in September 2023 and released on 20 October. The announcement was accompanied by two new tracks, "The Low" and "Caged".

The album has received positive reviews, including a 9/10 rating from The Line of Best Fit, 82% from Beats Per Minute, a review calling it "absolutely phenomenal" by The Quietus, 4/5 from AllMusic, and 8/10 from Clash magazine.

=== DJ-Kicks compilation and mixes ===
Barnes has created mixes for Fact, Unsound Festival, and Dazed, the last of which featured exclusive remixes of tracks by Björk and Anohni.

In 2018, Forest Swords curated and released a 27-track DJ-Kicks compilation through !K7 Records. The collection "draws a line between past inspirations and his current peers" and features one exclusive Forest Swords track called "Crow", as well as songs from artists like Dead Can Dance, Orbital, Laurel Halo, and Mira Calix. The album artwork was also designed by Forest Swords.

=== Remixes and production ===
Forest Swords has created remixes for Björk, Anohni, These New Puritans, Wild Beasts, and Gold Panda, amongst others. In 2012, he co-produced and co-wrote the single "Cold Nites" for How to Dress Well, from the album Total Loss, and went on to produce Barbadian rapper Haleek Maul's track "Lobo". Dyymond of Durham, a one-off collaborative project with Bavarian fine artist Otto Baerst, released a track on No Pain in Pop's vinyl compilation The Bedroom Club II.

In April 2014, Forest Swords recorded a BBC Radio 1 live session at Maida Vale Studios for Benji B.

Forest Swords co-produced the opening track on Ellie Goulding's 2020 album, Brightest Blue, featuring vocalist Serpentwithfeet.

=== Original composition and scoring work ===
In 2014, Barnes was commissioned to produce the trailer music for Ubisoft's video game title Assassin's Creed Rogue.

In 2015, the artist collaborated with Robert Del Naja from Massive Attack and Young Fathers on the score for La Fête (est Finie), a short film about climate change.

In 2016, Forest Swords released Shrine, the soundtrack for an original contemporary dance piece. The dance performance was streamed via Boiler Room and has toured European festivals, such as ReWire in The Hague.

In 2019, it was announced that Barnes had completed the soundtrack for the documentary film Ghosts of Sugar Land, directed by Bassam Tariq. The film won the Best Documentary Short award at the Sundance Film Festival, was nominated for the 2020 Academy Awards shortlist in the Documentary Short category, and was subsequently bought by Netflix.

Forest Swords composed the original soundtrack for The Machine Air, a film by director Liam Young, which was released in December 2019 through the Dense Truth label. The press release called the project "part art film, part performance piece" and "the first film to be both about and recorded by flying drones". The film originally premiered at the BFI Imax in Waterloo, London for the BFI London Film Festival.

In 2020, Barnes composed music for islands, a dance piece choreographed by Emma Portner and performed by members of the Norwegian National Ballet. It premiered at the Oslo Opera House as part of the Norwegian National Ballet Festival.

Barnes composed music for the Ghost Light exhibition at NAK in Aachen, Germany in 2021 by artist Thomas Dosal, a 28-audio channel and light installation using manipulated audio ripped from the artist's smartphone.

Also in 2021, he collaborated with Liam Young once more on a quadraphonic original score for the documentary film installation Planet City for the NGV arts institution in Melbourne, Australia.

In 2022, he composed the original score for the documentary film Dogwatch, by Greek filmmaker Gregory Rentis.

Barnes composed and performed the original soundtrack for the 2022 adventure video game As Dusk Falls, developed by Interior Night and published by Xbox Game Studios. Rolling Stone wrote that the game "features one of the best musical scores we've ever heard".

In 2023, he wrote the original score for the film Stephen by visual artist Melanie Manchot.

Barnes composed original music for an opera production of the Greek tragedy Fedra, directed by Paul Curran, performed at the Teatro Greco in Syracuse, Italy, in 2024. In 2025, he composed the original score for the film Wasteman.

=== Artwork ===
Matthew Barnes is also a graphic designer, with work featured in Creative Review, Grafik, and Dazed & Confused. He has mentioned in interviews that design and visual art are key influencers to his music. A special edition of the Engravings album is available with an additional twenty-page booklet of Barnes' original photography. The cover artwork, designed by the artist himself, was selected for Art Vinyl's 2013 Best Art Award, and Pitchfork included it in their top 25 album covers of 2013.

In 2011, at the Abandon Normal Devices festival, three new pieces, as part of a site-specific sound installation called Ground Rhythms, were cut to 12" X-ray film and performed on turntables at an event in Liverpool. The pieces were inspired by three architectural sites from Merseyside history that no longer exist, and the tracks on the brittle X-ray pressings were designed to be "played once only before degrading, never to be played again". The final copy of the X-ray vinyl was sold in December 2013 on eBay, with all proceeds going to the Philippines Typhoon Appeal. A second performance in the series took place at the AV Festival in Newcastle in 2012, inspired by demolished buildings in the northeast.

== Critical reception ==
In 2010, Pitchfork Media posted an article suggesting Barnes was part of a new generation of producer/composers, alongside James Blake, Mount Kimbie, Bon Iver, Burial, and Four Tet. A 2013 feature on The FADER website placed the Forest Swords project as a unique and contemporary strain of dub music, "worth endless listens, endless re-examinations, endless re-contextualizing", and stated that it "exists in that sweet spot of musical influence between everything and nothing".

== Discography ==
Studio albums

- Engravings (2013)
- Compassion (2017)
- Bolted (2023)

Original scoring

- Shrine: Original Dance Score (2016)
- The Machine Air: Original Score (2019)

EPs

- Fjree Feather (2009)
- Dagger Paths (2010)

Singles

- "Rattling Cage" (2010)
- "Congregate/Free" (2017)
- "Butterfly Effect" (2023)
- "Torch / Pearl of Hail" (2024)

Curated compilations

- Forest Swords – DJ-Kicks (2018)
