= Richard Formby =

British musician, engineer and producer

Richard Formby is a British musician, engineer and producer. As well as releasing his own solo music, he has been a member of various bands. Formby produced the albums Two Dancers (2009) and Smother (2011) by Wild Beasts, as well as Some Say I So I Say Light (2013) by Ghostpoet and News from Nowhere (2013) by Darkstar.

== Biography ==
Formby has released his own solo electronic experimental music as well as being a member of The Jazz Butcher and In Embrace. He was part of Peter Kember's post-Spaceman 3 project Spectrum, for the album Soul Kiss (Glide Divine) (1992).

He owns a studio in Leeds.

== Discography ==
=== Solo albums by Formby ===
- Outside the Angular Colony (Glass, 1981)
- The Machine Room (Bruton, 1999)
- I Was a Sleep But Now I Am a Wake (Golden Lab, 2005)
- Volume One (Mind Expansion, 2007)
- Sine (Preserved Sound, 2013)

=== Albums produced by Formby ===
- Taste (1989) by The Telescopes
- When in Rome, Kill Me (1989) by Cud
- Word of Mouth (2004) by The Blueskins
- Not on Top (2005) by Herman Dune
- Two Dancers (2009) by Wild Beasts – nominated for the Mercury Prize
- Smother (2011) by Wild Beasts
- The Shallows (2012) by I Like Trains
- Some Say I So I Say Light (2013) by Ghostpoet
- News from Nowhere (2013) by Darkstar
- Moondust for My Diamond (2021) by Hayden Thorpe
