= Moondust for My Diamond =

Studio album by Hayden Thorpe
- Released: 15 October 2021
- Genre: Electronic; synth-pop
- Length: 44:25
- Label: Domino
- Producer: Richard Formby; Nathan Jenkins; Hayden Thorpe

Hayden Thorpe studio albums chronology
Diviner (2019)	Moondust for My Diamond (2021)	Ness (2024)

Singles from Moondust for My Diamond
- 1. "The Universe Is Always Right" Released: 6 July 2021

Moondust for My Diamond is the second studio album by English musician Hayden Thorpe, released on 15 October 2021 through Domino Recording Company. It was produced by Richard Formby, Nathan Jenkins and Thorpe, and preceded by the single "The Universe Is Always Right", as well as the songs "Metafeeling", "Parallel Kingdom" and "Golden Ratio".

The album was reissued in an expanded edition, called the Every Piece of Dust Edition, on 19 August 2022, from which the song "Polygod" was released as a single.

== Background ==
In discussing the themes of the album, Thorpe explained that he wanted to explore "the meeting point between science and religion, the grand struggle for reality that shapes so much of our time". The album mostly abandons the piano ballad-dominated sound of Thorpe's solo debut album Diviner (2019) in favour of "synths, electronics, and softly-strummed guitars", moving into more overt electronic and synthpop territory.

Whilst out shopping in Los Angeles on Valentine's Day 2019, Thorpe purchased a Hagström Viking baritone guitar, which reignited his interest in playing guitar and set the impetus for the material that would appear on Moondust for My Diamond. Thorpe stated that "if the piano was my totem instrument for Diviner, then this guitar became the amulet for the new record." Thorpe reunited with Richard Formby, whom he had previously worked with whilst in Wild Beasts, for the recording sessions.

== Critical reception ==
Professional ratings
Aggregate scores
Source	Rating
Metacritic	77/100
Review scores
Source	Rating
AllMusic	3.5/5 stars
Beats Per Minute	62%
DIY	4/5 stars
The Line of Best Fit	8/10
PopMatters	4.5/5 stars

On review aggregator Metacritic, Moondust for My Diamond received a score of 76 out of 100 based on nine critics' reviews, indicating "generally favorable" reception. Ross Horton of The Line of Best Fit gave the album 8 out of 10 and called it a "very close second to its predecessor", 2019's Diviner, noting the difference from the previous album's use of piano, which is swapped out for "synth tones and programmed drums" on Moondust for My Diamond. Horton concluded that the record is "another essential album from a man who couldn't make a bad one if he tried". Writing for AllMusic, Heather Phares remarked that while the album's "smoothness sometimes make [it] a little less immediate than Diviner, it's the perfect complement to that album's somber reflections and another confident step forward in [Thorpe's] creative journey".

Joe Goggins of DIY awarded the album four out of five stars and felt that "on this second full-length from Hayden, there's evidence of real progression. The fairly austere palette that he embraced on Diviner is swapped out for warm, burbling synths" on Moondust for My Diamond. Reviewing the album for PopMatters, Ben Hogwood complimented Thorpe for his songwriting, writing that he has "the confidence to use a 'less is more' approach to powerful effect. Every musical inflection is carefully applied but there remains an instinctive feel", as well as his singing, opining that he "continues to sing beautifully but if anything his slightly reserved approach heightens the emotional impact". Hogwood concluded that Thorpe "has without doubt made one of the albums of the year".

Jeremy J. Fisette of Beats Per Minute found that although the album is Thorpe's "first solo effort that doesn't really sound like a Wild Beasts album", it "still suffers from a bit of a momentum issue", with "some of the lyrics and ideas here feel[ing] a bit undercooked". Fisette stated that while the album "does offer some nice expansions on themes and compositional ideas from his debut[, ...] too much of Moondust for My Diamond gets lost in its own glittery haze".

== Track listing ==
All tracks are written by Hayden Thorpe.

Moondust for My Diamond track listing
No.	Title	Length
1.	"Material World"	3:58
2.	"The Universe Is Always Right"	4:04
3.	"No Such Thing"	3:45
4.	"Parallel Kingdom"	3:28
5.	"Golden Ratio"	4:27
6.	"Metafeeling"	4:21
7.	"Supersensual"	3:10
8.	"Hotel November Tango"	4:07
9.	"Rational Heartache"	3:49
10.	"Spherical Time II"	2:35
11.	"Suspended Animation"	3:21
12.	"Runaway World"	3:20
Total length:		44:25

Moondust for My Diamond – Every Piece of Dust Edition additional tracks
No.	Title	Length
13.	"Polygod"	3:01
14.	"Cast in Silver"	2:41
15.	"In the Drift"	4:02
16.	"Outside In"	2:45
17.	"The Universe Is Always Right" (Hinako Omori remix)	6:18
18.	"Parallel Kingdom" (Nakhane remix)	4:12
19.	"Golden Ratio" (Deep Throat Choir remix)	3:53
20.	"Metafeeling" (James Adrian Brown remix)	3:47
Total length:		75:04

== Charts ==
Chart performance for Moondust for My Diamond
Chart (2021)	Peak position
Scottish Albums (OCC)	99
UK Independent Albums (OCC)	36
