= Last Night All My Dreams Came True =

Live album by Wild Beasts
- Released: 16 February 2018
- Studio: RAK Studios
- Length: 52:29
- Label: Domino

Wild Beasts chronology
Punk Drunk & Trembling (2017)	Last Night All My Dreams Came True (2018)

Professional ratings
Aggregate scores
Source	Rating
Metacritic	73/100
Review scores
Source	Rating
AllMusic	3.5/5 stars
Dork	4/5 stars
The Independent	3/5 stars
The Line of Best Fit	7.5/10
The Observer	3/5 stars

Last Night All My Dreams Came True is a live album by British indie rock band Wild Beasts. It was released 16 February 2018, under Domino Recording Company.

== Production ==
The album was recorded live over a two-day period at RAK Studios.

== Critical reception ==
Last Night All My Dreams Came True was met with "generally favorable" reviews from critics. At Metacritic, which assigns a weighted average rating out of 100 to reviews from mainstream publications, this release received an average score of 73, based on 12 reviews. Aggregator Album of the Year gave the release a 72 out of 100 based on a critical consensus of 9 reviews.

Andy Gill from The Independent wrote: "It's a burly collection, with the band's flanged guitars and proggy synths asserting their refusal to follow any set style, and Hayden Thorpe's bristling vocals similarly stretching indie constraints; but when the only "new" track is jerry-rigged together from two old tracks, it all seems a bit unnecessary." Steven Loftin from The Line of Best Fit praised the vocals from the album, by saying: "The vocals of Hayden Thorpe and Tom Fleming, entwining with their falsetto and baritone beauty respectively, have always been impeccable in a live setting, and it's great to hear this forever immortalised as they run through key cuts from their back catalogue here." Phil Mongredien from The Observer stated: "It's unfortunate that [the album] draws rather so heavily on material from 2016's Boy King, the first Wild Beasts album on which memorable moments were in short supply. It all adds up to a slightly anticlimactic exit for a great band."

== Track listing ==
Last Night All My Dreams Came True track listing
No.	Title	Length
1.	"Wanderlust"	4:52
2.	"Big Cat"	3:19
3.	"A Simple Beautiful Truth"	2:28
4.	"2BU"	4:22
5.	"Bed of Nails"	4:08
6.	"Hooting & Howling"	4:38
7.	"This Is Our Lot"	4:25
8.	"He the Colossus"	4:23
9.	"The Devil's Palace"	3:43
10.	"Alpha Female"	3:46
11.	"Get My Bang"	3:34
12.	"All the King's Men"	3:59
13.	"Celestial Creatures"	4:54

== Charts ==
Chart performance for Last Night All My Dreams Came True
Chart (2018)	Peak position
Scottish Albums (OCC)	81
UK Independent Albums (OCC)	12
