= Liam Young =

Australian film director and architect (born 1979)

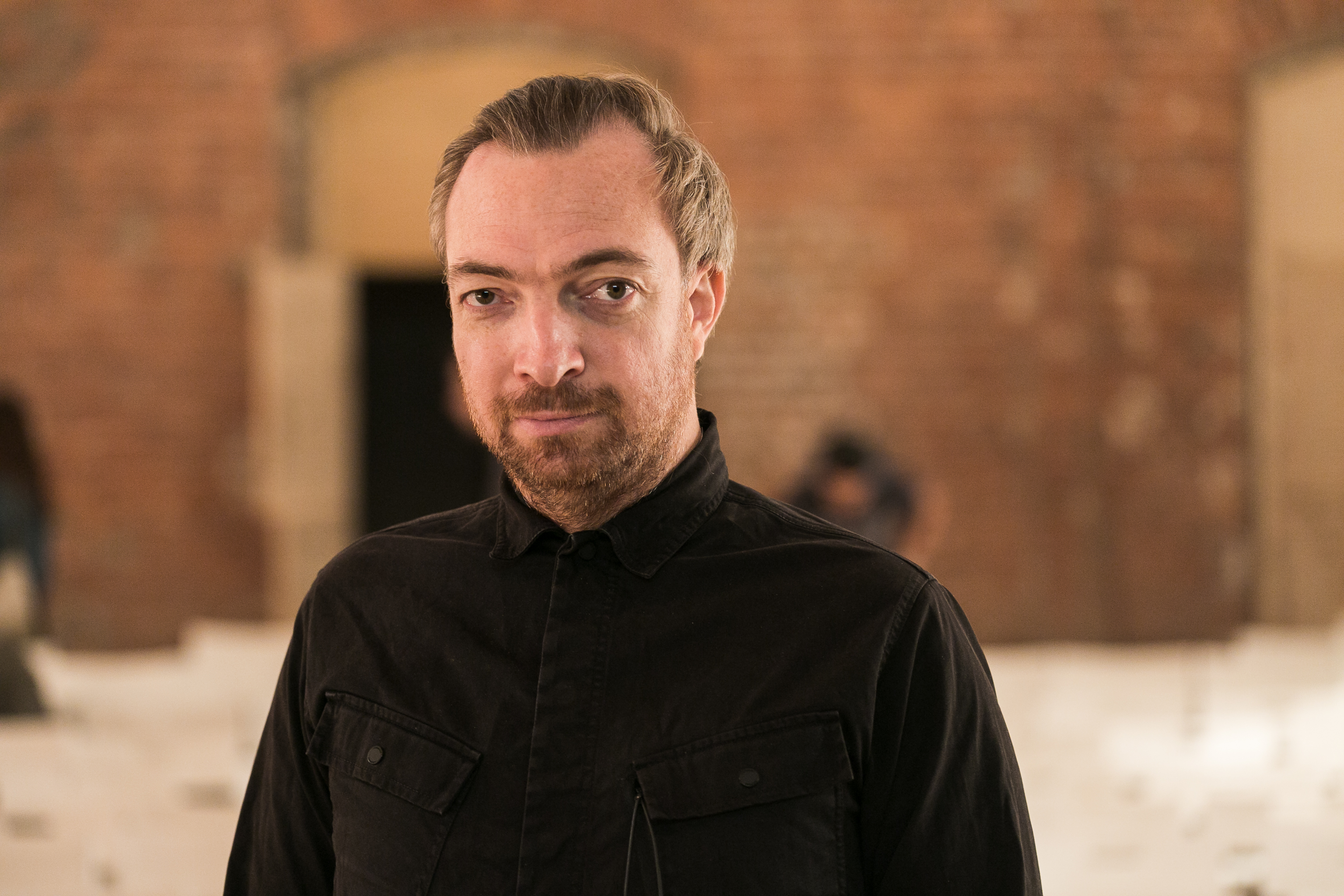
- Young in 2017
- Born: 13 March 1979 (age 47); Australia
- Occupations: Film director; architect
- Website: liamyoung.org

Liam Young is an Australian-born film director and architect.

Young has described his approach as that of an architect who works like a science fiction author or futurist.

== Career ==
Young is a founder of the Urban Futures think tank Tomorrow's Thoughts Today and the nomadic research studio Unknown Fields. Young was previously a visiting professor of architecture at Princeton University, currently holds a position at the Architectural Association in London, and heads the Master of Arts (MA) in Fiction and Entertainment program at the Southern California Institute of Architecture with Alexey Marfin in Los Angeles.

== Films ==
Young has developed a body of short films that use new technologies of image-making to tell new kinds of stories about the technologies' implications for urban life. He has pioneered the use of drones and laser scanners in narrative filmmaking. In Wired Magazine's review of three of his films, it was noted that what makes Young's sci-fi films unusual is that the technologies in focus are not just tools of making, but are the stars themselves. With his background in architecture, Young's films are noted for the way the cities in which they are set become characters in themselves.

In 2016, Young released the science fiction short film Where The City Can't See, the first fiction film to be shot entirely using laser scanning technology (Lidar), the same vision system that driverless cars use to navigate. The story follows a group of young factory workers on a single night as they drift through a near-future Detroit in a driverless taxi. They are part of an underground community that has developed new textiles for digital camouflage, which they use to escape the surveillance systems of the city and seek out a hidden rave in an abandoned factory. The film features an original soundtrack by DJ Stingray, former tour DJ for the Detroit electronic band Drexciya.

Young directed In the Robot Skies, the first fiction film produced using autonomous preprogrammed drones. In the film, government surveillance drones follow two characters through the towers of a future London public housing estate. Seen through the eyes of the flying cameras, the film tells the story of a young woman who has hacked one of the drones and uses it to pass love letters to her boyfriend who is trapped in the tower opposite. The film premiered as part of Channel 4's Random Acts series and was awarded a Silver Palm at the 2017 Mexico International Film Festival.

In 2016, Young co-produced the documentary short Consumed, which received a BAFTA nomination for Best British Documentary Short. The film is a cinematic journey through the landscapes, mines, factories, and shipyards of Chinese technology production. The film reveals the hidden world behind everyday objects and reframes the complex supply chains that fuel Western consumerism.

In 2015, Young developed the animated series New City, a series of high-resolution animated cityscapes that are exhibited as large-scale projections. Accompanying each film is a short story written by a range of science fiction authors including Jeff Noon, Tim Maughan, and Pat Cadigan. Developed from images and photographs Young collected on a series of expeditions around the world, the panoramas are extrapolations of the everyday world and, like much of his work, create fictions from fact. Music for the series was by Coldcut.

Young's film Renderlands, about the outsourced render farms and animation studios in India that produce most Hollywood films, was funded by the Graham Foundation and released in 2017.

In 2019, he directed the film The Machine Air, which featured a score by Forest Swords.

== Performances ==
In 2014, Young collaborated with Welsh musician and composer John Cale, formerly of the Velvet Underground, to develop the world's first drone orchestra and the audiovisual performance LOOP >> 60 Hz: Transmissions From The Drone Orchestra. For the performance, Young designed a flock of costumed drones that would fly above the audience carrying speakers that broadcast the live music played by the band. As The Guardian notes, the project "brings drones out of the realms of sinister terrorist surveillance and Amazon delivery and puts them in front of your face like massive alien gnats". In a review of the performance in The Telegraph, the collaboration was described as "demented joy", a cross between an amateur airshow and a rock concert.

With British electronic producer Forest Swords Young developed In the Robot Skies, a live cinema performance of his short film of the same name. Against the backdrop of Forest Swords's original soundscape and a film collage directed by Young, he narrates the story of a lone drone flying across time and space. Beginning in World War I the performance tells the story of how drones have evolved over time to become the dominant infrastructure they are today. The performance premiered at the 60th London International Film Festival.

== Publications ==
Young has co-authored the book series Unknown Fields: Tales From the Dark Side of the City. The series consists of 6 books, each an illustrated story based on a field expedition through a remote landscape that is critical to the manufacture and production of contemporary technology. A number of the books have been serialised on the BBC, such as A World Adrift: South China Seas to Inner Mongolia, which was developed as 3 articles exploring the landscapes of modern technologies and written in collaboration with author Tim Maughan. One of the stories, focused around a radioactive lake discovered in the research for the book, was part of the BBC's Best of 2015 list.

In 2014 Young edited the ebook Brave New Now, a collection of specially commissioned short stories set in a fictional future city; the stories were developed by Young for the 2013 Lisbon Architecture Triennale. The book features stories from science fiction authors such as Warren Ellis, Bruce Sterling, Rachel Armstrong, and Samit Basu, with photography by Edward Burtynsky, Charlie Koolhaas and Vincent Fournier.

== Exhibitions ==
Young's first solo US show opened at the Columbia University Arthur Ross Architecture Gallery in March 2017. The show was titled New Romance and featured three short films, each a love story set in a future city of autonomous technologies. The exhibition used the medium of film and fiction to explore how emerging technologies are redefining human relationships and architecture. The worlds of each of the three films are extrapolations of the trends and weak signals of our present relationship to technology. The films presented a dystopian future of ubiquitous technology; but, no matter how bleak, the stories attempt to show that we could still imagine ways to bend technology to our will or escape from it through tiny acts of resistance.

With his nomadic studio Unknown Fields, Young exhibited Unknown Fields: The Dark Side of the City at the Architectural Association Gallery in 2016. The exhibition took the form of a road trip through a collection of fragments: of drone footage, hidden camera investigations, speculative narratives, and toxic objects that formed a reimagined city the size of the entire planet. The project looks at the way that the supply chains of technology are reforming landscapes all over the world. One of the works in the exhibition, Rare Earthenware, a set of radioactive vases made from of toxic waste generated in the production of technology, has since been acquired by the Victoria and Albert Museum for their ceramics collection in London.

== Filmography ==
- 2013: Chupan Chupai (Short; producer)
- 2014: New City (Video installation, director)
- 2016: Where the City Can't See (Short; director)
- 2016: In the Robot Skies (Short; director)
- 2016: Consumed (Short; producer)
- 2017: Taobao Village (Video installation; co-director with Alexey Marfin)
