= Vincent Fournier =

Vincent Fournier may refer to:

- Vincent Fournier (footballer) (born 1961), Swiss football defender
- Vincent Fournier (photographer) (born 1970), French artist photographer
- Alice Cooper, the stage name of Vincent Damon Furnier
