= Present Tense (Wild Beasts album) =

Studio album by Wild Beasts
- Released: 24 February 2014
- Recorded: Konk Studios in London and at The Distillery in Bath, Somerset
- Genres: Indie rock, dream pop, synthpop
- Length: 40:55
- Label: Domino
- Producers: Lexxx, Leo Abrahams, Wild Beasts

Wild Beasts chronology
Smother (2011)	Present Tense (2014)	Boy King (2016)

Singles from Present Tense
- 1. "Wanderlust" Released: 24 February 2014; 2. "A Simple Beautiful Truth" Released: 19 May 2014; 3. "Mecca" Released: 4 August 2014

Professional ratings
Aggregate scores
Source	Rating
AnyDecentMusic?	8.1/10
Metacritic	86/100
Review scores
Source	Rating
AllMusic	4/5 stars
The Guardian	4/5 stars
The Independent	3/5 stars
Mojo	4/5 stars
NME	9/10
The Observer	4/5 stars
Pitchfork	8.2/10
Q	4/5 stars
Record Collector	4/5 stars
Uncut	9/10

Present Tense is the fourth studio album by Wild Beasts, released 24 February 2014 on Domino Recording Company. It was preceded by the single "Wanderlust" released on the same day.

== Background ==
Following a two-year-long world tour in promotion of their third album Smother, the band admitted to feelings of burn out by the experience and in late 2012 announced that they would take a year off from touring to concentrate on writing and recording the follow-up. Seeking a fresh approach, the band chose not to work with long-time producer Richard Formby, who had helmed the recording of Two Dancers and Smother, though they have not ruled out collaborating with him again in the future. Producers Leo Abrahams and Lexxx (who was also involved in the mixing of both records) were brought in to sharpen the band's focus and help them craft songs that continued to pursue the band's shift into electronic and synthesized sounds, yet with a more direct and aggressive feel in comparison to Smother. The album received acclaim from critics.

== Track listing ==
All songs written by Wild Beasts.

No.	Title	Length
1.	"Wanderlust"	4:55
2.	"Nature Boy"	3:33
3.	"Mecca"	3:45
4.	"Sweet Spot"	4:00
5.	"Daughters"	4:46
6.	"Pregnant Pause"	3:10
7.	"A Simple Beautiful Truth"	2:36
8.	"A Dog's Life"	3:20
9.	"Past Perfect"	2:57
10.	"New Life"	4:37
11.	"Palace"	3:20

== Chart positions ==
Chart (2014)	Peak position
Belgian Albums (Ultratop Flanders)	77
Belgian Albums (Ultratop Wallonia)	146
French Albums (SNEP)	172
Irish Albums (IRMA)	13
Irish Independent Albums (IRMA)	2
Scottish Albums (Official Charts)	15
UK Albums (Official Charts)	10
UK Independent Albums (Official Charts)	3
US Current Albums (Billboard)	177
US Heatseekers Albums (Billboard)	5
US Independent Albums (Billboard)	44
