= Compassion (disambiguation) =

Compassion is a profound and positive human emotion prompted by the pain of others. The following are related:

- Compassion fatigue
- Radical compassion
- Self-compassion

Compassion may also refer to:

== Organizations ==
- Compassion International, a Christian child sponsorship organization
- Compassion & Choices, American right-to-die organization
- Compassion in World Farming, British animal welfare organization

== Music ==
- Compassion (Hank Jones album), 1978
- Compassion (Cecil McBee album), 1979
- Compassion (Wadada Leo Smith album), 2006
- "Compassion", a song by Timothy B. Schmit from the 2009 album Expando
- Compassion (Nigel Westlake, Lior and Sydney Symphony Orchestra album), 2013
- Compassion (Forest Swords album), 2017
- Compassion (Royal Coda album), 2019
- Compassion (The Hoosiers album), 2026

== Entertainment ==
- Compassion (Doctor Who), a fictional character in the Eighth Doctor Adventures novels
- Love! Valour! Compassion!, Broadway play
  - Love! Valour! Compassion! (film), American film based on the play
- Compassion, short-story written by Dorothy Allison

== Other ==
- 8990 Compassion, an asteroid
- Charter for Compassion
- Nīlakaṇṭha Dhāraṇī, "Great Compassion"
