= Queen Katherine School =

The Queen Katherine School
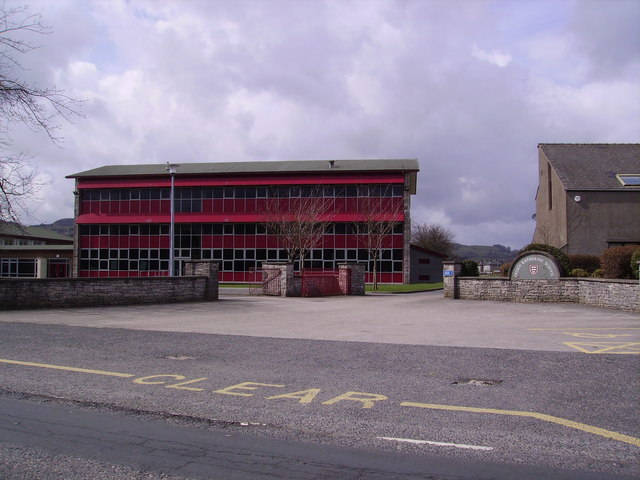

Location
- Appleby Road; Kendal, Cumbria, LA9 6PJ; England
- Coordinates: 54°20′22″N 2°44′07″W

Information
- Type: Academy
- Motto: Veritas
- Local authority: Westmorland and Furness
- Department for Education URN: 136526 Tables
- Ofsted: Reports
- Headteacher: Jon Hayes
- Gender: Co-educational
- Age: 11 to 18
- Enrolment: 1420
- Houses: 4
- Colours: Maroon and silver
- Website: http://www.queenkatherine.org/

The Queen Katherine School is an academy school located in Kendal, Cumbria, England. It is a co-educational facility for 11- to 18-year-olds and has 955 students.

The school was judged to be Good in all areas after an inspection by Ofsted in March 2022.

== Classification ==
The school achieved specialist status as a Technology College in 2001 and became a strategic facility for students with physical and medical difficulties in 2002. In 2006, it became a full-service Extended School.

In 2011 the school became an Academy.

In March 2022 the school was judged to be Good in all areas by Ofsted.

== Extracurricular activities ==
There are over 30 school clubs, and a number of activities during lunchtime, after school and at weekends.

There are regular school plays, including an annual musical, a number of choirs and a school orchestra, which perform locally. Many QKS students also play in the Westmorland Youth Orchestra and Cumbria Youth Orchestra, or sing in the Amabile choir.

== The School Council ==
Each form elects representatives who meet as a Year Council. There are Upper and Lower School Councils and a full School Council. Senior Students are elected from the Sixth Form, and they chair the various meetings and organise the Sixth Form Ball, amongst other things. The School Council is given an annual budget to spend on school improvement. The Council is also involved in charity fund-raising.

== Notable former pupils ==
- The members of Wild Beasts were pupils at the school in the early 2000s. Drummer Chris Talbot is the son of the school's music teachers, Robert and Lesley Talbot.
- Rear Admiral William Warrender, former Royal Navy officer who served as Flag Officer Sea Training.
