= Punk Drunk & Trembling =

EP by Wild Beasts
- Released: 20 October 2017
- Length: 10:08
- Label: Domino

Wild Beasts chronology
Boy King (2016)	Punk Drunk & Trembling (2017)	Last Night All My Dreams Came True (2018)

Professional ratings
Aggregate scores
Source	Rating
Metacritic	78/100
Review scores
Source	Rating
Drowned in Sound	8/10
The Line of Best Fit	9/10
Pitchfork	7/10

Punk Drunk & Trembling is the fifth EP by British indie rock band Wild Beasts. It was released on 20 October 2017 through Domino Recording Company. It is composed of out-takes from the sessions to their last album Boy King.

The release was the bands' final release of new material before they split, with three farewell shows that followed in February 2018.

== Track listing ==
No.	Title	Length
1.	"Punk Drunk & Trembling"	3:48
2.	"Last Night All My Dreams Came True"	3:22
3.	"Maze"	2:58
