= Civic Jams =

Studio album by Darkstar
- Released: 19 June 2020
- Length: 37:30
- Label: Warp

Darkstar chronology
Foam Island (2015)	Civic Jams (2020)

Singles from Civic Jams
- 1. "Wolf" Released: 20 February 2020; 2. "Jam" Released: 1 May 2020; 3. "Text" Released: 17 June 2020

Professional ratings
Aggregate scores
Source	Rating
Metacritic	71/100
Review scores
Source	Rating
AllMusic	3/5 stars
Clash	8/10
The Line of Best Fit	7/10
Loud and Quiet	6/10
MusicOMH	2.5/5 stars
Q	4/5 stars

Civic Jams is the fourth studio album by English electronic music duo Darkstar. It was released on 19 June 2020 under Warp.

== Singles ==
On 20 February 2020, the band announced their first single in four years, "Wolf". Their second single "Jam" was released on 1 May 2020, along with the announcement of the new album. On 17 June 2020, the third single "Text" was released.

== Critical reception ==
Civic Jams was met with "generally favourable" reviews from critics. At Metacritic, which assigns a weighted average rating out of 100 to reviews from mainstream publications, this release received an average score of 71, based on 5 reviews. Aggregator Album of the Year gave the album 67 out of 100 based on a critical consensus of 6 reviews.

== Track listing ==
Civic Jams track listing
No.	Title	Length
1.	"Forest"	3:25
2.	"Jam"	3:30
3.	"1001"	4:50
4.	"30" (featuring Laura Groves)	3:08
5.	"Wolf"	5:30
6.	"Loon"	4:11
7.	"Tuesday"	4:45
8.	"Text"	5:25
9.	"Blurred"	2:46
