= Smother (album) =

Studio album by Wild Beasts
- Released: 9 May 2011
- Recorded: 2010 in Snowdonia, North Wales
- Genre: Indie rock, dream pop
- Length: 42:02
- Label: Domino
- Producer: Richard Formby, Wild Beasts

Wild Beasts chronology
| Two Dancers (2009) | Smother (2011) | Present Tense (2014) |

Smother is the third studio album by British indie rock/dream pop band Wild Beasts released on 9 May 2011 by Domino Records. It reached #17 in the UK Albums Chart. According to the band, it represents a more synthesiser-based sound than previous efforts, influenced by "moving to Dalston", Brazilian writer Clarice Lispector, minimalist composer Steve Reich, noise pop duo Fuck Buttons, and Mary Shelley's book, Frankenstein.

== Background ==
The band moved to London to make the record and that, according to Hayden Thorpe, drew them "back to the Lake District, the soundscape of that place." "Smother refers to the pillow we were resting our heads - the album really was the place where our heads, thoughts and dreams were at the time... The duality of the word 'smother' is important to us as well - that mad human dynamic of doing the right things for all the wrong reasons or doing the wrong things for all the right reasons", the singer said.

== Critical reception ==
Professional ratings
Aggregate scores
| Source | Rating |
|---|---|
| AnyDecentMusic? | 8.2/10 |
| Metacritic | 85/100 |
Review scores
| Source | Rating |
| AllMusic | 4.5/5 stars |
| The A.V. Club | B+ |
| The Guardian | 4/5 stars |
| The Independent | 4/5 stars |
| Mojo | 4/5 stars |
| NME | 9/10 |
| Pitchfork | 8.2/10 |
| Q | 4/5 stars |
| Spin | 7/10 |
| Uncut | 4/5 stars |

Smother received widespread acclaim from contemporary music critics. At Metacritic, which assigns a normalized rating out of 100 to reviews from mainstream critics, the album received an average score of 85, based on 28 reviews, which indicates "universal acclaim".

Reviewing the album for BBC Music, Mike Diver wrote, "[Wild Beasts] are, right now, the most inspirational, intriguing, effortlessly enrapturing band at work [in Britain]. And Smother might well prove to be the album of 2011." Jon Pareles of The New York Times said, "In songs suffused with need and vulnerability, the music leaves itself open, waiting to be approached."

Uncut placed the album at number 8 on its list of "Top 50 albums of 2011". while Mojo placed the album at number 10.

As of January 2012 UK sales stand at 30,000 copies according to The Guardian.

== Track listing ==
| No. | Title | Length |
|---|---|---|
| 1. | "Lion's Share" | 4:14 |
| 2. | "Bed of Nails" | 4:18 |
| 3. | "Deeper" | 3:01 |
| 4. | "Loop the Loop" | 4:06 |
| 5. | "Plaything" | 4:21 |
| 6. | "Invisible" | 2:58 |
| 7. | "Albatross" | 3:12 |
| 8. | "Reach a Bit Further" | 3:36 |
| 9. | "Burning" | 4:44 |
| 10. | "End Come Too Soon" | 7:32 |
| Total length: | | 42:02 |

== Personnel ==
- Hayden Thorpe – lead vocals (1, 2, 4, 5, 7, 8, 10), backing vocals, guitar, bass guitar, keyboards, production
- Tom Fleming – lead vocals (1, 3, 6, 8, 9), backing vocals, keyboards, guitar, production
- Ben Little – lead guitar, keyboards, production
- Chris Talbot – drums, production
- Richard Formby – production, additional arrangements
- Lexxx – mixing
- Dave Pye – engineering
- Jason Evans – photography, art direction, design
- Matthew Cooper – design
