= Dagger Paths =

EP by Forest Swords
- Released: 1 March 2010
- Length: 34:05
- Label: Olde English Spelling Bee
- Producer: M. Barnes

Forest Swords chronology
Fjree Feather (2009)	Dagger Paths (2010)	Engravings (2013)

Dagger Paths is an EP by English record producer and visual artist Matthew Barnes under the pseudonym Forest Swords. It was released on 1 March 2010, through Olde English Spelling Bee. It received critical acclaim.

== Background ==
Dagger Paths was recorded on the Wirral Peninsula and Liverpool. It includes a cover version of "If Your Girl Only Knew", a song written by Timbaland and Missy Elliott and recorded by Aaliyah. Music videos were released for the songs "Miarches" and "Glory Gongs".

== Release ==
Dagger Paths was originally released on 1 March 2010, through Olde English Spelling Bee. It was reissued on 22 November 2010, through No Pain in Pop. The reissue edition includes two extra tracks from a 7-inch single: "Rattling Cage" and "Hjurt". Limited edition package of the reissue edition also comes with a bonus disc, containing early Forest Swords songs, remixes by other artists, and a lengthy Forest Swords mix.

The six early Forest Swords songs found on the reissue edition's bonus disc were later officially released in 2011 as the Fjree Feather EP, through No Pain in Pop. They had first appeared on a self-released EP of the same name, prior to Dagger Paths.

== Critical reception ==
Professional ratings
Aggregate scores
Source	Rating
AnyDecentMusic?	7.6/10
Review scores
Source	Rating
Drowned in Sound	9/10
Fact	5/5 stars
Loud and Quiet	3/10
Pitchfork	7.9/10
Pitchfork	8.4/10

Simon Hampson of Fact stated, "As Forest Swords plugs away relentlessly at his glacial riffs, with percussion bursting through like artillery fire, there's this really affecting sense of being witness to some very private act of catharsis." He added, "This is an overwhelmingly sad record, but at the same time a curiously hopeful one – the stunning cover of Aaliyah's 'If Your Girl', for example, is all dying-ember drones and ghostly hums until it suddenly flutters away into an almost ecstatic crescendo." In a review of the reissue edition, Marc Masters of Pitchfork commented that "All the elements and styles that Barnes collects like a magnet quickly align toward one unmistakable musical vision."

=== Accolades ===
Year-end lists for Dagger Paths
Publication	List	Rank	Ref.
DIY	Albums of the Year 2010	40	
Drowned in Sound	Albums of the Year 2010	44	
Fact	The 40 Best Albums of 2010	1	
Pitchfork	The Top 50 Albums of 2010	48	

== Track listing ==
All tracks are written by M. Barnes, except "If Your Girl" by T. Mosley and M. Elliott.

Dagger Paths track listing
No.	Title	Length
1.	"Miarches"	6:23
2.	"Hoylake Misst"	7:52
3.	"Visits"	3:31
4.	"Glory Gongs"	6:24
5.	"If Your Girl"	6:26
6.	"The Light"	3:29
Total length:		34:05

No Pain in Pop edition additional tracks
No.	Title	Length
7.	"Rattling Cage"	3:51
8.	"Hjurt"	4:10
Total length:		42:10

No Pain in Pop limited edition bonus disc
No.	Title	Length
1.	"Down Steps"	5:59
2.	"Red Rocks Fogg"	6:22
3.	"Kaibasa Claps"	6:07
4.	"Trust Your Blood"	6:15
5.	"Riverbed"	5:34
6.	"Bones"	5:27
7.	"Rattling Cage" (Becoming Real remix)	3:45
8.	"Miarches" (Turnbull Green's Skywalker OG remix)	4:19
9.	"Hjurt" (Pariah refix)	3:12
10.	"Rattling Cage" (Dro Carey 'Neon Hudrat' mix)	4:17
11.	"Remixtape"	23:27
Total length:		74:48

== Personnel ==
Credits adapted from liner notes.

- Matthew Barnes – production, art direction, design
- Carl Saff – mastering
- Mikko Gordon – mastering
