= Word of Mouth (The Blueskins album) =

Studio album by The Blueskins
- Released: 2004
- Genre: Rock
- Length: 40:31
- Label: Domino
- Producer: Richard Formby

The Blueskins chronology
Magic Road (2003)	Word of Mouth (2004)

Word of Mouth is the debut album from Wakefield blues-rock four-piece The Blueskins who have been described as "the sound of a teenage Led Zeppelin ripping through 'Rock 'n' Roll' in their parents' garage". It was produced by Richard Formby and featured the singles "Change My Mind" and "The Stupid Ones" as well as "Ellie Meadows" from their Magic Road ep.

== Track listing ==
1. "Bad Day" – 2:44
2. "Stupid Ones" – 3:31
3. "Change My Mind" – 2:30
4. "Girl" – 3:54
5. "Ellie Meadows" – 3:18
6. "Love Boat" – 3:10
7. "My Love Is Law" – 4:09
8. "Go" – 3:45
9. "Tell Me I'm Someone" – 4:42
10. "Take Me Home" – 3:47
11. "Magpie Blues" – 5:01

== Critical reception ==
Colin Somerville, writing in The Scotsman, made Word of Mouth his record of the week and said that it was "rollicking good debut album".
