= Foam Island =

Studio album by Darkstar
- Released: 25 September 2015
- Length: 39:47
- Label: Warp

Darkstar chronology
News from Nowhere (2013)	Foam Island (2015)	Civic Jams (2020)

Professional ratings
Aggregate scores
Source	Rating
Metacritic	71/100
Review scores
Source	Rating
AllMusic	3.5/5 stars
Crack Magazine	7/10
Exclaim!	6/10
The Line of Best Fit	5/10
MusicOMH	4/5 stars
The Skinny	4/5 stars
Under the Radar	7.5/10

Foam Island is the third studio album by British electronic music duo Darkstar. It was released on 25 September 2015 under Warp.

== Critical reception ==
Foam Island was met with "generally favorable" reviews from critics. At Metacritic, which assigns a weighted average rating out of 100 to reviews from mainstream publications, this release received an average score of 71, based on 8 reviews.

=== Accolades ===
Accolades for Foam Island
Publication	Accolade	Rank
Clash	Clash's 50 Best Albums of 2015	6
Dummy Mag	Dummy's 30 Best Albums of 2015	16

== Track listing ==
Foam Island track listing
No.	Title	Length
1.	"Basic Things"	2:02
2.	"Inherent In This Fibre"	3:58
3.	"Stoke the Fire"	4:04
4.	"Cuts"	1:32
5.	"Go Natural"	4:42
6.	"A Different Kind of Struggle"	1:51
7.	"Pin Secure"	4:55
8.	"Through the Motions"	4:31
9.	"Tilly's Theme"	2:33
10.	"Foam Island"	3:32
11.	"Javan's Call"	2:12
12.	"Days Burn Blue"	3:45

== Charts ==
Chart performance for Foam Island
Chart (2015)	Peak position
Belgian Albums (Ultratop Flanders)	198
