= Engravings (album) =

2013 album by Forest Swords

Studio album by Forest Swords
- Released: 26 August 2013
- Recorded: 2011–2013
- Genre: Experimental; electronic; dub
- Length: 50:43
- Label: Tri Angle
- Producer: Matthew Barnes

Forest Swords chronology
Dagger Paths (2010)	Engravings (2013)	Compassion (2017)

Engravings is the debut studio album by English music producer Matthew Barnes under the stage name Forest Swords. It was released on 26 August 2013 by Tri Angle.

== Background ==
Uniquely, Engravings was mixed on headphones outdoors on Thurstaston Hill in The Wirral, which Barnes credits as giving the album a natural and atmospheric sound. The recording of the album was only possible in short bursts as he was affected by hearing problems, which both delayed the completion of the album and contributed to the minimal nature of the arrangements.

Brighton, UK vocalist Anneka provides vocals on the track "Anneka's Battle".

== Release ==
On 18 July 2013, Barnes announced the release of Engravings and posted the track "The Weight of Gold" to his SoundCloud page. It was later named "Best New Track" by Pitchfork. Previously, "Thor's Stone" had been shared in June 2013 but without mention of the album release.

The video for "Thor's Stone" was directed by Dave Ma and was online in September 2013, featuring Spanish dancer Guzman Rosado.

A video for "The Weight of Gold" directed by French dancer and choreographer Benjamin Millepied was posted online in February 2014, featuring dancer Billy Barry.

A remix of "Thor's Stone" by dub artist Lee Scratch Perry was posted online in November 2013.

== Reception ==
Professional ratings
Aggregate scores
Source	Rating
AnyDecentMusic?	8.0/10
Metacritic	81/100
Review scores
Source	Rating
Clash	9/10
Consequence of Sound	4/5 stars
Exclaim!	8/10
Fact	4/5
Mixmag	4.5/5
NME	7/10
The Observer	4/5 stars
Pitchfork	8.5/10
Resident Advisor	4.5/5
Uncut	7/10

Engravings received strong critical reviews on release. Mixmag named Engravings their album of the month for August 2013 and praised it as "one of the most inventive albums of the year". Pitchfork designated the album as "Best New Music" and said, "Every song is boldly sensual, and each note has a distinct emotional hue. Mixing that intensity with dream-like atmospheres lands Engravings in a unique emotional space". Fact wrote, "If Dagger Paths was a revelation, Engravings is a refinement, long to arrive but worth the wait." Resident Advisor deemed it "even more breathtaking" than Dagger Paths.

Engravings was listed in year-end lists of the best albums of 2013 by several publications, including The Wire, Pitchfork, Stereogum, Clash, Filter, Dummy Mag, Bleep.com, Tiny Mix Tapes, Norman Records, Piccadilly Records, eMusic, and Rhapsody.

The album cover artwork, designed by Barnes, was nominated for the award "Best Art Vinyl 2013" and listed in Pitchfork's top 25 album covers of 2013.

== Track listing ==
All tracks are written by Matthew Barnes, except where noted.

No.	Title	Length
1.	"Ljoss"	5:19
2.	"Thor's Stone"	4:31
3.	"Irby Tremor"	4:11
4.	"Onward"	5:40
5.	"The Weight of Gold"	5:04
6.	"An Hour"	5:02
7.	"Anneka's Battle" (writer: Anneka Warburton)	4:09
8.	"Gathering"	4:59
9.	"The Plumes"	3:40
10.	"Friend, You Will Never Learn"	8:12
Total length:		50:43

== Charts ==
Chart performance for Engravings
Chart (2013)	Peak position
UK Independent Albums (OCC)	30
