= North (Darkstar album) =

Studio album by Darkstar
- Released: 18 October 2010
- Recorded: 2010
- Genre: Synth-pop, glitch, future garage, dubstep
- Length: 39:36
- Label: Hyperdub
- Producer: Darkstar

Darkstar chronology
North (2010)	News From Nowhere (2013)

Professional ratings
Review scores
Source	Rating
BBC	(Positive)
Drowned In Sound	(8/10)
Fact Magazine	5/5 stars
The Quietus	(Very Positive)
Pitchfork Media	(6.6/10)
Resident Advisor	4.5/5 stars
Slant Magazine	4/5 stars
The Telegraph	4/5 stars

North is the debut studio album by British electronic music duo Darkstar. The album was released on 18 October 2010.

== Background ==
The primary influence on North was Orchestral Manoeuvres in the Dark's (OMD) self-titled debut album from 1980. Other inspirations included Burial, Radiohead and the Human League.

== Track listing ==
1. "In the Wings" – 2:53
2. "Gold" – 4:20
3. "Deadness" – 4:39
4. "Aidys Girl Is a Computer" – 5:11
5. "Under One Roof" – 4:31
6. "Two Chords" – 3:58
7. "North" – 3:53
8. "Ostkreuz" – 2:30
9. "Dear Heartbeat" - 3:43
10. "When It's Gone" - 3:58
