= Bolted (album) =

Studio album by Forest Swords
- Released: 20 October 2023
- Recorded: 2022–2023
- Length: 41:24
- Label: Ninja Tune
- Producer: Matthew Barnes

Forest Swords chronology
Compassion (2017)	Bolted (2023)

Singles from Bolted
- 1. "Butterfly Effect" / "Tar" Released: 11 July 2023; 2. "The Low" / "Caged" Released: 5 September 2023; 3. "Munitions" Released: 3 October 2023; 4. "Night Sculpture" Released: 16 October 2023

Bolted is the third studio album by British electronic music artist Forest Swords. It was released on 20 October 2023 through Ninja Tune. The album is his first studio release in over six years, following Compassion (2017).

== Background and singles ==
Before he began working on the record, the musician spent a few years writing music for ballets, films and video games. Barnes recorded the album from 2022 to 2023 at a warehouse factory space in his hometown Liverpool. While putting the record together, he was coping with "psychedelic amounts of pain" from a leg injury. Barnes announced the project on 5 September 2023. He is set to embark on a tour through Europe promoting the album in November 2023.

His first single in five years titled "Butterfly Effect" was released on 11 July 2023. It features a previously unreleased vocal sample of Swedish-British singer Neneh Cherry. The song arrived with a b-side called "Tar". The second single, "The Low", was originally intended for American singer Yoko Ono and combines elements of both the start and the end of the album. It wraps up the main sentiments he had when writing for the record. An accompanying music video directed by Sam Wiehl elaborates on the visual direction of the record.

== Critical reception ==
Professional ratings
Aggregate scores
Source	Rating
Metacritic	84/100
Review scores
Source	Rating
AllMusic	4/5 stars
Beats Per Minute	82%
Clash	8/10
The Line of Best Fit	9/10
Pitchfork	7.5/10

Bolted was met with "universal acclaim" reviews from critics. At Metacritic, which assigns a weighted average rating out of 100 to reviews from mainstream publications, this release received an average score of 84, based on 7 reviews.

At The Line of Best Fit, writer Jack Bray gave the release a nine out of 10, calling the release "a defiant, desolate, and darkly beautiful album that commands multiple listens and highlights once more that Forest Swords is and always has been at the top of his game." Josh Laclair of Beats Per Minute called it "the very best albums of this year", giving the release an 82%. The Quietus called the album "absolutely phenomenal".

The album was ranked at number 62 by PopMatters on their 80 best albums of 2023.

== Track listing ==
All lyrics are written by Matthew Barnes, except "Butterfly Effect", written by Neneh Cherry; all music is composed by Matthew Barnes.

Bolted track listing
No.	Title	Length
1.	"Munitions"	3:44
2.	"Butterfly Effect"	3:31
3.	"Rubble"	3:56
4.	"Night Sculpture"	3:26
5.	"Caged"	4:32
6.	"Tar"	1:32
7.	"The Low"	3:38
8.	"Chain Link"	3:43
9.	"Hjope"	3:10
10.	"End"	4:13
11.	"Line Gone Cold"	5:59
Total length:		41:24

== Personnel ==
- Matthew Barnes – production, mixing, art direction
- Matt Colton – mastering

== Charts ==
Chart performance for Bolted
Chart (2023)	Peak position
UK Album Downloads (OCC)	47
UK Dance Albums (OCC)	4
UK Independent Albums (OCC)	40
