= News from Nowhere (Darkstar album) =

Studio album by Darkstar
- Released: 5 February 2013
- Recorded: 2012
- Genre: Ambient, art pop, psychedelic pop, synthpop
- Length: 40:37
- Label: Warp
- Producer: Darkstar and Richard Formby

Darkstar chronology
North (2010)	News from Nowhere (2013)	Foam Island (2015)

Professional ratings
Review scores
Source	Rating
The Guardian	4/5 stars
Mixmag	4/5 stars
NME	8/10
Pitchfork	7/10
Resident Advisor	4/5 stars

News from Nowhere is the second studio album by British electronic music duo Darkstar. It was released in February 2013 by Warp Records. The album was produced and recorded at Richard Formby's studio in Leeds, using Formby's vintage analog synthesizers and classic tape machines.

Darkstar members Aiden Whalley, James Young and new member James Buttery returned from touring to promote their debut album North, and began writing and recording the album in rural Yorkshire. The album is named after William Morris' classic book, whose subject matter combined utopian socialism and science fiction.

This album differs from their earlier album North by the addition of vocal work from Buttery.

== Reception ==
News from Nowhere received positive reviews from MOJO and The Quietus, and generally positive reviews from several other reviewers.

== Track listing ==
No.	Title	Length
1.	"Light Body Clock Starter"	2:57
2.	"Timeaway"	3:22
3.	"Armonica"	3:42
4.	"-"	2:45
5.	"A Day's Pay For A Day's Work"	3:50
6.	"Young Heart's"	2:57
7.	"Amplified Ease"	4:48
8.	"You Don't Need A Weatherman"	5:17
9.	"Bed Music - North View"	3:41
10.	"Hold Me Down"	7:18
