= Darkstar (band) =

British electronic music group

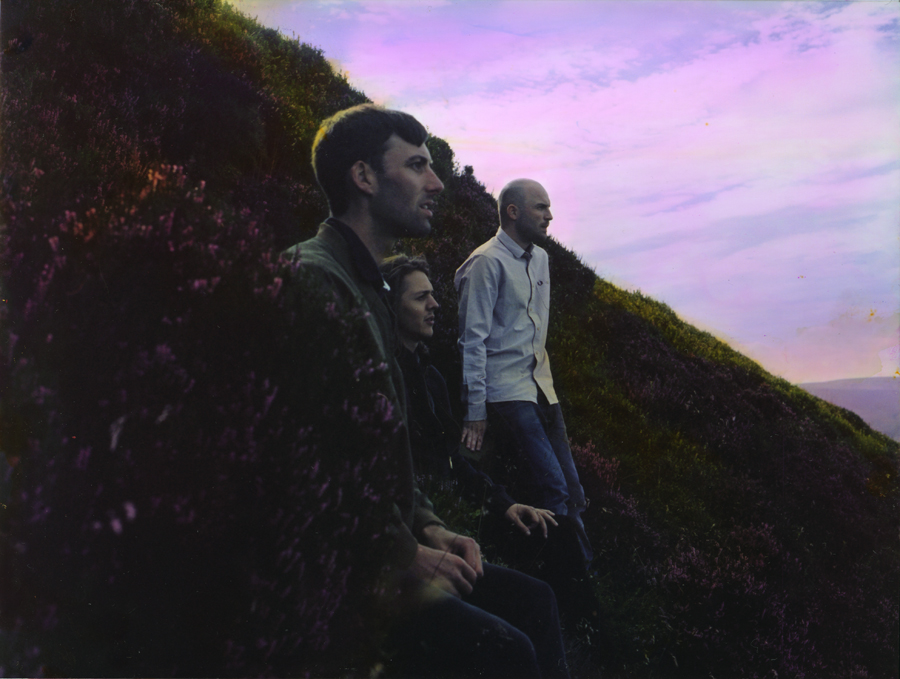
- Darkstar in 2012

Background information
- Origin: England
- Genres: Electronic, synthpop
- Years active: 2006–present
- Labels: Warp; Hyperdub; 2010 Records
- Members: James Young; Aiden Whalley
- Past members: James Buttery

Darkstar are a British electronic music duo. Since 2007, they have released music on Hyperdub, Warp and 2010 Records.

== History ==
=== Early singles ===
James Young & Aiden Whalley began making music together in London in 2007, releasing their first compositions "Dead 2 Me" & "Break" under the name Darkstar on their own label - 2010 Records.

This release was followed later the same year by "Lilyliver/Out of Touch" and "Memories (Remix)/Sayter" a split single with London producer Zomby, issued on the MG77 label.

London musician and Hyperdub label head Kode9 released "Need You/Squeeze My Lime" in 2008. The "Round Ours" EP was also released in 2008 on Clandestine Cultivations.

=== Aidy's Girl Is a Computer EP ===
Over the course of these releases Darkstar steadily developed a unique sound that drew sonically from grime, dubstep, electro and synth-pop - culminating in 2009 with the release of the single "Aidy's Girl Is A Computer" via Hyperdub. It was named by The Guardian as "one of the singles of the year" and in the top 100 tracks of 2009 by Pitchfork Media. It was featured on the 5: Five Years of Hyperdub compilation and in Jamie xx's mix for Paris clothing and accessory retailer Colette.

=== North album ===
After discarding an album's worth of recordings and enlisting James Buttery as a vocalist, Darkstar recorded a full-length album that largely eschewed dance music in favor of a unique blend of melancholy electronic pop and ambient experimentation. The album, North, was released by Hyperdub on 18 October 2010. Despite being a marked departure from their earlier 12" releases it was met with wide acclaim. FACT called it "an incredibly fragile, engaging and emotionally driven record. North is an impressive debut and one of the most unique albums you’re likely to hear in 2010" and the BBC declared it "a downbeat record that reclaims dubstep's original dark energy and experimental imperative".

=== News from Nowhere album ===
After considerable international touring on the back of North, Whalley, Young and Buttery decamped to a house in rural Yorkshire to begin writing and recording their next album, to be released on Warp. Buttery was now involved in the writing and recording process as an official member of Darkstar. Whalley said in an interview with online magazine Dummy in August 2012 "This album’s more different though because we’ve kind of exhausted that idea, and those melodies that were on ‘North’ and the ones before, as soon as we came up with ideas that reminded us of that we had to move away from it and come up with something that was a new challenge. Get away from the old melodies and the melancholy sentiment."

Darkstar recorded News From Nowhere with producer Richard Formby in Leeds, giving them access to Formby's vintage analogue synthesizers and classic tape machines. The album is named after William Morris' classic book whose subject matter combined utopian socialism and science fiction.

Released in February 2013, News From Nowhere was called "elegant and progressive" by MOJO and The Quietus described it "like being pushed off a skyscraper and discovering wings…altogether beyond words". The sound of their new material garnered Darkstar favorable comparisons to Radiohead, James Blake, Massive Attack, Animal Collective and Brian Eno.

Influential London record shop Rough Trade named News From Nowhere its "Album of The Month" for February 2013.

=== "01484" & "HD7" EPs ===
"01484" and "HD7" are two remix EPs, reworking tracks from the band's February 2013 album "News from Nowhere". The titles of the EPs are named after the Huddersfield and surrounding areas dialling code and post code, and the band chose to name them so as the remixes are an extension of the album which was recorded in Slaithwaite, West Yorkshire. "01484" calls on German house and techno producer Motor City Drum Ensemble to rework "A Day's Pay For A Day's Work" alongside the band remixing their own tracks, "Young Hearts" and "Armonica". The second EP "HD7" features a remix from Kollaps, a producer on Zomby's Cult Music label, alongside further remixes from the band.

"01484" was released in October 2013 via Warp and "HD7" via the same imprint later in 2013.

=== Kirklees Arcadia mixtape ===
On 9 April Darkstar released their mixtape ‘Kirklees Arcadia’. For the Mixtape, Aidan and James collaborate with Gwilym Gold, Zomby and Wild Beasts singer Hayden Thorpe who fills in vocals on a cover of Paul McCartney’s "Temporary Secretary." The mixtape also features a re-edit of the group’s "Aidy’s Girl Is A Computer" and a remix of LFO’s "We Are Back."

=== Foam Island album ===
Third studio album "Foam Island" was released on 25 September (UK) and 2 October (ROW) via Warp Records. The duo shared lead track 'Pin Secure' on album announce. The album's themes were inspired by social change in the UK and in particular how this is affecting the youth of today post UK Conservative Party re-election. The duo travelled to Huddersfield in order to talk to and capture the thoughts and aspirations of the Northern youth of England. In 2017, they completed a similar project in South Africa, interviewing Cape Town residents about their homes, communities and dreams for a short film, Inherent in the Fibre.

19 January 2016 saw the band announce Germany tour dates in support of "Foam Island", scheduled for mid-February, till early March, including a date at the nightclub Berghain in Berlin.

=== Made to Measure EP ===
In June 2016, Darkstar announced they would be a releasing an EP "Made To Measure", their first release since "Foam Island". "Made To Measure's" lead track, "Reformer," features Terrible Records artist Empress Of. Another EP track, "Black Ghost," has them working with Mixpak affiliate Gaika and was released on 15 July via Warp Records. A Video for the lead track "Reformer" was released on 15 June. The duo also played a live session at the BBC's Maida Vale, "A couple weeks ago we went to Maida Vale to perform a few tracks from the new EP for BBC Radio 1. We asked GAIKA down to perform our new collaboration with him ‘Black Ghost'"

=== Collaborations ===
In 2016, Darkstar collaborated with Gaika, Empress Of, and on the song "Quandary" for Zomby's album Ultra, released in September via Hyperdub.

== Style ==
Robin Murray of Clash wrote in 2010, "Signed to Hyperdub, Darkstar stick out on the label's eclectic roster. A synth-pop group, there is little dub in their sound, which owes more to an intense re-visiting of ground broken by The Human League, OMD and more."

== Discography ==
=== Albums ===
- 2010 North (Hyperdub)
- 2013 News from Nowhere (Warp)
- 2015 Foam Island (Warp)
- 2015 Kirklees Arcadia (Warp)
- 2020 Civic Jams (Warp)

=== Singles and EPs ===
- 2007 "Dead 2 Me" / "Break" (2010 Records)
- 2007 "Lilyliver" / "Out of Touch" (2010 Records)
- 2007 "Memories" (Remix) / "Saytar" (MG77)
- 2008 "Need You" / "Squeeze My Lime" (12-inch single) (Hyperdub)
- 2008 "Round Ours" (Clandestine Cultivations)
- 2008 "Starkey" (Remixes) (Offshore Recordings)
- 2009 "Aidy's Girl Is a Computer" (Hyperdub)
- 2010 "Gold" (Hyperdub)
- 2012 "Timeaway" (Warp)
- 2016 "Made to Measure" (Warp)

=== Remix EPs ===
- 2013 "01484" (Warp)
- 2013 "HD7" (Warp)
