= Interior Night =

Video game developer

Interior Night Limited
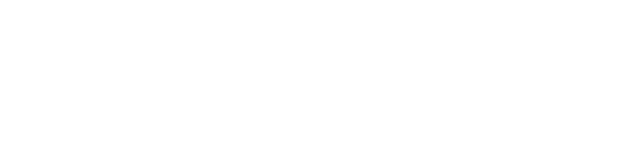
- Type: Private company limited by shares
- Industry: Video games
- Founded: 8 November 2017; 8 years ago
- Founder: Caroline Marchal
- Headquarters: London, England
- Number of employees: ▲40 (2020)
- Website: interiornight.com

Interior Night is an independent video game developer based in London. The company focuses on interactive storytelling. It was founded by creative director Caroline Marchal, formerly of Quantic Dream, in November 2017. Their debut game, As Dusk Falls, was released on 19 July 2022 for Windows, Xbox One and Xbox Series X/S and 7 March 2024 for PlayStation 4 and PlayStation 5.

== History ==
The company was opened by creative director Caroline Marchal on 8 November 2017, who previously worked as a lead game designer on Quantic Dream's Heavy Rain and Beyond: Two Souls, to produce "rich narrative games and experiences" for "people who love shows like Breaking Bad or Fargo but who do not necessarily game". Marchal told PCGamesN that the studio is "aiming at the TV audience – people who watch Netflix or HBO. We're hoping to bring that quality to gaming, with complex characters and accessible yet deep gameplay."

A month later, the company hired three senior staff members: Ronald De Feijter as technical director, Steve Kniebihly as cinematic director, and Charu Desodt as production director. They signed a publishing deal on 29 January 2018 with Sega for an untitled interactive game; the deal was canceled in July 2019, yet the development of the game proceeded. The company had 20 employees by July 2018. Their debut game As Dusk Falls was announced at the Xbox Games Showcase on 23 July 2020. The game is a multi-generational story about "two families whose trajectories collide in the Arizona desert in 1998." It was released on 19 July 2022 on Xbox Series X/S, Xbox One and Microsoft Windows. The number of employees was reported as 40 in July 2020.

== Games developed ==
Year	Title	Platform(s)
2022	As Dusk Falls	Microsoft Windows, Xbox One, Xbox Series X/S, PlayStation 4, PlayStation 5
