= As Dusk Falls =

2022 video game

- Developer: Interior Night
- Publishers: Xbox Game Studios; Interior Night (PS4, PS5, GOG.com)
- Director: Caroline Marchal
- Engine: Unity
- Platforms: Windows; Xbox One; Xbox Series X/S; PlayStation 4; PlayStation 5
- Release: Windows, XB1, XBX/S; 19 July 2022; PS4, PS5; 7 March 2024
- Genres: Adventure, interactive fiction
- Modes: Single-player, multiplayer

As Dusk Falls is a 2022 adventure game developed by Interior Night and published by Xbox Game Studios. The game was released for Windows, Xbox One and Xbox Series X/S on 19 July 2022. It was released for PlayStation 4 and PlayStation 5 on 7 March 2024. It received generally positive reviews from critics.

== Gameplay ==
The gameplay of As Dusk Falls revolves around interactive storytelling, as well as novel techniques used to gauge consensus among players for pivotal narrative decisions when playing co-operatively in its multiplayer modes. Its narrative is a multi-generational story about "two families whose trajectories collide in the Arizona desert in 1998."

== Synopsis ==
=== Book One: Collision ===
In 1998, the Walker family—Vince, his wife Michelle, six-year-old daughter Zoe, and father Jim—are relocating to St. Louis, Missouri. On their way through Two Rock, Arizona they are involved in a car accident with the Holt brothers, Tyler, Dale, and Jay, and their car is left immobile. Unable to proceed, the family rent a room at a nearby motel, the Desert Dream. The Holt brothers arrive at the house of Sheriff Dante Romero, intending to steal the hundreds of thousands of dollars in his safe. The youngest brother, Jay, also takes a book on birds because he likes them. The Sheriff arrives home unexpectedly and the brothers flee, but Romero sees their truck and assigns his entire force to locating it. The brothers arrive to and take shelter in the Desert Dream, taking the Walkers, owner Joyce, and handyman Paul hostage, intending to hide until dusk. Based on choices made, the police are alerted in different ways and surround the Desert Dream.

Various flashbacks reveal that the Walker marriage is struggling in Sacramento, California. Vince was fired from his job as an aircraft engineer after a technical fault that led to two people being injured and one killed. Despite having warned the owners of the fault, Vince is under pressure to take the blame in exchange for money. Michelle has also begun an affair, and Jim, long-absent from Vince's life, is suffering from a brain tumor. The Holts are revealed as a dysfunctional family kept in poverty by their gambling addict father Bear. The brothers robbed the Sheriff to pay off his debts and remove the threat to their lives from his debtors. Jay either prevents Bear killing himself for the insurance money or lets him die.

The Holts' mother Sharon talks her way into the building by convincing the police she will convince the brothers to surrender. Instead she plots with them to escape. Romero makes contact with Vince and encourages him to locate a black book unwittingly stolen by the brothers. Working with Jay, they eventually realize it was inside the bird book he took. The black book details Romero's corrupt dealings including bribes and criminal money, all held in a single offshore account. Romero is adamant that the money belongs to dangerous people and he needs the book back, launching two futile assaults that get several officers shot and killed. Finally ramming a school bus through the front door of the motel, the bus is set on fire and explodes and the surviving Holts flee with a hostage, Vince or Zoe. Dale is shot and killed, and depending on decisions made, Michelle, Joyce, and Vince can also die.

=== Book Two: Expansion ===
The Holts are involved in a car crash, forcing Sharon and Tyler to flee, leaving Jay behind. Jay eventually recovers but is concussed and taken in by a young girl called Vanessa. The pair can bond before Jay leaves, eventually reuniting with Sharon and Tyler in a woodland cabin. He learns that Tyler intends to flee to Mexico with Sharon because Jay is not actually her son, he was born to her sister who died in childbirth. Jay decides to flee North to Canada alone.

Jay escapes to Salt Lake City, Utah, and calls Vanessa for help. Struggling with her overbearing father and still mourning the loss of her brother, Vanessa runs away with Jay to help him escape. They stop at a house party in Idaho Falls, Idaho to ask Vanessa's old friend for help. Depending on decisions made, Vanessa can abandon Jay or agree to run away to Canada with him as a friend or lover. Jay can escape the pursuing FBI through Glacier National Park in Montana with or without Vanessa and leap into the water marking the border, being assumed dead, or he can be imprisoned. Sharon meets with Paul, Romero's cousin and an old friend. Depending on choices made, Paul can agree to run away with Sharon by emptying Romero's offshore account or get her arrested.

In 2012, Zoe is revealed to still be suffering from nightmares and anxiety caused by her experience in the Desert Dream, especially as she has started receiving letters from Jay asking for her to write back. She speaks with Jim, who revealed to Vince previously that he lied about his tumor in an attempt to be closer to his estranged family. Jim now struggles with Alzheimer's, and encourages her to confront her own fears. Zoe tracks Jay down, revealing that he is either in prison or a fugitive in the Canadian wilderness; if he escaped with Vanessa in 1998, Jay explains that although he and Vanessa spent many years together, she eventually grew tired of living in hiding and moved to California. The ending is determined based on various choices made: Zoe can forgive Jay but ask that he no longer contact her, or she can turn him into the police; Jay can live free but on the run, be imprisoned, or executed; Tyler can be caught, or remain a fugitive working on an oil rig; Sharon can be caught or escapes to a tropical beach with Paul; Vince can take the blame for the aircraft incident and work an office job or sue the airline and open his own flying school; Michelle can die, be separated or still married to Vince, or engaged to someone else; and if Bear survives, he places flowers on Dale's grave. After Zoe returns from seeing Jay, she visits Jim and comes across him being assaulted by a stalker who runs past her as she looks on an unknown scene, while a phone message to Zoe from Jim reveals he has a secret past in Two Rock that he has never told anyone about.

== Development and release ==
As Dusk Falls was announced on 23 July 2020 at the Xbox Games Showcase event.

Development was led by creative director Caroline Marchal, who was previously employed by Quantic Dream as a designer for the company's titles Heavy Rain and Beyond: Two Souls.

The game was released for Windows, Xbox One, and Xbox Series X/S on 19 July 2022. It also launched on Xbox Game Pass for cloud, console, and PC via Steam. It was released for PlayStation 4, PlayStation 5 and GOG.com on 7 March 2024.

== Reception ==
Reception

Aggregate scores
Aggregator	Score
Metacritic	PC: 77/100; XSXS: 77/100
OpenCritic	71% recommend

Review scores
Publication	Score
Electronic Gaming Monthly	4/5
Game Informer	8.75/10
GameSpot	9/10
GamesRadar+	4/5
HobbyConsolas	80/100
IGN	9/10
Jeuxvideo.com	15/20
PC Gamer (US)	80/100
RPGFan	86/100
Shacknews	8/10
The Guardian	4/5
Video Games Chronicle	2/5

As Dusk Falls received "generally favorable" reviews from critics, according to review aggregator website Metacritic. Fellow review aggregator OpenCritic assessed that the game received strong approval, being recommended by 71% of critics. Many critics lauded its storytelling, art style, voicework, co-op mode, and the emotional impact of narrative choices offered to players, whereas criticism was directed mainly towards its climax and clunky controls.

Michael Goroff of Electronic Gaming Monthly wrote favorably of the game's competently directed scenes, evocative painting-based art style, ability to view alternate paths, implementation of co-op mode, and immersive storytelling, but disliked the undercut tension of the narrative's second half and the cliffhanger ending. Robert Purchese of Eurogamer called it "the best interactive movie game I've played", citing the multiplayer component, photoreal comic strip art style, effective key frames, impressive voicework, character development, flashback-based storytelling, mature depiction of heavy subject matter, and TV-inspired presentation as its strengths, concluding, "[As Dusk Falls] shows how well games can handle stories and themes like these when done with care and understanding, and how well it can pull us into the lives of others and invest us in the decisions they have to make."

Game Informer's Matt Miller gave it 8.75 out of 10 and praised its wide appeal, stating, "For players interested in the progress of interactive narrative frameworks, it's a laudable success. But even for someone who never plays games, it works. That's because good characters and storytelling make for a universal experience, and this is a project that has both." Writing for GameSpot, Mark Delaney gave high praise to the motion comic artwork, audio drama presentation, quality voice acting, thoughtful thematic material, impactful choices, and the developer's keen understanding of pacing and characterization, but took issue with out-of-place action scenes and an ending hampered by sequel baiting.

Dustin Bailey of GamesRadar+ similarly liked the TV-style pacing, nuanced characters, and the multiplayer's elevation of familiar genre mechanics, but noted how choice mechanics felt thin when replaying the game. Gabriel Moss of IGN found the title to be highly replayable and enjoyable due to its impactful choices and branching narrative, writing, "Since no time is wasted making you search for puzzle clues or awkwardly stumble around in a 3D environment, As Dusk Falls leaves space for a noticeably wider number of meaningful decisions than in any Telltale game, and they don't just feel like they're giving the mere illusion of choice."

Shacknews' Donovan Erskine called the Xbox version "an impressive debut from Interior Night" and praised the emotional weight given to the solid writing by the vocal performances, but expressed minor complaints with its subpar music and clunky cursor controls. Writing for The Guardian, Keza MacDonald gave the title 4 stars out of 5, concluding, "As Dusk Falls comfortably exceeds the standard of its genre when it comes to plotting, characterization, performance and the impressive malleability of the story."

Dean Takahashi of VentureBeat felt the game straddled the line between a soap opera and drama and lamented the lack of logical narrative choices, claiming that these elements hindered the empathy both sides of the story were able to create. Jordan Middler of Video Games Chronicle awarded the title 2 stars out of 5, stating, "For every well-developed moment of story interaction, for every revelation that took us by surprise, and for every interesting piece of art, it's undercut by dialogue that vacillates between contemporary drama and first-year uni project, and an art style that benefits the quiet moments, but utterly wrenches any momentum of action from the piece."

=== Accolades ===
Year	Award	Category	Result	Ref
2022	Golden Joystick Awards	Xbox Game of the Year	Nominated	
2022	The Game Awards	Games for Impact	Won	
2022	The Game Awards	Innovation in Accessibility	Nominated	
2023	New York Game Awards	Herman Melville Award for Best Writing in a Game	Nominated	
2023	New York Game Awards	Great White Way Award for Best Acting in a Game (Alex Jarrett)	Nominated	
2023	British Academy Games Awards	Debut Game	Nominated	
