= Compassion (Forest Swords album) =

Studio album by Forest Swords
- Released: 5 May 2017
- Genres: Experimental; electronica
- Length: 47:07
- Labels: Ninja Tune; Dense Truth
- Producer: Matthew Barnes

Forest Swords chronology
Engravings (2013)	Compassion (2017)	Bolted (2023)

Compassion is the second studio album by British electronic music artist Forest Swords, released on 5 May 2017. The album is Forest Swords' second, following 2013's Engravings.

The first single from the album, "The Highest Flood", was released on 7 March 2017. Compassion was announced on 30 March 2017, and accompanied by another track from the album, "Arms Out", featuring a video directed by Sam Wiehl and Forest Swords himself. On 26 April 2017, a third track, "Panic", was released, again with a video directed by the artist.

A further single featuring two tracks from the Compassion album recording sessions—"Congregate" and "Free"—was released on 28 September, with all proceeds going to relief work in Mexico and Puerto Rico.

In an interview with Fact, Barnes talked about the hybrid of digital and analog sounds used to create the record, noting that computer-generated instruments and digital processing on recordings blur the lines between "real and fake" on the record, drawing parallels between his music making techniques and the current affairs trend of 'fake news' in the media. Barnes cited "communication" as a central theme of the record, claiming "It's what I like exploring musically as well, sometimes you can say quite a lot with an instrumental part that you maybe can't say with language or lyrics that are prescriptive."

== Artwork and design ==
Barnes has a background in graphic design, and designed all the artwork for the album himself. In an interview with The Vinyl Factory, he said he chose the album’s cover photograph because ‘It just seemed to sum up what I try and make with the music: something that’s timeless… and something that veers between different emotions’, describing it as a ‘visual metaphor’ for the ‘feel and themes of the record’. The image of a man balancing a giant pumice rock on his legs, is a Lucius G Folsom photograph, September 1921. Barnes describes a book on Francis Bacon’s paintings and ’the photos they found on his studio floor by John Deakin’ as a ‘singular… style reference for the artwork’ on Compassion.

The art booklet that accompanies the deluxe edition of the album includes a variety of found images sourced from "old books and magazines". Many of the images are "portraits of people who'd emigrated" through Barnes's "home port" of Liverpool in the early 1900s.

== Critical reception ==
Professional ratings
Aggregate scores
Source	Rating
Metacritic	82/100
Review scores
Source	Rating
AllMusic	4/5 stars
The A.V. Club	A−
Clash	8/10
Exclaim!	8/10
Pitchfork	7.8/10
PopMatters	4/5 stars
Q	4/5 stars
Record Collector	4/5 stars
Resident Advisor	4.5/5
Rolling Stone	4/5 stars

At Metacritic, which assigns a normalized rating out of 100 to reviews from mainstream publications, Compassion received an average score of 82, based on 15 reviews, indicating "universal acclaim". Q magazine gave the album a score of 4 out of 5 and said it "unfolds like a journey through a bustling soundscape of found sounds, instrumental loops and post-dubstep production". Loud and Quiet gave the album 8 out of 10 and stated it is "arresting in its austerity". Pitchfork rated the album 7.8; "more ambitious and varied while retaining the uncanniness he's known for". PopMatters gave it a score of 8, saying "A dazzling, evocative album that acts as the perfect soundtrack to the precarious times we live in". The A.V. Club called it "passionately realized" in an A− review. Clash gave it an 8 out of 10 review, describing it as "wordless protest music that impresses with its sheer thematic ambition". Exclaim! awarded it 8 out of 10, saying "the goosebumps will cover most of your body". It charted at number 9 on their Top 10 Dance and Electronic Albums of 2017. The Quietus said that he had "lost none of his power to enthral, disturb and enthuse". Compassion was included in Albums of the Week lists by Rolling Stone, Entertainment Weekly and Vulture. It was album of the week on BBC 6 Music and Bleep. Holly Dicker of Resident Advisor described the music on Compassion as experimental. Tom Ewing of Freaky Trigger deemed it an album of electronica with shades of goth music.

== Track listing ==
All tracks are written by Matthew Barnes.

Compassion track listing
No.	Title	Length
1.	"War It"	5:54
2.	"The Highest Flood"	5:07
3.	"Panic"	4:48
4.	"Exalter"	5:36
5.	"Border Margin Barrier"	3:08
6.	"Arms Out"	5:47
7.	"Vandalism"	4:37
8.	"Sjurvival"	2:26
9.	"Raw Language"	4:28
10.	"Knife Edge"	6:16

== Personnel ==
=== Technical ===
- Matthew Barnes – production
- Carl Saff – mastering

=== Artwork ===
- Matthew Barnes – art direction

== Charts ==
Chart performance for Compassion
Chart (2017)	Peak position
Belgian Albums (Ultratop Flanders)	98
UK Independent Albums Charts	37
