= Boy King =

Studio album by Wild Beasts
- Released: 5 August 2016
- Studios: Dallas, Texas
- Genres: New wave; electronic rock; synthpop; indie pop
- Length: 39:07
- Label: Domino
- Producer: John Congleton

Wild Beasts chronology
Present Tense (2014)	Boy King (2016)	Punk Drunk & Trembling (2017)

Singles from Boy King
- 1. "Get My Bang" Released: 24 May 2016; 2. "Big Cat" Released: 7 July 2016; 3. "Alpha Female" Released: 6 February 2017

Professional ratings
Aggregate scores
Source	Rating
Metacritic	78/100
Review scores
Source	Rating
AllMusic	3.5/5 stars
Consequence of Sound	C+
Clash	7/10
DIY	4/5 stars
Drowned in Sound	7/10
Exclaim!	5/10
The Guardian	4/5 stars
Pitchfork	6.8/10
Record Collector	3/5 stars
Slant Magazine	2.5/5 stars

Boy King is the fifth and final studio album by Wild Beasts, released on 5 August 2016 through Domino Records.

== Background ==
Boy King is a concept album dealing with the self-destructive effects of modern-day masculinity. The album has a heavier sound than the band's previous work, featuring distorted synths, compressed drum machine-like beats and guitar solos, marking a big departure from the band's soft yet dramatic art pop sound, which was featured on their past four albums. It was recorded in Dallas, Texas with producer John Congleton, who previously helmed albums by St. Vincent and Swans.

== Accolades ==
Publication	Accolade	Year	Rank	Ref.
NME	NME's Albums of the Year 2016	2016	47	
Rough Trade	Albums of the Year	2016	47	
The Skinny	Top 50 Albums of 2016	2016	31	

== Track listing ==
All tracks are written by Wild Beasts.

No.	Title	Length
1.	"Big Cat"	3:07
2.	"Tough Guy"	3:31
3.	"Alpha Female"	3:45
4.	"Get My Bang"	3:33
5.	"Celestial Creatures"	4:28
6.	"2BU"	4:19
7.	"He the Colossus"	4:11
8.	"Ponytail"	3:38
9.	"Eat Your Heart Out Adonis"	3:56
10.	"Dreamliner"	4:44

Deluxe edition bonus track
No.	Title	Length
11.	"Boy King Trash"	20:53

== Personnel ==
- Tom Fleming – vocals, guitar, keyboards, sampler
- Hayden Thorpe – vocals, bass, keyboards, programming, vocoder
- Ben Little – guitar, keyboards, programming
- Chris Talbot – drums, percussion, keyboards

== Charts ==
Chart (2016)	Peak position
Belgian Albums (Ultratop Flanders)	63
Belgian Albums (Ultratop Wallonia)	80
Dutch Albums (Album Top 100)	182
French Albums (SNEP)	186
Irish Albums (IRMA)	23
Scottish Albums (Official Charts)	9
UK Albums (Official Charts)	9
