= Limbo, Panto =

Studio album by Wild Beasts
- Released: 16 June 2008
- Recorded: Recorded at Gula studion in Malmö
- Genres: Art rock, indie pop, cabaret
- Length: 41:38
- Label: Domino
- Producer: Tore Johansson

Wild Beasts chronology
Limbo, Panto (2008)	Two Dancers (2009)

Professional ratings
Aggregate scores
Source	Rating
Metacritic	79/100
Review scores
Source	Rating
AllMusic	link
Drowned in Sound	8/10 link
The Guardian	link
NME	8/10 link
Pitchfork Media	8.2/10 link
PopMatters	8/10) link
Spin	link
The Times	link
Uncut	link
Yahoo! Music	7/10 link

Limbo, Panto is the debut studio album by British art rock band Wild Beasts. It was released on 16 June 2008 by Domino Records, followed by the singles for "The Devil's Crayon" on 30 June and "Brave Bulging Buoyant Clairvoyants" on 16 October. The album was well received by critics.

== Track listing ==
1. "Vigil for a Fuddy Duddy" – 4:43
2. "The Club of Fathomless Love" – 3:44
3. "The Devil's Crayon" – 3:38
4. "Woebegone Wanderers" – 4:53
5. "The Old Dog" – 4:27
6. "Please, Sir" – 3:27
7. "His Grinning Skull" – 4:36
8. "She Purred, While I Grrred" – 3:30
9. "Brave Bulging Buoyant Clairvoyants" – 4:02
10. "Cheerio Chaps, Cheerio Goodbye" – 4:38

== Personnel ==
- Hayden Thorpe – vocals, guitar, piano
- Ben Little - guitar
- Tom Fleming – vocals, bass guitar
- Chris Talbot – drums, backing vocals
- Tore Johannson – production
- Jens Lindgard – engineering (GULA Studion, Malmö)
- Karl-Axel Bengtsson – engineering on tracks 1, 2, 3 & 9 (Varispeed, Malmö)
- S Rooke – mastering (Abbey Road Studios, London)
- Nick Scott – artwork
