= Two Dancers =

Studio album by Wild Beasts
- Released: 3 August 2009
- Recorded: Ledders Farm, Norfolk, January 2009
- Genre: Indie rock, art rock, dream pop
- Length: 37:26
- Label: Domino
- Producer: Richard Formby, Wild Beasts

Wild Beasts chronology
Limbo, Panto (2008)	Two Dancers (2009)	Smother (2011)

Singles from Two Dancers
- 1. "Hooting & Howling" Released: 20 July 2009; 2. "All the King's Men" Released: 5 October 2009; 3. "We Still Got the Taste Dancin' on Our Tongues" Released: 22 March 2010

Two Dancers is the second studio album by British indie rock band Wild Beasts. It was released on 3 August 2009 in the UK on Domino Records, with a US release on 8 September. The track "Hooting and Howling" was released as the album's first single on 20 July. Two Dancers was very well received by critics.

In 2010. It was awarded a silver certification from the Independent Music Companies Association which indicated sales of at least 30,000 copies throughout Europe. As of February 2018 it has sold 54,474 copies in United Kingdom and it remains their top selling album according to OCC.

== Reception ==
Professional ratings
Aggregate scores
Source	Rating
AnyDecentMusic?	7.6/10
Metacritic	83/100
Review scores
Source	Rating
AllMusic	4/5 stars
The Guardian	3/5 stars
The Irish Times	3/5 stars
Mojo	4/5 stars
NME	9/10
The Observer	4/5 stars
Pitchfork	8.4/10
Q	4/5 stars
The Sunday Times	5/5 stars
Uncut	4/5 stars

Aggregating website Metacritic reports a "universal acclaim" rating of 83% from notable critics. Pitchfork Media said, "Wild Beasts certainly aren't the first rock band to stand up society's dregs and outcasts, but few others immortalize them on such a wondrous, mythic scale." Drowned in Sound stated, "Two Dancers, then, doesn't so much follow up their debut as announce Wild Beasts as one of our genuinely special bands, one that can compete—in terms of both musical and lyrical ingenuity as well as sheer pop nous—with any US act you've seen talked up in the music press this year."

In 2010, Two Dancers was nominated for the Mercury Prize, which was subsequently won by the xx.

The album was also included in the 2011 revision of the book 1001 Albums You Must Hear Before You Die.

== Accolades ==
Publication	Country	Accolade	Year	Rank
Drowned in Sound	UK	Top 50 Albums of 2009	2009	#8
The Fly	UK	Best Albums of 2009	2009	#1
The Guardian	UK	Top albums of 2009	2009	#3
NME	UK	Albums of the Year	2009	#4
Pitchfork Media	USA	The Top 50 Albums of 2009	2009	#22
Q	UK	50 best albums of 2009	2009	#41
The Sunday Times	UK	The top 100 albums of 2009	2009	#5
NME	UK	Best Albums of the Decade	2009	#42

== Track listing ==
1. "The Fun Powder Plot" – 5:35
2. "Hooting & Howling" – 4:35
3. "All the King's Men" – 3:59
4. "When I'm Sleepy" – 2:09
5. "We Still Got the Taste Dancin' on Our Tongues" – 4:35
6. "Two Dancers (i)" – 4:06
7. "Two Dancers (ii)" – 2:37
8. "This Is Our Lot" – 4:32
9. "Underbelly" – 1:54
10. "Empty Nest" – 3:24
11. "Through the Iron Gate" (iTunes bonus track) – 5:37

== Personnel ==
- Hayden Thorpe – lead vocals (tracks 1, 2, 4, 5, 8, 9, 11), backing vocals, guitar, bass guitar, keyboards, production
- Tom Fleming – lead vocals (tracks 3, 6, 7, 10), backing vocals, bass guitar, keyboards, guitar, production
- Ben Little – lead guitar, production
- Chris Talbot – drums, backing vocals, production
- Richard Formby – production, engineering
- David Pye – engineering
- Lexxx – mixing
- Russell Fawcus – assistance

== Charts ==
Chart (2009)	Peak position
French Albums (SNEP)	193
UK Albums Chart	68
