= The Blueskins =

British band

- Years active: 1999–2008
- Label: Domino Records
- Past members: Ryan Spendlove; Andrei Nosov; Tom Bailey; Paul Brown; Matthew Smith; Ritchie Townsend
- Website: Official Website; Official Myspace page

The Blueskins were a four-piece band who were based in Gawthorpe, near Wakefield, West Yorkshire.

== Career ==
The band was formed by Ryan Spendlove and Paul Brown who met at music college in 1999. Spendlove was proficient in vocals, guitar, and ukulele, and before forming The Blueskins he has performed in bands since the age of 18. Spendlove is influenced from a wide range of music starting from his early childhood, including The Beatles. Blues, folk and gospel influences are all elements found within his music.

After college the duo continued to play together and drafted in school friends Smith and Townsend. In 2003 considerable interest in the band resulted in an influx of A&R men to Gawthorpe and a signing to Domino Records. Three singles, an EP and an album followed, and the band embarked on a tour of Europe and the United States, recording in Mississippi with record producer, Dennis Herring.

In 2005 a change of direction saw Smith and Townsend leave the band and, later that year, the remaining two founder members brought in the Russian former tennis professional Andrei Nosov on guitar and Welsh student Tom Bailey on five-string bass guitar to replace them. The new members brought with them a range of new influences including native Siberian music and dance-inspired indie.

The band spent much of 2006 writing new material and showcasing it to fans across the country. In the summer their 2003 single "Change My Mind" was featured on a television advertisement for Lynx shower gel. It generated considerable interest in the single, leading it to be re-released. Despite the interest from fans, the band's record label did not push the single and it received limited airplay. Finding themselves unable to market the band, and choosing to concentrate on their more commercial signings, Domino Records parted company with The Blueskins, leaving them on the lookout for a new label.

The band spent the latter months of 2006 touring their new songs and writing new material. At the end of the year they played a small gig in their local pub in Gawthorpe, inviting friends to take to the stage and perform with them. After writing new tunes and touring the UK for two years with the new line-up, they decided to disband in April 2008.

Following the split, Ryan Spendlove, the singer and frontman of The Blueskins started solo career. In January 2011 he signed a record deal with Candyrat Records in the United States where he recorded his first solo album in three days titled "Fable" which was released on 5 April 2011. Spendlove recorded all the tracks in three days in a live studio setting during the sessions in Chicago and Milwaukee. In 2012 his follow up, In Another World, was released again on the CandyRat Records label.

== Band members ==
- Ryan Spendlove – lead vocals, guitar
- Andrei Nosov – guitar, backing vocals
- Tom Bailey – bass, backing vocals
- Paul Brown – percussion
- Matthew Smith - bass
- Ritchie Townend - guitar

== Discography ==
=== Albums ===
- Word of Mouth (2004)

=== EPs ===
- Magic Road EP (2003)

=== Singles ===
- "User Friendly" (2003)
- "Change My Mind" / "I Wanna Know" (2004) - UK #56
- "Stupid Ones" (2004) - UK #61
- "Change My Mind" (re-release) (2006)
