= Vincent Fournier (photographer) =

French artist and photographer (born 1970)

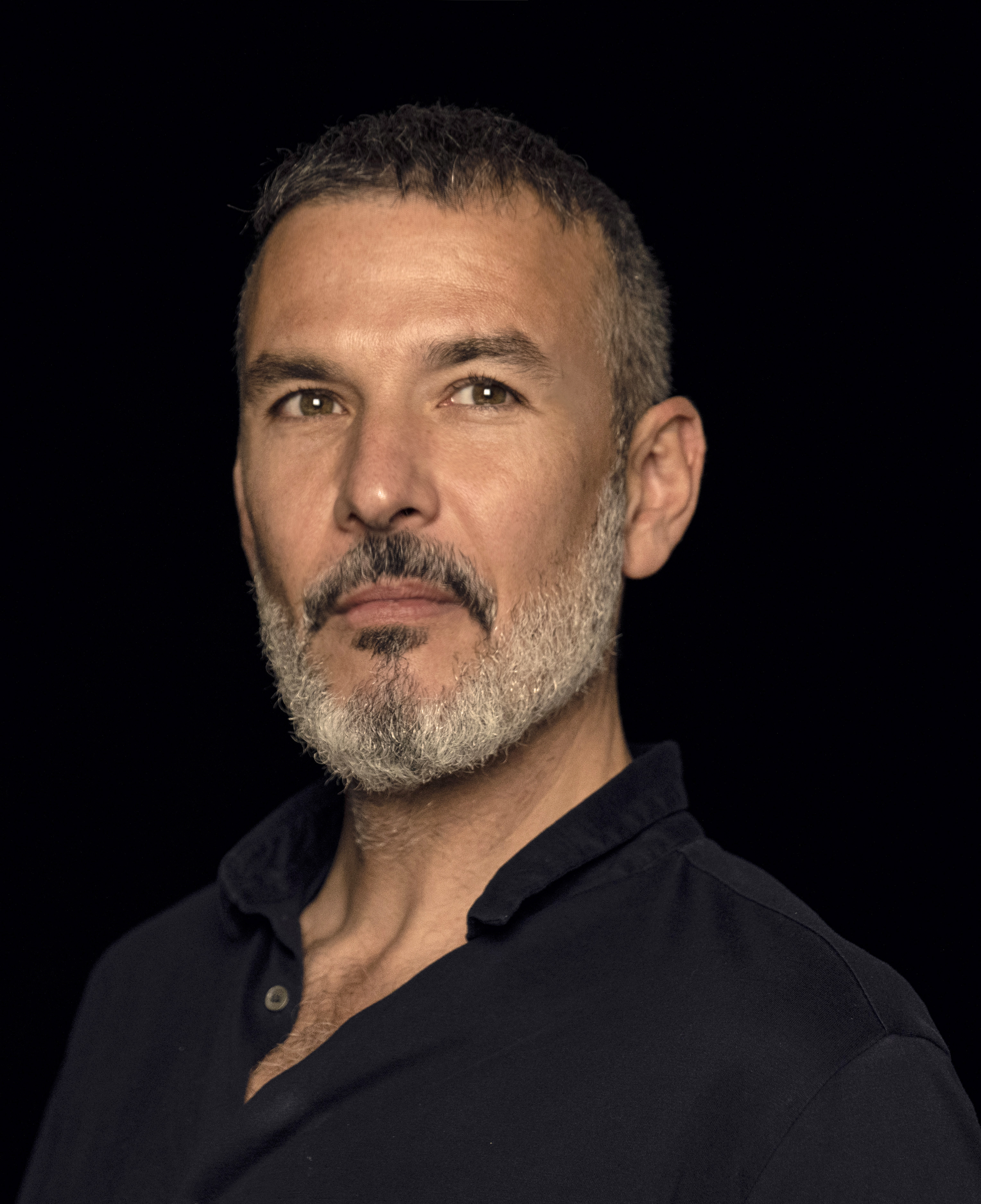
- Portrait of Vincent Fournier
- Born: 1970 (age 55–56); Ouagadougou, Burkina Faso
- Education: Ecole Nationale de la Photographie d’Arles
- Known for: Photography
- Website: Official website

Vincent Fournier (born 1970 in Ouagadougou) is a French artist and photographer. His works explore questions of science fiction, utopian stories, and different mythologies of the future such as the space adventure, humanoid robots, utopian architectures, and the technological transformation of the living. His vision is nourished by childhood memories, including visits to the Palais de la Découverte, which evoke the "scientific wonder". While photography remains his preferred medium, 3D printing, video, and installations sometimes accompany certain projects. Vincent Fournier's images are put in tension by oppositions that disturb our gaze: reality/fiction, logic/absurdity, past/future, magic/science, natural/artificial. He explores futuristic fiction and discovers in our present, or in the past, "glimpse of the future". After graduating in sociology and visual arts, he studied at the École nationale supérieure de la photographie in Arles, France and obtained his diploma in 1997.

In 2022, he was awarded "Prix Swiss Life à 4 mains".

His works are part of the permanent collections of the Metropolitan Museum of Art (MET) in New York, the Centre Pompidou in Paris, the Mast Foundation in Bologna, the Dragonfly Collection of the Domaine des Etangs in Massignac, the LVMH collection in Paris with the Bon Marché, the Baccarat collection in New York, Science Gallery Dublin, Musée des Ursulines de Mâcon, Fondation Bullukian in Lyon, and others.

He has participated in several major group exhibitions such as "The Universe and Art" at the Mori Art Tokyo and Art Science Singapore museums, "Unknown Unknowns An Introduction to Mysteries" at the Milan Triennial, "Art and Science Fiction, the Gates of Possibility" at the Centre Pompidou Metz, as well as solo exhibitions at the Museo d'Arte Moderna di Bologna (MAMbo) during Foto Industria 2018 and at the Rencontres d'Arles in 2014. He has collaborated with Louis Vuitton for French fashion designer Nicolas Ghesquière, Le Bon Marché (Paris), Hôtel Baccarat New York (Gilles&Boissier), Isetan Tokyo (Diesel) and for the film The Amazing Spider-man 2 with Columbia Pictures.

Vincent Fournier was the guest of the MET for a public presentation of his work on the occasion of the conference "In Our Time - A Year of Architecture in a Day in 2019". He lives and works in Paris, France.

== Acquisition from museums and foundations ==
- The MET – Metropolitan Museum of Arts in New-York.
- Centre POMPIDOU, Paris.
- Fondation Bullukian, Lyon, France.
- MAST Foundation in Bologna (Foto Industria).
- Musée des Ursulines de Mâcon, France.
- The St John of God Art Collection Western.
- The LVMH Contemporary Art Foundation.
- Domaine des Etangs Dragonfly collection (Primat – Schlumberger), Massignac.
- Baccarat Hotel Collection, New-York, United States.
- Science Gallery in Dublin.

== Selection of group, solo shows and Art Fairs since 2006 ==
2023:

- Musée de la Chasse et de la Nature – Post Natural Museum Exposition retrospective

2022:

- Prix Swiss Life à 4 main
- Triennale de Milan - Kyotographie
- KG+ "Post Natural History"
- Galerie 1839, Hong Kong
- Galerie Clementine de la Ferroniere, Paris
- Galerie Provost & Hacker, Liller.

2021:

- Musée des Beaux Arts des Ursulines, Post Natural History, Mâcon.
- MUCEM, Civilization, Marseille, France.
- Gallery GONGBECH, After the Rainbow, Republic of Korea

2020:

- Le Kiosque, Space Utopia, Nantes.
- The Cuturi Gallery, Past Forward, Singapour
- La Galerie 1839, Future Classic, Hong Kong.
- Atelier Jespers, Brasilia – Modernist Utopia, Brussels, Belgium.
- Shanghai Center of Photography (SCoP), People and Places, Shanghai
- Gallery GONGBECH, After the Raibow, Republic of Korea

2019:

- Fondation Bullukian, Space Utopia, Lyon.
- The Ravestijn Gallery, Amsterdam, Space Utopia, Hollande.
- Domaine des Etangs, Space Utopia, France.
- Spazio Nobile, Brasilia – A Time Capsule, Brussels, Belgium.
- MET – The Metropolitan Museum of Art, Presentation de Space Project pour l’évènement In Our Time: A Year of Architecture in a Day, New York, USA.
- Musée d’Art Moderne et Contemporain de Saint-Etienne, "Le Cerveau-Nuage", exposition Design et merveilleux.
- Mori Art Museum, Tokyo, The Future and Arts, Japan.
- Center for Contemporary Art, Beijing, Civilization, The Way We Live Now.
- Ballarat International Foto Biennale, To the Moon and back, Australie.
- Royal Museums Greenwich, Moonlight – 50 Years of Photographing the Moon, Londres, UK and Sweden.
- FOMU – the museum of photography in Antwerp, Maan/ Moon,Antwerp,
- Photo Brussels Festival, Post Natural History, Bruxelles, Belgique
- Biennale of Architecture (UABB), Space Project, Shenzhen, Chine.

2018:

- Bologna Museum of Modern Art, Mambo, Foto Industria, Fondazione MAST, solo show Space Project, Bologna, Italia.
- Centre Pompidou, Imprimer le Monde, group show, Paris, France.
- Vitra Design Museum, Hello, Robot, group show, Weil am Rhein, Allemagne.
- Australian Center for Photography (ACP), Archeology of the Future, solo show, Sydney, Australia.
- ArtScience Museum, The Universe and Art, group show, Singapour.
- MAK, Austrian Museum of Applied Arts / Contemporary Art, Hello, Robot, group show, Vienna, Austria.

2016:

- Mori Art Museum, The Universe and Art, group show, Tokyo, Japan.
- New Square Gallery, Past Forward, solo show, Lille, France,
- Perth Centre for Photography Post Natural History, solo show, Perth, Australia,
- Alliance Française, Post Natural History, solo show, Melbourne, Australia.
- PAD Paris Art Fair, gallery [Perpitch&Bringand], France.
- Spazio Nobile Gallery, Post Natural History, solo show, Bruxelles, Belgium.

2015:

- La Galerie, Post Natural History, solo show, Hong-Kong.
- Art Central fair, La Galerie, Hong-Kong.
- Amsterdam Art Fair, The Ravestijn Gallery, Amsterdam, Netherlands.

2014:

- Diesel Art Gallery, Past Forward, solo show, Tokyo, Japan
- Centre 798 Art Zone / Thinking Hands, Space Project, group show, Beijin, China.
- Z33 House for Contemporary Art, Space Odyssey 2.0, group show, Hasselt, Belgique.
- The Ravestijn Gallery, Past Forward, solo show, Amsterdam, Netherlands
- Architekturforum Aedes, Space Project, solo show, Berlin, Germany
- Quai 1, Post Natural History, solo show, Vevey, Switzerland
- Biennale Internationale de la Photographie et des Arts Visuels, Liège, Belgium.
- Festival Cortona On the Move, Italy.
- Festival Kyotographie, Kyoto, Japan.
- Festival Getxophoto, Bilbao, Spain.
- Magasin, Le Bon Marché, solo show, Brasilia, Paris, France

2013:

- Le Centre de la Photographie de Genève, False Fake, group show, Switzerland.
- le Centre d’Art Contemporain de Pontmain, La science à l’œuvre, group show, France.
- Science Museum/Fabrica, The Man Machine, solo show, Moscow, Russia.
- Netherlands Architecture Institute, Bio design, group show, Rotterdam, Netherlands.
- Science Gallery, Grow Your Own, group show, Dublin, Ireland.
- The Ravestijn Gallery, Post Natural History, solo show, Amsterdam, Netherlands

2012:

- Les Rencontres d'Arles, solo show, Arles, France Past Forward, Acte2 Galerie, Paris, France
- Joye Gallery, The Man Machine, solo show, Brussels, Belgium

2011:

- Clic Gallery, Space Project, solo show, New York, USA
- Bergamo Art Fair, 27AD gallery, Italy,
- Taipei Photo, Marunouchy gallery, Tapei.
- NoFound Photofair, The Contemporary Photography Fair, Paris
- Imagine Science Film Festival, New York, USA.
- A Theatre For Constructed Ecologies, group show, Berlin, Allemagne.

2010:

- The Empty Quarter Gallery, Space Project, solo show, Dubai, United Arab Emirates
- 27AD, Tour Operator, solo show, Milan, Italy
- Mouvement Art Public, Montreal, Canada.
- Miart, Milan Art Fair, Italy.
- Shanghai Art Fair, China.
- Tokyo Art Fair, Tokyo, Japan.
- Taipei Photo, Taiwan.
- London Art Fair, London, UK.
- The Step Gallery, Space Project, solo show, London, UK

2009:

- Marunouchi Gallery, Space Project, solo show, Tokyo, Japan
- Philipps de Pury & Co, Contemporary Photographs auction, London, UK.
- Tokyo Art Fair, Tokyo, Japon.

2008:

- Festival Image’08, group show, Vevey, Switzerland.

2007:

- Abu Dhabi Art fair, UAE
- Leonard Street Gallery, group show, The New Landscape, London, UK.

2006:

- Foire Art Paris, Grand Palais, Paris, France.

== Collaboration ==
- Baccarat Art Collection, New York Baccarat Hotel, curating by Gilles&Boissier of ten sculptures (3D) of the Synthetic Flesh Flowers, March 2015.
- ISETAN Department store Tokyo, Space Project, September 2014.
- The amazing Spider-Man II, 2013 — Columbia Pictures use some images from the Post Natural History and Space Project series to feature one of the main character's Art collection, Oscorp.
- Le Bon Marché, Paris, 2013 — Exhibition of the Brasilia series in the department store.

== Books ==
- Post Natural History, Noeve, Paris, 2019.
- Space Utopia, Noeve, Paris, 2018.
- Past Forward, 360°, Antwerp, 2012.
- Brasilia, Be Poles, Paris, 2012.
- Space Project, Verlhac, Paris, 2008.
- Tour Operator, AD, Brussels, 2007.

== Publications ==
AD, Art Press2, Connaissance des Arts, Dazed&Confuzed, Esquire Japan, European Photography, GQ Japan, HotShoe, Icon, Internazionale, Marie Claire Italy, MIR Russia, Mixte, Nowness, Officiel Art, Outlook China, Le Point, The Sartorialist, The Times, The Daily Telegraph, The Sunday Times, Wallpaper, Wired (Germany, Italy, UK, USA).
