= Hayden Thorpe =

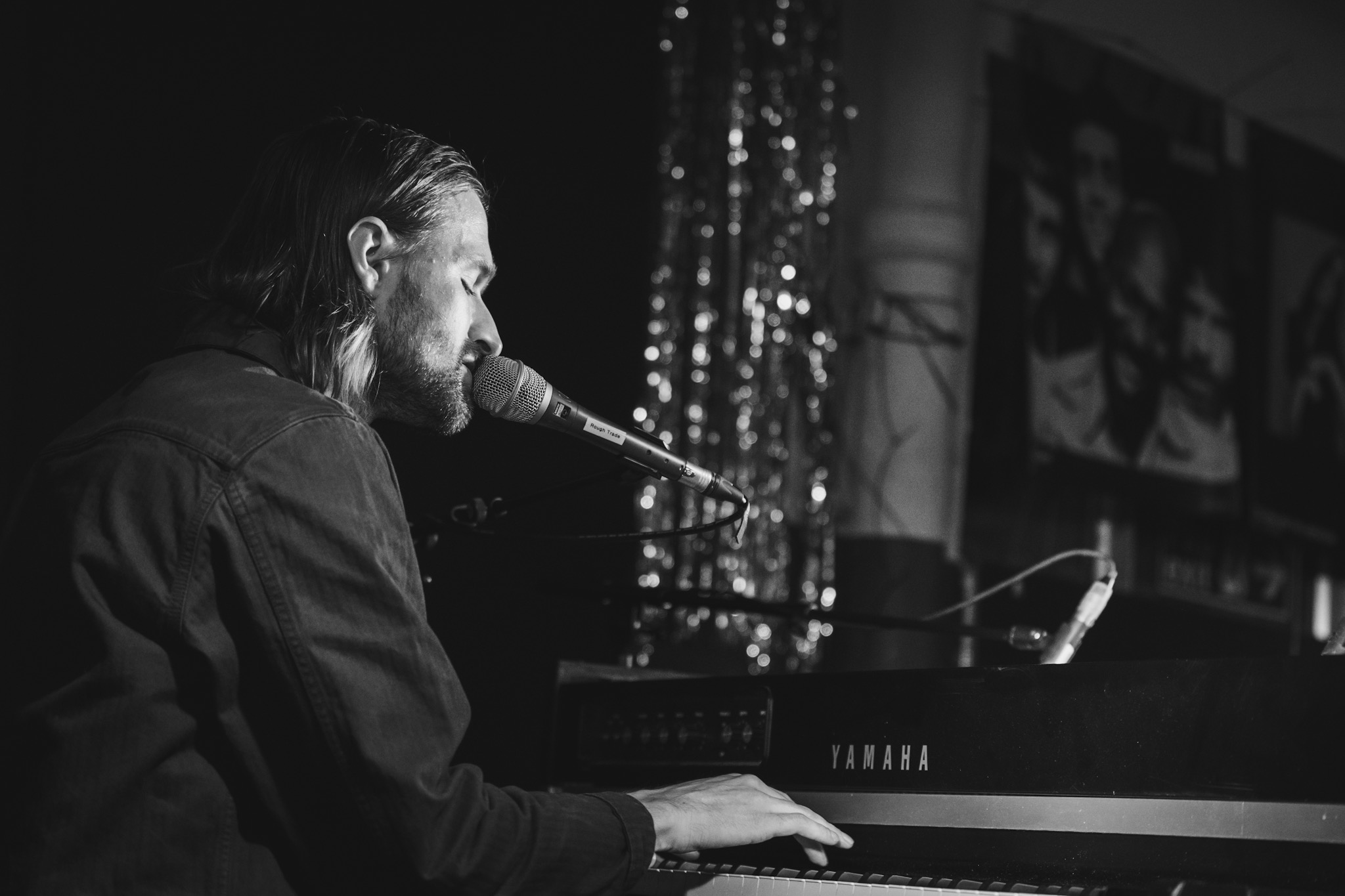
- Hayden Thorpe performing at Rough Trade East on 25 May 2019

Background information
- Born: Hayden Norman Thorpe; 18 January 1986 (age 40); Kendal, Cumbria, England
- Occupations: Singer-songwriter; musician
- Instruments: Vocals; guitar; bass guitar; piano; keyboards
- Years active: 2002–present
- Label: Domino
- Formerly of: Wild Beasts

Hayden Norman Thorpe (born 18 January 1986) is an English singer, songwriter and multi-instrumentalist, originally from Kendal, Cumbria and currently based in Walthamstow, London.

== Career ==
From 2002 to 2018, Thorpe was the frontman of the indie pop band Wild Beasts, which he initially co-founded as a duo with guitarist Ben Little. Eventually expanding into a four-piece, the band released five studio albums on Domino Records to much critical acclaim, yet only modest commercial success. Following the band's dissolution, Thorpe pursued a solo career, and released his debut album Diviner through Domino in May 2019. An EP, Aerial Songs, followed in 2020.

In July 2021, Thorpe announced his second album, Moondust for My Diamond to be released 15 October 2021 via Domino Records, the announcement came with a video for the song "The Universe Is Always Right". 7

In 2024, Thorpe released his third album Ness, a musical interpretation of author and poet Robert Macfarlane's book of the same name, about the Orford Ness nature reserve in Suffolk.

== Musical style and influences ==
Thorpe is often noted for his distinct, operatic countertenor vocal style, which critics commonly described as being both unusual and an acquired taste in the field of indie rock. Thorpe has cited Leonard Cohen, Kate Bush and The Smiths as amongst his musical influences, as well as writer Arthur Rimbaud on his lyrics.

== Discography ==
=== Albums ===
- Diviner (2019)
- Moondust for My Diamond (2021)
- Ness (2024)

=== EPs ===
- Aerial Songs (2020)
