= Wild Beasts =

English indie rock band

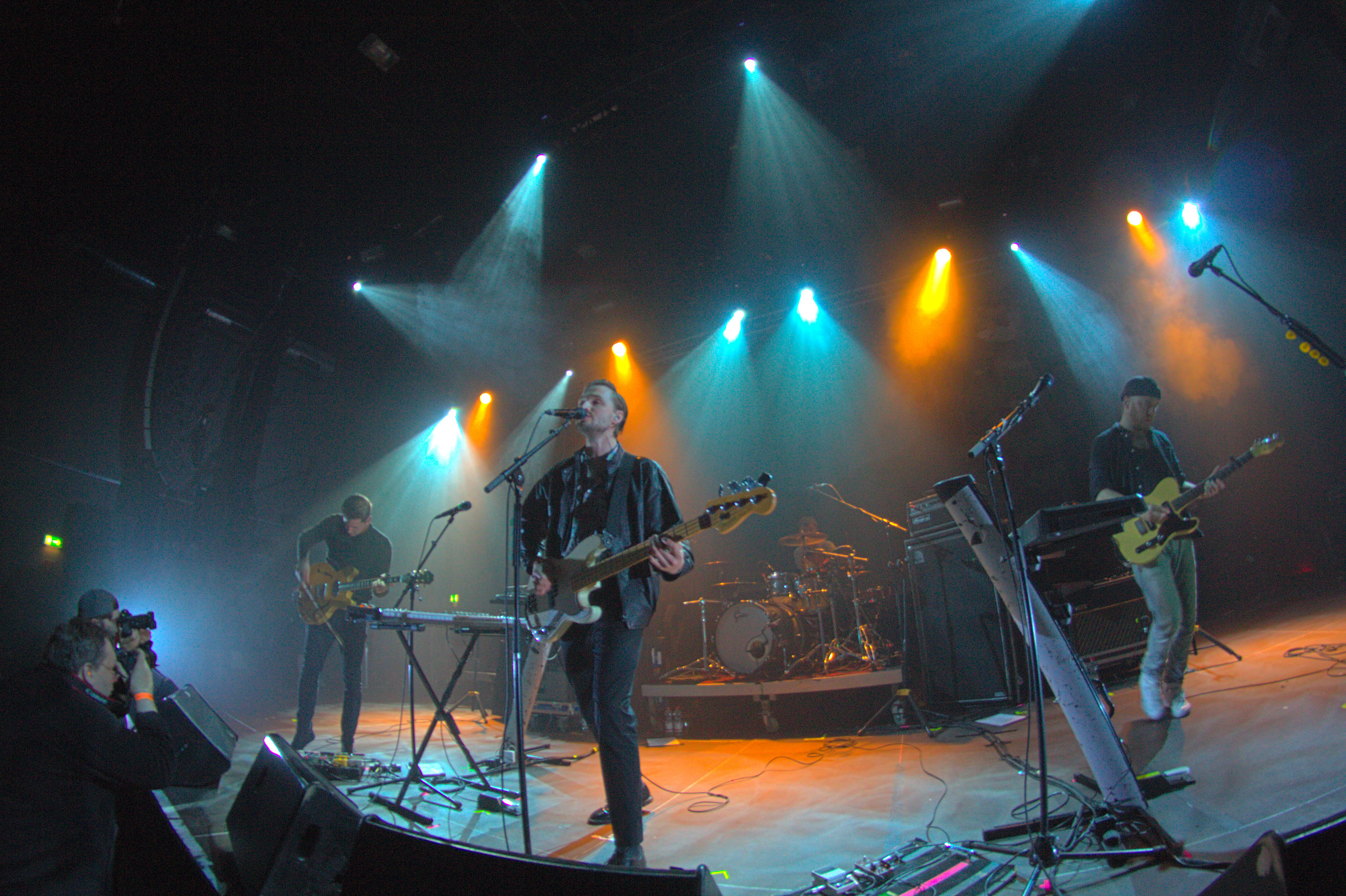
- Wild Beasts at Way Back When Festival in Germany in 2015

Background information
- Origin: Kendal, England
- Genres: Indie rock; art rock; dream pop; synthpop
- Years active: 2002–2018
- Labels: Domino; Bad Sneakers
- Past members: Hayden Thorpe; Ben Little; Chris Talbot; Tom Fleming; Gareth Bullock
- Website: Domino Records band profile

Wild Beasts was an English indie rock band, formed in 2002 in Kendal. They released their first single, "Brave Bulging Buoyant Clairvoyants", on Bad Sneakers Records in November 2006, and subsequently signed to Domino Records. They have released five acclaimed albums, Limbo, Panto in 2008, Two Dancers in 2009, Smother in 2011, Present Tense in 2014 and Boy King in 2016. Two Dancers was nominated for the Mercury Prize.

== History ==
In 2002, Queen Katherine School students Hayden Thorpe and Ben Little, then both sixteen years of age, formed the duo Fauve, the French term for "wild beast", and began writing songs together. In January 2004, classmates Chris Talbot, son of the school's music teachers Robert and Lesley, and bassist Gareth Bullock joined as drummer and bassist respectively and the band's name became Wild Beasts. At this time, the quartet had convened in a recording and rehearsal space dubbed Studio 6 in Kendal, where they recorded their eponymous demo EP in June 2004.

In September 2005, the band relocated to Leeds and Tom Fleming replaced Bullock as full-time bassist. All the bandmembers apart from Little studied at the local university, and played their first Leeds gig at Trash (formerly The Mixing Tin). The new quartet recorded two further demo EPs, Esprit De Corps and All Men.

Wild Beasts signed a deal with Bad Sneakers Records in August 2006. They recorded a live session of three tracks in November 2006 for Marc Riley's Brain Surgery on BBC Radio 6 Music. Bad Sneakers released "Brave Bulging Buoyant Clairvoyants" on 20 November. With Hayden's "enormous falsetto voice, which soars over chiming guitars", the single was placed at number 17 in the UK indie chart.

In February 2007, Wild Beasts signed to Domino Records. A second single was released on Bad Sneakers Records in April 2007, "Through Dark Night". In May 2007, music magazine NME listed Wild Beasts as one of ten bands "tipped for the top". Wild Beasts' debut album Limbo, Panto, described as "shocking, funny, and above all irrevocable", was released on 16 June 2008, with "The Devil's Crayon" single following on 30 June.

The band's second album Two Dancers was released in August 2009 and was widely acclaimed; it featured in many end of year best albums lists for 2009. It was nominated for the 2010 Mercury Prize. Wild Beasts' third studio album, entitled Smother, was released in May 2011. The band subsequently announced the addition of touring band member Katie Harkin from Sky Larkin. They won the 2011 London Awards for Art and Performance.

The band released their fourth studio album Present Tense on 24 February 2014.

Their fifth studio album, Boy King was released on 5 August 2016 also on Domino Records.

On 25 September 2017, Wild Beasts announced their disbandment. An EP, Punk Drunk & Trembling, was released on 20 October 2017. They released a live album, titled Last Night All My Dreams Came True, on 16 February 2018. The band came to an end in February 2018, following a final festival appearance at the Rockaway Beach Festival in January, and three final shows featuring songs from each of their five albums.

Both Thorpe and Fleming have since gone on to pursue solo projects. Thorpe released his solo debut Diviner in May 2019, whilst in July that year, Fleming reemerged under the name One True Pairing, releasing his self-titled debut album in September 2019. Thorpe has gone on to release two further studio albums, Moondust for My Diamond (2021) and Ness (2024), with Fleming releasing his folk-influenced second studio album Endless Rain in 2024.

== Discography ==
=== Albums ===
- Limbo, Panto (Domino Records, 2008)
- Two Dancers (Domino Records, 2009) UK No. 68
- Smother (Domino Records, 2011) UK No. 17
- Present Tense (Domino Records, 2014) UK No. 10
- Boy King (Domino Records, 2016) UK No. 9

=== EPs ===
- Wild Beasts (2004)
- Esprit De Corps (2005)
- All Men (2005)
- Reach a Bit Further (2011)
- Punk Drunk & Trembling (2017)

=== Live albums ===
- Last Night All My Dreams Came True (2018)

=== Singles ===
- "Brave Bulging Buoyant Clairvoyants" / "The Old Dog" (Bad Sneakers Records, 2006)
- "Through Dark Night" / "Please Sir" (Bad Sneakers Records, 2007)
- "Assembly" / "Sylvia, a Melodrama" (Domino Records, 2007)
- "The Devil's Crayon" / "Treacle Tin" (Domino Records, 2008)
- "Brave Bulging Buoyant Clairvoyants" / "Mummy's Boy" (Domino Records, 2008)
- "Hooting & Howling" / "Through the Iron Gate" (Domino Records, 2009)
- "All the King's Men" (Domino Records, 2009)
- "We Still Got the Taste Dancin' On Our Tongues" (Domino Records, 2010)
- "Albatross" / "Smother" (Domino Records, 2011)
- "Bed of Nails" / "Catherine Wheel" (Domino Records, 2011)
- "Reach a Bit Further" EP (Domino Records, 2011)
- "Stray" (digital download, Domino Records, 2012)
- "Wanderlust" / "Byzantine" (Domino Records, 2014)
- "Sweet Spot" (Domino Records, 2014)
- "A Simple Beautiful Truth" (digital download, Domino Records, 2014)
- "Mecca" (digital download, Domino Records, 2014)
- "Woebegone Wanderers II" (digital download, Domino Records, 2015)
- "Get My Bang" (digital download, Domino Records, 2016)
- "Big Cat" (digital download, Domino Records, 2016)
- "Alpha Female" (digital download, Domino Records, 2017)

=== Remixes ===
- Lady Gaga - "You and I"
- 2:54 - "You're Early"
- Jessie Ware - "Night Light"
- Nimmo and the Gauntletts - "Others"
- Elbow - "Gentle Storm"
