= Ed Harcourt discography =

- Studio albums: 16
- Extended plays: 3
- Compilation albums: 2
- Singles: 14
- Music videos: 12

This is the discography of the English singer-songwriter Ed Harcourt. To date, Harcourt has released sixteen studio albums, two compilation albums, three EPs, and fourteen singles (eleven of which have been released commercially). Harcourt's debut album Here Be Monsters was released in June 2001, and peaked on the UK Albums Chart at No. 84. His second album From Every Sphere, released in February 2003, became his highest-charting album at No. 39, and also features his highest-charting single "All of Your Days Will Be Blessed". Released only one year later was his third album Strangers, which features the single "This One's for You", Harcourt's second-highest-charting single at No. 41. Two further singles followed throughout the end of 2004 and 2005: "Born in the '70s" and "Loneliness". A download-only compilation entitled Elephant's Graveyard, collecting B-sides and rarities from 2000 to 2005, was issued in summer 2005. Harcourt's fourth studio album The Beautiful Lie was released in June 2006.

A compilation gathering some of Ed Harcourt's best work appeared in October 2007 as Until Tomorrow Then: The Best of Ed Harcourt, featuring the new single "You Put a Spell on Me". Additionally, a special limited-edition version of the best-of included a bonus disc of completely unreleased material. Harcourt's contract with Heavenly Records/EMI ended following the compilation's release; consequently, his Russian Roulette EP was released by American label Dovecote Records in May 2009. Following a "self-imposed sabbatical," Harcourt recorded his fifth studio album Lustre, released in June 2010. The album is also the first release on Harcourt's own record label, Piano Wolf Recordings.

== Studio albums ==
Year	Album details	Peak chart positions				
Year	Album details	UK	FRA	NOR	SWE	SCO
2001	Here Be Monsters: Released: 25 June 2001; Label: Heavenly (HVNLP31); Formats: CD, DL	84	—	—	28	—
2003	From Every Sphere: Released: 17 February 2003; Label: Heavenly (HVNLP39); Formats: CD, 2LP, DL	39	103	25	6	39
2004	Strangers: Released: 13 September 2004; Label: Heavenly (HVNLP49); Formats: CD, LP, DL	57	130	—	7	54
2006	The Beautiful Lie: Released: 5 June 2006; Label: Heavenly (HVNLP55); Formats: CD, 2LP, DL	97	—	—	31	—
2010	Lustre: Released: 14 June 2010; Label: Piano Wolf (PW001); Formats: CD, 2CD	125	—	—	—	—
2013	Back into the Woods: Released: 25 February 2013; Label: CCCLX (PW001); Formats: CD, DL	151	—	—	—	—
2013	Wizard Bounce: Released: 1 April 2013; Label: Self-released; Formats: DL	—	—	—	—	—
2016	Furnaces: Released: 19 August 2016; Label: Polydor; Formats: CD, DL	77	—	—	—	92
2017	Kakistocracy: Released: 20 January 2017; Label: Self-released; Formats: DL	—	—	—	—	—
2018	Beyond the End: Released: 23 November 2018; Label: The Point of Departure; Formats: CD, LP, DL	— (Note: Beyond the End did not enter the UK Album Chart but did peak at number 47 on the UK Independent Albums Chart.)	—	—	—	—
2020	Monochrome to Colour: Released: 18 September 2020; Label: The Point of Departure; Formats: CD, 2LP, DL	—	—	—	—	—
2020	Son of Maplewood: Released: 13 November 2020; Label: Self-released; Formats: DL	—	—	—	—	—
2021	Daughter of Maplewood: Released: 20 May 2021; Label: Self-released; Formats: DL	—	—	—	—	—
2021	S. Darko Score: Released: 29 October 2021; Label: Self-released; Formats: DL	—	—	—	—	—
2022	Grandson of Maplewood: Released: 15 April 2022; Label: Self-released; Formats: DL	—	—	—	—	—
2024	El Magnifico: Released: 29 March 2024; Label: Deathless; Formats: CD, LP, DL	— (Note: El Magnifico did not enter the UK Album Chart but did peak at number 6 on the UK Independent Albums Chart.)	—	—	—	26
"—" denotes a release that did not chart or was not issued in that region.

== Compilations ==
Year	Album details	Peak chart positions
Year	Album details	UK
2005	Elephant's Graveyard: Released: 8 August 2005; Label: Heavenly/Astralwerks (HVNLP54); Formats: Digital download only; Notes: B-sides and rarities collection	—
2007	Until Tomorrow Then: The Best of Ed Harcourt: Released: 15 October 2007; Label: Heavenly (HVNLP63); Formats: CD, CD/bonus CD, DL; Notes: Limited edition pressings include a bonus disc of unreleased material	191
"—" denotes a release that did not chart or was not issued in that region.

== Extended plays ==
Year	EP
2000	Maplewood EP: Released: 13 November 2000; Label: Heavenly (HVNLP27); Formats: CD, LP
2003	Watching the Sun Come Up Australian Tour EP: Released: 21 April 2003; Label: EMI (724355226525); Formats: CD
2009	Russian Roulette EP: Released: 5 May 2009; Label: Dovecote (DCR 0022); Formats: DL, limited edition bullet-shaped USB stick
2014	Time of Dust: Released: 6 January 2014; Label : CCCLX Music

== Singles ==
Title	Release date	Release info	Formats	UK Singles Chart	Album
"Something in My Eye"	11 June 2001	Heavenly (HVN101)	CD, 7" vinyl	85	Here Be Monsters
"She Fell Into My Arms"	10 September 2001	Heavenly (HVN104)	CD, 7" vinyl	—	Here Be Monsters
"Apple of My Eye"	21 January 2002	Heavenly (HVN107)	CD1, CD2, cassette	61	Here Be Monsters
"Shanghai"	8 April 2002	Heavenly (HVN110) [canceled]	Promo CD	—	Here Be Monsters
"Still I Dream of It"/"The Ghosts Parade"	28 October 2002	Heavenly (HVN121)	CD (limited to 3000 copies)	—	Non-album single
"All of Your Days Will Be Blessed"	3 February 2003	Heavenly (HVN127)	CD	35	From Every Sphere
"Watching the Sun Come Up"	19 May 2003	Heavenly (HVN130)	CD	79	From Every Sphere
"This One's for You"	30 August 2004	Heavenly (HVN140)	CD, 7" vinyl	41	Strangers
"Born in the '70s"	1 November 2004	Heavenly (HVN146)	CD, DVD, 7" vinyl	61	Strangers
"Loneliness"	14 February 2005	Heavenly (HVN149)	CD, 7" vinyl	59	Strangers
"Visit from the Dead Dog"	29 May 2006	Heavenly (HVN157)	CD, 2×7" vinyl	76	The Beautiful Lie
"Revolution in the Heart"	23 October 2006	Heavenly (HVN161)	DL, promo CD	—	The Beautiful Lie
"You Put a Spell on Me"	1 October 2007	Heavenly (HVN172)	CD, 7" vinyl	—	Until Tomorrow Then: The Best of
"Do as I Say Not as I Do"	June 2010	Piano Wolf	DL	—	Lustre
"The Way that I Live"	December 2014	BMG Chrysalis	DL	—	
"Restoration"	30 March 2015	Not on Label	DL	—	Non-album singles
"I Love You All the Time"	18 December 2015	Pay It Forward EODM	DL	—	Non-album singles
"I've Been Away for a While"	14 February 2020	Not on Label	DL	—	Non-album singles
"Like Sunday Like Rain Theme"	29 September 2022	Not on Label	DL	—	Non-album singles
"Tender Revenge"	7 April 2023	Not on Label	DL	—	Non-album singles
"With a Little Help from My Friends"	10 May 2023	Not on Label	DL	—	Non-album singles
"Signalman Jack"	6 June 2023	Not on Label	DL	—	Non-album singles
"Father of Sorrow"	19 September 2023	Not on Label	DL	—	Non-album singles
"Hit Record!"	19 September 2023	Not on Label	DL	—	Non-album singles
"Strange Beauty"	22 November 2023	Deathless Recordings	DL	—	El Magnifico

== Music videos ==
Year	Video	Director
2001	"She Fell Into My Arms"	Andy Hutch
2002	"Apple of My Eye"	Cyndi Rhoades
2003	"All of Your Days Will Be Blessed"	Barnaby Roper
2003	"Watching the Sun Come Up"	Barnaby Roper
2004	"This One's for You"	Type2error
2004	"Born in the '70s"	Kristy Gunn & Alexander Hemming
2004	"Loneliness"	
2006	"Visit from the Dead Dog"	DirtyUK (based on artwork by Tom Gauld)
2006	"Revolution in the Heart"	Good Times
2007	"You Put a Spell on Me"	Barnaby Roper
2008	"Until Tomorrow Then"	Piper Fergusson
2009	"Black Feathers"	Anonymous

== Compilation/soundtrack contributions ==
- Rogue's Gallery: Pirate Ballads, Sea Songs, and Chanteys (21 August 2006) – "Farewell Nancy"
- S. Darko (12 May 2009) – "Battleground"
- Son of Rogues Gallery: Pirate Ballads, Sea Songs & Chanteys (2013) – "The Ol' OG"

== Composer ==
- Like Sunday, Like Rain (2014)

== Side projects ==
- Arkhangelsk with Erik Truffaz (14 May 2007)
- Tenebrous Liar (Jul 2007)
- Vocals on the track "And Your Love" from the album 10 Pieces, 10 Bruises by Jonna Lee. (Oct 2007)
- Vocals on the track "Villain" from the album 8:58, a project by Paul Hartnoll.
