= Harvey Sid Fisher =

American singer-songwriter

- Occupations: Musician; actor; model
- Instruments: Vocals, guitar
- Labels: Amarillo, Dovecote
- Website: harveysidfisher.com

Harvey Sid Fisher is an American singer, songwriter, musician, actor, model, and screenwriter. He is best known for writing and performing mostly humorous songs about astrology, golf, the battle of the sexes, and quitting smoking. Greg Beets of the Austin Chronicle called him the "undisputed king of astrology songs."

Fisher has referred to himself as "one of L.A.'s top ten thousand photographic models."

== Biography ==
Fisher moved from New York to Los Angeles in 1969 to further pursue acting and music.

=== Actor ===
Fisher has performed in small television and film roles since 1967. Some of his credits include I Dream of Jeannie, Marcus Welby, M.D., The New Perry Mason, Kojak, Barnaby Jones, The Young and the Restless, Scrooged, and Lethal Weapon 3.

=== Screenwriter ===
As Harvey Fisher, he sold a screenplay titled Final Recourse which was filmed in Texas in mid-2013 and released in 2014 starring Chazz Palminteri, Teri Polo, and Terese Carrera.

=== Songwriter and singer ===
Fisher concurrently worked as a model, and musical performer. He made his first recording in the late 80s. He wrote the material for Astrology Songs from 1986 to 1987, which features songs about each of the twelve Astrological signs. Fisher was able to self-finance the recording of the album from the royalties he received from appearing in a Lincoln Continental TV commercial. Astrology Songs eventually got a proper release in 1993 on Amarillo Records.

Fisher's subsequent releases included the song "Mommy" which appeared on Nardwuar the Human Serviette Presents: Skookum Chief Powered Teenage Zit Rock Angst (Compilation) on NardWuar Records in 1995, the "Party Hard" 7" on TPOS records in 1997, the live version of “Those Girls” on Prayer Is The Answer (Cassette release compilation) on Temple Of Be Saint 777 records in 1998, the “F-Word!” song on Transmission One: Tea At The Palaz Of Hoon (Compilation) on Cosmodemonic Telegraph records in 2000, “I Want Sex” on Dr. Demento's Basement Tapes No. 10 (Unofficial CD Compilation) in 2002, and "Filled With Love" on the Dennis The Menace Buttflaps (CDr Compilation) on 777 Was 666 records in 2004.

In 2001, Fisher collaborated with the Chicago-based band, Cheer-Accident in covering "Those 52 Girls" for the B-52s tribute album Wigs on Fire! on Nihilist Records. Cheer-Accident also serves as an occasional back-up band for Fisher.

Fisher has also self-released the songs "Bonga Chong," "Battle of the Sexes," and "Kick that Butt" through his website.

In December 2009, Dovecote Records released the Harvey Sid Fisher: A Dovecote Holiday EP, of which Fisher covers the songs of Dovecote artists Mason Proper, Tim Williams, and Trevor Giuliani.
