= Hedgpeth Festival =

Music festival in Twin Lakes, Wisconsin

Hedgpeth was an alternative/indie music festival held in Twin Lakes, Wisconsin, on July 28/29, 2006.

The event is named for one of its organizers, Jeff Hedgpeth and was assisted by Autumn daughnn Bernier. The festival was held at Shadow Hill Ranch.

== Acts ==
The groups that performed at Hedgpeth 2006 were as follows:

- Primus
- The Flaming Lips
- Kings of Leon
- Rusted Root
- Peeping Tom featuring Mike Patton
- Hot Hot Heat
- They Might Be Giants
- Blue October
- Minus the Bear
- Slightly Stoopid
- Rock Kills Kid
- Jackopierce
- Rocco DeLuca and the Burden
- Living Things
- Los Amigos Invisibles
- Copeland
- Anberlin
- The Go! Team
- The Whigs
- Phantom Planet
- Murder by Death
- The Black Angels
- Luna Halo
- Stephen Kellogg and the Sixers
- Bottle of Justus
- June
- Trampled by Turtles
- Pomeroy
- Domestic Problems
- Sunday Runners
- Devotchka
- Red Letter Agent
- Aberdeen City
- The Apparitions
- Cloud Cult
- Hello Dave
- The Dog and Everything
- Ludo
- theBIV
- Ultra Sonic Edukators
- Trevor Hall
- Freshwater Collins
- The Richard Cranium Sideshow
- The Doomsday Social

== The Future of the Festival ==
Following the 2006 edition, Hedgpeth's future was uncertain, but organizers were optimistic even after the slightly lower than expected turnout. However, the promoters announced the event would not be continued after it lost an estimated $100,000 due to lack of ticket sales.
