= Old Wow =

Studio album by Sam Lee
- Released: 31 January 2020
- Genre: Folk
- Length: 47:53
- Label: Cooking Vinyl

Sam Lee chronology
The Fade in Time (2015)	Old Wow (2020)	songdreaming (2024)

Professional ratings
Aggregate scores
Source	Rating
Metacritic	82/100
Review scores
Source	Rating
The Telegraph	5/5 stars
The Guardian	4/5 stars
Mojo	4/4 stars
The Observer	4/4 stars
Uncut	7/10 stars
Americana UK	9/10 stars
Songlines	5/5 stars

Old Wow is the third studio album by English musician Sam Lee. It was released in January 2020 under Cooking Vinyl. It features guest appearances from Rowan "Dizraeli" Swaday, Cosmo Sheldrake and Elizabeth Fraser.

== Critical reception ==
Old Wow was met with "universal acclaim" reviews from critics. At Metacritic, which assigns a weighted average rating out of 100 to reviews from mainstream publications, this release received an average score of 82, based on 5 reviews.

== Track listing ==
No.	Title	Length
1.	"The Garden Of England (Seeds Of Love)"	4:16
2.	"Lay This Body Down"	4:47
3.	"The Moon Shines Bright"	4:13
4.	"Soul Cake"	6:00
5.	"Spencer The Rover"	4:51
6.	"Jasper Sea"	5:57
7.	"Sweet Sixteen"	3:10
8.	"Turtle Dove"	4:58
9.	"Worthy Wood"	4:11
10.	"Balnafanen"	5:23

== Charts ==
Chart performance for Old Wow
Chart (2020–2021)	Peak position
Scottish Albums (Official Charts)	45
UK Album Downloads (Official Charts)	42
UK Folk Albums (Official Charts)	13
UK Independent Albums (Official Charts)	8
