= Leo Abrahams =

English musician, composer, and producer (born 1977)

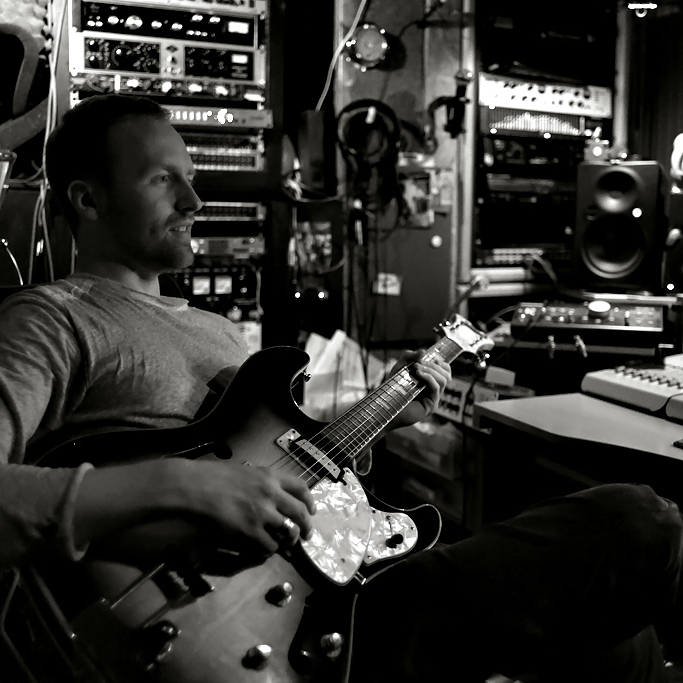
- Abrahams in his London studio in 2010

Background information
- Born: 28 November 1977 (age 48); Camden, London, England
- Genres: Modern classical; ambient; rock; English folk; electronica
- Occupations: Composer; musician; songwriter; producer; arranger
- Instruments: Guitar; keyboards; guitaret; bass; omnichord; guitorgan; lute; hurdy-gurdy
- Years active: 2000–present
- Labels: Just Music; Bip-Hop
- Website: www.LeoAbrahams.com

Leo Matthew Abrahams (born 28 November 1977) is an English musician, composer and producer. He has collaborated with Brian Eno, Katie Melua, Imogen Heap, Jarvis Cocker, Carl Barât, Regina Spektor, Jon Hopkins and Paul Simon. After attending the Royal Academy of Music in England, he started his musical career by touring as lead guitarist with Imogen Heap.

Since 2005, he has released six solo albums, largely in an ambient style involving complex arrangements and a use of guitar-generated textures. He has also co-written or arranged a variety of film soundtracks, including Peter Jackson's 2009 release The Lovely Bones and Steve McQueen's Hunger. Abrahams has produced Regina Spektor's album Remember Us to Life. Hayden Thorpe's Diviner, Editors' Violence and Ghostpoet's Dark Days + Canapés.

== Career ==
=== Early years ===
Abrahams attended the Royal Academy of Music. He studied under Steve Martland and Nick Ingman. During his studies, Abrahams was invited to join Imogen Heap's touring band. He left the Royal Academy of Music to tour England for several months.

=== Collaborative work ===
Through Heap, Abrahams was introduced to alternative folk artist Ed Harcourt, who Abrahams joined as a guitarist, playing lead guitar and scoring the instrumental parts on Harcourt's 2001 album Here Be Monsters, as well as Harcourt's subsequent albums.

A couple of years later, Abrahams had a fortuitous meeting with producer and ambient music pioneer Brian Eno in a Notting Hill guitar shop. Eno stated, "I spotted him trying out a guitar, the first I've ever seen in a guitar shop who wasn't playing 'Stairway to Heaven', so I thought he must be good." Eno invited Abrahams to his studio, and Abrahams contributed guitar to Eno's album with J. Peter Schwalm, Drawn From Life, which was released in 2001. Abrahams went on to contribute instrumentals to a number of musicians produced by Eno, including Grace Jones, Seun Kuti, Nick Cave, and Paul Simon's 2006 album Surprise.

In 2010, Abrahams joined with long-time collaborators Jon Hopkins and Brian Eno to create the album Small Craft on a Milk Sea. The album is based largely on a two-week period of joint improvisation, as well as "several years of jams between the three of us", and is officially described as "a Brian Eno album featuring Leo Abrahams and Jon Hopkins."

As a guitarist he has played on over 100 records by artists including Florence and the Machine, Annie Lennox, Marianne Faithfull and Badly Drawn Boy. With David Holmes he contributed several instruments and co-wrote several tracks on Holmes' release The Holy Pictures.

Abrahams has written with and produced for a variety of musicians. He contributed additional production to David Byrne and Brian Eno's Everything That Happens Will Happen Today, co-writing the lead single "Strange Overtones". His production credits include Katie Melua, Wild Beasts, Paolo Nutini, Frightened Rabbit, Oscar and the Wolf, Hotei, Karl Hyde solo album, Diagrams, Josephine Oniyama, Carl Barât (of The Libertines), Chris Difford (of Squeeze), Brett Anderson (of Suede), Iarla O'Lionaird, Sparrow and the Workshop and Kill It Kid. He arranged the string sections for the 2003 album Silence is Easy by Starsailor, also conducting the orchestra at Abbey Road Studios.

He has played guitar for Pulp on their 2011–2012 reunion dates, although he was not an official member of the band.

=== Solo albums and film scores ===
Inspired by his work on the film score to the 2003 film Code 46, Abrahams created his first solo album in 2005: Honeytrap, released on Just Music. It relies primarily on ambient sounds generated exclusively by guitars, rejecting keyboard effects, sampling, computer effects, or keyboards. The BBC referred to the album as "subtle, imaginative and sometimes intoxicatingly lovely." Scene Memory (2006), his second solo album, was also in an ambient style, with sounds created entirely by playing electric guitars through chains of laptop effects. A Boomkat review stated "Abrahams blends piano, guitar, and electronics to an almost euphoric effect – the record feels like you are walking in a dream." Sea of Tranquility reviewed the album saying "he respects a certain level of restraint – the solo guitar- putting into sharp relief the...limitless opportunities for the resultant sounds and form. This work is thoughtful, adventurous, and the result of a high degree of artistic integrity."

His third album, the 2007 The Unrest Cure, was initially built out of sessions in New York with David Holmes' rhythm section. Brian Eno, KT Turnstall, Ed Harcourt, Foy Vance, Pati Yang, Merz, Phoebe Legere, Kari Kleiv, and poet Bingo Gazingo also contributed to the album. It involves heavier guitar lines than the previous two albums. On his 2008 album Grape and the Grain, Abrahams continued to use English Folk themes, mainly with pieces featuring guitar, added instrumentation such as cello and medieval lute, and occasionally a hurdy-gurdy, which he learnt to play for the record.

He has released two further EPs on the Just Music label, and also released a vocal-based record on One Little Indian in 2011.

He has co-written or arranged a variety of film soundtracks, including Peter Jackson's 2009 release The Lovely Bones with Brian Eno, Steve McQueen's award-winning Hunger with David Holmes, Seeking 1906 with Simon Winchester, Gardens of Paradise, The Graduates, After Happily Ever After, and also on the Oceans series with David Holmes.

== Discography ==
=== Solo albums ===
- Honeytrap (2005)
- Scene Memory (2006)
- The Unrest Cure (2007)
- The Grape and the Grain (2008)
- Daylight (2015)
- Scene Memory II (2021)

=== EPs and singles ===
- EP1 (2006)
- Searching 1906 (2006)
- December Songs (2009)
- Zero Sum (2013)
- Yield (2022)

=== Collaborations ===
- 2000: "Last of England" by Sex Gang Children – composer, producer, all instruments
- 2001: Here Be Monsters by Ed Harcourt – guitar/string arrangements, guitar
- 2003: From Every Sphere by Ed Harcourt – orchestral arrangements, guitar/keyboard
- 2003: Silence is Easy by Starsailor (#2 UK) – string arrangements
- 2005: How the Mighty Fall by Mark Owen (#78 UK) – co-writer
- 2005: Elephant's Graveyard by Ed Harcourt – string/wind arrangements
- 2006: Madman in the Basket by Andi Sex Gang – production, guitars
- 2006: Musikain by J. Peter Schwalm – guitars
- 2007: Inventing New Destruction by Andi Sex Gang – laptop guitars
- 2008: Everything That Happens Will Happen Today with David Byrne/Brian Eno (#1 CMJ) – production, various instrumentals
- 2008: The Redcastle Sessions with Cara Dillon – co-production, guitars, piano, percussion
- 2008: The Holy Pictures with David Holmes – guitar, bass, various keyboards, marxophone and hurdy gurdy
- 2009: Slow Attack by Brett Anderson – co-writer, producer
- 2009: Come to Life by Natalie Imbruglia – additional production, guitar
- 2009: Frozen Heart EP by Smoke Fairies – production, keys
- 2009: Portraits of the Artists by Foy Vance – producer, co-writer, arranger, guitar, piano
- 2010: Ghosts by Smoke Fairies – producer
- 2010: Small Craft on a Milk Sea with Brian Eno and Jon Hopkins – co-writer, co-producer, guitar, guitaret, laptop
- 2010: Carl Barât by Carl Barât – co-writer, technical, guitar, mini-piano, omnichord, guitorgan, bass
- 2011: Death Fires by Carl Barât – producer, co-writer, arranger, guitar, piano
- 2011: Black Rainbows by Brett Anderson – co-writer, producer, guitar
- 2011: John Martyn Tribute by Paolo Nutini – producer, arranger, guitar, piano
- 2011: Cashmere If You Can by Chris Difford – producer, co-writer, arranger, guitar, piano
- 2011: Spitting Daggers by Sparrow and the Workshop – producer
- 2011: Foxlight by Iarla O'Lionaird – producer
- 2011: From Africa with Fury by Seun Kuti – producer
- 2011: Outside by Aisha Orazbayeva – producer/editor
- 2012: State Hospital (EP) by Frightened Rabbit – producer
- 2012: Portrait by Josephine Oniyama – co-writer, producer, instruments
- 2013: Pedestrian Verse by Frightened Rabbit – producer
- 2013: Edgeland by Karl Hyde – producer, co-writer
- 2013: EP by Olivia Chaney – producer
- 2014: Entity by Oscar and the Wolf – additional production and mix
- 2014: The Hand Gallery by Aisha Orazbayeva – engineer
- 2014: Present Tense by Wild Beasts – co-producer, session musician
- 2014: Caustic Love by Paolo Nutini – co-writer, co-producer, guitar, keyboards, programming, Wurlitzer, string and horn arrangement (Superfly)
- 2014: Lurrean etzanda by Ruper Ordorika – guitar
- 2014: New Beginnings by Hotei – co-writer, producer
- 2015: My Dreams Dictate My Reality by Soko – producer, engineering, guitar, hurdy-gurdy
- 2015: The Fade In Time by Sam Lee – mixed
- 2016: Remember Us To Life by Regina Spektor – producer
- 2016: EP 'S' by Emmy The Great - co-writer
- 2017: Silver Eye by Goldfrapp - programming
- 2017: Al Jamilat by Yasmine Hamdan - co-producer
- 2017: Dark Days and Canapés by Ghostpoet - co-writer, producer
- 2018: Violence by Editors - producer
- 2018: Songs You Make At Night by Tunng - co-mixer
- 2019: Diviner by Hayden Thorpe - producer, guitar, keyboards
- 2020: Album No. 8 by Katie Melua - producer, instruments
- 2020: Visitations with Shahzad Ismaily - producer, guitar, mixing, composer
- 2020: Krononaut by Krononaut (with Martin France) - producer, guitar, mixing, composer

=== Soundtracks ===
- 2007: Searching 1906 – writer, performer
- 2009: Five Minutes of Heaven – co-writer with David Holmes
- 2009: Hunger – co-writer with David Holmes
- 2009: The Lovely Bones – co-writer with Brian Eno, guitar
- 2010: Yohan: The Child Wanderer – orchestrator
- 2011 'After Happily Ever After' – composer
- 2012: "Gardens of Paradise" – composer
- 2012: "The Graduates/Los Graduados" – composer
- 2013: "The Outer Edges (Edgeland)" – composer
