= Racy =

Racy may refer to:

- Sexual suggestiveness
- Racy, West Virginia, U.S., an unincorporated community
- An unincorporated community in Chapin Township, Michigan
- Racy (album), a 2014 studio album by Hooray for Earth
- Mridula Ahmed Racy, Bangladeshi actress, businessperson and television anchor

== See also ==
- Racey (disambiguation)
