= Case Conrad =

Indie rock band

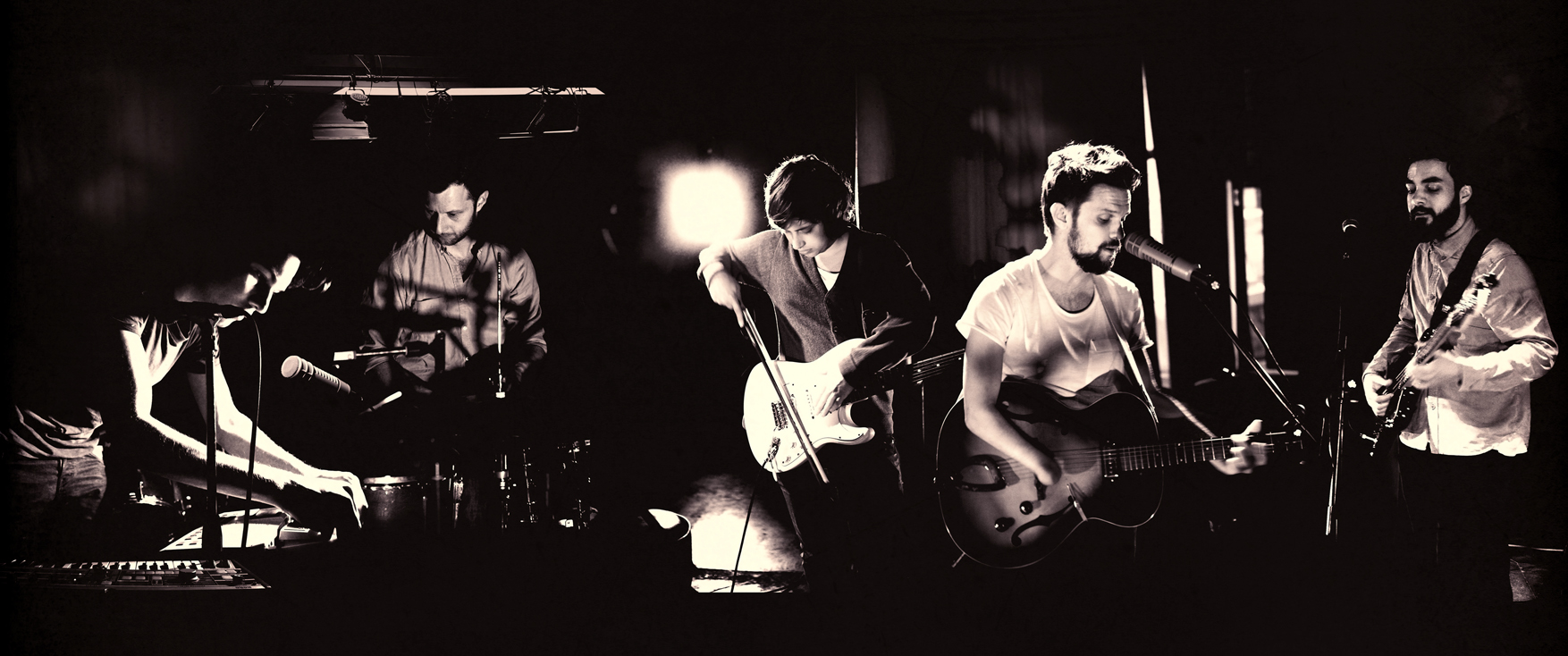
- Case Conrad 2013

Background information
- Origin: Malmö, Sweden and Barcelona, Spain
- Genres: Indie rock, Indie pop, Dream pop, Alternative rock, Folk rock
- Years active: 2009–present
- Labels: Stargazer Records, Red Olive, This Is Forte, FatCat Records
- Members: Gustav Haggren; Per Henrik Adolfsson; Robert Johansson; Petter Bengtsson; Vasco Batista
- Website: Official Website Case Conrad

Case Conrad is an indie rock band formed in 2009 and based between Malmö and Barcelona. Their sound has been described by Creative Loafing as “folk-and-surf-inflected dream pop.”

== History ==
=== Formation to A Tightrope Wish: 2009 – 2016 ===
Case Conrad was formed in 2009 by Gustav Haggren following the dissolution of his previous band, Gustav and the Seasick Sailors, which had released three albums over a five-year period. Haggren established the new project with Petter Bengtsson (Shooting John), Robert Johansson (The Tarantula Waltz), and Gustav Bjarnason.

All members had prior experience in other musical groups and initially approached Case Conrad as a project rather than a conventional band. The name was originally The Case of Conrad.

The group began touring shortly after forming in order to develop its sound. This period resulted in Dew Point, a live recording captured over two days in the Stockholm archipelago. Following the album’s release, the band undertook a three-month, coast-to-coast tour of the United States, during which they performed 55 shows.

After the tour, the band relocated temporarily to Barcelona, where songwriter Per Henrik Adolfsson, also known as Pancake, joined the group during the production of their second album, Leikko. With Adolfsson’s addition, Case Conrad became a dual-vocalist band. The album was largely self-recorded by the group in various locations. Drum tracks were recorded by John Roger Olsson (The Grand Opening) in Malmö, and the album was mixed by Cristoffer Roth (The Concretes, Moneybrother).

Leikko was released on Stargazer Records and received positive attention. The band later signed a publishing agreement with FatCat Records. In 2015, Case Conrad returned to the United States for a 32-date tour, performing alongside artists including The Pines and King of Prussia.

Following the tour, the members pursued individual projects. Haggren returned to Sweden to study creative writing, Johansson opened a restaurant in Barcelona, and Adolfsson focused on visual art. Bengtsson and the band’s fifth member, Vasco Batista, also participated in other musical projects.

In 2016, Case Conrad reconvened as a band. Their third album was recorded in Sauerland, Germany, with most of the material tracked live over a five-day period. The album was recorded and mixed by Michael Vögler and produced by the band. The album, titled A Tightrope Wish, was released on 30 September 2016 through Stargazer Records and This Is Forte. The album’s eleven tracks feature songwriting contributions from both Gustav Haggren and Per Henrik Adolfsson. Lyrically, the songs address personal experiences and themes drawn from the band’s lives and touring activities in Europe and the United States.

== Musical style ==
Case Conrad has been described as indie pop, indie folk, and indie folk rock. Creative Loafing described Leikko as "A set of organic, cohesive compositions that fuse the bright guitar pop of Soft Swells to the vulnerable urgency of Yo La Tengo, the hushed dynamics of Belle and Sebastian to the cloudy melancholy of '80s cult icons the Chameleons." Raw and Unheard noted the album for presenting Case Conrad's "unique blend of mellow pop and folk, track after track, with some rock and even electronic influences thrown in".

== Band members ==
- Gustav Haggren – vocals, guitar
- Per Henrik Adolfsson – vocals, guitar, synthesizers
- Robert Johansson – lead guitar, piano, organ, synthesizers
- Petter Bengtsson – drums, percussion, backing vocals
- Vasco Batista – bass, backing vocals

== Discography ==
=== Albums ===
Release date	Album title	Record label
2010	Dew Point	Red Olive
2014	LEIKKO	Stargazer Records

=== Singles ===
Release date	Single	Record label
2014	Lonelylightlylowshine	Stargazer Records
2014	Copper Thief	Stargazer Records
2014	The Years I Spent Punkrocking	Stargazer Records

=== Music videos ===
Release date	Title	Music Video
2014	Lonelylightlylowshine	Video Official Youtube Channel
2014	Copper Thief	Video Official Youtube Channel
2014	Promo for LEIKKO	Video Official Youtube Channel
