= Until Tomorrow Then: The Best of Ed Harcourt =

Greatest hits album by Ed Harcourt
- Released: 15 October 2007
- Recorded: Maplewood Studios, Ridge Farm Studios, Real World Studios, Aerosol Grey Machine Studios, Atlantis Studios, Toerag Studios, Funny Bunny Studios, Decibel Studios
- Genre: British rock indie pop chamber pop
- Label: Heavenly
- Producers: Ed Harcourt, Jari Haapalainen, Hadrian Garrard, Gil Norton, Tim Holmes, Tchad Blake

Ed Harcourt chronology
The Beautiful Lie (2006)	Until Tomorrow Then: The Best of Ed Harcourt (2007)	Russian Roulette EP (2009)

Professional ratings
Review scores
Source	Rating
AllMusic	link
BBC.co.uk	positive link
MusicOMH	link

Until Tomorrow Then: The Best of Ed Harcourt is the first best-of compilation from Ed Harcourt, released on 15 October 2007 in the UK via Heavenly Records and in the US on November 20, 2007, in the US via Astralwerks Records. The album collects some of his best work from 2000 to 2007. The first single was "You Put a Spell on Me," available on 1 October 2007. Initial pressings came with a limited edition bonus disc, featuring 16 unreleased tracks (plus one hidden track, a cover of "She" by Gram Parsons).

== Track listing ==
All songs written by Ed Harcourt, except where noted.

The best-of:

1. "Born in the '70s" – 3:15
2. "She Fell into My Arms" – 3:47
3. "Black Dress" – 3:16
4. "All of Your Days Will Be Blessed" – 3:43
5. "This One's for You" – 4:49
6. "Apple of My Eye" (Maplewood version) – 3:07
7. "Visit from the Dead Dog" – 3:04
8. "Something in My Eye" – 3:42
9. "Watching the Sun Come Up" (Harcourt, Hadrian Garrard) – 5:47
10. "Loneliness" – 2:50
11. "Fireflies Take Flight" – 4:36
12. "Shanghai" – 3:49
13. "Shadowboxing" – 3:23
14. "Whistle of a Distant Train" (previously unreleased version from Here Be Monsters sessions) – 3:39
15. "Until Tomorrow Then" – 3:56
16. "You Put a Spell on Me" – 4:12

Bonus disc:

1. "Hopeless" – 4:44
2. "Lord Give Me Fury" – 3:23
3. "Skullman" – 3:36
4. "Commandante des Mandrilles" – 2:06
5. "In Her Own Eyes" – 4:52
6. "Silent Film" – 4:43
7. "Lately I've Been Feeling Rather Strange" – 2:51
8. "Schifoso" – 1:18
9. "My Friends Are Cooler Than Yours" – 3:53
10. "Oh Drunken Wastrel" – 3:09
11. "One Big Shot" – 4:17
12. "A.D.D." – 0:53
13. "The Year We All Split Up" – 4:39
14. "Ultraviolent Love" – 4:41
15. "People Are Getting Younger" – 3:41
16. "I'm Sticking Around" – 2:00
17. "She" (Gram Parsons) (hidden track) – 5:09

== The best-of Credits ==
- Track 6: taken from Maplewood EP (November 2000)
- Tracks 2, 8, 12: taken from Here Be Monsters (June 2001)
- Tracks 4, 9, 11: taken from From Every Sphere (February 2003)
- Tracks 1, 3, 5, 10: taken from Strangers (September 2004)
- Tracks 7, 13, 15: taken from The Beautiful Lie (June 2006)
- Tracks 14 and 16 are previously unreleased (the original version of track 14 appears on the Maplewood EP)

== Singles ==
In the UK, there was one single released from the compilation:

- "You Put a Spell on Me" (1 October 2007); CD, 7" vinyl
  - CD:
  1. "You Put a Spell on Me"
  2. "Bella Donna"
  - 7" vinyl:
  1. "You Put a Spell on Me"
  2. "Sunday"
