= Wiseblood =

Wiseblood may refer to:

- Wiseblood (band), an electronic noise-rock band
- Wiseblood (Corrosion of Conformity album), 1996
- Wiseblood (King Swamp album), 1990

Wise Blood may refer to:

- Wise Blood, a 1952 novel by Flannery O'Connor
- Wise Blood (film), a 1979 film by John Huston
- Wise Blood (musician), an electronic musician

== See also ==
- Weyes Blood, musician
