= Racy (album) =

Studio album by Hooray for Earth
- Released: July 29, 2014
- Genre: Rock
- Length: 38:21
- Label: Dovecote

Hooray for Earth chronology
True Loves (2011)	Racy (2014)

Professional ratings
Aggregate scores
Source	Rating
Metacritic	69/100
Review scores
Source	Rating
AllMusic	3.5/5 stars
Pitchfork	6.4/10

Racy is the second studio album by American rock band Hooray for Earth. It was released in July 2014 under Dovecote Records.

== Track listing ==
No.	Title	Length
1.	"Hey"	2:35
2.	"Keys"	4:07
3.	"Say Enough"	4:38
4.	"Somewhere Else"	5:14
5.	"Racy"	3:13
6.	"Last, First"	5:31
7.	"Airs"	4:03
8.	"Happening"	3:50
9.	"Pass"	5:10
