= Racey (disambiguation) =

Racey is a British pop group.

Racey may also refer to:

- Racey Helps (1913–1970), English children's author and illustrator.
- Paul Racey, professor of natural history at the University of Aberdeen.
- George Racey Jordan (1898-1966) American military officer.

== See also ==
- Racy (disambiguation)
