= The Holy Pictures =

Studio album by David Holmes
- Released: 8 September 2008
- Genre: Electronic rock, electronica, krautrock, big beat
- Label: Go! Beat

David Holmes chronology
David Holmes presents The Free Association (2002)	The Holy Pictures (2008)

Singles from The Holy Pictures
- 1. ""I Heard Wonders"" Released: August 2008; 2. ""Holy Pictures"" Released: 2008

The Holy Pictures is the fifth studio album by David Holmes, released through Go! Beat on September 8, 2008. It is Holmes's first album since 2003's David Holmes presents The Free Association. The album departs from the eclectic soundtrack-to-an-imaginary-film style of his previous studio albums, in favour of a more personal approach.

To promote The Holy Pictures, Holmes released two singles "I Heard Wonders" and "Holy Pictures". The album was nominated for the 2008 Choice Music Prize as the best Irish album of the year, losing to Jape's Ritual.

== Background ==
David Holmes called The Holy Pictures his most personal record. It is the first Holmes' album where he performs most of the vocals, which wasn't initially planned, but after "all the music was nearly complete, he realised that no one else can sing on it but him". The album's personal feelings respond to the death of his parents, the loss of a friend, and the birth of his daughter.

The closing track "The Ballad of Sarah and Jack" is Holmes' tribute to his parents.

== Music ==
David Holmes, composing the album, drew inspiration from Herbert Hink (German minimalist pianist), Jesus and Mary Chain, La Düsseldorf, Blondie, early Brian Eno, Manoir, the Beach Boys, and Soft Machine.

The critics noticed a varied influence palette of influence reflected in the album's sound, most notably sourcing from Jim Reid's vocal style from The Jesus and Mary Chain; paying tribute to the psychedelic and hypnotic aspects of Primal Scream, Stone Roses, Spiritualized, Stereolab, My Bloody Valentine; and the motorik rhythm of Krautrock band Neu!, in particular on "Melanie". The Holy Pictures resemble Brian Eno in its "warm production" and "limpid, wistful instrumentals".

The Holy Pictures, for the most part, burst with "kaleidoscopic color". The first half "vividly approximates the decadent, ultraviolet-lit scene at a student-disco circa 1990, with a steady clip of head-rushed, stoned-immaculate pop songs". The instrumental song "Story of the Ink" refers back to the "nocturnal desolation" of Primal Scream's Trainspotting theme, until a tremolo electric-guitar and amplified frequencies gradually lifts the song into a "psychedelic splendor". At the back-end, these euphoric feelings progressively become more distant, somber, and "something more substantial than a blissed-out shoegazing nostalgia trip".

== Critical reception ==
Professional ratings
Review scores
Source	Rating
AllMusic	3.5/5 stars
Drowned in Sound	8/10
The Guardian	4/5 stars
Pitchfork	7.8/10

The album has garnered generally favourable reviews, and is seen as a successful departure from its predecessors. Thom Jurek, writing for AllMusic, called it "engaging, at times stunning", praising the pop aesthetic of the upbeat songs, while remarking that "there is that sadness at this album's heart that draws one in; it doesn't feel like mope or exorcism, just personal". Pitchfork added that the closing three songs "seek to recapture a certain back-to-the-womb comfort... and prove an affecting come-down to the preceding songs' sunglasses-at-night swagger".

Both critics praised the final song, "The Ballad of Sarah and Jack", lauding it as the most absorbing track, "gorgeous", and "unspeakably somber". Jurek also favoured the opener, "I Heard Wonders", calling it a "killer track".

BBC Music Magazine praised the alum, enjoying the unexpected stylistic direction and its heartfelt sound, but isolating "Theme/IMC" as a misfire, which "starts like Brian Eno but ends up sounding like a backwards cousin of Crockett's Theme".

== Track listing ==
All music and lyrics written David Holmes, except where noted.

No.	Title	Lyrics	Music	Length
1.	"I Heard Wonders"	David Holmes, Martin Rev	Holmes, Leo Abrahams	5:35
2.	"The Story of the Ink"			5:22
3.	"Love Reign Over Me"		Holmes, Gary Irwin	3:47
4.	"Theme / I.M.C."		Holmes, Abrahams	3:55
5.	"Holy Pictures"			5:19
6.	"Kill Her with Kindness"			4:03
7.	"Melanie"			3:59
8.	"Hey Maggy"			4:58
9.	"Birth"			1:07
10.	"The Ballad of Sarah and Jack"		Holmes, Jon Hopkins	4:27
Total length:				42:32

iTunes bonus tracks

No.	Title	Length
11.	"Return of the Nightfarmers"	4:28
12.	"The Dogs They Are Parading"	3:12
Total length:		7:40

== Personnel ==
Musicians

- David Holmes – vocals (1, 2, 3, 5, 6, 7), electronics (1, 2), CS80 synthesizer (3), glockenspiel (6), programming (1–4, 8, 9), sound effects (3, 4, 6), arrangement (2, 4–8), production (all tracks)
- Leo Abrahams – guitar (1–4, 6), bass (1, 7, 10), six string bass (10), keyboards (1), RMI electric piano (2, 4), guitaret (3, 4, 6, 7, 8, 10), mellotron (4), big string (5), marxophone and hurdy gurdy (7)
- Danny Todd – acoustic guitar and backing vocals (5), vocals (7), additional bass (10)
- Woody Jackson – chamberlin and glockenspiel (2), ring mod (5), recording (2, 5, 6, 8, 9)
- Scott Kinsey – RMI electric piano (5), CS80 synthesizer and toy piano (6), piano and organ (8), chamberlin (9)
- Jon Hopkins – piano and CS1 synthesizer (10)
- Tim Harries – bass (2, 4, 6, 8)
- Jason Falkner – bass (2)
- Donald Ross Skinner – bass (5)
- Jeremy Stacey – drums (1, 6, 7)
- Zack Danziger – drums (4, 5)
- Pati Hilton – backing vocals (3)
- Foy Vance – backing vocals (6), vocals (8)
- Tanya Mellote – additional bass (6), vocals (6, 7)
- Nina Holmes – vocals (8)

Production

- Dave Terry – assistant engineer (1, 2, 4, 6–8, 10)
- Hugo Nicolson – recording (1, 2, 4, 5, 6, 7, 8) mixing (1, 2, 4, 6–10), additional drum programming (2)
- Stephen Hilton – CS80 synthesizer (3), mixing (3, 5)
- Olga Fitzroy – assistant engineer (3, 5)

== Popular culture ==
The track "Love Reign Over Me" is featured on the episode "Freddie" (series 3, episode 5) of the UK version of Skins. The track "Holy Pictures" is featured in football video game Pro Evolution Soccer 2010. "Theme / I.M.C." previously appeared on the compilation The Oh Yeah Sessions '08 as "McCready Rides Again". The song "I Heard Wonders" was featured in the opening ceremony of the London 2012 Olympics and, later in 2012, as the theme for the first series of Dara Ó Briain's Science Club.
