= The Freezing Atlantic =

Studio album by Aberdeen City
- Released: October 25, 2005
- Genre: Indie rock, alternative rock
- Length: 46:23
- Label: Dovecote

Aberdeen City chronology
We Learned By Watching (2003)	The Freezing Atlantic (2005)

The Freezing Atlantic is Aberdeen City's second and final studio album. Its first single is "God Is Going to Get Sick of Me." It was produced by Nic Hard (Jesse Malin, The Church, The Bravery) for the 2005 release on Dovecote Records. Select tracks from the album were re-recorded and remixed with Steve Lillywhite for the 2006 re-release of the records on Sony's Red Ink/Columbia imprint. The album was re-released on August 8, 2006.

Professional ratings
Review scores
Source	Rating
AbsolutePunk.net	(86%) link
Allmusic	link

== Track listing ==
1. "Another Seven Years" – 3:49
2. "Pretty Pet" – 4:52
3. "God Is Going to Get Sick of Me" – 3:27
4. "Sixty Lives" – 4:05
5. "The Arrival" – 5:00
6. "In Combat" – 4:10
7. "Stay Still" – 6:03
8. "Brighton" – 7:26
9. "Best Chances Are Gone" – 3:24
10. "Mercy" – 4:05

== Personnel ==
- Ryan Heller – guitar
- Chris McLaughlin – vocals, guitar
- Rob McCaffrey – drums
- Brad Parker – vocals, bass
