= Russian Roulette (Ed Harcourt EP) =

Russian Roulette EP

EP by Ed Harcourt
- Released: 5 May 2009
- Recorded: February 2009
- Genre: British rock
- Length: 26:06
- Label: Dovecote
- Producers: Ed Harcourt, Dave Lynch

Ed Harcourt chronology
Until Tomorrow Then: The Best of Ed Harcourt (2007)	Russian Roulette EP (2009)	Lustre (2010)

Professional ratings
Review scores
Source	Rating
AllMusic	Not rated link
Aversion.com	link
God Is in the TV Zine	link

Russian Roulette EP is an EP by Ed Harcourt, released on 5 May 2009 worldwide by Dovecote Records. The EP was made available as a digital download-only release, and as a limited edition 512-megabyte USB stick in the shape of a bullet. The USB stick features album artwork, photos, and seven unreleased music videos. Official promo-only CDs were also released for radio promotion. The song "Caterpillar" was written by Ed about his newborn daughter Roxy, and the time she spent in an incubator shortly after her birth. Harcourt said, "It's the first song I've written about her. She was a little ill and we [Ed and his wife Gita] waited for her in the hospital for the chrysalis so we could take her home." The EP is also dedicated to her.

A music video was produced for the song "Black Feathers," which was directed by a "well-known British director who is contractually obliged to remain anonymous."

== Track listing ==
1. "Russian Roulette" – 5:43
2. "Sour Milk, Motheaten Silk" – 3:57
3. "Black Feathers" – 3:31
4. "Caterpillar" – 4:10
5. "Creep Out of the Woodwork" – 4:08
6. "Girl with the One Track Mind" – 4:53

== Notes ==
- All songs written and produced by Ed Harcourt.
- Recorded and mixed by Dave Lynch.
- Recorded and mixed at Ed's Studio, ICC Studios, and Wapping Press Studios.
- Drums on tracks 1, 2, 4, 5, and 6 by Raife Burchell.
- Backing vocals on track 3 by Gita Harcourt and Edie Langley.
- Violin on tracks 2 and 5 by Gita Harcourt.
- All other instruments played by Ed Harcourt.
- Mastered by Miles Showell at Metropolis.
- Dovecote Records #DCR 0022
