= Absofacto =

- Birth name: Jonathan Visger
- Also known as: Bug Lung Baby
- Origin: Michigan, U.S.
- Genres: Art pop; dance; indie rock
- Occupation: Musician
- Labels: Atlantic
- Website: absofacto.com

Absofacto is a solo project by musician Jonathan Visger, the former frontman of Michigan-based indie rock band Mason Proper. In 2008, Visger released his first solo efforts, North South, Pt. 1, under his own name, and Trilobite Trash, under the pseudonym Bug Lung Baby. In 2009, the EP Tagalong was released under the moniker Absofacto, which Visger has used for all his solo musical projects since.

In 2013, Visger and his Michigan childhood friend Brian Konicek, formed the electronic indie project Hollow & Akimbo. The duo released their first single, Pseudoscience, in October 2013, followed by Singularity in January 2014. In February 2014, they released their self-titled EP, Hollow & Akimbo, through Quite Scientific Records.

Visger continued to release music as Absofacto, gaining wider recognition in 2015 with the release of Dissolve. The song gained viral popularity on TikTok in 2019, leading to its chart success and his signing with Atlantic Records. He later released singles such as Lemon Drop and Rewind, further establishing his presence in the indie and electronic pop music scenes.

In 2017, Visger (as Absofacto) signed with Atlantic Records and released his major-label debut with the EP Thousand Peaces. The song "Dissolve", originally released in 2015, was included as a track on the EP and released as a single in 2018, but it failed to make any kind of impact. A year later, the song received renewed interest due to a meme on the video-sharing application TikTok and became a surprise hit. It debuted on the Billboard Alternative Songs chart in June 2019 and reached number one on the chart in January 2020.

== Discography ==
=== Albums ===
- Sinking Islands (2011)

=== EPs ===
- Trilobite Trash (2008)
- Kiko (2011)
- Loners: Vol. 1 (2013)
- Thousand Peaces (2017)
- Someone Else’s Dream (2020)

=== Singles ===
Single	Year	Peak chart positions					Certifications	Album
Single	Year	US Bub.	US AAA	US Alt	US Rock Air.	CAN Rock	Certifications	Album
"History Books"	2014	—	—	—	—	—		Non-album single
"Dissolve"	2015	22	20	1	3	8	RIAA: Platinum; MC: Gold	Thousand Peaces
"Light Outside"	2017	—	—	—	—	—		Thousand Peaces
"Endless Summer"	2017	—	—	—	—	—		Non-album singles
"Rewind"	2019	—	—	—	—	—		Non-album singles
"Lemon Drop"	2020	—	—	—	—	—		Non-album singles
"Someone Else’s Dream"	2020	—	—	—	—	—		Someone Else’s Dream
"Pop/Stars" (with Jasmine Clarke)	2020	—	—	—	—	—		Non-album singles
"Childhood Dreams" (with Jasmine Clarke)	2020	—	—	—	—	—		Non-album singles
"All the Things She Said" (with Jasmine Clarke)	2020	—	—	—	—	—		Non-album singles
"MoneyOnMyMind" (with Upsahl)	2020	—	—	—	—	—		Young Life Crisis
"Made Me This Way" (with Jasmine Clarke)	2020	—	—	—	—	—		Non-album singles
"Vibe Til I Die" (with Niteshift featuring love-sadKID and Limbo)	—	—	—	—	—			Non-album singles
"Unquit You" (with Niteshift)	—	—	—	—	—			Non-album singles
"I Just Think About You" (with Niteshift)	—	—	—	—	—			Non-album singles
"—" denotes a recording that did not chart or was not released in that territory.

==== As featured artist ====
Single	Year	Album
"Trouble" (The Knocks featuring Absofacto)	2017	Testify
