= Welcome to the Party =

Welcome to the Party may refer to:

- "Welcome to the Party" (Diplo, French Montana and Lil Pump song), a 2018 song from Deadpool 2
- "Welcome to the Party" (Pop Smoke song), 2019
- "Welcome to the Party", a song by PartyNextDoor from PartyNextDoor
- "Welcome to the Party", a song by Anna Vissi from Nylon

== See also ==
- "Welcome 2 the Party (Ode 2 the Old School)", a song by Kid Rock from Devil Without a Cause
