= Strangers (Ed Harcourt album) =

Studio album by Ed Harcourt
- Released: 13 September 2004
- Studios: The Aerosol Grey Machine, Skåne County, Sweden; Atlantis, Stockholm, Sweden
- Genre: British rock chamber pop
- Length: 46:55
- Label: Heavenly
- Producers: Jari Haapalainen, Hadrian Garrard, Ed Harcourt

Ed Harcourt chronology
From Every Sphere (2003)	Strangers (2004)	Elephant's Graveyard (2005)

Singles from Strangers
- 1. "This One's for You" Released: 30 August 2004; 2. "Born in the '70s" Released: 1 November 2004; 3. "Loneliness" Released: 14 February 2005

Professional ratings
Aggregate scores
Source	Rating
Metacritic	74/100 link
Review scores
Source	Rating
AllMusic	link
PopMatters	9/10 link
Rolling Stone	link

Strangers is the third studio album by British singer-songwriter Ed Harcourt.

== Track listing ==
1. "The Storm Is Coming" – 4:51
2. "Born in the '70s" – 3:15
3. "This One's for You" – 4:49
4. "Strangers" – 3:30
5. "Let Love Not Weigh Me Down" – 4:19
6. "Something to Live For" – 2:32
7. "The Trapdoor" – 4:49
8. "The Music Box" – 3:26
9. "Loneliness" – 2:53
10. "Open Book" – 4:39
11. "Kids (Rise from the Ashes)" – 4:31
12. "Black Dress" – 3:18

Bonus tracks

Japan release

13. "Every Night" – 2:49
14. "Epitaph" – 2:04

US release

13. "Only Happy When You're High" – 4:22

== Singles ==
In the UK, there were three singles released:

- "This One's for You" (30 August 2004); CD, 7" vinyl
  - B-sides: "Mysteriously" / "Deathsexmarch"
- "Born in the '70s" (1 November 2004); CD, DVD, 7" vinyl
  - B-sides: "Only Happy When You're High" / "Breathe a Little Softer" / "Born in the '70s" (video) / "This One's for You" (video)
- "Loneliness" (14 February 2005); CD, 7" vinyl
  - B-sides: "Epitaph" / "Every Night"

== Personnel ==
All songs written by Ed Harcourt, except where stated.

1. "The Storm Is Coming" (Ed Harcourt, Leo Abrahams)
  - Andy Young – Drums
  - Jari Haapalainen – Bass, percussion
  - Ed Harcourt – Piano, acoustic guitar, lead and backing vocals
  - Leo Abrahams – Lead guitar
  - The Bear – Maracas
2. "Born in the '70s"
  - Ed Harcourt – Acoustic guitar, bass, vocals, piano, clarinet
  - Jari Haapalainen – Drums, percussion, 12-string and 6-string acoustic guitar, bell
  - Hadrian Garrard – Backing vocals
3. "This One's for You"
  - Hadrian Garrard – Trumpet
  - Ed Harcourt – Piano, vocals, bass, Wurlitzer organ, electric tremolo guitar
  - Jari Haapalainen – Drums, percussion, electric guitar
4. "Strangers"
  - Jari Haapalainen – Drums, percussion, handclaps
  - Hadrian Garrard – Claps, triangle, handclaps
  - Gita Langley – Violins, backing vocals
  - Ed Harcourt – Wurlitzer organ, guitar, bass, handclaps, kazoo, lead vocals
5. "Let Love Not Weigh Me Down"
  - Ed Harcourt – Piano, guitars, bass, vocals
  - Gita Langley – Violins
  - Jari Haapalainen – Drums, percussion
6. "Something to Live For"
  - Hadrian Garrard – Chimes and bells
  - Ed Harcourt – Pump organ, vocals
7. "The Trapdoor"
  - Ed Harcourt – Acoustic guitar, Wurlitzer organ, vocals
  - Hadrian Garrard – Chimes and bells, timpani, megaphone, trumpet
  - Jari Haapalainen – Lead guitar, feedback
8. "The Music Box"
  - Hadrian Garrard – Trumpets
  - Jari Haapalinen – Drums, percussion
  - Ed Harcourt – Piano, guitar, bass, clarinet, organ, vocals
9. "Loneliness"
  - Jari Haapalainen – Drums, 12 string electric guitar and 6 string acoustic guitar, percussion
  - Ellekari Larsson (The Tiny) – Vocals
  - Ed Harcourt – Vocals, piano, bass, Solina string machine
10. "Open Book"
  - Ed Harcourt – Piano, Hammond organ, vocals, snare drum, Wurlitzer organ
  - Hadrian Garrard – Snare drum
  - Jari Haapalainen – Snare drum
11. "Kids (Rise from the Ashes)"
  - Ed Harcourt – Piano, bass, Hammond organ, synthesiser, vocals
  - Jari Haapalainen – Drums, percussion
12. "Black Dress"
  - Andy Young – Drums
  - Ed Harcourt – Bass, piano, guitar, Hammond organ, vocals
  - Hadrian Garrard – Trumpets
  - Jari Haapalainen – Bass drum, hi hat, claves, maracas

== Personnel ==
- Leo Abrahams – lead guitar
- The Bear – maracas
- Hadrian Garrard – trumpet, bells, chimes, backing vocals, megaphone, snare drum, timpani, triangle, handclaps
- Jari Haapalainen – percussion, drums, 6-string acoustic guitar, 12-string acoustic guitar, electric guitar, 12-string electric guitar, lead guitar, bass, feedback, bass drum, snare drum, hi-bat, Bell, maracas, claves, handclaps
- Ed Harcourt – vocals, piano, bass, guitar, Wurlitzer organ, acoustic guitar, Hammond organ, lead vocals, Clavinet, backing vocals, electric tremolo guitar, organ, pump organ, synthesiser, Solina string machine, kazoo, snare drum, handclaps
- Gita Langley – violin, backing vocals
- Ellekari Larsson – vocals
- Andy Young – drums
