= Lustre (Ed Harcourt album) =

Studio album by Ed Harcourt
- Released: 14 June 2010
- Recorded: Bear Creek Studios, Washington, and Kingsize Soundlabs, Los Angeles
- Genres: British rock, chamber pop
- Length: 49:00; 24:26 (bonus disc)
- Language: English
- Label: Piano Wolf Recordings
- Producers: Ryan Hadlock, Ed Harcourt

Ed Harcourt chronology
Russian Roulette EP (2009)	Lustre (2010)	Back into the Woods (2013)

Lustre is the fifth studio album from British singer-songwriter Ed Harcourt. The album was released on 14 June 2010 in the UK, and a day later in the US. The album is the first release on Harcourt's own label Piano Wolf Recordings, distributed through Essential Music Marketing (in North America, the album was released through Nice Music Group). The album follows his 2009 EP Russian Roulette, and is his first studio album since 2006's The Beautiful Lie. On his official MySpace blog, Harcourt said of the album: "It's got horns, violins, howling, mellophones, the Langley sisters, barks, whistles, hell I even sung down by a creek in the middle of the night." Harcourt told Direct Current that the album is "about that gleaming quality – the vitality, the passion – that drives you to keep going and not give up." A special edition of the album was also released in the UK, featuring a bonus disc of unreleased recordings. The album was preceded by the radio single "Do as I Say Not as I Do."

Lustre reached number 12 on the UK Indie Album Chart upon its release.

== Critical reception ==
Professional ratings
Aggregate scores
Source	Rating
Metacritic	76/100
Review scores
Source	Rating
AllMusic	4.5/5 stars
Drowned in Sound	(8/10)
Pitchfork	(4.3/10)

Geeks.co.uk awarded the album 5 out of 5 stars, and called the album "an open, honest and beautifully reflective album." AllMusic gave the album 4.5 out of 5 stars, saying the album is "a sweepingly romantic, epic, and sparkling collection of tunes that finds the British singer/songwriter ruminating on true love, money issues, and parenthood in a way that only a man who has found his place in the world can," and concluding that "Lustre takes on a kind of cinematic joy where Harcourt the long-suffering vampiric troubadour steps into the light and shines."

== Track listing ==
All tracks are written by Ed Harcourt.

Lustre
No.	Title	Length
1.	"Lustre"	4:06
2.	"Haywired"	4:15
3.	"Church of No Religion"	4:54
4.	"Heart of a Wolf"	4:16
5.	"Do as I Say Not as I Do"	4:09
6.	"Killed by the Morning Sun"	5:06
7.	"Lachrymosity"	3:05
8.	"A Secret Society"	4:33
9.	"When the Lost Don't Want to Be Found"	4:09
10.	"So I've Been Told"	4:21
11.	"Fears of a Father"	5:54

Illustrious (special edition bonus disc)
No.	Title	Length
1.	"Illustrious"	2:52
2.	"Words of Prey"	3:18
3.	"Pistols at Dawn"	2:54
4.	"A Public Sobriety"	4:02
5.	"Heart of a Wolf" (Instrumental)	4:17
6.	"A Very Good Impression of Myself"	3:16
7.	"Snow You've Been Cold"	3:53

== Personnel ==
Musicians

- Ed Harcourt – vocals, guitar, piano, organ, Hammond organ, synthesizer, glockenspiel, mellotron, Wurlitzer, sampling
- Gita Harcourt – violin, backing vocals, handclaps
- Edie Langley – backing vocals, handclaps
- Rosie Langley – backing vocals, handclaps
- Ashley Dzerigian – bass, double bass
- Raife Burchell – drums
- Joe Hadlock – accordion
- Matt Bricker – trumpet
- Kimo Muraki – baritone saxophone, tenor saxophone, mellophone

Production

- Produced by Ryan Hadlock and Ed Harcourt
- Recorded and mixed by Ryan Hadlock
- Assistant engineers: Amanda Barron, Matt Doctor, Reuben Cohen, and Trevor Spencer
- Mastered by Gavin Lurssen
- Photography by Steve Gullick
- Design and illustrations by Nikki Pinder
- Layout and assistant art direction by George Awad
