= Hooray for Earth =

American rock band

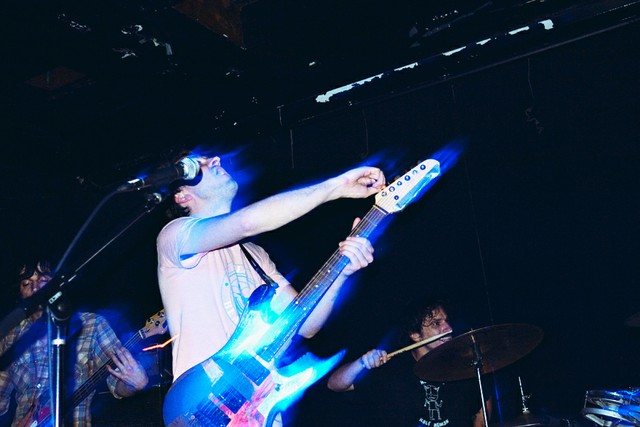
- Hooray for Earth live at CoCo 66 in Brooklyn, New York in 2010

Background information
- Origin: Boston, Massachusetts, United States
- Genres: Pop rock, experimental rock, electronic rock
- Years active: 2005–2014, 2022-2023
- Label: Dovecote Records
- Past members: Joseph Burstein; Noel Heroux; Christopher Principe; Jessica Zambri; Seth Kasper; Josh Ascalon; Gary Benacquista
- Website: Official website

Hooray for Earth is an American band and recording project founded by composer, singer and multi-instrumentalist Noel Heroux. While the first Hooray for Earth live show occurred in 2005, self-released home recordings date back to 2003.

The group played frequently in Boston, garnering attention from local publications. Heroux relocated to Manhattan in August 2007, generally pulling band activity toward NYC. On February 26, 2008, Dopamine Records released the six-track Cellphone EP.

In 2009, a second EP, Momo, was released by eMusic Selects. Dovecote Records later re-issued Momo (June 1, 2010) including an additional track, new artwork and CD/Vinyl formats.

In October 2010, Hooray for Earth's one-off single "A Place We Like" was released as a free download. The song, recorded at RAD Studio in Bushwick, Brooklyn, is a collaborative production between Hooray for Earth and Brooklyn musician Twin Shadow.

In July and August 2010, Heroux spent six weeks writing and recording material for Hooray for Earth's first full-length LP, True Loves. Heroux performed, engineered and produced the album, with Joseph Ciampini, Christopher Principe and Gary Benacquista entering the studio periodically with instrumental contributions. Several of the album's songs feature vocal contributions by New York City noise-pop group and frequent collaborators Zambri. The album was mixed by Chris Coady. True Loves was released by Dovecote Records on June 7, 2011.

London based record label Memphis Industries released True Loves in Europe in February 2012, with lead single "No Love" landing prominently on BBC Radio 1's playlist.

Dovecote Records released two stand-alone tracks, "Never" and "Figure", digitally in August, 2012. Pitchfork Media featured an accompanying music video in December.

On July 29, 2014, the group released their second LP Racy with Dovecote Records in the U.S. and Copenhagen's Tambourhinoceros label in Scandinavia. The album was recorded and produced by Chris Coady at Dreamland in upstate New York and DNA in New York City's East Village.

In November 2014, Hooray For Earth announced a final show hours before their set at Glasslands Gallery.

Noel Heroux signed with Sub Pop Records in 2015 and currently records under Mass Gothic.

Heroux produced Willy Mason's full-length Already Dead, released August 6, 2021 by Cooking Vinyl.

Hooray For Earth was announced as a special guest on several dates with Modest Mouse in 2022, some during the Lonesome Crowded West 25th anniversary tour. In February 2023 FLOOD shared unreleased track "La Que (Sabe)" in a feature covering a new Bandcamp Vinyl reissue of True Loves.

In 2023, Heroux digitally released a new Hooray for Earth album, Fantasy Something.

Guardian critic Paul Lester compared Hooray for Earth's work to that of MGMT, Orchestral Manoeuvres in the Dark, the Russian Futurists and Oberhofer.

== Discography ==
- Hooray for Earth (Dopamine, 2006)
- Cellphone (Dopamine, 2008)
- Momo (Dovecote, 2010)
- True Loves (Dovecote, 2011)
- "Never" / "Figure" (Single, Dovecote, 2012)
- Racy (Dovecote, 2014)
- Fantasy Something (2023)
