= The Beautiful Lie (album) =

Studio album by Ed Harcourt
- Released: 5 June 2006
- Genres: British rock, chamber pop
- Length: 54:24
- Label: Heavenly
- Producers: Jari Haapalainen, Ed Harcourt

Ed Harcourt chronology
Elephant's Graveyard (2004)	The Beautiful Lie (2006)	Until Tomorrow Then: The Best of Ed Harcourt (2007)

Singles from The Beautiful Lie
- 1. "Visit from the Dead Dog" Released: 29 May 2006; 2. "Revolution in the Heart" Released: 16 October 2006 (promo only)

Professional ratings
Aggregate scores
Source	Rating
Metacritic	67/100
Review scores
Source	Rating
AllMusic	4.5/5 stars
Contactmusic.com	4/5
Dotmusic	5/10 stars
Drowned in Sound	6/10
The Guardian	3/5 stars
MusicOMH	4/5 stars
Now	NN
Pitchfork	(1.9/10)
PopMatters	(8/10)
The Skinny	3/5 stars

The Beautiful Lie is the fourth album by British singer-songwriter Ed Harcourt, released in 2006. Ed's wife, Gita Harcourt, plays violin throughout the album and sings vocals on "Braille," and The Magic Numbers guest as backing vocalists on "Revolution in the Heart." Ed was dropped by Astralwerks Records/EMI in the US, the label which released his previous three albums. The album finally got a US release via Dovecote Records on 3 June 2008, nearly 2 years after its original release.

== Track listing ==
1. "Whirlwind in D Minor" – 3:57
2. "Visit from the Dead Dog" – 3:01
3. "You Only Call Me When You're Drunk" – 4:27
4. "The Last Cigarette" – 3:30
5. "Shadowboxing" – 3:20
6. "Late Night Partner" – 4:36
7. "Revolution in the Heart" – 4:20
8. "Until Tomorrow Then" – 3:56
9. "Scatterbraine" – 2:46
10. "Rain on the Pretty Ones" – 4:18
11. "The Pristine Claw" – 3:19
12. "I Am the Drug" – 3:31
13. "Braille" – 5:31
14. "Good Friends Are Hard to Find" – 3:52

UK iTunes-only bonus track

15. "Little Miss Secretive" – 3:24

== Singles ==
- "Visit from the Dead Dog" (29 May 2006)
  - CD b/w: "The Distance Between"
  - 7" vinyl No. 1 b/w: "Minotaur"
  - Amber-coloured 7" vinyl No. 2 b/w: "Blondes, Brunettes and Redheads"
- "Revolution in the Heart" (23 October 2006)
  - Digital download only. B-side: "Surreal Killer"
- "Until Tomorrow Then" (19 August 2008)
  - Music video single only.

== Personnel ==
1. "Whirlwind in D Minor"
  - Ed Harcourt – Piano, Spanish guitar, electric guitar, bass, music box, vocals
  - B.J. Cole – Pedal steel
  - Dimitri Tikovoi – Drums
2. "Visit from the Dead Dog"
  - Ed Harcourt – Piano, bass, synth strings, Hammond organ, vocals
  - Graham Coxon – Guitar
  - Jari Haapalainen – Drums
  - Hadrian Garrard – Trumpet
  - Leo Abrahams – Guitar
3. "You Only Call Me When You're Drunk"
  - Ed Harcourt – Piano, bass, bells, vocals
  - Jari Haapalainen – Drums
  - Hadrian Garrard – Trumpet
  - Leo Abrahams – Guitar
  - Fiona Brice – String arrangement
  - Violin – Gillon Cameron, Sally Jackson, Ellie Stanford, Gita Harcourt, Jess Murphy, Rosie Langley
  - Viola – Amy Stanford, Louise Hogan
  - Cello – Laura Anstee, Jonny Byers
4. "The Last Cigarette"
  - Ed Harcourt – Guitar, vocals
  - Gita Harcourt – Violin
5. "Shadowboxing"
  - Ed Harcourt – Guitar, bass, organ, vocals
  - Jari Haapalainen – Drums, shaker
6. "Late Night Partner"
  - Ed Harcourt – Piano, vocals
  - Johan Berthling – String arrangement
  - Violin – Lars Warnstad, George Kentros, Anna Rodell, Lisa Rydell
  - Cello – Anna Wallgren, Leo Svensson
7. "Revolution in the Heart"
  - Ed Harcourt – Piano, bass, casiotone, SK1, vocals
  - Jeremy Stacey – Drums
  - Jari Haapalainen – Drums
  - Michele Stodart – Backing vocals
  - Romeo Stodart – Backing vocals
  - Sean Gannon – Backing vocals
  - Angela Gannon – Backing vocals
  - Leo Abrahams – Guitars
8. "Until Tomorrow Then"
  - Ed Harcourt – Optigan, piano, vocals
  - Jari Haapalainen – Drums
  - Gita Harcourt – Backing vocals
  - Hadrian Garrard – Trumpet
9. "Scatterbraine"
  - Ed Harcourt – Piano, bass, organ, vocals
  - Jari Haapalainen – Drums
  - Johan Berthling – String arrangement
  - Violin – Lars Warnstad, George Kentros, Anna Rodell, Lisa Rydell
  - Cello – Anna Wallgren, Leo Svensson
10. "Rain on the Pretty Ones"
  - Ed Harcourt – Piano, vocals
  - Leo Abrahams – Guitar
  - Ellekari Larsson – Backing Vocals
  - Ane Brun – Backing Vocals
  - Jenny Wilson – Backing Vocals
  - Nina Kinert – Backing Vocals
  - Anja Bigrell – Backing Vocals
  - Amy Langley – String arrangement
  - Gita Harcourt – String arrangement
  - Violin – Gillon Cameron, Sally Jackson, Ellie Stanford, Gita Harcourt, Jess Murphy, Rosie Langley
  - Viola – Amy Stanford, Louise Hogan
  - Cello – Laura Anstee, Jonny Byers
11. "The Pristine Claw"
  - Ed Harcourt – Guitar, vocals
  - Leo Abrahams – Guitar
  - Johan Berthling – Woodwind arrangement
  - Thomas Bodin – Oboe
12. "I Am the Drug"
  - Ed Harcourt – Piano, bass, vocals
  - Jari Haapalainen – Drums
  - Leo Abrahams – Guitars
  - Fiona Brice – String arrangement
  - Violin – Gillon Cameron, Sally Jackson, Ellie Stanford, Gita Harcourt, Jess Murphy, Rosie Langley
  - Viola – Amy Stanford, Louise Hogan
  - Cello – Laura Anstee, Jonny Byers
13. "Braille"
  - Ed Harcourt – Guitar, piano, vocals
  - Gita Harcourt – Vocals
  - Leo Abrahams – Baritone guitar, guitar treatments
  - Jari Haapalainen – Percussion
14. "Good Friends Are Hard to Find"
  - Ed Harcourt – Piano, vocals
  - Hadrian Garrard – Trumpet
  - Leo Abrahams – String arrangement
  - Violin – Gillon Cameron, Sally Jackson, Ellie Stanford, Gita Harcourt, Jess Murphy, Rosie Langley
  - Viola – Amy Stanford, Louise Hogan
  - Cello – Laura Anstee, Jonny Byers
