= Sam Lee (folk musician) =

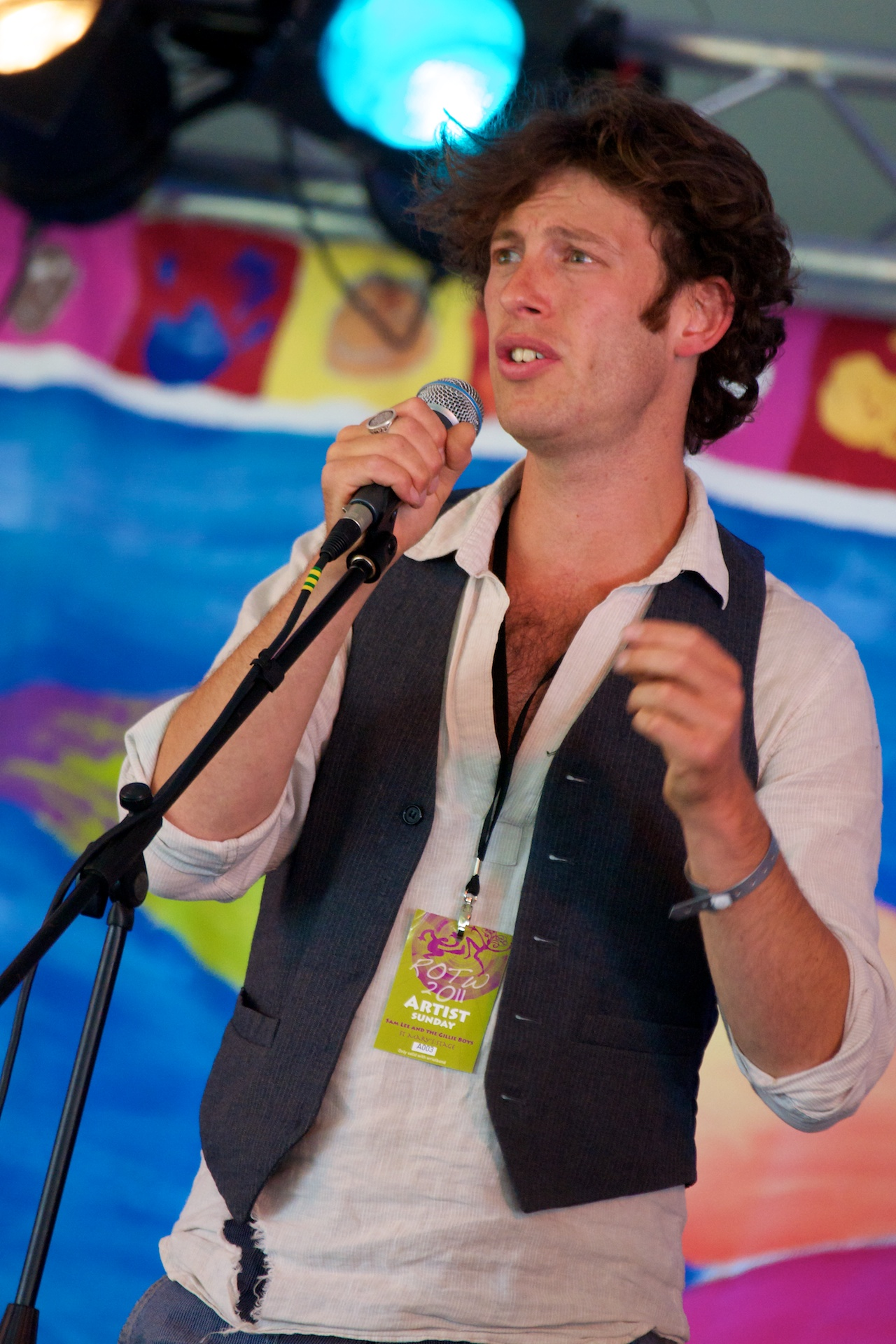
- Lee at Rhythms of The World 2011

Background information
- Born: 6 July 1980 (age 46)
- Genres: Folk
- Occupations: Singer-songwriter, musician
- Years active: 2012–present
- Website: samleesong.co.uk

Sam Lee (born 6 July 1980) is an English folk singer and traditional music specialist. His debut album Ground of its Own was shortlisted for the 2012 Mercury Music Award. Lee performs as part of an ensemble, Sam Lee and Friends.

Lee became known as a traditional music specialist dedicated to collecting, restoring and sharing ancient music from Britain and Ireland, in particular from the Romany Gypsy and Irish traveller communities. Lee has spent much time collecting songs from these communities. Lee's debut album has been described as "the result of six years of complete immersion in traditional British folk music." His music involves re-working and instrumental arrangements of songs from the tradition.

Lee is the creator and manager of the folk-music promotional network The Nest Collective, which hosts various folk music events in London and beyond. Lee regularly works with the English Folk Dance and Song Society to archive and curate traditional music as well as educate through writings and classes.

== Biography ==
Lee grew up in Leeds and later studied art at Chelsea College of Art. Both of Lee's parents are Jewish. In 2008 Lee met Stanley Robertson, nephew of Jeannie Robertson, Scottish Traveller and ballad singer. Robertson took Lee on as a student and apprentice, teaching him many of his songs before his death in 2009.

Lee reached a broader audience with his performance of "The Tan Yard Side" to the accompaniment of nightingale song in a BBC Radio 4 broadcast on 19 May 2014, marking the 90th anniversary of the first broadcast of Singing with the Nightingales by cellist Beatrice Harrison on 19 May 1924, which was the first-ever BBC live wildlife outside broadcast (i.e. not from a radio studio), becoming a regular annual BBC radio event until interrupted by World War II. Lee's radio work continued in 2019 when two programmes called "The Song Hunters" were broadcast on BBC Radio 4. Continuing his interest in birds, Lee helped produce "Let Nature Sing", a collection of bird song for the RSPB which reached number 18 in the UK singles chart.

Before becoming a folk singer, Lee was a wilderness survival expert, and once travelled as a student of Ray Mears. On his change of career Lee notes "What is wilderness in this country, where there is no real unspoilt land? I see wilderness in Britain as stinging nettles submerging a disused rubbish tip. Or a Gypsy camp, washing hanging between the caravans. Gypsies and nettles fit into any landscape, and Gypsy folk song is made-up cultural nettles." Lee lives and works in Dalston, London, but spends a lot of his time promoting and managing folk music events and collecting songs around the UK.

== Band ==
The instrumentation of Lee's music follows a "roots and wings" concept of how traditional music needs to thrive to survive. The instrumental mix is a modern fusion and re-working of traditional sounds. The band consists of Lee's vocals and Shruti box work, accompanied by the Jew's harp combined with klezmeresque cello, tabla, Japanese koto, ukulele, violins and percussion.

=== Personnel ===
- Sam Lee – vocals, Jew's harp, shruti box
- Francesca Terberg – cello
- Jonah Brody – Japanese koto, ukulele
- Steve Chadwick – trumpet, cornet
- Camilo Tirado – tabla, percussion, cantele
- Flora Curzon – violin

== Awards and commendation ==
In 2010, Lee's folk club-night, The Magpies Nest, won Best Folk Club in the 2010 BBC Radio 2 Folk Awards. Lee was nominated in the 2013 BBC Folk Awards for folk singer of the year, best album for Ground of its Own and best traditional track for "Wild Wood Amber". In 2011, the Arts Foundation Award honoured folk music amongst the art forms for the first time, with Lee going on to win.

Sam Lee and Friends were sent by the British Arts Council to visit Sudan to perform at the Khartoum International Music Festival, which was being staged for the first time in 13 years. As well as performing a set of his own material, Lee also worked on a collaborative performance with two Sudanese musicians, Omer Ihsas and Dr. Alfateh Hussain. In 2012, Lee's debut album, Ground of its Own received a Mercury Prize Album of the Year nomination. The album also won the Album of the Year award in the 2012 fRoots Critics Poll. In 2016, the album The Fade in Time won the Songlines Music Award in the category Europe.

== Discography ==
- Ground of its Own (2012)
- More For to Rise (EP, 2014)
- The Fade in Time (2015)
- Old Wow (2020)
- Songdreaming (2024)
