= Wise Blood (musician) =

American singer-songwriter

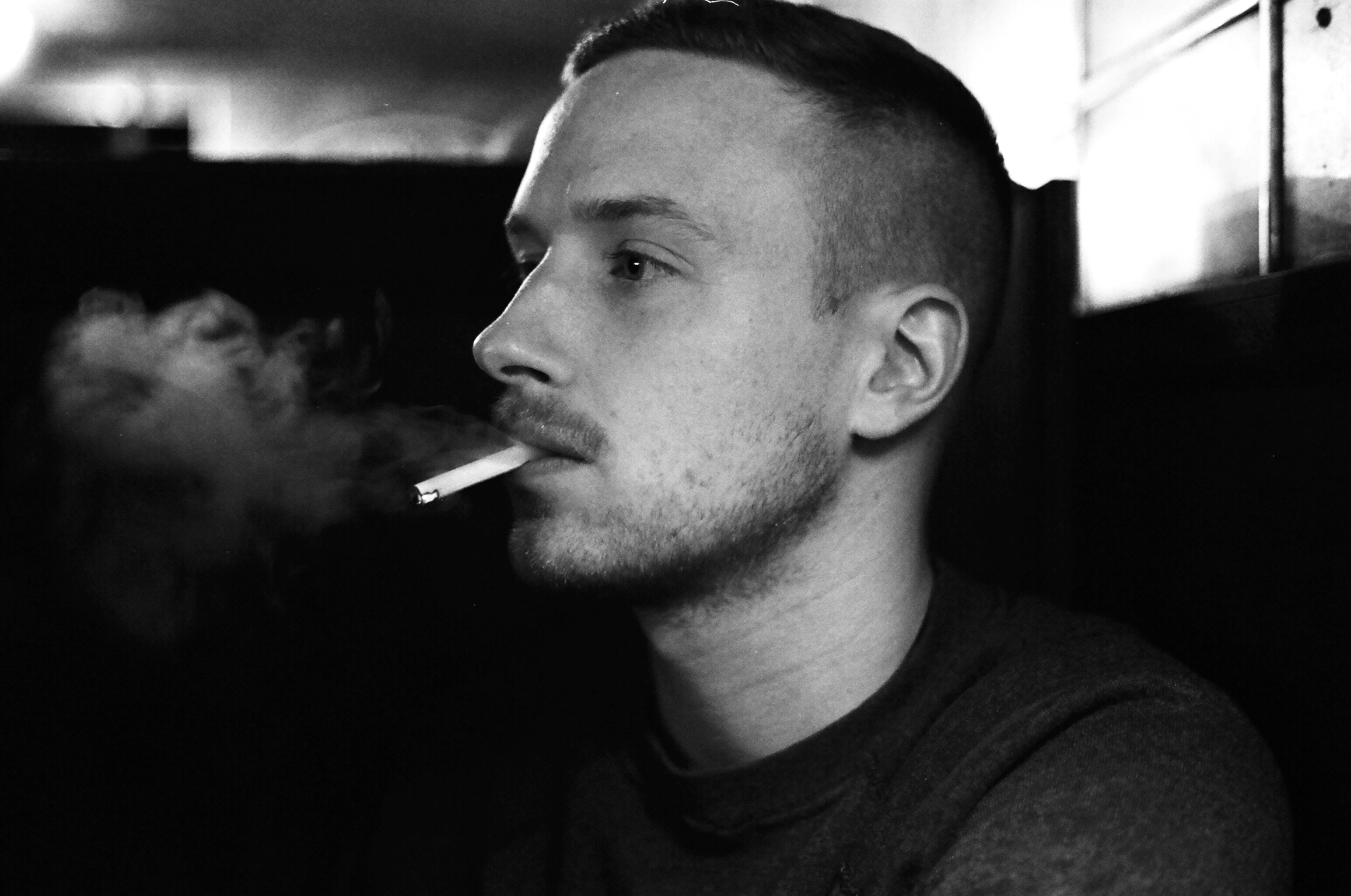
- Wise Blood c. 2015.

Background information
- Birth name: Chris Laufman
- Also known as: C. Moore Laufman
- Genres: Pop, electronic, alternative, gospel
- Years active: 2010–present
- Labels: Dovecote Records, Future Gods, Cretin's Club
- Website: Chris Laufman

Wise Blood is the stage name of producer, performer, and songwriter Chris Laufman. He has released two albums, three EP's, and a mixtape. His work is largely sample-based and electronic.

== Career ==
=== 2010–2013: early career and Id ===
Chris Laufman released his first project as Wise Blood, +, in 2010. A video for the song "B.I.G. E.G.O." premiered later that year featuring Daphne Guinness. Following the reception of his debut EP he was the subject of a Pitchfork profile which focused on his unique approach to songwriting. Laufman would subsequently release another Wise Blood EP, These Wings, in 2011 along with the single "Loud Mouths". In support of the release he performed at SXSW and played in-studio at BBC Radio 1. He gained attention for his energetic and aggressive live shows, as well as for his conflicted relationship with Catholicism. His music was particularly noted for its incorporation of samples, a process which he further expanded on in an interview with The New York Times in 2011. Laufman contributed a cover of the song "Someday" by the Strokes to Stereogum's "STROKED: A Tribute to Is This It".

In 2013 Wise Blood released his debut album Id. A trailer for the album was released featuring Dog the Bounty Hunter. Its first single, "Rat", premiered on Pitchfork. Speaking to Fact Laufman revealed that his tumultuous personal life and struggle with conceptualizing the album had contributed to its delay. In an MTV profile he expanded on his personal issues as well as revealed the different influences that inspired the record including John Waters. In their review of the album Consequence of Sound noted its similarities to Animal Collective and declared that "Laufman's genre collaging and quirky point of view make Id a compelling listen".

=== 2013–present: songwriting, production, and Greatest Hits ===
Following the release of Id Laufman's output consisted primarily of songwriting and production. He is credited as a contributing songwriter to Partynextdoor's eponymous self-titled debut EP Partynextdoor for the song "Wild Bitches" which contains elements of the Wise Blood track "Loud Mouths". Laufman also began working with Pittsburgh drag queen The Moon Baby. In 2014 they released the song "Bae Sick" on Dazed. Their debut EP Urallpoor.us premiered on Vice-run music site Noisey. They have continued to work together on subsequent releases.

In 2014, Wise Blood also released a conceptual mixtape titled Get 'Em using samples that were not able to be cleared for his debut album Id. Laufman explained the inspiration for the release and artistic process he took in creating the mixtape to The Fader as such; "'I wanted to do it after I watched my cousin download a movie on an iPad, watch it on T.V. then record some of the movie for a Vine", he says, "I like that the original material is literally traveling from device to device and then ending up back where it started but now it has some fucking mileage on it'". A video for the track "Helter Shelter" from the mixtape was released the previous year.

In 2019, Laufman released the album Greatest Hits under his own name. He revealed that the album was a collection of material from the past 7 years that dealt with his struggle with mental health and substance abuse issues that he had recently been addressing for the first time in his life. In his review of the album, Randall Colburn of The A.V. Club noted that it "veers—often wildly—between straightforward if decidedly off-kilter, pop ("Graceland", "When You Need Somebody") and tactile mood pieces that swallow Laufman whole in a maelstrom of delicately arranged samples ("Dope Swinger", "Soak Up the Sun")."

In 2022, Laufman released the EP Strain at a Gnat under the name C. Moore Laufman.

== Discography ==
=== Studio albums ===
- Greatest Hits (Future Gods 2019)
- Id (Dovecote Records 2012)

=== EPs ===
- Strain at a Gnat (Cretin's Club 2022)
- Urallpoor.us (with The Moon Baby) (Future Gods 2014)
- These Wings (Dovecote Records 2011)
- + (self-released 2010)

=== Mixtapes ===
- Get 'Em (self-released 2014)

=== Singles ===
- "Rat" (2012)
- "Loud Mouths" (2011)
- "Solo (4 Claire) / "Rot My Brain Away" (2010)
- "Alarm" (?)
