= Back into the Woods =

Studio album by Ed Harcourt
- Released: 2013
- Recorded: Abbey Road, London, UK
- Genre: British rock, chamber pop
- Length: 36:12
- Language: English
- Label: Piano Wolf Records

Ed Harcourt chronology
Lustre (2010)	Back into the Woods (2013)	Time of Dust (2014)

Back into the Woods is the sixth studio album by British singer-songwriter Ed Harcourt, released in 2013 in the UK. The album was written over the course of a month after Harcourt completed recording Lustre. The album was recorded in Abbey Road Studios during a single six-hour-long session on April 26, 2007.

The album's nine tracks feature Harcourt performing on piano with little or no accompanying instrumentation. The album was positively reviewed by music critics.

== Track listing ==
1. "The Cusp & the Wane"
2. "Hey Little Bruiser"
3. "Wandering Eye"
4. "Murmur in My Heart"
5. "Back into the Woods"
6. "Brothers & Sisters"
7. "The Pretty Girls"
8. "Last Will & Testament"
9. "The Man That Time Forgot"
