= Songdreaming =

songdreaming

Studio album by Sam Lee
- Released: 15 March 2024
- Genre: Folk
- Length: 47:50
- Label: Cooking Vinyl

Sam Lee chronology
Old Wow (2020)	songdreaming (2024)

Professional ratings
Aggregate scores
Source	Rating
Metacritic	88/100
Review scores
Source	Rating
MusicOMH	4.5/5 stars
The Guardian	5/5 stars
Written in Music	5/5 stars
Financial Times	4/5 stars
Mojo	4/4 stars
Americana UK	9/10 stars

Songdreaming (stylised as songdreaming) is the fourth studio album by English musician Sam Lee. It was released in March 2024 under Cooking Vinyl. It features the recording debut of Trans Voices, a London-based transgender choir.

== Track listing ==
No.	Title	Length
1.	"Bushes and Briars"	4:31
2.	"Meeting Is a Pleasant Place"	5:05
3.	"McCrimmon"	6:26
4.	"Leaves of Life"	5:33
5.	"Green Mossy Banks"	4:42
6.	"Aye Walking Oh"	7:03
7.	"Dreams of the Returning"	5:30
8.	"Black Dog and Sheep Crook"	4:48
9.	"Sweet Girl McRee"	4:07
