= Racy, West Virginia =

Racy
- Unincorporated community
- Location within the state of West Virginia Racy (the United States)
- Coordinates: 39°8′19″N 81°14′16″W
- Country: United States
- State: West Virginia
- County: Ritchie
- Elevation: 659 ft (201 m)
- Time zone: UTC-5 (Eastern (EST))
  - Summer (DST): UTC-4 (EDT)
- GNIS ID: 1555432

Racy is an unincorporated community in Ritchie County, West Virginia, United States.
