= Hello Dave =

American rock band

Hello Dave is a classic rock band from Chicago, Illinois. They have released a total of six albums. Hello Dave was the debut album featuring songs such as "Melissa", "No Way", and "Gracie". 16 Tons was their next album featuring the songs "16 Tons" and "Fine Young Thing". The next album that Hello Dave released was titled West, which was designed as an album ideal for taking road trips. Songs on this album include "Golden", "Mountains", and "Biminy".

Hello Dave then released a live album named Wicked Revelry, featuring 9 live tracks. The album concludes with the studio version of their hot-sun single, "Summertime". The next album, Perfect Day, featured a mix of old ("Golden", "Melissa") and new singles such as "Colorado" and "Michigan". The most recent release is Chicago Twang. The band debuts a new sound—more twang and bluegrass—on such tracks as "Ona Mae", "Waterville", and "Chicago Twang". The band also has a Christmas album entitled A Hello Dave Christmas

== Background ==
Hello Dave was formed at Eastern Illinois University in the early 1990s by Mike Himebaugh. The band began playing small bars and frat parties on campus with members Himebaugh, Matt McDevitt (keyboards), Frank Gerage (guitar/bass) and Pat Wagner (drums). The group soon branched out to other campuses in Illinois along with a few shows in Chicago at the now legendary Otis'.

The members of Hello Dave changed over the years- Himebaugh the mainstay played and traveled hundreds of thousands of miles with Eli Becker (bass), Chris Clemente (bass), Mike Hall (guitar), Willis Potocki(bass), Blake Cox (bass), Steve Merchant (drums), Bryan Resendiz (drums), Tony Orant (keyboards and vocals)Allen Wetzel (bass), and current members- Mike Magoo McGohan (guitar), Marty Williamson (guitar), Peter Bauschke (drums) and Matt Longbons (bass). The band criss crossed the country many times and played shows with bands including- Big Head Todd and the Monsters, Blues Traveler, Train, Keith Urban, Tim McGraw, OAR, Pat Green, Robert Earl Keen, The Doobie Brothers, REO Speedwagon, Lynyrd Skynyrd, Sister Hazel, Big and Rich, Lady Antebellum and the list goes on.

Hello Dave has worked with Producer Don Gehman (Mellencamp, Hootie, Grateful Dead) and engineer Mark Dearnley (AC/DC, McCartney, Petty etc. etc. etc.). Recently HD traveled to Nashville to work with producer Wyatt Easterling and engineer Mark Capps (three time grammy winner).

Throughout the decade of 2000 the band traveled the world doing shows for the US Military- from Japan to Alaska, Iraq to Korea, Saudi Arabia to Hawaii and Europe. Nearly once every year they toured for a week to 6 weeks for the men and women of America's Armed Forces.

=== "Chicago Twang" ===
Himebaugh describes the band's sound as Chicago Twang (a phrase that's been a part of the Chicago music scene since the 1920s) - "not quite country and not quite rock and roll"- and wrote a song by the same name describing the exploits of the band on its journey as a mainstay on the music scene. Chicago Twang became the Title Track to HD's 2009 release- Chicago Twang (Mountain Records).

== Discography ==
- Hello Dave (1993) (self titled cd)
- A Hello Dave Christmas (1994)
  - Proceeds from this CD benefited Camp Heartland, a camping program for children with HIV
- West (1995)
- 16 Tons (1998)
- Wicked Revelry (2000)
- Perfect Day (2004)
- Golden (EP) (2008)
- Chicago Twang (2009)
- Things People Say (EP) (2010)
