= Mason Proper =

American rock band

- Mason Proper playing live at the Ann Arbor Art Fairs in July 2006.

Background information
- Origin: Alpena, Michigan
- Genres: Alternative rock, indie rock
- Years active: 2004–present
- Labels: Dovecote Records, Secret Tunnel Group, Mang Chung
- Members: Jonathan Visger; Brian Konicek; Zac Fineberg; Garrett Jones
- Past members: Matt Thompson; Jesse Parsons; Pat Stafford; Matt Davis; Victor Kahn
- Website: Official website

Mason Proper was an American rock band formed in Alpena, Michigan, in 2004. The band consisted of Jonathan Visger (singer), Matt Thompson (keyboard player), Zac Fineberg (bass guitarist), Brian Konicek (guitarist) and Garrett Jones (drummer).

== History ==
The band was formed in Alpena in 2004 and recorded extensively throughout the year. On 17 January 2006, they released There Is A Moth In Your Chest on their own Mang Chung label. Cover art was provided by Aaron Burtch, the drummer of Grandaddy.

In 2006, the group focused on promoting their first album, touring across the country and recording sessions. In September, the band signed with the New York-based Dovecote Records, and the self-released version of their album immediately went out of print. The band released a re-mixed, re-mastered, and (in parts) re-recorded version of There Is A Moth In Your Chest in 2007 for Dovecote. The band toured through most of 2007 in support of Moth," afterwards releasing a four-song EP of new material entitled Shorthand'

The band released their second album, Olly Oxen Free, on September 23, 2008, on Dovecote Records.

== Discography ==
- There Is a Moth in Your Chest (Mang Chung) – January 17, 2006
- There Is a Moth in Your Chest (Dovecote) – March 13, 2007
- Short Hand EP – March 25, 2008
- Olly Oxen Free – September 23, 2008
