= Time of Dust =

Studio album by Ed Harcourt
- Released: 6 January 2014
- Genre: Rock
- Length: 28:14
- Label: CCCLX Music
- Producers: Ed Harcourt, Dave Izumi Lynch

Ed Harcourt chronology
Back into the Woods (2013)	Time of Dust (2014)	Furnaces (2016)

Professional ratings
Aggregate scores
Source	Rating
Metacritic	76/100
Review scores
Source	Rating
AllMusic	3.5/5 stars

Time of Dust is a mini album by British musician Ed Harcourt. It was released in January 2014 under CCCLX Music.

== Track listing ==
No.	Title	Length
1.	"Come into My Dreamland"	4:35
2.	"In My Time of Dust"	4:09
3.	"The Saddest Orchestra (It Only Plays for You)"	4:34
4.	"We All Went Down with the Ship"	4:27
5.	"Parliament of Rooks"	5:25
6.	"Love Is a Minor Key"	5:04
