= The Dog and Everything =

- Genre: Rock
- Members: Dan Monahan, Augie Schmidt, Jimmy Dietzen, Tommy Constantino, Dillon Riley
- Past members: Shawn Davis (Former Drummer), Dan Hoye (Former Drummer), Rob K. (Former Drummer), James Mastrino (Former Drummer)
- Website: www.thedogandeverything.com

The Dog and Everything is a power pop rock band from Chicago, IL. They hailed from the same scene as bands such as Lucky Boys Confusion and The Plain White T's.

== History ==
The band was started by Dan Monahan and Augie Schmidt. The two recorded the band's first album, Bandshell with producer Jeff Murphy, formerly of The Shoes fame. The album sold nearly 10,000 copies and the single, "Hey Luv" maintained steady radio play for several months in Chicago and other US markets. The songs "Hey Luv" and "Superglue" were licensed for use on MTV and were used in the shows The Real World and Undressed. After the album was out, they added drummer Shawn Davis to the band, and several months later, Jimmy Dietzen was brought in for guitar and backup vocals. In October 2002, the group was named "Chicago's Best Unsigned Band" in a radio contest sponsored by WZZN; "Hey Luv" became one of the station's most popular tunes in the fall and winter of 2002. The group toured for 2 years to support Bandshell, touring with Something Corporate, Riddlin' Kids and Lucky Boys Confusion across the US, and headlining multiple sold-out shows in major alternative venues in the Chicago area.

By 2004 tension between the band and Davis led to his departure. In 2004 the band re-entered the studio with producer Sean O'Keefe (Fall Out Boy, Hawthorne Heights) to make their second record, Sound Off. The addition of drummer Tommy Constantino rounded out the final lineup. The band toured for several years on Sound Off, and sold nearly 9,000 albums. They entered the studio with Jaret Reddick of Bowling for Soup to record 3 new songs, but these songs were never released by the band under "The Dog" name. Dietzen departed the band in February 2006. From here, The Dog and Everything continued to play as a trio under the original name, as well forming a new band called Last Fast Action with two additional members. Last Fast Action released a four-song EP, Season One, late in 2006.

The Dog and Everything re-united at the Double Door in Chicago, IL on December 31, 2010. This show was the final show in the "Songs From a Scene" concert series started by Lucky Boys Confusion. Original members Dan Monahan and Augie Schmidt played, however guitar player Jimmy Dietzen and drummer Tommy Constantino chose not to take part in the reunion. They were replaced by Dan Wade and Chris Insidioso from fellow Chicago band Treaty of Paris.

Dan and Augie went on to form a songwriting duo under the name "Audio Is King." In late 2015 Jimmy began releasing EPs and playing local Chicago shows with his new band, Sugar Free Guns.

Although the band stopped touring full time as a foursome in the late 2000’s, they reunited for a show with “Lucky Boys Confusion” on November 5, 2021 for a show at Bottom Lounge. On October 29, 2022, they joined their friends “Ludo” for Halludoween at the Pageant in St. Louis. Then, on May 6, 2023, they graced the stage of the famed venue “The Metro” in Chicago where lead singer Dan Monahan announced “they’re back.”

== Members ==
- Dan Monahan - Lead Vox
- Augie Schmidt - Guitar
- Jimmy Dietzen - Guitar, Vox
- Tommy Constantino - Drums
- Dillon Riley- Bass, Vox
- Shawn Davis (Former Drummer)
- Dan Hoye (Former Drummer)
- Rob K. (Former Drummer)
- James Mastrino (Former Drummer)

== Albums ==
- Bandshell (EEG Records, 2001)
- Sound Off (Emphasis Records, 2004)
