= Aberdeen City (band) =

American indie/alternative rock band

- Origin: Brighton, Boston, Massachusetts, United States
- Genres: Alternative rock, indie pop
- Years active: 2001–2009
- Label: Dovecote
- Past members: Ryan Heller; Chris McLaughlin; Rob McCaffrey; Brad Parker

Aberdeen City was a Boston-based indie/alternative rock band.

== Members ==
The members of the band were: Ryan Heller (guitar), Chris McLaughlin (guitar and vocals), Rob McCaffrey (drums), and Brad Parker (bass and vocals).

== History ==
=== Formation ===
They formed at Boston College, though McCaffrey, Heller and Parker all grew up in the same Chicago neighborhood.

=== The Freezing Atlantic ===
Their album, The Freezing Atlantic (Dovecote/Red Ink), was voted the number one new album by the WFNX Boston Phoenix Best Music Poll 2006. The album also won Local Album of the Year at the 2006 Boston Music Awards, pairing with the bands win for Best Local Rock Act. The band's first single, "God is Going To Get Sick of Me" took home the "Local Song of the Year" award the previous year before the album had been nationally released. Their moody second LP was produced by Nic Hard (The Church, The Bravery) and Steve Lillywhite (U2, Morrissey, Talking Heads). The band toured nationally with Electric Six, The Go! Team, Rasputina, We Are Scientists, Elefant, British Sea Power, The Hold Steady and more. The band was dropped from their recording contract with Sony after their tour.

The band took a break from writing their follow up to The Freezing Atlantic to collaborate on a handful of songs with Amanda Palmer (The Dresden Dolls). The five-some played three sold-out shows (Boston, Hoboken, NYC) and had plans to record some of the material in the fall of 2007, though this has not been released to date.

There were rumors in 2008 that the band was close to dissolving and Ryan Heller left the band in June 2008 to go to grad school in New York. Though the band never released a formal public statement declaring the end of their band, their official website has not been updated since 2009.

=== Disbandment ===
According to a website owned by Brad Parker, it states that the band disbanded in 2009.

== Discography ==
Studio albums

- 2003: We Learned By Watching (self-released)
- 2005: The Freezing Atlantic (Dovecote) reissued in 2006 on Red Ink / Columbia)
