= Elephant's Graveyard =

Compilation album by Ed Harcourt
- Released: 8 August 2005
- Studios: Maplewood Studios, Ridge Farm Studios, Real World Studios, Aerosol Grey Machine Studios, Atlantis Studios
- Genre: British rock
- Length: Promo CD1: 66:50; Promo CD2: 53:54
- Labels: Heavenly Records, Astralwerks Records
- Producers: Jari Haapalainen, Hadrian Garrard, Ed Harcourt, Gil Norton, Tim Holmes, Tchad Blake

Ed Harcourt chronology
Strangers (2004)	Elephant's Graveyard (2005)	The Beautiful Lie (2006)

Elephant's Graveyard is a special collection of B-sides and rarities from singer-songwriter Ed Harcourt. The collection was made available as a digital download only in the UK, and as a hard-to-find promo only 2-CD set in the US (released by Astralwerks Records). The collection spans roughly 5 years of music, some of which had been previously unreleased.

Ed also posted a track-by-track discussion of the collection on his website.

== Track listing ==
All songs written by Ed Harcourt, except where noted.

=== Part 1 ===
1. "The Unlucky One" – 4:46
2. "T Bone Tombstone" – 3:14
3. "Here Be Monsters" – 4:43
4. "I've Become Misguided" – 5:37
5. "When Americans Come to London" – 5:05
6. "Alligator Boy" – 5:29
7. "Weary and Bleary Eyed" – 5:27
8. "Last of the Troubadors" – 4:22
9. "Little Silver Bullet" – 3:06
10. "Sleepyhead" – 3:55
11. "Coal Black Heart" – 4:54
12. "Blackwoods Back Home" – 5:12
13. "Still I Dream of It" (Brian Wilson) – 5:24
14. "The Ghosts Parade" – 5:36

=== Part 2 ===
1. "Angels on Your Body" – 4:13
2. "The Hammer and the Nail" – 5:18
3. "She Put a Curse on Me (Parts I & II)" – 6:07
4. "The Iceman Cometh" – 4:29
5. "Asleep at the Helm" – 3:50
6. "Sugarbomb" – 3:12
7. "Paid to Get Drunk" – 3:45
8. "Atlantic City" (Bruce Springsteen) – 3:45
9. "Deathsexmarch" – 1:17
10. "Mysteriously" – 3:34
11. "Only Happy When You're High" – 4:21
12. "Breathe a Little Softer" – 4:56
13. "Every Night" – 2:53
14. "Epitaph" – 2:14

== Credits ==
Part 1:

- Track 1: previously unreleased
- Tracks 2–3: from "Something in My Eye" single (11 June 2001)
- Tracks 4–5: from "She Fell Into My Arms" single (10 September 2001)
- Tracks 6–9: from "Apple of My Eye" single (21 January 2002)
- Track 10: from a magazine compilation CD
- Tracks 11–12: from "All of Your Days Will Be Blessed" (3 February 2003)
- Tracks 13–14: from "Still I Dream of It" single (28 October 2002)
- Track 13: Brian Wilson cover

Part 2:

- Track 1: bonus track from the Japanese pressing of From Every Sphere
- Track 2: bonus track from the US pressing of From Every Sphere
- Tracks 3–5: previously unreleased
- Tracks 6–7: from "Watching the Sun Come Up" single (19 May 2003)
- Track 8: Bruce Springsteen cover
- Tracks 9–10: from "This One's for You" single (30 August 2004)
- Tracks 11–12: from "Born in the '70s" single (1 November 2004)
- Tracks 13–14: from "Loneliness" single (14 February 2005)
