= Tim Williams (folk musician) =

American singer-songwriter

- Born: November 5, 1979 (age 46)
- Genres: Folk, indie rock
- Instrument: Guitar
- Years active: 2002–present
- Labels: Modern Outsider
- Website: Tim-williams.net

Tim Williams (born November 5, 1979) is an American singer-songwriter folk musician, based in Los Angeles, California, United States. He has released two albums, two EPs and several singles on Dovecote Records and is signed with Modern Outsider Records as a part of the band Soft Swells.

== Biography ==
With roots in the Midwest, Williams' music career began in Boston, Massachusetts with a self-released EP Songs For the Commute. After one year in Boston, Williams moved to New York and immediately began writing and recording a second release while staying at the Hotel Chelsea. These sessions turned into his two subsequent albums, 8/18 Chelsea Sessions and Tales of Digression, which would soon after become the first two releases on the Dovecote Records label.

Williams supported these releases playing small clubs and venues in the US and UK. In 2004 he met London-based producer Dave Lynch during a showcase at the CMJ festival in New York City. Lynch offered to record Williams' next record if he ever found himself in the UK again. In November 2005, Williams moved in with friends in Eastbourne, England and began writing and recording with Lynch. The resulting album (When Work Is Done) marked Williams first release with national exposure. He embarked on multiple tours making stops at South By Southwest, CMJ, and the Sundance Film Festival. His video for "Novel" won MTV's weekly video contest The Freshman.

Williams' third studio album, Careful Love, should be approached with a few more personal facts in mind: he wrote it after open heart surgery, while in love, and displaced from Brooklyn to California. Careful Love was released on Dovecote Records.

== Discography ==
- Songs for the Commute (EP) (2002)
- "The Refrain" (2002)
- 8/18 Chelsea Sessions (2003)
- "Ami 7" (2003)
- Tales of Digression (2004)
- The Merchant Heart (EP) (2006)
- When Work Is Done (2007)
- "When Work Is Done" (2008)
- Careful Love (2009)
