= Here Be Monsters (Ed Harcourt album) =

Studio album by Ed Harcourt
- Released: 25 June 2001
- Studios: Ridge Farm Studios, Capel, Surrey, England
- Genre: British rock chamber pop
- Length: 52:08
- Label: Heavenly
- Producers: Tim Holmes, Gil Norton, Ed Harcourt

Ed Harcourt chronology
Maplewood (2000)	Here Be Monsters (2001)	From Every Sphere (2003)

Singles from Here Be Monsters
- 1. "Something in My Eye" Released: 11 June 2001; 2. "She Fell Into My Arms" Released: 10 September 2001; 3. "Apple of My Eye" Released: 21 January 2002; 4. "Shanghai" Released: 8 April 2002 (promo only)

Here Be Monsters is the debut album by Ed Harcourt, released in 2001. It was nominated for the Mercury Music Prize in 2001. Tim Holmes, one-half of British dance music duo Death In Vegas, co-produced the album. The singles "Something in My Eye" and "Apple of My Eye" charted in the UK. The album reached 84 in the UK album chart.

== Singles ==
In the UK, there were four singles released:

- "Something in My Eye" (11 June 2001); CD, 7" vinyl
  - B-sides: "T Bone Tombstone" / "Here Be Monsters"
- "She Fell Into My Arms" (10 September 2001); CD, 7" vinyl
  - B-sides: "I've Become Misguided" (new version) / "When Americans Come to London"
- "Apple of My Eye" (21 January 2002); CD1, CD2, cassette
  - B-sides: "Alligator Boy" / "Weary and Bleary Eyed" / "Last of the Troubadors" / "Little Silver Bullet" / "Apple of My Eye" (video)
- "Shanghai" (8 April 2002) (This single was canceled and released as a promo single only.)

== Critical reception ==
Professional ratings
Review scores
Source	Rating
AllMusic	4/5 stars
Alternative Press	8/10
Drowned in Sound	9/10
Entertainment Weekly	B+
The Guardian	3/5 stars
NME	8/10
Pitchfork	4.0/10
Stereo & Video	4/5 stars
Uncut	4/5 stars

Q listed Here Be Monsters as one of the best 50 albums of 2001.

== Track listing ==
1. "Something in My Eye" – 3:41
2. "God Protect Your Soul" – 5:27
3. "She Fell into My Arms" – 3:49
4. "Those Crimson Tears" – 5:09
5. "Hanging with the Wrong Crowd" – 3:41
6. "Apple of My Eye" – 4:04
7. "Beneath the Heart of Darkness" – 7:19
8. "Wind Through the Trees" – 6:45
9. "Birds Fly Backwards" – 3:30
10. "Shanghai" – 3:49
11. "Like Only Lovers Can" – 4:54

== Personnel ==
- Ed Harcourt – vocals, piano, pump organ, acoustic guitar, electric guitar, Wurlitzer, vibes, saxophone, harmonica, bass, beatbox, backing vocals, sampling, synthesizer, drums, percussion, string arrangement
- Nick Yeatman – drums, percussion, backing vocals, hand clapping, loops
- Hadrian Garrard – trumpet, trombone, percussion, drums, backing vocals, hand clapping, radio static
- Arnulf Lindner – double bass, electric bass, fretless bass, bowed bass, backing vocals
- Leo Abrahams – electric guitar, 12-string guitar, fretless guitar, baritone guitar, omnichord, glockenspiel, mandolin, backing vocals, string arrangement
- Tim Holmes – loops, sequencing, samples
- Dave Fridmann – backing vocals
- Martin Kelly – backing vocals
- Simon Harris – backing vocals
- Chris Scard – hand clapping
- Gil Norton – hand clapping
- Sophie Sirota – viola, string arrangement
- Max Garrard – French horn
- Howard Gott – string arrangement, violin
- Ruth Gottlieb – violin
- Sarah Willson – cello
