= Ed Harcourt =

English singer-songwriter (born 1977)

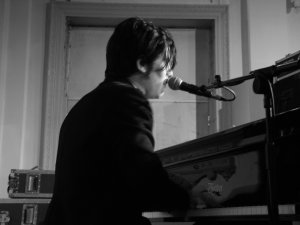
- Harcourt in 2005

Background information
- Born: Edward Henry Richard Harcourt-Smith; 14 August 1977 (age 49)
- Origin: Wimbledon, London, England
- Genres: Chamber pop, indie pop
- Occupations: Singer-songwriter, writer, record producer
- Instruments: Vocals, piano, guitar, bass guitar, drums
- Years active: 2000–present
- Labels: Piano Wolf Recordings; Astralwerks; Dovecote; Heavenly

Edward Henry Richard Harcourt-Smith (born 14 August 1977) is an English singer-songwriter. To date, he has released ten studio albums, two EPs, and thirteen singles. His debut album, Here Be Monsters, was nominated for the 2001 Mercury Prize. Since 2007, he has been writing for other artists, including Sophie Ellis-Bextor and Paloma Faith, and has performed with Marianne Faithfull and the Libertines. His music is influenced by Tom Waits, Nick Cave, and Jeff Buckley, among others.

== Career ==
Harcourt was born Edward Henry Richard Harcourt-Smith on 14 August 1977, in Wimbledon, London, England.^{[1]} The youngest of three, Harcourt is the son of Maj. Charles Harcourt-Smith of the Life Guards and also a former diplomat, and his wife Sabrina, an art historian. Ed began to study piano at the age of nine and achieved grade 8 when he was 17. He declined the offer to study music, citing "the idea of having to analyze, dissect and everything [of one piece of music] would completely destroy any enjoyment".

Before going solo, Harcourt played the bass and keyboards for Snug, a band formed at school in the mid-1990s by Harcourt, James Deane, Ed Groves and Johnny Lewsley. The band recorded two albums and a handful of singles together before dissolving.

In 2000, Harcourt recorded his debut mini-album Maplewood EP straight to a 4-track recorder at Wootton Manor. After signing with Heavenly Records and releasing Maplewood in November 2000, Harcourt recorded his debut studio album Here Be Monsters with producers Gil Norton and Tim Holmes. The album was released in June 2001, and charted on the UK Albums Chart at No. 84. One month after its release, the album was nominated for the 2001 Mercury Prize. He later described the period as "very strange for me, I was naive, I knew nothing. I was used to making music in my room, so it felt very odd being on stage". In the US he signed with Capitol Records.

Following the non-album single release of the Brian Wilson cover "Still I Dream of It" in October 2002, Harcourt recorded and released his second album From Every Sphere in February 2003. The album became his highest-charting release in the UK, peaking at No. 39. The album also performed moderately well across Europe, peaking at No. 6 in Sweden, No. 25 in Norway, and No. 103 in France. From Every Sphere also yielded his highest-charting single to date, "All of Your Days Will Be Blessed", at No. 35. A second single, "Watching the Sun Come Up", was less successful, peaking at No. 79. After a steady schedule of tour dates in the UK, Harcourt's third album, Strangers, was released in September 2004. The album peaked at No. 57 in the UK and at No. 7 in Sweden, and produced the singles "This One's for You", "Born in the '70s", and "Loneliness."

Through 2005 Harcourt played some live dates with a side-project he called Wild Boar. In August 2005, the B-sides and rarities compilation Elephant's Graveyard was released as a digital download. In the same year he performed at the annual Meltdown Festival in London, supporting the Brian Jonestown Massacre and joining the curator Patti Smith for a rendition of "Pissing in a River". He was also part of the ensemble that performed the William Blake inspired Songs of Innocence.

Harcourt's fourth album The Beautiful Lie was released in June 2006 to generally favourable reviews, with AllMusic describing the album as "an invigorating and frequently gorgeous affair, essential for old fans and a good place to start for newcomers." The album was not as successful on the UK charts, peaking at No. 97. The Beautiful Lie was co-produced with Jari Haapalainen, and features contributions from The Magic Numbers, who sing backing vocals on "Revolution in the Heart"; Graham Coxon, who plays guitar on first single "Visit from the Dead Dog"; and Ed's wife Gita, who plays violin throughout and sings duet vocals on the track "Braille". He later described the release as "the bête noire of the albums".

Harcourt recorded several tracks with the French jazz trumpeter Erik Truffaz for the album Arkhangelsk, released in early 2007. He also performed live with Truffaz's group to promote the album. In October 2007, Harcourt released the compilation album Until Tomorrow Then: The Best of Ed Harcourt, collecting material from the first seven years of his recording career. With the release he completed his obligations with Heavenly/EMI and the contract was not renewed. As a consequence he stepped away from his solo career as he was "really bored and sick of myself and my music. I had tried for seven years to make it and break into the mainstream and it didn't happen".

In 2009, Harcourt signed with Dovecote Records in the United States to release The Beautiful Lie stateside, as well as his new EP Russian Roulette which appeared in May of that year. Also in 2009, Harcourt composed the original music for the soundtrack to the Donnie Darko sequel S. Darko. In early 2010, he wrote a song called "Isabel" for the SOS Children's Villages Emergency Relief Fund in Haiti.

Harcourt's fifth studio album Lustre was released on 14 June 2010, the first on his record label Piano Wolf Recordings. The album was produced by Ryan Hadlock at Bear Creek Studios.

In February 2013, Harcourt released the album Back into The Woods through CCCLX, the new label set-up by his manager Sean Adams. It was recorded during a one-day session helmed by Pete Hutchings at the Abbey Road Studios and featured his wife Gita on violin and Arnulf Lindner (cello). The release was supported by a headlining tour around England.

In January 2014, Harcourt released Time of Dust, a six-track mini-album on CCCLX. It includes the duet "Come Into My Dreamland" with Kathryn Williams. In 2015 he performed the 17-minute piece "Restoration" for the Belgian charity MusicFund. It was inspired by the BBC documentary Our World: Saving Gaza's grand piano broadcast that featured the work of the charity.

In August 2016, Harcourt released his seventh solo album Furnaces, produced by Flood. It was described as "gently apocalyptic pop with billowy choruses".

=== Live ===
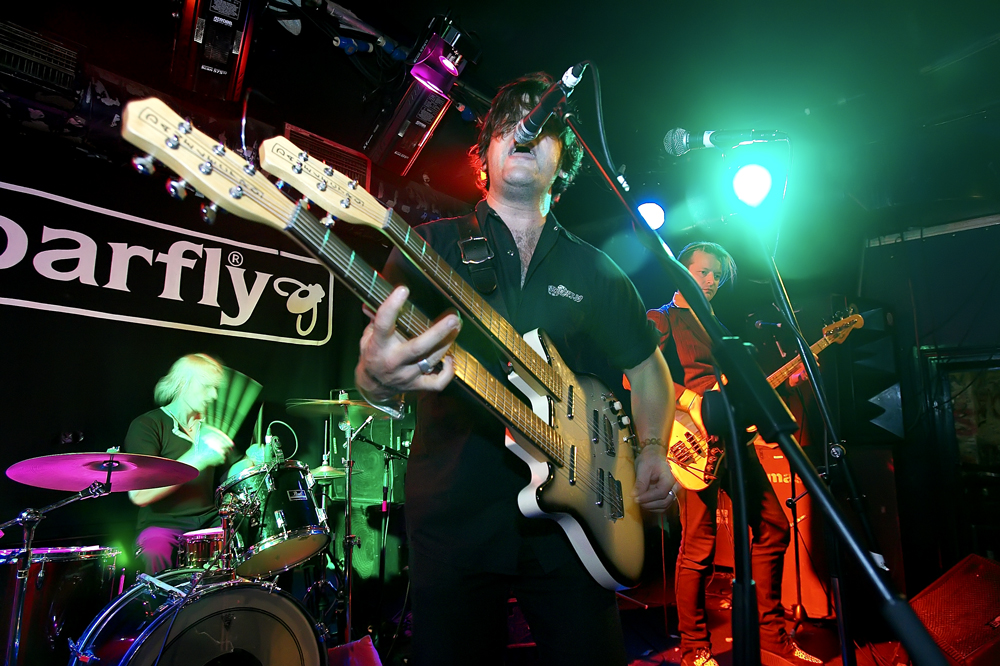
Ed Harcourt with Wild Boar at The Barfly Club, Camden, August 2005.

Harcourt performed with Patti Smith and her band as well as Marianne Faithfull during the 2005 Meltdown Festival and her 2014 tour.

Harcourt opened for The Gutter Twins on their European tour in 2008, as well as joining the group on stage to play guitar on some songs, most notably on their appearance on Later... with Jools Holland, performing the single "Idle Hands.". In December 2013 Harcourt made a guest appearance with Laura Jansen at Bush Hall, London to sing "A Call to Arms".

On 26 June 2015, The Libertines were the surprise special guests on the Pyramid stage at Glastonbury Festival 2015, with Harcourt joining them on stage to play piano. He also joined the band on stage during the Reading and Leeds Festivals Headline slots in August 2015.

In the summer of 2017, while on tour supporting The Afghan Whigs, Harcourt played rhythm guitar on stage with the band at their concert at NorthSide Festival (Denmark) as well as performing an exclusive, solo mini-concert, at a nearby allotment garden.

On 22 October 2017, Harcourt played (as band leader) the whole Sgt. Pepper's Lonely Hearts Club Band album live at the Philharmonie de Paris for Arte TV show along with Carl Barât and Pete Doherty (The Libertines), Barrie Cadogan (Primal Scream), Danny Goffey and Gaz Coombes (Supergrass), Steve Mason and others.

== Songwriting ==
After the release of the Best Of collection Until Tomorrow Then in 2007, Harcourt changed career and became a songwriter for other acts. In 2008, he co-wrote the title track for the Paloma Faith album Do You Want The Truth Or Something Beautiful?, which reached #64 in the UK singles chart. In 2013 Harcourt worked with Sophie Ellis-Bextor on her fifth studio album Wanderlust, which Harcourt co-wrote and produced. He has written for and performed with Marianne Faithful on her Give My Love to London project in 2014. Other artists include Jamie Cullum, James Bay and Lisa Marie Presley. In 2015, Harcourt provided vocals for the track "Villain" from the album 8:58, a project by Paul Hartnoll.

== Personal life ==
He is married to the singer and musician Gita Harcourt-Smith, née Langley, singer and songwriter in The Langley Sisters. Together, the couple have two children – a daughter, Roxy, and a son, Franklyn.

== References in popular culture ==
In the video game Silent Hill: Downpour, his song "Here Be Monsters" is played in the "Surprise" ending and "From Every Sphere" plays on WLMN FM radio. The song "Watching The Sun Come Up" also plays in the end credits of the video game Alan Wake's American Nightmare. The song "Born In The 70s" was also featured in the soundtrack for the show The Inbetweeners. In 2014, he wrote and performed the song "The Way That I Live" for the Burberry Christmas film From London with Love.

== Discography ==
- Here Be Monsters (25 June 2001)
- From Every Sphere (17 February 2003)
- Strangers (13 September 2004)
- The Beautiful Lie (5 June 2006)
- Lustre (14 June 2010)
- Back into the Woods (25 February 2013)
- Time of Dust (January 2014)
- Furnaces (August 2016)
- Beyond the End (November 2018)
- Monochrome to Colour (September 2020)
- El Magnifico (29 March 2024)
- Orphic (14 November 2025)
