= Maplewood (EP) =

Maplewood EP

EP by Ed Harcourt
- Released: 13 November 2000
- Recorded: Wootton Manor, Sussex, England
- Genre: British rock
- Length: 21:50
- Label: Heavenly
- Producer: Ed Harcourt

Ed Harcourt chronology
Maplewood EP (2000)	Here Be Monsters (2001)

Professional ratings
Review scores
Source	Rating
Allmusic	2/5 stars

Maplewood is an EP by Ed Harcourt. It was released in 2000. Harcourt recorded the album on a four-track in his grandma's Sussex house, and it was originally intended as a demo. Upon signing the artist to a record contract, Heavenly Records decided to make it his first solo release. The Guardian described it as "a bedroom-produced gem". Some of the songs were later re-recorded during the sessions for Here Be Monsters. The track "He's Building a Swamp" features Hadrian Garrard on trumpet. Harcourt would later describe the release as "the precocious youngest child record. The one everybody loved dearly and still thinks of very fondly, but it's still full of arrogance".

== Track listing ==
1. "Hanging With the Wrong Crowd" – 3:32
2. "I've Become Misguided" – 4:09
3. "Apple of My Eye" – 3:08
4. "Attaboy Go Spin a Yarn" – 4:03
5. "He's Building a Swamp" – 3:17
6. "Whistle of a Distant Train" – 3:41
