= The Fade in Time =

Studio album by Sam Lee
- Released: 15 March 2015
- Genre: Folk
- Length: 1:05:41
- Label: The Next Collective

Sam Lee chronology
Ground of Its Own (2012)	The Fade in Time (2015)	Old Wow (2020)

Professional ratings
Aggregate scores
Source	Rating
Metacritic	89/100
Review scores
Source	Rating
MusicOMH	4.5/5 stars
The Guardian	5/5 stars
PopMatters	8/10 stars
The Arts Desk	5/5 stars
Stereoboard	4/5 stars
Financial Times	4/5 stars
Songwriting Magazine	4/5 stars
Culturefly	3/5 stars
The Australian	4/5 stars
Northern Sky Magazine	4/5 stars

The Fade in Time is the second studio album by English musician Sam Lee. It was released in March 2015 under The Next Collective. In 2016, the album won the Songlines Music Awards in the category Europe.

== Track listing ==
No.	Title	Length
1.	"Jonny o' the Brine"	4:50
2.	"Bonny Bunch of Roses"	4:11
3.	"Blackbird"	4:12
4.	"Lord Gregory"	6:38
5.	"Over Yonders Hill"	6:23
6.	"Moorlough Maggie"	7:18
7.	"Phoenix Island"	4:50
8.	"The Moon Shone On My Bed Last Night"	6:06
9.	"Willie-O"	5:15
10.	"Airdog"	5:03
11.	"Lovely Molly"	5:19
12.	"Moss House"	5:36
