= From Every Sphere =

Studio album by Ed Harcourt
- Released: 17 February 2003
- Recorded: 2001–2002
- Studios: Real World, Bath, Somerset, England
- Genre: British rock Chamber pop
- Length: 56:43
- Label: Heavenly
- Producers: Tchad Blake, Ed Harcourt

Ed Harcourt chronology
Here Be Monsters (2001)	From Every Sphere (2003)	Strangers (2004)

Singles from From Every Sphere
- 1. "All of Your Days Will Be Blessed" Released: 3 February 2003; 2. "Watching the Sun Come Up" Released: 19 May 2003

Professional ratings
Aggregate scores
Source	Rating
Metacritic	77/100
Review scores
Source	Rating
AllMusic	4.5/5 stars
Alternative Press	5/5
Entertainment Weekly	B+
The Guardian	4/5 stars
Mojo	2/5 stars
NME	8/10
Pitchfork	5.8/10
Q	3/5 stars
Rolling Stone	3/5 stars
Uncut	4/5 stars

From Every Sphere is the second album by British singer-songwriter Ed Harcourt, released in 2003. Heavenly Records labelmate Jimi Goodwin of Doves plays tambourine on the first single "All of Your Days Will Be Blessed”, Harcourt's only UK Top 40 single to date.

== Track listing ==
1. "Bittersweetheart" – 4:30
2. "All of Your Days Will Be Blessed" – 3:43
3. "Ghost Writer" – 4:18
4. "The Birds Will Sing for Us" – 4:26
5. "Sister Reneé" – 4:44
6. "Undertaker Strut" – 3:41
7. "Bleed a River Deep" – 4:48
8. "Jetsetter" – 3:55
9. "Watching the Sun Come Up" – 5:47
10. "Fireflies Take Flight" – 4:35
11. "Metaphorically Yours" – 4:49
12. "From Every Sphere" – 7:27

Japan-only bonus tracks

13. "The Ghosts Parade" – 5:30
14. "Angels on Your Body" – 4:09

US-only bonus tracks

13. "The Hammer and the Nail" – 5:20
14. "Watching the Sun Come Up" (Enhanced Video)

== Personnel ==
=== Musicians ===
- Ed Harcourt – vocals, piano, electric guitar, pump organ, drums, bass, Clavinet, bells, percussion, harmonica, slide guitar, acoustic guitar, glockenspiel, fun machine, Korg synthesizer, Omnichord
- Arnulf Lindner – electric bass, bowed bass, double bass, percussion
- Nick Yeatman – drums, percussion
- Hadrian Garrard – trumpet, trombone, Reed organ, percussion
- Leo Abrahams – electric guitar, acoustic guitar, piano, triggered strings, Casio, loops, slide guitar, sampling, string arrangements, woodwind arrangements, orchestral arrangements
- Jimi Goodwin – tambourine
- Lisa Germano – backing vocals, viola
- Claire Lewis – programming
- Tchad Blake – percussion
- Dominic Kelly – oboe
- Rowland Sutherland – flute
- Chris Richards – clarinet
- Jo Cackett – bassoon
- Matt Gunner – French horn

=== Wrecking Crew Orchestra ===
- Violin – Howard Gott, Ruth Gottlieb, Lucy Wilkins, Natalia Bonner, Tim Myall, Jackie Norrie, Sally Herbert, Wendy De St Paer, Anna Morris, Alison Blunt, Gillon Cameron, Claire Raybould, Louise Peacock
- Viola – Sophie Sirota, Rob Spriggs, Vince Greene, Amanda Drummond, Naomi Fairhurst
- Cello – Sarah Willson, Oli Kraus, Andy Nice, Chris Mansell

== Singles ==
In the UK, there were two singles released:

- "All of Your Days Will Be Blessed" (3 February 2003); CD
  - B-sides: "Coal Black Heart" / "Blackwoods Back Home" / "All of Your Days Will Be Blessed" (video)
- "Watching the Sun Come Up" (19 May 2003); CD, Australian Tour EP CD
  - B-sides: "Sugarbomb" / "Paid to Get Drunk" / "Still I Dream of It" (Australian Tour EP only) / "Watching the Sun Come Up" (video)
