= Dovecote Records =

New York based record label

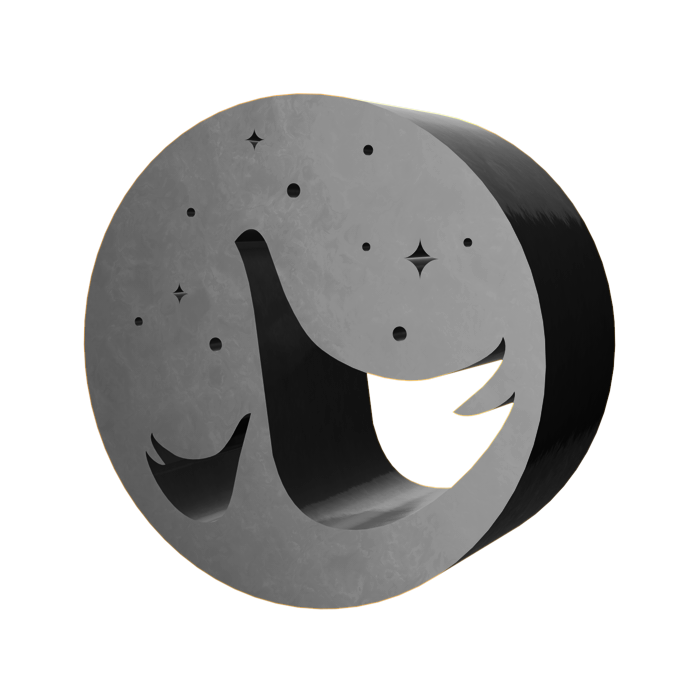
- Founded: 2003
- Founder: Carter Matschullat
- Defunct: 2014
- Distributor: Redeye Distribution
- Country of origin: United States
- Official website: dovecoterecords.com

Dovecote Records was a New York–based independent record label. It was run by its founder, Carter Matschullat, and was distributed by Redeye Distribution in the US.

== Artists and projects ==
Dovecote's roster included Wise Blood, SSION, Hooray for Earth, Supreme Cuts, Ski Lodge, Jonquil, Wunder Wunder, The Futureheads, Ed Harcourt, Mason Proper, Tim Williams, Trevor Giuliani, Cast Spells, Bad Veins, Blamma! Blamma! and Aberdeen City. In 2011 Dovecote Records held a SXSW showcase featuring performances by Wise Blood, Hooray for Earth, Dominique Young Unique, Baths, Trash Talk, and Big Freedia. In 2012 Dovecote released a photo book with hardcore band Trash Talk that included a 7" single. Dovecote's final release was Racy by Hooray for Earth in 2014.

== Releases ==
The following albums, EPs, and singles were released on Dovecote Records:

Cat No.	Artist	Title	Type
DCR 001	Tim Williams	818/The Chelsea Sessions	EP
DCR 002	Tim Williams	Tales of Digression	Album
DCR 003	Aberdeen City	The Freezing Atlantic	Album
DCR 004	Aberdeen City	God Is Going to Get Sick of Me	EP
DCR 005	Tim Williams	My Brooklyn/Ami	7"
DCR 006	Aberdeen City	God Is Going to Get Sick of Me	7"
DCR 007	Tim Williams	Merchant Heart	EP
DCR 008	Mason Proper	There Is a Moth in Your Chest	Album
DCR 009	Mason Proper	My My (Bad Fruit)	7"
DCR 0010	Tim Williams	When Work Is Done	Album
DCR 0012	Bad Veins	Falling Tide/The Lie	7"
DCR 0013	Blamma! Blamma!	The p. EP	12"
DCR 0014	Tim Williams	When Work Is Done	12" Picture Disc
DCR 0015	Mason Proper	There Is a Moth in Your Chest	LP
DCR 0016	Ed Harcourt	The Beautiful Lie	Album
DCR 0017	Mason Proper	Short Hand	EP
DCR 0018	Mason Proper	My My Bad Fruit	7"
DCR 0021	Mason Proper	Olly Oxen Free	Album
DCR 0022	Ed Harcourt	Russian Roulette	EP/USB
DCR 0023	Trevor Giuliani	Subcontrario In Stereo	Album
DCR 0024	Tim Williams	Murderous Air	Digital Single
DCR 0025	Harvey Sid Fisher	A Dovecote Holiday EP	Digital Single
DCR 0026	Tim Williams	I Hit Another Wall	Digital Single
DCR 0027	Tim Williams	Careful Love	Album
DCR 0028	Mason Proper	Mason Proper EP	EP
DCR 0029	Cast Spells	Bright Works and Baton	EP
DCR 0030	Hooray For Earth	Momo	EP
DCR 0031	The Futureheads	The Chaos	Album
DCR 0032	The Futureheads	Heartbeat b/w Struck Dumb	7"
DCR 0033	The Futureheads	The Chaos	LP
DCR 0034	Hooray for Earth	Momo	LP
DCR 0035	Jonquil	One Hundred Suns	EP
DCR 0036	Jonquil	One Hundred Suns	LP
DCR 0037	The Futureheads	Christmas Was Better in the ’80s	Digital Single
DCR 0038	Jonquil	Get Up	Radio Promo
DCR 0039	Hooray for Earth	True Loves	LP
DCR 0040	Wise Blood	These Wings	EP
DCR 0041	Wise Blood	Id	LP
DCR 0042	Supreme Cuts	Whispers In the Dark	LP
DCR 0043	SSION	Bent	LP
DCR 0044	Trash Talk	Book 2	7" SIngle
DCR 0045	Supreme Cuts	Divine Ecstasy	LP
DCR 0046	Wunder Wunder	Everything Infinite	LP
DCR 0047	Hooray for Earth	Racy	LP

== See also ==
- List of record labels
