= Ghostpoet discography =

Discography of British musician Ghostpoet

Ghostpoet albums discography
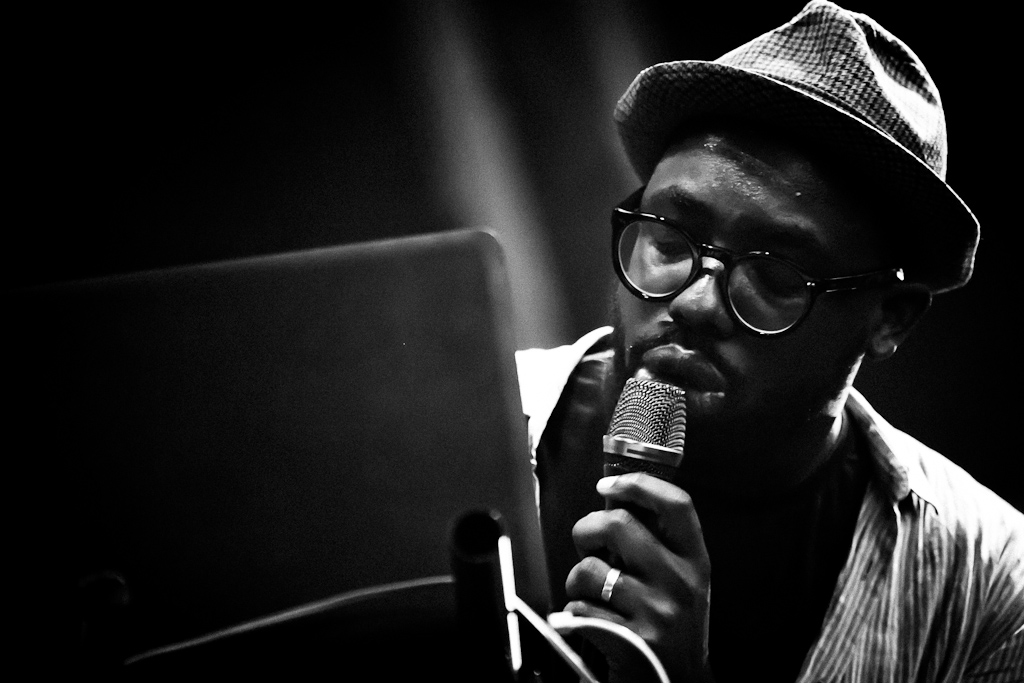
- Ghostpoet live at Musica Festival; Sydney, Australia (2011)
- Studio albums: 5
- EPs: 3
- Singles: 15
- Other appearances: 23

The discography of British musician, singer and songwriter Ghostpoet consists of 5 studio albums, 3 extended plays (EPs), 15 singles, and more than 20 guest appearances. The first recordings released in 2011 were on Brownswood, and all following recordings under his own name from 2013 to 2024 were on PIAS.

== Albums ==
Title	Album Details	Peak chart positions		
Title	Album Details	UK	SCT	BE
Peanut Butter Blues & Melancholy Jam	Released: 4 February 2011; Label: Brownswood Recordings	119		
Some Say I So I Say Light	Released: 6 May 2013; Label: Play It Again Sam	73		110
Shedding Skin	Released: 2 March 2015; Label: Play It Again Sam	52	75	75
Dark Days + Canapés	Released: 18 August 2017; Label: Play It Again Sam	39	42	84
I Grow Tired but Dare Not Fall Asleep	Released: 1 May 2020; Label: Play It Again Sam		16	

== Extended Plays ==
Title	EP Details
The Sound of Strangers	Released: 1 June 2010; Label: Self-released
Meltdown	Released: 4 June 2013; Label: Play It Again Sam
Am I the Change I Wish to See?	Released: 31 May 2024; Label: Modern Revenge Records

== Singles ==
Title	Single Details	Album	Peak chart positions
Title	Single Details	Album	UK
"Cash and Carry Me Home / Cash and Carry Me Home (feat. Kano)"	Released: January 2011; Label: Brownswood	Peanut Butter Blues & Melancholy Jam	
"Survive It" (feat. Fabiana Palladino)	Released: April 2011; Label: Brownswood	Peanut Butter Blues & Melancholy Jam	74
"Liiines"	Released: August 2011; Label: Brownswood	Peanut Butter Blues & Melancholy Jam	
"Meltdown" (feat. Woodpecker Wooliams)	Released: March 2013; Label: Play It Again Sam	Some Say I So I Say Light	100
"Cold Win"	Released: August 2013; Label: Play It Again Sam	Some Say I So I Say Light	
"Dial Tones"	Released: March 2014; Label: Play It Again Sam	Some Say I So I Say Light	
"Off Peak Dreams"	Released: February 2015; Label: Play It Again Sam	Shedding Skin	
"X Marks The Spot" (feat. Nadine Shah)	Released: May 2015; Label: Play It Again Sam	Shedding Skin	
"Sorry My Love, It's You Not Me" (feat. Lucy Rose)	Released: July 2015; Label: Play It Again Sam	Shedding Skin	
"Be Right Back, Moving House"	Released: December 2015; Label: Play It Again Sam	Shedding Skin	
"Immigrant Boogie"	Released: April 2017; Label: Play It Again Sam	Dark Days + Canapés	
"Freakshow"	Released: July 2017; Label: Play It Again Sam	Dark Days + Canapés	
"Wow Is Meee"	Released: December 2017; Label: Play It Again Sam	Dark Days + Canapés	
"Concrete Pony"	Released: January 2020; Label: Play It Again Sam	I Grow Tired but Dare Not Fall Asleep	
"Nowhere to Hide Now"	Released: May 2020; Label: Play It Again Sam	I Grow Tired but Dare Not Fall Asleep	

== Other appearances ==
Title	Year	Artist	Album	Label
"Had Enough"	2009	Micachu	Filthy Friends: Mix Tape Volume 1	Rough Trade Records
"Freefire" "Morning" "Love Blind"	2009	Micachu & Kwes	Kwesachu Mixtape Vol.1	Self-released
"Trumpalump" (Quiet Remix)	2011	DELS	Gob	Big Dada
"Tidy Nice and Neat"	2011	The Streets	Cyberspace and Reds	Self-released
"Fuck Tactics" (featuring Foe)	2011	Entrepreneurs	Fuck Tactics / Bubblegunk [Single]	Fear and Records
"The Look"	2011	Metronomy	The English Riviera	RCRD LBL
"Asthma Attack"	2011	CocknBullKid	Adulthood	Moshi Moshi Records
"Skinny Love {Ghostpoet Skinny Latte}"	2011	Birdy	Skinny Love {Ghostpoet Skinny Latte} [Non-album track]	Self-released
"Matilda"	2012	Alt-J	An Awesome Wave	Infectious Music
"HCHMWBIA"	2012	Micachu & Kwes	Kwesachu Vol. 2	Self-released
"Islands"	2012	Jakwob	The Prize	Boom Ting Recordings
"Season Change"	2013	Africa Express	Africa Express Presents: Maison des Jeunes	Honest Jon's/EMI/Transgressive Records
"Don't Let Your Mind Unravel, Safe Travels"	2014	Fofoulah	Fofoulah	Glitterbeat
"A Plateful of Liver"	2015	Ghostpoet	Body of Songs	Body of Songs
"Come Near Me"	2016	Massive Attack	The Spoils [Single]	Virgin Records
"Reckless"	2017	Lost Horizons	Ojalá	Bella Union
"Do What You Do"	2020	Do What You Do [Non-album track]	Barney Artist	Self-released
"Purpose"	2022	fyfe & Iskra Strings	Interiority	Benvolio Music
"Feel Again"	2022	Federico Albanese	Before and Now Seems Infinite	Mercury KX
"Earth, on a Good Day"	2022	The Vernon Spring	Earth, on a Good Day	Lima Lima Records
"Paradise Circus (Fallen Sun Version)"	2023	POST	Luther: The Fallen Sun	Netflix
"Mainstream"	2023	KwolleM	Melo	Rules the World Records
"The Slipstream"	2025	Tony Njoku	All Our Knives Are Always Sharp	Studio Njoku
