= Wild Winter =

Studio album by Smoke Fairies
- Released: December 2014
- Genre: Alternative; dream pop; folk rock; indie rock
- Length: 37:48
- Label: Full Time Hobby (2014)

Smoke Fairies chronology
Smoke Fairies (2014)	Wild Winter (2014)	Live at St Pancras Old Church (2015)

Alternative cover
- 10th anniversary release version

Singles from Wild Winter
- 1. "Christmas Without a Kiss" Released: 2014

Wild Winter is the fourth studio album by English duo Smoke Fairies, an alternative Winter/Christmas themed record, released in December 2014 on the Full Time Hobby label.

== Background ==
In an interview with NPR Music, the band said, "But it was interesting, because writing about the winter seemed to come pretty naturally to us, regardless of what was happening outside. There's so much to say about that time of year. It's an interesting combination — the way it was recorded, the time it was recorded (in the summer), and the subject matter. I think it's produced something quite strange out of all of that."

"Nothing to Divide Us"
"Nothing to Divide Us" was renamed "All up in the Air" on a 2015 re-release, but reverted to the original title in 2024.

In a review for The Guardian, Harriet Gibsone wrote, "...Smoke Fairies resist the chintz of traditional festive sonics, instead using spectral guitars and sprawling desert-rock soundscapes." David Smyth of The Standard wrote; "...Katherine Blamire and Jessica Davies have a different idea, wrapping dense guitars alongside spectral harmonies and Krautrock grooves for a collection that feels wintry but definitely not festive." Rhian Daly of NME, reflecting on the album's bittersweet themes wrote, "‘Three Kings’ rides a danceable bassline and ‘Bad Good’ sits awkwardly on Santa’s knee (”Have you been bad/Or have you been good?”) before the plaintive melody on ‘Nothing To Divide Us’ ends a record that, despite bleak inspiration, leaves a warm feeling."

Following the release, the band played a three-date UK tour in Bristol, Nottingham and London, showcasing the album.

The album was released in several formats, including CD, standard black vinyl and limited edition white vinyl (2015), as well as digital download.

In December 2024, to commemorate its 10th anniversary, Wild Winter was reissued on the band's Year Seven Record label with revised artwork. The band played two concerts, in Hastings and London, to celebrate the event. The reissue was available on CD and translucent glitter 'snow globe blizzard' vinyl.

Professional ratings
Aggregate scores
Source	Rating
Metacritic	76
Review scores
Source	Rating
AllMusic	3.5/5 stars
The Guardian	4/5 stars
NME	3.5/5 stars
The Standard	4/5 stars

== Track listing ==
Side A
No.	Title	Length
1.	"Christmas Without a Kiss"	3:18
2.	"Steal Softly Thru Snow"	2:39
3.	"3 Kings"	3:33
4.	"Give and Receive"	4:52
5.	"Circles in the Snow"	4:17

Side B
No.	Title	Length
1.	"Bad Good"	2:54
2.	"Wild Winter"	4:24
3.	"Snow Globe Blizzard"	3:14
4.	"So Much Wine"	3:59
5.	"Nothing to Divide Us / All Up in the Air"	4:38

== Personnel ==
All personnel credits adapted from Wild Winter album notes.

- All songs written by Smoke Fairies, except "Steal Softly Thru Snow" written by Don Van Vliet, Captain Beefheart and "So Much Wine" written by Brett and Rennie Sparks, The Handsome Family
- Bass guitar - Perry Neech
- Drums - Robert Wilks
- Guitar/viola – Neil Walsh
- Vocals, guitar, organ, synths – Jessica Davies
- Vocals, guitar, organ, piano, synths – Katherine Blamire
- Produced, engineered and mixed by Kristofer Harris
- Recorded at Squarehead Studio, Kent by Kristofer Harris
- Photography by Kamil Kostosz
- Published by Mute Song
