= Through Low Light and Trees =

Studio album by Smoke Fairies
- Released: 6 September 2010
- Genre: Blues, folk rock, indie rock
- Length: 64:20
- Label: V2

Smoke Fairies chronology
Ghosts (2010)	Through Low Light and Trees (2010)	Blood Speaks (2012)

Singles from Through Low Light and Trees
- 1. "Hotel Room" Released: 2010; 2. "Strange Moon Rising" Released: 24 January 2011; 3. "Storm Song" Released: 16 May 2011

Through Low Light and Trees is the debut studio album by English duo Smoke Fairies. It was released in September 2010 on V2 Records and worldwide a year later on the bands Year Seven Records label.

== Background ==
The album was recorded over a 10-day session at the Sawmills Studios in Cornwall.

In an interview for Slant Magazine, when asked about the bands musical influences on the album, Blamire replied, "A lot of our lyrics are quite concerned with looking back on the past in someway, looking back on how people change, and how they connect emotionally with their environment. And that’s kind of a historical perspective on life in a way, something I guess we’ve kind of picked up on. So yes, it’s about imagination really at the end of the day".

"Strange Moon Rising"
"Strange Moon Rising" reached no.17 in the Official UK Physical Singles chart.

The album title originates from lyrics in “Summer Fades", a song which reflects on "the nostalgia and excitement that comes with a new beginning", the band explained in an interview for The Line of Best Fit. The interview revealed details and meanings behind the tracks, which include, Devil in my Mind – "a dark song about getting lost and trapped in the city", Dragon – "dragons eating people" and Hotel Room – "light and momentary pleasure that might not last, but is good anyway".

In a review for NME, Laura Snapes concluded, "At times, it’s too lovely and woozy for its own good – but when the mood sours, as on standouts "Devin in my Mind" and "Erie Lackawanna", it’s really rather intoxicating stuff."

The album was released on CD with various bonus disc / EP versions and on black / limited addition clear vinyl. A limited edition box set with additional artwork and photographs was also available.

Through Low Light and Trees was reissued in 2021 on translucent green vinyl, to mark its 10th anniversary.

Professional ratings
Aggregate scores
Source	Rating
Metacritic	77/100
Review scores
Source	Rating
AllMusic	4/5 stars
musicOMH	3/5 stars
NME	7/10
PopMatters	8/10

== Track listing ==
CD 1
No.	Title	Length
1.	"Summer Fades"	4:11
2.	"Devil in My Mind"	4:46
3.	"Hotel Room"	4:11
4.	"Dragon"	2:37
5.	"Erie Lackawanna"	4:34
6.	"Strange Moon Rising"	3:25
7.	"Morning Blues"	3:39
8.	"Storm Song"	4:16
9.	"Blue Skies Fall"	3:04
10.	"Feeling Is Turning Blue"	3:51
11.	"After the Rain"	3:16

Bonus CD
No.	Title	Length
1.	"Dancing Light"	4:06
2.	"Storm Song" (alternate version)	3:48
3.	"Strange Moon Rising" (alternate version)	3:04
4.	"Requiem"	4:01
5.	"Devil in My Mind" (alternate version)	4:09
6.	"Human Concerns"	3:22

== Personnel ==
All personnel credits adapted from Through Low Light and Trees' sleeve notes.

- All songs written by Smoke Fairies
- Vocals, guitar – Jessica Davies
- Vocals, guitar, organ, piano – Katherine Blamire
- Viola – Neil Walsh
- Bass – Kristofer Harris
- Drums – Martin Dean
- Recorder – Jenny Blamire
- Produced, recorded and mixed by Head
- Recorded at Sawmills Studios, Cornwall
- Photography by Maria Mochnacz
