= Blood Speaks =

Studio album by Smoke Fairies
- Released: 21 March 2012
- Genre: Folk rock; indie rock
- Length: 43:49
- Label: V2

Smoke Fairies chronology
Through Low Light and Trees (2010)	Blood Speaks (2012)	Smoke Fairies (2014)

Singles from Blood Speaks
- 1. "The Three of Us" Released: 2012; 2. "Let Me Know" Released: 2012

Blood Speaks is the second studio album by English folk duo Smoke Fairies. It was released in Europe in March 2012 under V2 Records and in US in 2013 under Year Seven Records.

== Background ==
The album was inspired, in part, by being on the road as a touring band and the feeling of being lost in a vast amount of space. The album has a more confident feel to it versus Through Low Light and Trees, something that band explained in an interview with For Folk's Sake magazine, "From the outset of writing Blood Speaks we knew there was an audience wanting to hear it, so that gives you some assurance and confidence. It was important to us to make it feel like a step forwards, a change or development".

"The Three of Us"
"The Three of Us" peaked at no.13 in the Official UK Physical Singles chart.

In April 2012, the single "The Three of Us" peaked at #13 in the UK Official Physical Single Chart. Released as a CD single, it was also the title track of the "The Three of Us EP" which was available on 9" vinyl (V2 Records) or 2 x 7" vinyl (453 Records).

The track "Feel it Coming Near" was inspired by Laika, the first dog to orbit the Earth, explained the band in one of their Patreon posts. An artwork to illustrate the song was drawn by the band, and prints were available to fans.

In a review for Sea of Tranquility, Mark Johnson wrote, "Blood Speaks signals a new, heavier sound to the band's mix of folksy/blues acoustic interpretations. Although they open the disc with some similar vibes to their past albums, to slowly re-acquaint you, they will rock you later on the album".

Blood Speaks was released on CD, limited edition CD box set (with artwork, mini camera and postcards), black vinyl, limited edition red vinyl (2013), and digital download.

Professional ratings
Aggregate scores
Source	Rating
Metacritic	69/100
Review scores
Source	Rating
AllMusic	3.5/5 stars
Drowned in Sound	7/10
The Guardian	4/5 stars
Pitchfork Media	7.2/10
PopMatters	6/10
This Is Fake DIY	7/10

== Track listing ==
CD 1, Cat. # SF007CDX
No.	Title	Length
1.	"Let Me Know"	2:57
2.	"Awake"	4:20
3.	"The Three of Us"	4:53
4.	"Daylight"	3:56
5.	"Blood Speaks"	5:52
6.	"Take Me Down When You Go"	4:26
7.	"Feel It Coming Near"	5:00
8.	"Hideaway"	3:53
9.	"Version of the Future"	4:43
10.	"Film Reel"	3:49

Bonus CD
No.	Title	Length
1.	"Radio Clicks On"	3:31
2.	"Bells"	4.05
3.	"The Wireless"	3:39

== Chart performance ==
Blood Speaks reached the following chart positions:

Chart (2012)	Peak position
UK Record Store	12

== Personnel ==
All personnel credits adapted from Blood Speaks sleeve notes.

- All songs written by Smoke Fairies
- Vocals, guitar – Jessica Davies
- Vocals, guitar, organ, piano – Katherine Blamire
- Viola, banjo, omnichord – Neil Walsh
- Bass – Kristofer Harris
- Drums, timpani – Robert Wilks
- Produced, recorded, and mixed by Head, Eastcote Studios, West London.
- Published by Mute Song
- Art direction – StudioThomson
- Photography by Maria Mochnacz

For personnel and other information relating to the songs on the bonus CD, refer to 'The Three of Us EP'.
