= Dorothy (album) =

Studio album by Diagrams
- Released: 12 May 2017
- Length: 28:05
- Label: Bookshop
- Producer: Kristofer Harris, Mike Lindsay

Diagrams chronology
Chromatics (2015)	Dorothy (2017)

Professional ratings
Aggregate scores
Source	Rating
Metacritic	78/100
Review scores
Source	Rating
AllMusic	3.5/5 stars
The Independent	4/5 stars

Dorothy is the third studio album by English band Diagrams. It was released on 12 May, 2017 through Bookshop Records. The album was produced by Kristofer Harris and Mike Lindsay.

Sam Genders, the band's lead vocalist, set up a crowdfunding page on Indiegogo to release the album in collaboration with poet Dorothy Trogdon, raising £9,947.

== Track listing ==
No.	Title	Length
1.	"Under the Graphite Sky"	4:48
2.	"It's Only Light"	3:45
3.	"I Tell Myself"	3:42
4.	"Everything"	1:59
5.	"Motherboard"	3:00
6.	"Crimson Leaves"	2:47
7.	"Wild Grasses"	2:55
8.	"Winter River"	4:14
9.	"Under the Graphite Sky"	0:55
