= Smoke Fairies (album) =

Studio album by Smoke Fairies
- Released: 14 April 2014
- Genre: Alternative; dream pop; folk rock; indie rock
- Length: 44:59
- Label: Full Time Hobby

Smoke Fairies chronology
Blood Speaks (2012)	Smoke Fairies (2014)	Wild Winter (2014)

Singles from Smoke Fairies
- 1. "We've Seen Birds" Released: 2014; 2. "Eclipse Them All" Released: 2014; 3. "Shadow Inversions" Released: 2014

Smoke Fairies is the third studio album by English duo Smoke Fairies. It was released in April 2014 on the Full Time Hobby label.

== Background ==
The album was recorded at Squarehead Studio, owned by the band's long-term collaborator, Robert Wilks (drums and percussion).

In an interview with For Folk's Sake magazine, when asked about the inspiration behind the album, the band replied, "The main inspiration was how we were doubting ourselves, and what it means to have dedicated yourself to something which is so unreliable for so long. And also about our relationship – we’ve been friends since we were 11 and I think a lot of the songs are us writing about each other, the things you might not have been able to say but you’ll write a song about…"

"We've Seen Birds"
We've Seen Birds released in 2014.

In The Line of Best Fit's review of the album, Chris Jones writes, "Album opener “We’ve Seen Birds” gifts an instant lift, taking allegorical flight after a wink at “Sadness is a Blessing” in the opening bars. A celebration of motorway raptor-spotting during touring, Davies’ lyrics deftly combine self-deprecation with wide-eyed appreciation, alluding to the duo’s highs and history as much as to majestic birds of prey. These musings are coupled, and touching: “We’ve seen birds/Golden sunlight catching their wings/We’ve been here since we were kids/Did you think we could exist like this?” If Davies and bandmate Katherine Blamire had seen Smoke Fairies flash before them during that briefest of hiatuses, here is a catchy avowal that this music is a worthy end, “even if it means we’re screwing up the rest of our lives”.

Smoke Fairies was debuted at a one-off performance at Madame Jojo's in Soho, London, on 7 April 2014.

The album was made available on several formats, including a twin CD, standard black vinyl, limited edition blue vinyl, and a numbered deluxe box set.

Professional ratings
Aggregate scores
Source	Rating
Metacritic	71/100
Review scores
Source	Rating
AllMusic	4/5 stars
NME	4/5
The Line of Best Fit	8/10

== Track listing ==
Side A
No.	Title	Length
1.	"We've Seen Birds"	3:05
2.	"Eclipse Them All"	4:05
3.	"Shadow Inversions"	3:33
4.	"Hope Is Religion"	4:00
5.	"Waiting for Something to Begin"	5:20
6.	"Your Own Silent Movie"	3:25

Side B
No.	Title	Length
1.	"Misty Versions"	3:46
2.	"Drinks and Dancing"	2:38
3.	"Koto"	4:25
4.	"Want It Forever"	3:12
5.	"The Very Last Time"	3:45
6.	"Are You Crazy?"	3:45

== Chart performance ==
Smoke Fairies reached the following chart positions:

Chart (2014)	Peak position
UK Independent Album Breakers	2
UK Record Store Albums	8
UK Independent Albums	13
UK Physical Albums	50
UK Top 100 Albums	70

== Personnel ==
All personnel credits adapted from Smoke Fairies sleeve notes.

- All songs written by Smoke Fairies
- Bass guitar – James Simpson
- Bass guitar/viola – Neil Walsh
- Bass guitar/synth/percussion – Kristofer Harris
- Drums – Andy Newmark
- Drums/percussion/electric guitar – Robert Wilks
- Vocals, guitar – Jessica Davies
- Vocals, guitar, organ, piano – Katherine Blamire
- Recorded and produced by Kristofer Harris at Squarehead Studio, Kent
