= Singles (Smoke Fairies album) =

Compilation album by Smoke Fairies
- Released: 4 November 2022
- Length: 71:07
- Label: Year Seven Records

Smoke Fairies chronology
Darkness Brings the Wonders Home (2020)	Singles (2022)	Carried in Sound (2023)

Singles is the second compilation album by English duo Smoke Fairies. It was released in November 2022, on the band's Year Seven Records label.

== Background ==
Smoke Fairies described their compilation as "a sonic journey charting the evolution and artistic exploration of the Smoke Fairies sound".

Rough Trade Records mentioned the compilation:- "The band first entered a recording studio to record their debut single 'Living with Ghosts' in 2008. Since then, school friends Jessica Davies and Katherine Blamire have penned and recorded 18 singles as part of their incredible body of work.

In a review for KLOF Mag, Danny Neill writes, "This is a very welcome, super-quality compilation release; the Smoke Fairies, who were the first UK band to sign with Jack White’s Third Man Records label, have been releasing standalone singles alongside the cherry-picked single-worthy nuggets from their albums for over a decade now."

"Gastown"
"Gastown" also formed a part of Jack White's Blue Series.

While compiling the album, the band were reminded that singles "Gastown" and "Riversong" were originally recorded without a music video, something that they decided to resolve by releasing two new animated works by Sophie Graves at Lovely Little Animations.

To celebrate the release, on 7 November 2022, Smoke Fairies played a one night only, sell-out gig at Omeara, London.

The double-album was released on standard black and limited edition clear vinyl and deluxe edition CD.

== Track listing ==
Side A
No.	Title	Length
1.	"Living With Ghosts" (2008)	4:57
2.	"Frozen Heart" (2009)	4:29
3.	"Sunshine" (2009)	4:37
4.	"Gastown" (2009)	4:30
5.	"River Song" (2009)	4:19

Side B
No.	Title	Length
1.	"Hotel Room" (2010)	4:12
2.	"Strange Moon Rising" (2011)	3:25
3.	"Storm Song" (2011)	4:16
4.	"The Three of Us" (2012)	4:53
5.	"Let Me Know" (2012)	2:59

Side C
No.	Title	Length
1.	"Eclipse Them All" (2014)	4:05
2.	"We've Seen Birds" (2014)	3:05
3.	"Shadow Inversions" (2014)	3:34
4.	"Christmas Without a Kiss" (2015)	3:15

Side D
No.	Title	Length
1.	"Out of the Woods" (2019)	4:01
2.	"Disconnect" (2020)	3:26
3.	"Elevator" (2020)	3:17
4.	"No Matter How This Goes, Just Make Sure That You're Kind" (2020)	3:47

== Personnel ==
All personnel credits adapted from Singles sleeve notes.

- All songs written by Smoke Fairies
- Sides A & B published by BMG Rights Ltd, aside "The Three of Us" and "Let me Know" published by Mute Song
- Sides C & D published by Mute Song
- Original Logo – Daran Newman
- Sleeve design and artwork –Nayfe Slusjan

== Charts ==
Singles reached the following chart positions:

Chart (2022)	Peak position
UK Independent Album Breakers	2
UK Record Store	31
UK Physical Albums	47
UK Albums Sales	55

Chart (2022)	Peak position
UK Independent Albums (OCC)	21
Scottish Albums (OCC)	86
