= Davey Brozowski =

American drummer

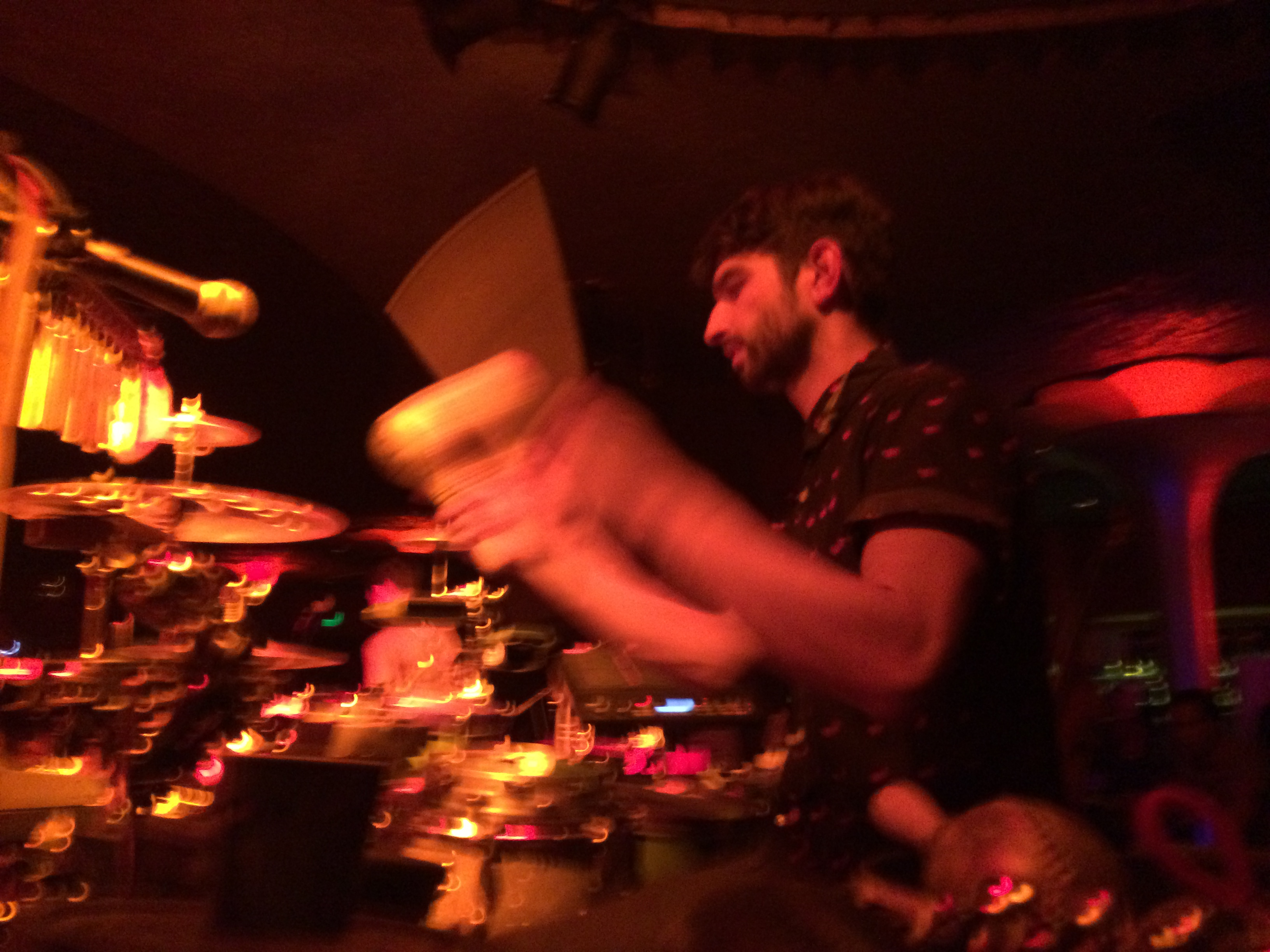

Davey Brozowski (born October 17, 1982) is an American drummer and percussionist from Seattle, WA. He has toured with Modest Mouse as their percussionist. Other acts include Cayucas, The Catheters, Black Whales, and Tall Birds. In 2010, Brozowski also toured with Broken Bells as their live percussionist alongside Brian Burton a.k.a. Dangermouse. He also played drums during the set whenever Burton would move to keyboards or guitar.

Brozowski provided drums and percussion on the studio album Darkness Brings the Wonders Home, released in 2020 by the UK duo Smoke Fairies.

Brozowski plays a sit down style cocktail kit with Modest Mouse that is modeled after a Rogers Parklane and custom made by C&C Drums.

His partner is Ra Ra Riot violinist Rebecca Zeller, with whom he shares two children.
