= John J. Presley =

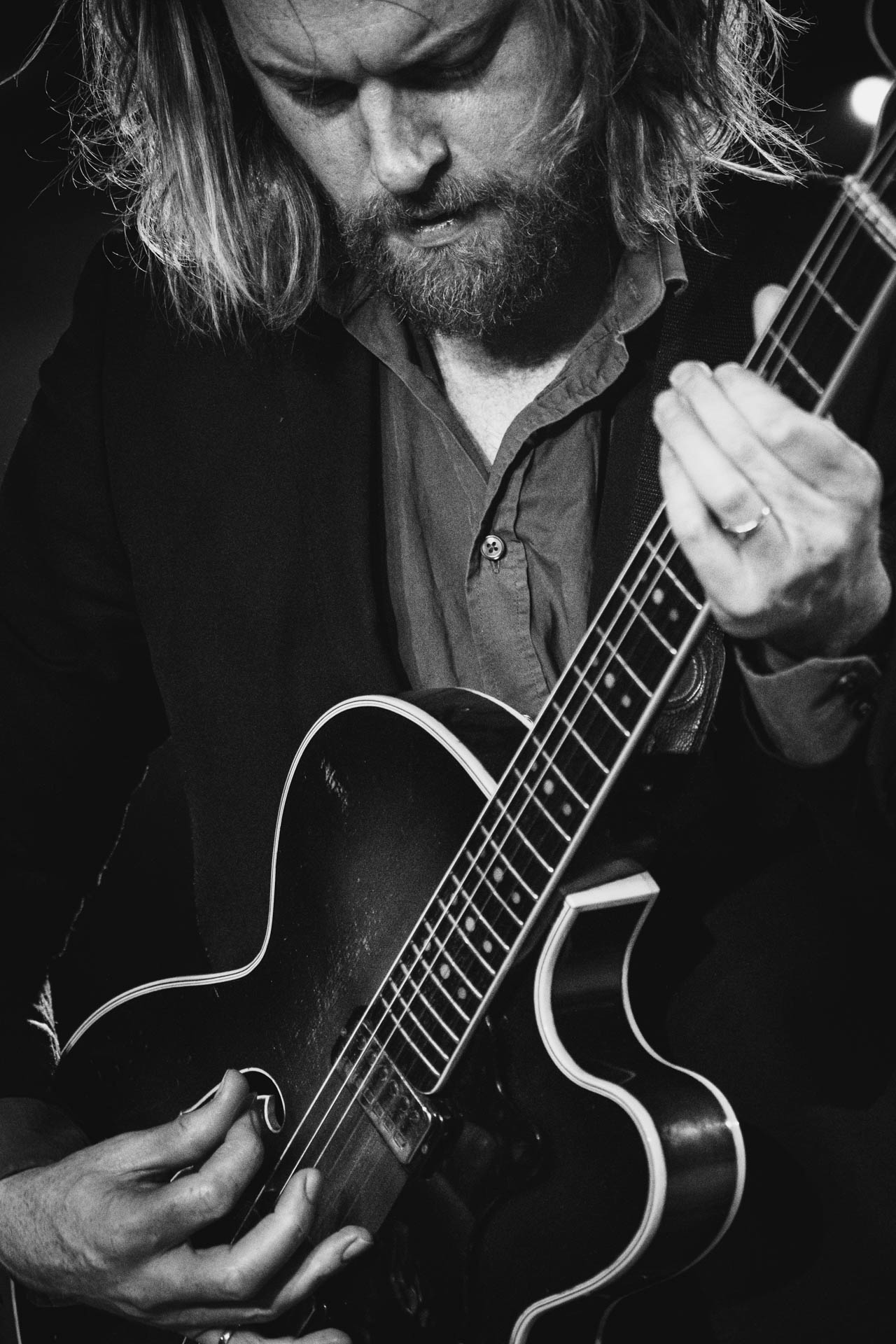

Background information
- Origin: Walsall, England
- Genres: Alternative, blues, blues rock
- Instruments: Vocals, guitar, bass, pedal steel, piano, keyboards, horns
- Years active: 2014–present
- Website: johnjpresley.com

John J. Presley is a British musician from Walsall, England.

== History ==
Having moved to London in 2013 Presley met Chris Denman of Radio X (formerly XFM) who recorded his debut single Left and the follow-up Honeybee released on Killing Moon Records. Support came from BBC Radio 1's Evening Show with Zane Lowe and from Phil Taggart, Alice Levine, John Kennedy, Radio X, Amazing Radio and Tom Robinson of BBC 6 Music leading Presley was invited to perform on the BBC Introducing Stage at Reading and Leeds Festival 2014 as well as Boardmasters, Live At Leeds, Truck, 2000 Trees and others that summer.

Presley supported The Jim Jones Revue throughout Europe and the UK culminating in the final show at the O2 Forum Kentish Town.

For his next release, the EP White Ink, Presley worked at Toe Rag Studios (White Stripes, The Kills) with Liam Watson. The recording was direct to tape and a studio that Presley said he always wanted to work in. White Ink was released on July 24, 2015, via Vital Music Group. It received a positive reaction prompting Laura Barton of The Guardian to write "..[his] music’s shape and sound do seem to sit midway between the blues of the Mississippi Delta and the beautiful enormity of my favourite post-rock geniuses. It’s a ferocious, belly-deep sound, but somehow tender with it."

During these years Presley had also met fellow musicians Duke Garwood, Ed Harcourt and Smoke Fairies for whom Presley has performed guitar and bass duties live including support roles for Seasick Steve, and Mark Lanegan.

Presley's debut album came in 2019, having signed publishing with BMG As The Night Draws In was released on his own label Nica Recordings and distributed by AWAL (Kobalt). In support of the album's release he toured the UK supporting Blood Red Shoes and Smoke Fairies.

== Discography ==
=== Albums ===
- As The Night Draws In (AWAL, BMG, Nica Recordings, 2019)
