= Live at St Pancras Old Church =

Live album by Smoke Fairies
- Released: 6 July 2015
- Genres: Alternative; blues; dream pop; folk rock; indie rock
- Length: 46:49
- Label: Year Seven Records

Smoke Fairies chronology
Wild Winter (2014)	Live at St Pancras Old Church (2015)	Darkness Brings the Wonders Home (2020)

Live at St Pancras Old Church is the first live album by English duo Smoke Fairies.

== Background ==
The album was recorded on 24 October 2013, at St Pancras Old Church, London and released in 2015. It features Rasputina, with whom Smoke Fairies were touring at the time, providing backing cellos on a number of songs.

In a quote for Waterloo Records, the band recalled the start of the tour; "With only a day to practice, we were all a little apprehensive as we unpacked our instruments and set up some amps in our kitchen, but after a few moments, as the strings, voices and guitars filled the room, we knew the shows ahead were going to turn out just fine. Melora and Daniel's cellos and Neil's viola provided new textures and direction to our old songs and it was a tour that left us very grateful for the opportunity to play with such talented friends, to attentive audiences in some spectacular, historical places".

"The Water Waits" - Live at St. Pancras Old Church
"The Water Waits" is also known as Sea Shanty I.

In a review for Echoes And Dust, Si Foster wrote, "It’s possibly strange to describe a recorded experience as intimate, but this album quietly holds the attention to a quite singular effect....the remote listener is left to curse themselves for not turning up in the first place but strengthen their resolve to leave the fridge behind and catch them at the next available opportunity".

The album was released on limited edition black vinyl, which quickly sold out.

== Track listing ==
Side A
No.	Title	Length
1.	"Fences"	3:25
2.	"The Water Waits"	4:37
3.	"Morning Light"	4:25
4.	"Living With Ghosts"	5:23
5.	"Troubles"	4:36

Side B
No.	Title	Length
1.	"Sunshine"	5:02
2.	"When You Grow Old"	3:17
3.	"We Had Lost Our Minds"	5:25
4.	"Summer Fades"	4:51
5.	"Blood Speaks"	5:46

== Personnel ==
All personnel credits adapted from the album's sleeve notes.

- All songs written by Smoke Fairies
- Guitars and vocals – Smoke Fairies
- Viola and bass – Neil Walsh
- Cellos – Melora Creager / Daniel DeJesus (Rasputina)
- Hurdy Gurdy – Leo Abrahams
- Cello arrangements – Daniel DeJesus
- Viola arrangements – Neil Walsh
- Mixed by Kristofer Harris at Square Head Studios
- Recorded by Paul Hurt - LX3.co.uk
- Live Sound by Tom Wheatley
- Mastered by Noel Summerville at 3345
- All tracks published by BMG Chrysalis, except "Blood Speaks" published by Mute Song
- Artwork – hand drawn by Smoke Fairies
- Artwork layout – Nought Design
