= The Corrections (band) =

English indie rock band (2001–2008)

- Origin: London / Bristol, England, United Kingdom
- Genres: Indie rock
- Years active: 2001–2008
- Label: EMI
- Past members: Guy Connelly; Matt Watson; Joe Winter; Matt Winter; Gavin Ellis; Jess Winter; Toby Cann
- Website: www.myspace.com/thecorrectionsband

The Corrections, originally known as The Fallout Trust, were an English indie rock band. As The Fallout Trust, they formed in Dalston, East London in 2001. The six-piece band produced two EPs and one album, In Case of the Flood, released by EMI in 2006. Their single "When We Are Gone" reached 73 in the UK Singles Chart in 2005, preceding the release of In Case of the Flood. The band reformed as a five-piece under the name The Corrections in 2007. They released one album on EMI, Repeat After Me in 2008, before disbanding.

== History ==
The Fallout Trust were formed around the crux of old school friends Guy Connelly and Joe Winter, inspired by a visit to Berlin and the music of Iggy Pop and David Bowie. The band was augmented by Winter's sibling, Matt and sister-in-law Jess, bassist Gavin Ellis and drummer Matt Watson. The band then moved to London, setting up home at 'Q Quarters', a warehouse which served as home, party venue and recording studio. In 2004 they were signed by at Large Recordings. They toured in support of Maxïmo Park, Morning Runner and Leaves, in addition to several headline tours, and performed at Glastonbury twice in the Guardian tent.

Two EPs were released, in 2004 and 2005. Their first single was "When We Are Gone" which reached number 73 in the UK upon its first release in June 2005. The second single, "Before the Light Goes", reached number 93 in November 2005. The album In Case of the Flood was released in 2006, with the coinciding single, "Washout", peaking at number 75. Nearly all of the band members are originally from Bristol and they are closely associated with venue the Louisiana.

== The Corrections ==
During their performance at the Louisiana on 6 October 2007, Joe Winter announced that the band would be changing their name to The Corrections. The Corrections were reborn as a 5-piece, with the same line-up as The Fallout Trust minus Jess Winter. 2008 singles "Barcode", "OCD" and "Full Stop" preceded their debut album. Repeat After Me, originally set for release on 7 July, was released in late 2008 on limited CD and iTunes.

The band maintained a tight link with artist/filmmaker 'Duckeye' who created much of their artwork and promo videos.

The Corrections parted company with EMI after the release of Repeat After Me, and the members went on to different projects. Guy Connelly formed the group Clock Opera. Matt Winter and Joe Winter continue to write, record and perform together as WINTER. Their first single, "The Sea Bites Back", was released in April 2014, and their album In The Dark will be released later in 2014. Gavin Ellis now records under the name Memory Maze.

== Band members ==
- Guy Connelly – guitar and vocals
- Gavin Ellis – bass guitar and vocals
- Matt Watson – drums
- Joe Winter – lead vocals
- Matt Winter – lead guitar

Earlier members:

- Jess Winter – violin and keyboards
- Toby Cann – bass guitar and "The Jump"

== Fallout Trust discography ==
=== EPs and singles ===
- "EP 1": "Them Or It" / "The Dog Hour" / "Bound with the Rope" / "The Price of Your Time" (At Large Recordings FUGIT 001 – 2004)
- "EP 2": "One Generation Wall" / "We Will Wake Up" / "The Watchman" / "TVM" (At Large Recordings FUG 04 – May 2005)
- "When We Are Gone" (At Large Recordings FUG 7 – 5 June) – UK number 75
- "Before The Light Goes" (At Large Recordings FUG 09 – October 2005)
- "Washout" (At Large Recordings FUG 014 – February 2006) – UK

=== Albums ===
- In Case of the Flood (At Large Recordings) – February 2006

== Corrections discography ==
=== Singles ===
- "Barcode" (EMI) – April 2008
- "OCD" (EMI – download only) – June 2008
- "Full Stop" (EMI – download only) – September 2008

=== Albums ===
- Repeat After Me (EMI) – September 2008
