= Darkness Brings the Wonders Home =

Studio album by Smoke Fairies
- Released: 31 January 2020
- Genre: Alternative; dream pop; folk rock; indie rock
- Length: 41:12
- Label: Year Seven Records

Smoke Fairies chronology
Live at St Pancras Old Church (2015)	Darkness Brings the Wonders Home (2020)	Singles (2022)

Singles from Darkness Brings the Wonders Home
- 1. "Out of the Woods" Released: 2019; 2. "Disconnect" Released: 2020; 3. "Elevator" Released: 2020

Darkness Brings the Wonders Home is the fifth studio album by English duo Smoke Fairies. It was released in January 2020, on the band's Year Seven Records label. It marked the return of much-anticipated new music from Smoke Fairies after a 5 year break.

== Background ==
The album was produced by Phil Ek in Seattle, Washington; the first time the band had recorded an album outside of the UK.

In an interview for Cryptic Rock, the duo discussed their musical direction on the album and the inspiration behind the tracks, "We wanted each part to be clear and for nothing unnecessary to be added. The focus needed to come back to us as a duo, and so we played all the parts – except the drums, but we were very clear about how we wanted them to sound. We wanted the songs to be very riff led and driven" [KB]...."All sorts of things inspired the record. The feeling of doom in the air right now, lack of human connection in the digital age and failed relationships. We tried to use nature references to tell these stories: flies trapped in florescent bulbs, insects living in stagnant ponds, weird creatures lurking just out of sight. And people, interactions good or bad, have been a huge influence" [JD].

In a review for Clash magazine, Josh Gray wrote, "Every song is carried by their two core strengths: effortless harmonised vocals and a knack for trading bluesy guitar licks. Lead singles ‘Out Of The Woods’ and ‘Disconnect’ showcase a renewed commitment to the ‘Electric Mud’-style blues riffing they fell in love with back when they lived in New Orleans"

"Elevator"
Elevator reached no.1 in the Official UK Physical and Vinyl Singles charts.

Bill Golembeski of Folking magazine discusses the band's strong folk-rock vibe on the album. "..But, back to those first two songs, ‘On The Wing’ and ‘Elevator’: The former clears the air with a strident bottle-necked pulse, while those twin voices hover like angry spectres. Ahh, ‘Elevator’ plays a four aces riff, worthy of any card-carrying rock band of the 70’s with wah-wah intensity. And there’s a rhythmic piano to boot! It’s a wonderous rock tune.."

The album arrived shortly before the first COVID-19 outbreak. Although some early launch gigs took place, many other planned activities were put on hold/performed as streamed events. Smoke Fairies commented that this album took on special meaning for them, due to personal loss and the general isolation caused by the pandemic.

In April 2020, Smoke Fairies released 'No Matter How This Goes, Just Make Sure That You're Kind', a song recorded during the making of Darkness Brings The Wonders Home, but didn't make the final cut. The band wrote "It now seems this track makes sense and we wanted to share it because no matter how this situation goes, we are certain that if we just feed it love, good will conquer".

The album was released on standard and signed limited edition CD, 180g black vinyl, signed limited edition gold vinyl, deluxe limited edition black/gold splatter 'dinked' vinyl as well as digital download.

Professional ratings
Aggregate scores
Source	Rating
Metacritic	78/100
Review scores
Source	Rating
AllMusic	4/5 stars
Islington Gazette	4/5 stars
Clash Magazine	4/5 stars

== Track listing ==
Side A
No.	Title	Length
1.	"On the Wing"	4:21
2.	"Elevator"	3:17
3.	"Disconnect"	3:27
4.	"Coffee Shop Blues"	5:12
5.	"Left to Roll"	4:28

Side B
No.	Title	Length
1.	"Out of the Woods"	4:01
2.	"Chocolate Rabbit"	3:48
3.	"Chew Your Bones"	4:57
4.	"Don't You Want to Spiral Out of Control?"	4:14
5.	"Super Tremolo"	3:27

== Chart performance ==
Darkness Brings the Wonders Home reached the following chart positions:

Chart (2020)	Peak position
UK Independent Album Breakers	1
UK Rock & Metal Albums	1
UK Record Store	3
UK Independent Albums	6
UK Vinyl Albums	6
UK Physical Albums	18
UK Albums Sales	20
UK Top 100 Albums	81

== Personnel ==
All personnel credits adapted from Darkness Brings the Wonders Home liner notes.

- All songs written by Smoke Fairies
- Vocals and instruments by Smoke Fairies
- Drums and percussion by Davey Brozowski
- Produced, engineered and mixed by Phil Ek
- Assistant engineering by Garrett Reynolds
- Recorded at Studio Litho, Seattle, Washington
- Mixed at Electrokitty, Seattle, Washington
- Mastered by Paul Blakemore at CMG Mastering
- Photography by Annick Wolfers
- Design and illustrations by Daren Newman
- Marketed and distributed by Republic Of Music
