= Carried in Sound =

Studio album by Smoke Fairies
- Released: 17 November 2023
- Genre: Alternative; blues; dream pop; folk rock; indie rock
- Length: 45:46
- Label: Year Seven Records

Smoke Fairies chronology
Singles (2022)	Carried in Sound (2023)

Singles from Carried in Sound
- 1. "There Was a Hope" Released: May 2023; 2. "Vanishing Line" Released: September 2023; 3. "Seek it With Me" Released: October 2023

Carried in Sound is the sixth studio album by English duo Smoke Fairies. It was released in November 2023 on the band's Year Seven Records label.

== Background ==
The album was the first to be recorded and produced by the band at home, and was crafted by the duo, with support from "long-term collaborator, Neil Walsh, adding wistful viola parts that are overlaid to create a one-man orchestra that blend perfectly with the duo’s guitars to create a lush sound" - Silent Radio.

During the evolution of the record, Smoke Fairies shared works in progress and ideas with fans via their Patreon site, even asking them to vote for an album title. Prior to the album launch, Smoke Fairies released "Sticks and Stones EP", which included the title track, "Come to my Mind" and "Part of it All".

"Seek it With Me"
Single "Seek It With Me" has a Clannad-like quality to it" – Buzz Magazine

In an interview with Americana UK, answering a question about the record and her working partnership with Davies, Blaimire replied, "we called it 'Carried In Sound’ and I think there is a feeling we’ve been carried by music through our lives, and carried along by it in our friendship". Speaking to The Line of Best Fit, Davies reflected, "Although the album has themes of sadness on there, it's looking at those things from a place of strength".

In a review for KLOF Magazine, Mike Davies wrote, "Carried in Sound is an emotionally evocative album textured musically, vocally and lyrically with shadows and light, like a comforting flickering candle in the depth of darkness and storms; it’s easily the best thing that the Smoke Fairies have ever done".

The band invited their Patreons to be extras in their 'Vanishing Line' music video, which was filmed in the village of Ulting, Essex in July 2023.

A series of record store gigs, concerts and festival performance were held in 2023/24 to celebrate the record.

Carried in Sound was released on translucent orange vinyl, limited edition signed translucent blue vinyl exclusive to Rough Trade, CD and digital download.

Sticks and Stones

"Bruised by life and seeking solace in the lonely songs that play out from the radio, a love sick loner waits for nightfall to walk the path of a long lost city river. Anxious about the self-destructive nature of humanity, she collects the city's rubbish, searching for sticks, cans and stones to build an ark in time for the apocalyptic rise of water, when the river will reclaim its place in the city."

— Smoke Fairies: Instagram, December 2022

Professional ratings
Review scores
Source	Rating
Buzz Magazine	4/5 stars
Slant Magazine	4/5 stars
XSNoize	4/5 stars
Far Out Magazine	3/5 stars

== Track listing ==
Side A
No.	Title	Length
1.	"Vague Ideas"	4:58
2.	"Vanishing Line"	4:14
3.	"Carried in Sound"	4:11
4.	"There Was a Hope"	3:54
5.	"Seek It with Me"	3:44

Side B
No.	Title	Length
1.	"Sticks and Stones"	5:44
2.	"Part of It All"	4:22
3.	"2002"	4:33
4.	"Perseus"	2:56
5.	"Come to My Mind"	4:13
6.	"Seek It with Me" (Instrumental)	2:57

== Chart performance ==
Carried in Sound reached the following chart positions:

Chart (2023)	Peak position
UK Independent Album Breakers	3
UK Folk Albums	6
UK Record Store	15
UK Independent Albums	16
UK Physical Albums	53
UK Albums Sales	54
Scottish Top 100 Albums	89

== Personnel ==
All personnel credits adapted from Carried in Sound album notes.

- All songs written by Smoke Fairies
- Vocals and instruments by Smoke Fairies
- Viola by Neil Walsh
- Produced by Katherine Blamire
- Recorded by Smoke Fairies
- Mixed by Dan Austin and Ian Davenport
- Mastered at Metropolis by Matt Colton
- Photography by Annick Wolfers
- Sleeve by Nayfe Slusjan
- Worldwide Management by Doug Hart and Matt Harvey
