= Ghosts (Smoke Fairies album) =

Compilation album by Smoke Fairies
- Released: 17 April 2010
- Genre: Blues, folk
- Length: 39:08
- Label: 453 Music

Smoke Fairies chronology
Strange the Things (2005)	Ghosts (2010)	Through Low Light and Trees (2010)

Singles from Ghosts
- 1. "Living With Ghosts" Released: 10 July 2008; 2. "Frozen Heart" Released: 13 July 2009; 3. "Sunshine" Released: 2 November 2009

Ghosts is the first compilation album by English duo Smoke Fairies. It was released in April 2010, before their first studio album, on the 453 Music label.

== Background ==
The band had written and recorded a number of songs, some of which were released as singles and others appeared on the Frozen Heart EP (2009). Ghosts brought these early works together on one record. The cover art describes the record as "A collection of A sides & B sides and an EP from the recent past".

"Living With Ghosts"
The Smoke Fairies' debut single, released in 2008. The cover art was created by Smoke Fairies.

The compilation includes the band's debut single, "Living With Ghosts". In an review at the time of its release, Sarah Maybank of Pennyblackmusic wrote, "For an outfit so preoccupied with sadness and loss, Smoke Fairies can’t help enjoying themselves (“We like to stretch the boundaries of jolly”, Kaf told the audience brightly at the launch gig for their new single ‘Living With Ghosts’, a break-up lament so heavy-hearted it makes you want to write hate mail to all your exes in sympathy)".

"Living With Ghosts" was awarded 'Track of the Day' on 11 September 2008, by The Times.

Ghosts was released on black and grey marbled vinyl, limited edition black/white vinyl and CD. In 2013, a twin CD was released which included bonus tracks and an insert describing the album's history. The CDs were released on the Music For Heroes Records label.

Professional ratings
Review scores
Source	Rating
PopMatters	6/10
Record Collector	4/5 stars

== Track listing ==
Side A
No.	Title	Length
1.	"Sunshine"	4:38
2.	"When You Grow Old"	2:44
3.	"Living With Ghosts"	4:55
4.	"Troubles"	4:03

Side B
No.	Title	Length
1.	"Frozen Heart"	4:28
2.	"Fences"	3:17
3.	"Morning Light"	4:20
4.	"We Had Lost Our Minds"	5:37
5.	"He's Moving On"	4:39

Bonus CD
No.	Title	Length
1.	"The Water Waits"	4:05
2.	"Bones"	4:40
3.	"Another Night"	3:48
4.	"Riverbed"	5:14
5.	"Good Man"	4:01
6.	"I Get So Lonely"	2:56
7.	"Tonight"	4:50
8.	"Road Is Long"	3:09
9.	"Sea Shanty II"	5:15

== Personnel ==
All personnel credits adapted from Ghosts sleeve notes. Not all personnel appear on every track.

Main compilation

- All songs written by Smoke Fairies
- Guitars and vocals – Smoke Fairies
- Double bass – Al Mobbs & Tim Harries
- Viola – Neil Walsh & Una Pallisa
- Guitorgan, mellotron, percussion, organ, hurdy gurdy, piano & bass pedals – Leo Abrahams
- Drums – Andy Newmark
- Tracks 1, 5, 7 recorded by Tom Dalgety at Miloco 'The Square', London & produced by David Coulter
- Tracks 2, 3, 4, 6, 8, 9 recorded by Leo Abrahams at Cafe Music, East London & produced by Leo Abrahams
- Artwork – Smoke Fairies

Bonus CD

- All songs written by Smoke Fairies
- Guitars and vocals – Smoke Fairies
- Backing vocals, accordion, bass, electric guitar, harmonium, hurdy gurdy, mandolin, organ, percussion, piano – Leo Abrahams
- Double bass – Tim Harries
- Drums – Ryan Barkataki
- Percussion – Smoke Fairies
- Recorded and Produced by Leo Abrahams
