= Clock Opera =

British indie rock band

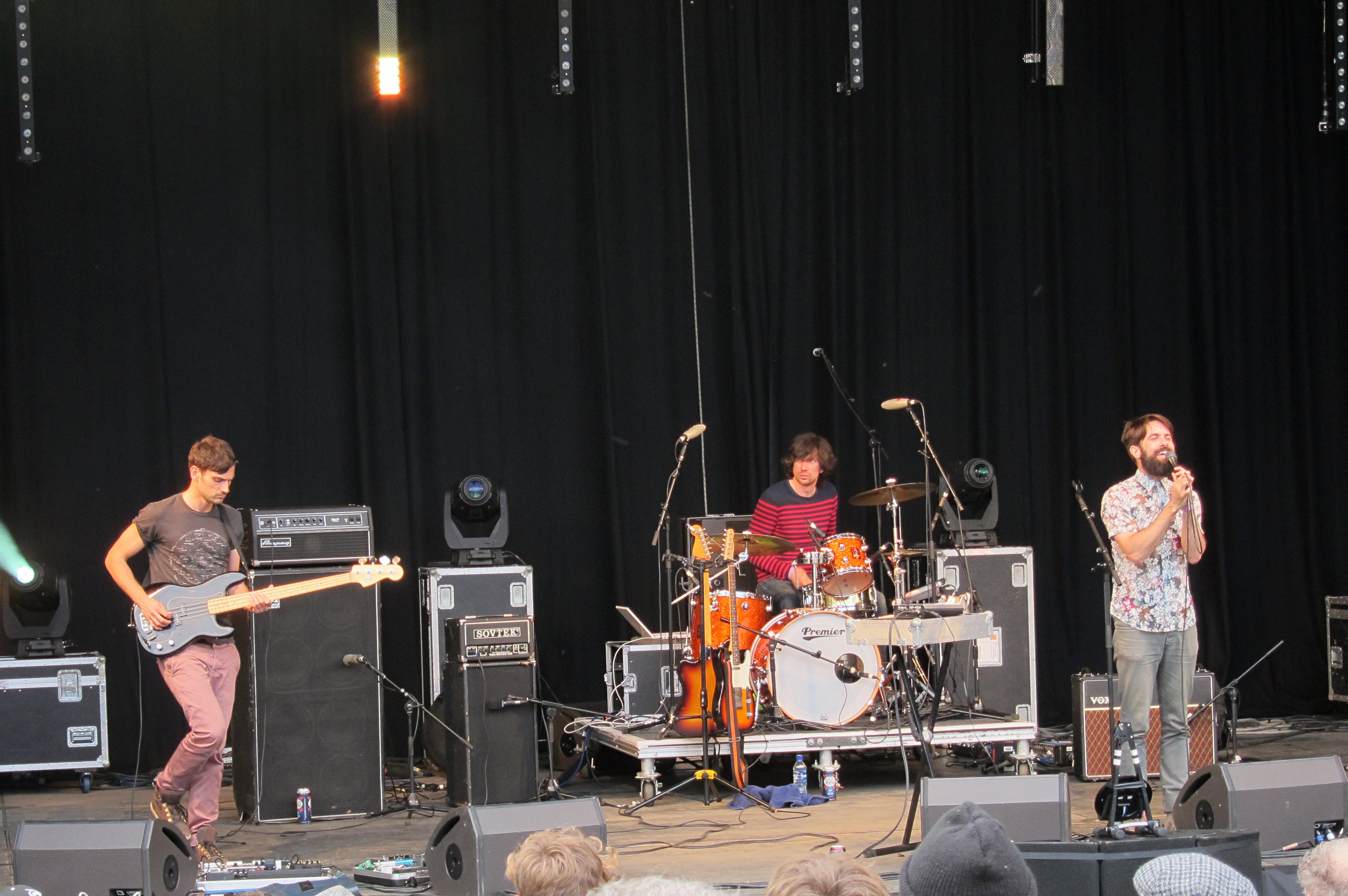
- Performing at the Summer Sundae festival, August 2012. From left to right: Andy West, Che Albrighton, Guy Connelly.

Background information
- Origin: London, England
- Genres: Alternative rock, indie rock
- Years active: 2009–2022
- Labels: Moshi Moshi, Island
- Past members: Guy Connelly; Che Albrighton; Nic Nell; Dan Armstrong; Andy West
- Website: clockopera.com

Clock Opera were a British indie rock band based in London. Formed in 2009 by singer, guitarist and sampler Guy Connelly, the quartet also comprised Andy West on bass and guitar, Che Albrighton on drums, and Dan Armstrong on keyboards and vocals. Their singles include "Belongings" and "Once and for All," and their debut album Ways to Forget was released on 23 April 2012. Guy Connelly also does remixes for other artists under the name Clock Opera.

== Career ==
=== Ways To Forget (2009–2012) ===
Clock Opera was started in 2009 by Guy Connelly, who was previously in The Fallout Trust and The Corrections. It began as a solo project and developed into a four-piece band. Connelly lived in a warehouse with bassist and guitarist Andy West, who was in the band Doloroso. Drummer Che Albrighton, whose previous bands include Bikini Atoll, played with West, and Connelly did some recording for them. Keyboardist Dan Armstrong, formerly of The Rushes, was another friend of Connelly's who was invited to join Clock Opera after attending one of their early gigs. Connelly says he named the band after a symphony written for pocket watches, while Armstrong calls the name Clock Opera apt "because of the infinite ticking rhythms and because we like to sing grandiose and emotive melodies."

Clock Opera's debut single "White Noise" backed with "Alouette" was released on 7" vinyl by Pure Groove Records on 16 November 2009. In 2010, the band put out two EPs on French labels: "A Piece of String" from Maman Records and "Once and for All" from Kitsuné. Both EPs included remixes of the singles.

In 2011, the songs "Belongings" and "Move to the Mountains" were used in two episodes of the American television series Chuck. "Belongings" was released as a single by the band's new label Moshi Moshi Records on 9 May 2011, followed by an EP of "Lesson No. 7" with remixes. The music video of "Lesson No. 7," directed by Aoife McArdle, was nominated for a UK Music Video Award.

Leading up to their debut album on Island Records, Clock Opera released a new recording of "Once and for All," accompanied by a music video directed by Ben Strebel and starring Dudley Sutton. The video had over 175,000 views worldwide on YouTube in the first two weeks. In March 2012, Clock Opera constructed a song called "Clock Operation" from samples submitted by fans and artists such as Maxïmo Park and Everything Everything.

Ways to Forget was released on 23 April 2012. The Sunday Times placed the album at number 7 on their list of best debuts of 2012. In their review, the Sunday Times called Ways to Forget "one of the indisputable masterpieces of British pop in 2012" and Clock Opera "a band of rare sonic ambition and scope." Clash described the album as "a bar-raiser—an album of intelligent synth-pop bubbling with humanity." Conversely, BBC Music called it "a product of perfectionism, but one where mechanical process obscures its human presence," while The Guardian said the album "...can seem almost beautiful. But more often than not, there's too much crammed in to be able pick those moments out."

Clock Opera's song "The Lost Buoys" was used as part of the background music for the BBC's coverage of the 2012 Summer Olympics. The music video for the single was directed by Ben Strebel and stars Alun Armstrong—father of keyboardist Dan Armstrong—along with Maggie O'Neill and Catherine Steadman.

=== Venn & crowdfunding (2015–2017) ===
On 28 May 2015, the band announced they would be starting a crowdfunding campaign to enable them to record their second LP in the summer of the same year. It was also revealed a few days later that keyboardist Dan Armstrong had left the band in 2014.

Clock Opera shared a studio demo of a new track named "The Beast In Us" exclusively with contributors to their crowdfunding campaign on 18 June. The finalised version of the track is set to appear on the new LP.

On 5 November 2015, the first track from the band's upcoming second LP, titled "Changeling", was premiered on DIY magazine's website and was co-produced and mixed by Kristofer Harris.

On 8 March 2016, the second track from upcoming LP Venn, titled "In Memory", premiered on Consequence of Sound's website. Later, on 19 October 2016, the band shared a third track from the new LP, titled "Whippoorwill". It was also announced that the LP would be released on 10 February 2017, through !K7 records.

=== Carousel (2019–2022) ===
On 12 September 2019, Clock Opera's Instagram page began posting a series of images in countdown to the release of a new single. The images formed the artwork for the single, which was released on 20 September, and is titled "Be Somebody Else". It was also announced that long-time band member, Andy West, had departed the group, and that a third album was set to be released in "early 2020". The album was later revealed to be titled Carousel, with a release date of 7 February 2020. The band released the album's title track as a single with an accompanying music video on 1 November 2019, and then the album's third single, "Imaginary Nation", on 10 January 2020.

The band was set to tour the UK & Europe, beginning in London on 21 March 2020, but this was postponed due to the COVID-19 pandemic.

On 20 April 2022, the band announced they would go forward with their delayed shows in both the UK and Europe in May, and that the tour would also be their last. The band formally split following the end of the tour.

== Live performances ==
One of Clock Opera's earliest concerts was live accompaniment of a performance by the Rambert Dance Company at Queen Elizabeth Hall in May 2009. Clock Opera performed on the BBC Introducing stage at the Reading and Leeds Festivals in 2011. They played at South by Southwest in 2011 and 2012 and at numerous other festivals such as Great Escape, Liverpool Sound City, Dot to Dot, and Latitude, where they headlined the Lake Stage curated by Huw Stephens in 2012. Clock Opera have supported a number of other bands including Marina and the Diamonds, Maxïmo Park, Metronomy and The Temper Trap.

With the release of Ways to Forget in 2012, Clock Opera had their first headline tour in the United Kingdom as well as dates in New York and continental Europe. They toured Germany in September 2012. The Lost Buoys Tour in October and November 2012 covered Belgium, the Netherlands, Denmark, the UK, Ireland, Japan, France, Luxembourg and Switzerland. During the tour, the band performed on the television programme De Kruitfabriek on the Belgian channel VIER.

In 2013, Clock Opera had a concert in Singapore and a short tour in Europe and also performed at the Pukkelpop festival in Belgium.

A signature of Clock Opera's live shows is the use of metal tankards and trays as percussion instruments during the song "A Piece of String."

== Musical style ==
Clock Opera's songwriting process begins with instrumental and found sounds that Connelly cuts up and manipulates into samples. This process is illustrated in a series of "Making of" videos showing, for example, how sounds including a tattoo needle, a washing machine and the buzzer on the game Operation were used in the song "White Noise." The band builds on these foundations to create the music, and Connelly writes the lyrics, usually last.

== Band members ==
- Guy Connelly – lead vocals, guitar, samples
- Che Albrighton – drums
- Nic Nell - keyboard, samples, bass, backing vocals
- Dan Armstrong – keyboards, samples, backing vocals
- Andy West – bass, guitar

== Discography ==
=== Albums ===
- Ways to Forget (Moshi Moshi/Island, 23 April 2012)
- Venn (!K7/League of Imaginary Nations, 10 February 2017)
- Carousel (!K7/League of Imaginary Nations, 7 February 2020)

=== EPs ===
- "A Piece of String Remixes" (Maman Records, 7 June 2010)
- "Once and for All" (Kitsuné, 25 October 2010)
- "Lesson No.7" (Moshi Moshi/Island, 3 October 2011)
- "Man Made" (Moshi Moshi/Island, 16 April 2012)
- "You've Got What I Need" (League of Imaginary Nations, 3 November 2017)
- "Run Remixes" (League of Imaginary Nations, 20 November 2020)

=== Singles ===
- "White Noise" (Pure Groove Records, 16 November 2009)
- "A Piece of String" (Maman Records, 7 June 2010)
- "Belongings" (Moshi Moshi, 9 May 2011)
- "Once and for All" (Moshi Moshi/Island, 3 February 2012)
- "Belongings" (Moshi Moshi/Island, 30 July 2012)
- "The Lost Buoys" (Moshi Moshi/Island, 5 November 2012)
- "Be Somebody Else" (!K7/League of Imaginary Nations, 20 September 2019)
- "Carousel" (!K7/League of Imaginary Nations, 1 November 2019)
- "Imaginary Nation" (!K7/League of Imaginary Nations, 10 January 2020)
- "Locked In" (!K7/League of Imaginary Nations, 4 May 2022)
- "Houses of Novelty" (!K7/League of Imaginary Nations, 17 May 2022)

=== Music videos ===
- "White Noise" - directed by Aoife McArdle
- "Once and for All (original version)" - directed by Duckeye
- "Belongings" - directed by Andy West
- "Lesson No.7" - directed by Aoife McArdle
- "Once and for All (album version)" - directed by Ben Strebel
- "Man Made" - directed by Ben Reed
- "The Lost Buoys" - directed by Ben Strebel
- "Whippoorwill" - directed by Andy West
- "Closer" - directed by Jey Mal
- "You've Got What I Need" - directed by Andy West
- "Carousel" - directed by Nic Nell & Guy Connelly

=== Remixes ===
Remixes are done by Guy Connelly under the name Clock Opera.

- Architecture in Helsinki - "Contact High"
- Au Revoir Simone - "Tell Me" and "Let the Night Win"
- Blood Orange - "Champagne Coast"
- Christine and the Queens - "Tilted"
- The Drums - "Me and the Moon"
- Everything Everything - "MY KZ, UR BF"
- Feist - "How Come You Never Go There"
- Gris-de-Lin - "Sprung"
- Charlotte Gainsbourg - "Anna"
- The Golden Filter - "Hide Me"
- Marina and the Diamonds - "I Am Not a Robot"
- Metronomy - "The Bay"
- Niki & the Dove - "Somebody"
- Phenomenal Handclap Band - "Baby"
- Tracey Thorn - "You Are a Lover"
