= Story Books =

- Origin: Sittingbourne, Kent, England
- Genres: Alternative, indie
- Years active: 2010–2015
- Label: Music for Heroes
- Members: Kristofer Harris (vocals / guitar); Robert Wilks (drums); Joseph Whitnell (bass); Andrew Parry (keyboards); Jack Tarrant (guitar)
- Website: storybooksband.com

Story Books were a British five-piece band from Sittingbourne, Kent, England, who play alternative / indie music.

In June 2012 the band's track "Peregrine" was added to the BBC Radio 1 playlist as BBC Introducing's 'tip of the week'. "Peregrine" received regular airplay on Huw Stephens' show, as well as being played by daytime DJs including Scott Mills and Fearne Cotton.

The band have supported acts including Bloc Party, Grouplove, James Vincent McMorrow and Kyla La Grange, and performed at the Belladrum, Rockness and Lounge On The Farm festivals.

== Discography ==
=== Singles ===
- "All Those Arrows" (Music for Heroes - 5 March 2012)
- "Peregrine" (Music for Heroes - 9 July 2012)
