= Diagrams (band) =

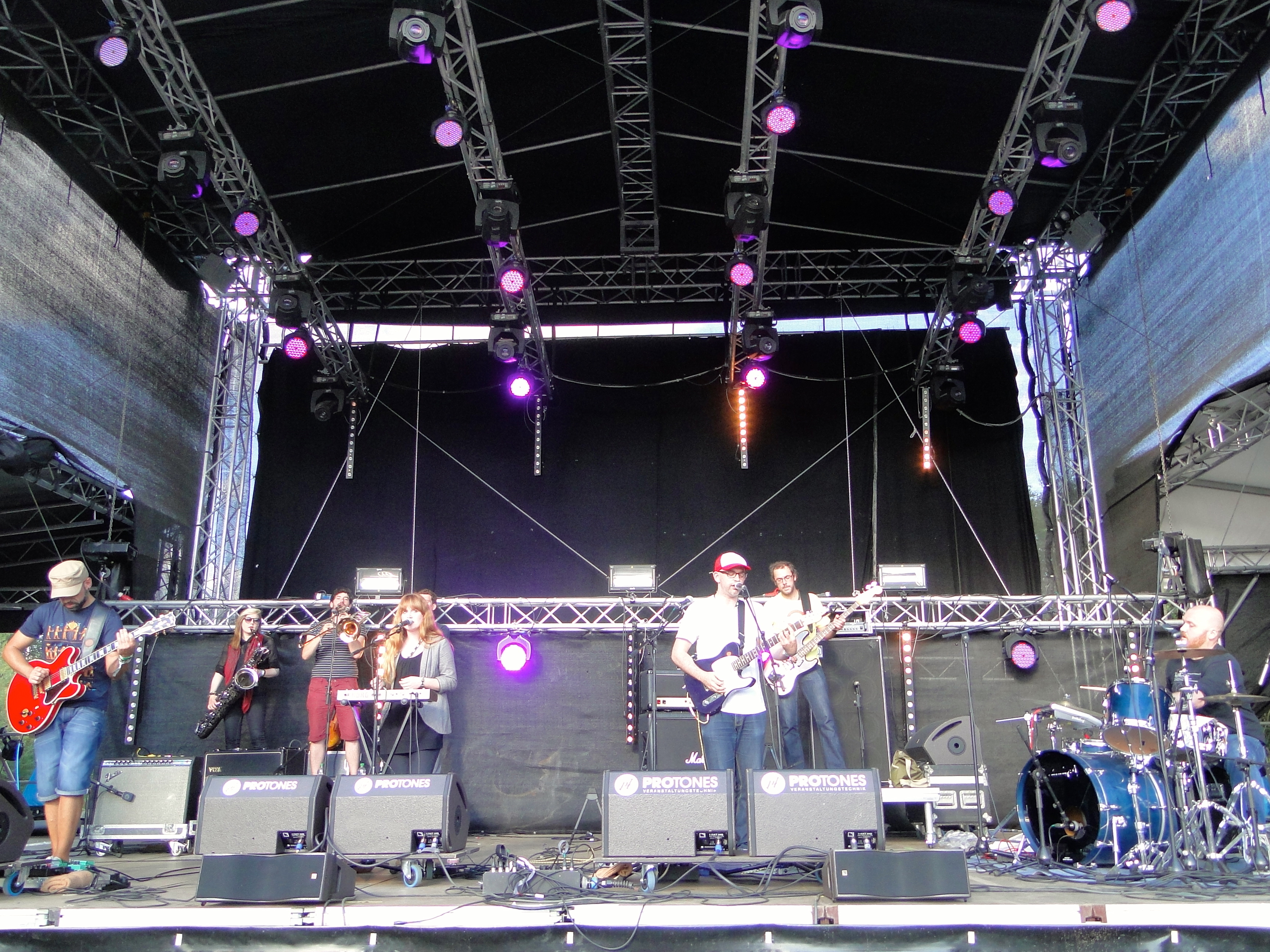
- Diagrams performing live at Dockville Festival, Germany 2012

Background information
- Origin: London, England
- Genres: Folk, indie pop, indie rock
- Years active: 2011–present
- Label: Full Time Hobby
- Website: diagramsmusic.com

Diagrams is a UK band made up of Sam Genders (previously of Tunng and The Accidental and currently half of duo Throws) and an occasionally rotating collective of musicians.

== Releases ==
Diagrams have released a five-track EP called Diagrams (2011) and an album called Black Light (2012) on the label Full Time Hobby, both of which were made with producer Mark Brydon in his Rubber Duck studios next to a canal and a garden on the Kensal Road in London. 2015 album Chromatics was a collaborative effort with producer Leo Abrahams.

The 2017 album Dorothy is a collaboration with poet Dorothy Trogdon. Dorothy features production from Kristofer Harris and Mike Lindsay.

== Discography ==
- Black Light (2012)
- Chromatics (2015)
- Dorothy (2017)
