= Strange the Things =

Recording by Smoke Fairies
- Released: 2005
- Genre: Alternative; blues; folk rock
- Length: 56:03
- Label: Concentrated People

Smoke Fairies chronology
Strange the Things (2005)	Ghosts (2010)

Strange the Things is the first record to be released by English duo Smoke Fairies. It was first published on CD in 2005, on the Concentrated People label.

== Background ==
Professional ratings
Review scores
Source	Rating
Rate Your Music	3/5
Norman Records	4/5 stars

Although Strange the Things was the band's first official release, Smoke Fairies does not refer to it as their first studio album. In one Smoke Signals podcast, the band alludes to 'sad situations' and 'questionable sound quality' as reasons for their reluctance to embrace it.

In Piccadilly Records' End of year review 2007, Strange the Things charted at #9 in the new-psyche-folk/americana-folk top 20.

On 1 September 2025, the band posted the recording's 20th anniversary on its social media sites.

In March 2026, Smoke Fairies posted a home recording of "Catching Leaves" on their Patreon site, describing it as a "mythical track from a mythical album", and one which they played frequently during the early days of touring in the US and in London.

== Track listing ==
No.	Title	Length
1.	"Dinner Plate"	3:24
2.	"Smoke Filled Room"	4:07
3.	"Always in the Back"	2:53
4.	"Catching Leaves"	4:37
5.	"Wedding Gown"	4:23
6.	"Cold Wind"	3:33
7.	"Strange the Things"	3:43
8.	"Good Day to be Alive"	3:17
9.	"I'll Move On"	3:37
10.	"You Can't"	4:49
11.	"Running Alongside a Train" (Hidden track starts at 14:00)	17:40

== Personnel ==
All personnel credits adapted from Strange the Things sleeve notes.

- All songs written and performed by Smoke Fairies
- Produced by Ian Dejong and Smoke Fairies
- Drums on "Running Alongside a Train" - Ian Dejong
- Cello on Wedding Gown - Tessa Bosworth
- Mastered by Benge@expandingrecords.com
- Photography by Helen Ridley
