= Ways to Forget =

Studio album by Clock Opera
- Released: 23 April 2012
- Recorded: The League of Imaginary Nations, London; The Studio Down Below, Bridport
- Genre: Indie rock
- Length: 43:46
- Label: Moshi Moshi and Island
- Producer: Guy Connelly

Clock Opera album chronology
Ways to Forget (2012)	Venn (2017)

Singles from Ways to Forget
- 1. "Once and for All" Released: 3 February 2012; 2. "Man Made" Released: 16 April 2012; 3. "Belongings" Released: 30 July 2012; 4. "The Lost Buoys" Released: 5 November 2012

Professional ratings
Review scores
Source	Rating
Metacritic	59/100
Q Magazine	3/5 stars
The Guardian	2/5 stars
The Times	4/5 stars
Beats Per Minute	(67%)

Ways to Forget is the debut studio album of British indie rock group Clock Opera, released on 23 April 2012. Prior to the album, the band made singles for the songs "White Noise," "A Piece of String," "Once and for All" and "Belongings." An EP of "Lesson No.7" was released on 3 October 2011. The first single from the album was a new recording of "Once and for All" on 3 February 2012. An EP of "Man Made" and its remixes was released on 16 April 2012. "Belongings" was re-released on 30 July 2012. A single of "The Lost Buoys" was released for 5 November 2012.

== Track listing ==
All lyrics are written by Guy Connelly except where noted; all music is composed by Clock Opera

No.	Title	Length
1.	"Once and for All"	5:14
2.	"Lesson No.7"	4:25
3.	"11th Hour"	4:44
4.	"Man Made"	4:08
5.	"Belongings"	4:53
6.	"White Noise"	3:35
7.	"A Piece of String"	3:29
8.	"The Lost Buoys"	4:07
9.	"Move to the Mountains"	4:25
10.	"Fail Better" (incorporates an excerpt from Worstward Ho by Samuel Beckett)	4:46

Deluxe Edition Tracks
No.	Title	Length
11.	"Ways to Forget"	3:36
12.	"Alouette"	4:34
13.	"New Arrivals"	4:24
14.	"Let Go the Lifeboats"	2:50
15.	"Glass Eye"	3:38
16.	"Seven Hours"	3:45
17.	"Outro"	2:18

iTunes Bonus Track
No.	Title	Length
18.	"Once and for All" (Under the Floorboards)	4:21

== Personnel ==
Clock Opera

- Guy Connelly – lead vocals, guitar, samples
- Andy West – bass, guitar
- Che Albrighton – drums
- Dan Armstrong – keyboards, samples, backing vocals

Production

- Guy Connelly – production and recording
- Xavier Stephenson, assisted by Liam Nolan – recording drums on tracks 1–9 at Metropolis Studios
- Matt Wills – recording drums on track 10 at The Square
- Cenzo Townshend, assisted by Sean Julliard – mixing tracks 1–4 & 10
- Dan Grech-Marguerat – mixing tracks 5–9
- Richard Robinson – design and art direction
- Mads Perch – photography
- Jonathan Goddard, Gemma Nixon, Alexander Whitley, Malgorzata Dzierzon – dancers on album artwork
