= Becky Becky =

British electro-synth-pop duo

- Genres: Electro-synth-pop
- Years active: 2011–present
- Labels: Woodland
- Website: www.becky-becky.com

Becky Becky are a British literary-inspired electro-synth-pop duo composed of Gemma L. Williams and Peter J D Mason. They have released the studio albums Good Morning, Midnight (2014), Maraca (2021) and Human / Animal (2024).

== Musical career ==
Williams' previous music project was Woodpecker Wooliams and Mason was a member of Fence Collective.

Becky Becky released a debut single, The Harder Stuff, in 2011. Their debut album in 2014 is based on Jean Rhys' 1939 novel Good Morning, Midnight—the novel deals with a woman's feelings of vulnerability, depression, loneliness and desperation during the years between the two World Wars.

Their In Honour Of 'Silent Shout' (2016) digital-only album is a cover of The Knife's 2006 album Silent Shout, released on the ten-year anniversary of Silent Shout's release.

Their 2021 album, Maraca, and a series of singles/EPs, are based on a short story by Williams that was published in Stim: An Autistic Anthology (2020). "It tells the story of a doomed relationship between a young autistic woman from England and an older Chilean man, married with children. Against the backdrop of the skyscrapers and mountains of Santiago de Chile, themes of infidelity, isolation and alienation are explored through the lyrics".

== Discography ==
=== Albums ===
- Good Morning, Midnight (self-released/Feint, 2014)
- Good Morning, Midnight – Live (self-released/Feint, 2015)
- In Honour Of 'Silent Shout' (self-released, 2016) – digital release
- Maraca (Woodland, 2021)
- Human / Animal (self-released, 2024)

=== Singles and EPs ===
- The Harder Stuff (self-released, 2011) – 9 tracks
- Champagne On Christmas Day EP (self-released/Feint, 2014) – digital release
- "Fire & Wings" (self-released/Feint, 2014)
- "House Of The Black Madonna" (self-released/Feint, 2015)
- "Tigers Are Better-Looking" (Personal Theatre, 2016)
- "Hey, Santiago!" (Woodland, 2021)
- The Mountain EP (Woodland, 2021)
- The Dance EP (Woodland, 2021)
- Symmetry (Woodland, 2021)
