= Woodpecker Wooliams =

- Birth name: Gemma Williams
- Instrument(s): voice, harp, analogue synths and noise
- Years active: 2009–2013
- Website: www.woodpeckerwooliams.com

Woodpecker Wooliams was the musical moniker of Brighton, UK-based musician Gemma Williams. She produced music as Woodpecker Wooliams from 2009 to 2013, releasing the studio albums Diving Down (2009) and The Bird School of Being Human (2012). Williams has since worked on Becky Becky with Peter J D Mason.

== History ==
Woodpecker Wooliams, consisting of voice, harp, analogue synths and 'noise', began in 2009 after Williams' midwifery training was interrupted by "a sudden and severe illness".

An album called The Bird School of Being Human was released on Robot Elephant Records in September 2012, co-produced with Marcus Hamblett. It was described by The Sunday Times as "a stunning find", and "musically and emotionally belting" in a BBC Music review. In 2012 Woodpecker Wooliams was The Guardian's "New band of the Day". Woodpecker Wooliams performed a live radio session in 2013 for Tom Robinson's BBC Radio 6 show. Music from this album, and the earlier Diving Down (2009) was played on BBC Radio 3's Late Junction show, by Rob da Bank on BBC Radio 1, and BBC Radio 6 Music programmes including Stuart Maconie's Freak Zone and BBC Music Introducing.

In 2013 Woodpecker Wooliams performed at the Yoko Ono-curated Meltdown festival at the Queen Elizabeth Hall supporting Cibo Matto. Woodpecker Wooliams toured numerous headline tours around Germany, Denmark, Italy, Russia and The Baltics between 2010 and 2013.

Woodpecker Wooliams collaborated with several other musicians, including lending featured guest vocals to the lead single "Meltdown" from Ghostpoet's sophomore album Some Say I So I Say Light; harp on the track "Fire" for the Emanative album The Light Years Of The Darkness; and guest vocals (with Rag'n'Bone Man) on Button Eyes' single "Simple Days", performed live for BBC's Radio 4 programme Loose Ends.

The final Woodpecker Wooliams performance was at the End of The Road festival in 2013. Williams announced the "death" of the project on her website in September 2013.

== Discography ==
Albums

- Diving Down (Autumn Ferment, 2009) – CD
- The Bird School of Being Human (Robot Elephant, 2012) – CD and vinyl

Singles

- "Gull" (Robot Elephant, 2012)
- "Sparrow" (Robot Elephant, 2012)

EPs

- Fledgling (A Beard of Snails, 2009)
- Sleeping Under Dark Suns (My Dance The Skull, 2010) – cassette
- Patryoska (The Woolshop, 2011) – CD-R, cassette
  - Patryoska (Full of Nothing, 2012) – re-release

Soundtracks

- Anni (Love Lion, Chicago, 2012) – collaboration with OCDC, a score to the German film Anni (1948)

Live albums

- Woodpecker Wooliams and Golden Cup meet Love Cult – In Russia (Full of Nothing, 2012)

Compilation album appearances

- Expulsion Into Offering #4 (A Beard Of Snails, 2010) – Expulsion Into Offering Tape Series cassette album, includes "Mill And Moss" by Woodpecker Wooliams
- Stranger Songs II (Stranger Songs, 2010)
- Home Taping is Music 2 (Woodland, 2011)
- Willkommen Foxswap (Willkommen Collective, 2011)
