= Ghostpoet =

British vocalist, songwriter and musician (born 1983)

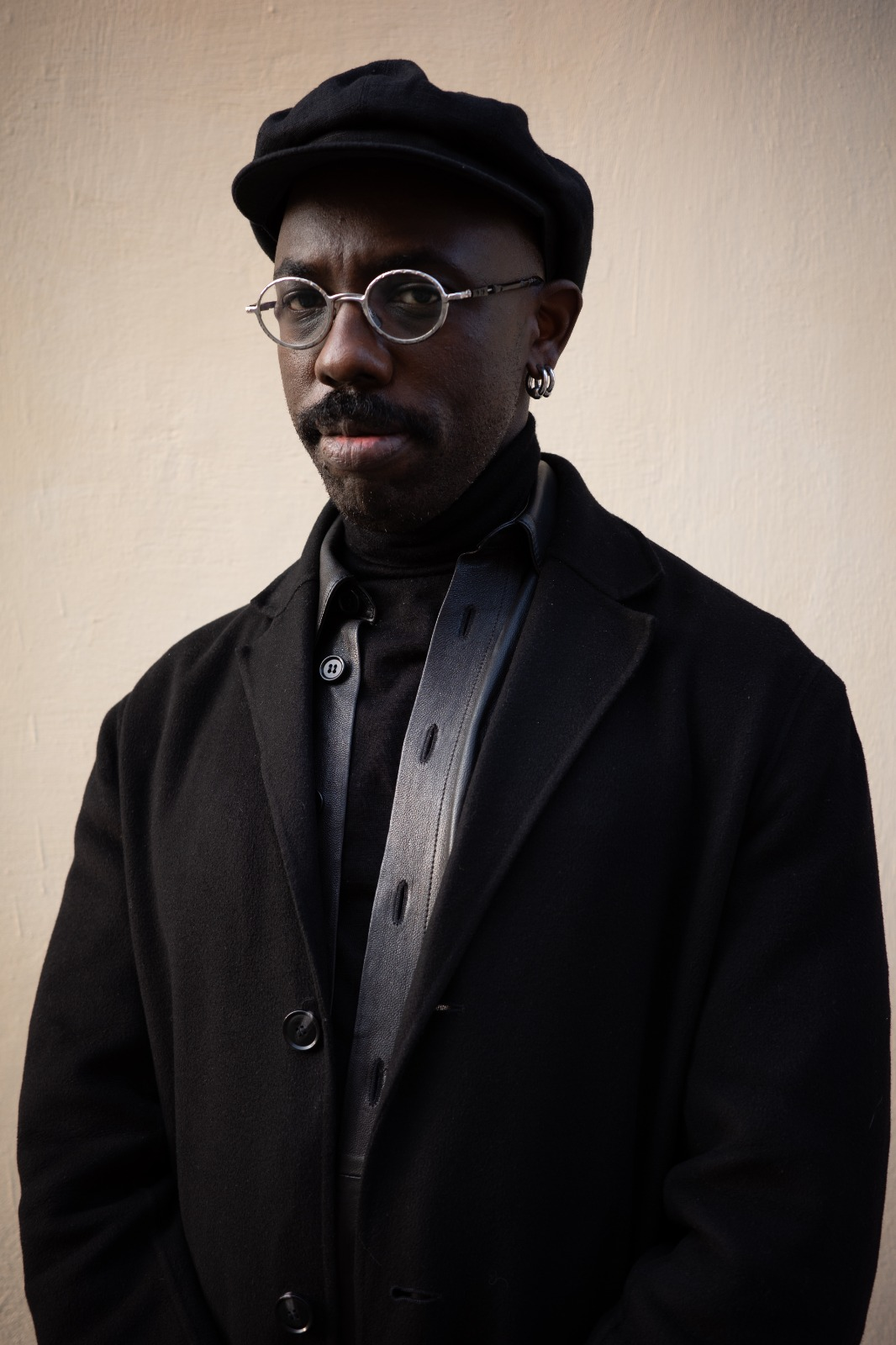
- Dr. Obaro Ejimiwe (Ghostpoet) in 2023

Background information
- Born: Obaro Ejimiwe; 18 January 1983 (age 43); London, England
- Genres: Trip hop; electronica; experimental hip-hop; spoken word; alt-rock; art pop
- Occupations: vocalist; songwriter; musician; DJ
- Years active: 2009–present
- Labels: PIAS; Brownswood
- Website: ghostpoet.org

Ghostpoet (born Obaro Ejimiwe; 18 January 1983) is a British vocalist, songwriter and musician. He released five critically acclaimed albums with two being nominated for the Mercury Prize. Based in Berlin, he has expanded his work to include fine art since 2021.

Ejimiwe was born in South London to a Nigerian father and a Dominican mother. At the age of 18, he enrolled at Coventry University and joined a grime/MC collective there. After moving back to London, he received two Mercury Prize nominations, for Peanut Butter Blues & Melancholy Jam (2011) and for Shedding Skin (2015). Other critically acclaimed albums are Some Say I So I Say Light (2013), Dark Days + Canapés (2017), and I Grow Tired but Dare Not Fall Asleep (2020). Since 2021, Ejimiwe has expanded his artistic practice into sound art, sculpture, installation, photography and video. He lives and works in Berlin, Germany.

== History ==
Ghostpoet's first known recordings were on the two mixtapes from 2009 Filthy Friends by Micachu and Kwesachu Mixtape Vol.1 by Kwes and Micachu.

In June 2010, Ghostpoet self-released his first EP, The Sound of Strangers, and was later featured in The Guardian's "New Band of the Day".

Ghostpoet's first single, "Cash & Carry Me Home", was released on 24 January 2011, followed by the debut album on 7 February 2011, Peanut Butter Blues & Melancholy Jam. His single "Survive It" was launched in Rough Trade East Record store, on London's Brick Lane on 9 May 2011.

In 2011, he supported Metronomy and Jamie Woon on their tours and performed at Glastonbury, Sónar, Latitude, Secret Garden Party, and Bestival, among others. Ghostpoet was among the nominees for the 2011 Mercury Prize.

In 2012, Ghostpoet's track "Finished I Ain't" appeared in the soundtrack of Sleeping Dogs and in the introduction title sequence to Top Boy (season 1). The EP "Meltdown" with guest vocals by Woodpecker Wooliams, was released in April 2013.

Ghostpoet's second album, Some Say I So I Say Light, was released on 6 May 2013. The album was preceded by the single "MSI musmiD", made available as a free download from SoundCloud.

His third album, Shedding Skin, was released on 2 March 2015. The album featured guest appearances by Nadine Shah, Etta Bond, Mélanie De Biasio, Lucy Rose and Paul Smith. The album was shortlisted for the 2015 Mercury Prize.

In 2016, Ghostpoet was featured on Massive Attack's song "Come Near Me", the B-side to "The Spoils". In the same year, Ghostpoet curated the West Balkans edition of the British Council's interactive music project Mix the City, travelling around the region to record samples with various local musicians, and creating his own mix for the region.

In April 2017, Ghostpoet released the single "Immigrant Boogie" via Play It Again, Sam. The track was produced by Leo Abrahams and mixed by Leo and Kristofer Harris. The track is the first from the album Dark Days + Canapés.

Ghostpoet released his fourth studio record, Dark Days + Canapés on 18 August 2017. His fifth album, I Grow Tired but Dare Not Fall Asleep, was released on 1 May 2020.

In November 2022, Obaro Ejimiwe received an Honorary Doctorate of Art by Coventry University in recognition of his extensive contribution to the arts.

In 2023, he performed on a new version of Massive Attack's "Paradise Circus" for the feature-length film Luther: The Fallen Sun.

In May 2024, Ghostpoet released his third EP entitled 'Am I the Change I Wish to See?' on his own independent label Modern Revenge Records via his Bandcamp page. In the same year, he composed the music for the short film 'Ataraxy 33' by Curtis Essel, in which the Brazilian dancer Noan Alves from the Stuttgart Ballet plays the leading role.

== Influences ==
Ghostpoet stated in an interview that he was inspired by musical mavericks and rule breakers, artists who have dared to swim against the current. He has shown a preference for innovative musicians who push the boundaries, take risks and combine different genres. As examples, he mentioned the following artists several times in interviews: Badly Drawn Boy, Radiohead, Muddy Waters, Portishead, Pharoah Sanders, The Clash, Captain Beefheart, Fela Kuti, Serge Gainsbourg, Nick Cave & the Bad Seeds, Little Dragon, and Squarepusher.

== Visual art ==
Since 2021, Ejimiwe has expanded his artistic practice into sound art, sculpture, installation, photography and video. In 2022 Ejimiwe premiered, in collaboration with artist Luiza Prado de O. Martins, the large-scale installation and performance series Blacknuss! Technologies of Joy, Care, and Intimacy at the Kampnagel International Summer Festival, in Hamburg. In his work, Ejimiwe explores themes related to African spiritualism, masculinity, identity, and Black joy.

== Discography ==
- Peanut Butter Blues & Melancholy Jam (2011)
- Some Say I So I Say Light (2013)
- Shedding Skin (2015)
- Dark Days + Canapés (2017)
- I Grow Tired but Dare Not Fall Asleep (2020)
