= Some Say I So I Say Light =

Studio album by Ghostpoet
- Released: 6 May 2013
- Genre: Trip-hop; future garage; electronica; UK rap; spoken word
- Length: 53:42
- Label: Play It Again Sam
- Producer: Ghostpoet; Richard Formby

Ghostpoet chronology
Peanut Butter Blues & Melancholy Jam (2011)	Some Say I So I Say Light (2013)	Shedding Skin (2015)

Some Say I So I Say Light is the second studio album by British singer Ghostpoet. It was released on 6 May 2013.

== Track listing ==
No.	Title	Length
1.	"Cold Win"	3:17
2.	"Them Waters"	5:02
3.	"Dial Tones"	5:31
4.	"Plastic Bag Brain"	4:34
5.	"ThymeThymeThyme"	3:44
6.	"Meltdown" (Guest vocals by Woodpecker Wooliams)	5:05
7.	"Sloth Trot"	6:41
8.	"Dorsal Morsel"	5:27
9.	"MSI musmiD"	4:09
10.	"12 Deaf"	5:28
11.	"Comatose"	4:54

== Critical reception ==
Professional ratings
Aggregate scores
Source	Rating
Metacritic	(79%)
Review scores
Source	Rating
Allmusic	4/5 stars
NME	(8/10)

Some Say I So I Say Light received generally favorable reviews from music critics.

== Single ==
"Meltdown", with guest vocals by Woodpecker Wooliams, was released as a single in April 2013.
