= Frozen Heart EP =

EP by Smoke Fairies
- Released: 13 July 2009
- Genre: Alternative; blues; folk rock
- Length: 22:20
- Label: Music For Heros

Frozen Heart EP is the second release from English duo Smoke Fairies.

== Background ==
Frozen Heart EP was released on 13 July 2009 and was the Smoke Fairies' first record to be produced in a professional recording studio. The title track and single "Frozen Heart" is a tale of two lost and confused people on a journey. A music video to accompany the single was filmed by the band in Rotherhithe, London, and features "two robots trying to find each other".

In a review of "Frozen Heart" for Band Weblogs, Jenny May wrote, "...the song has a vintage feel and could easily fit in with the festivals of the late 60's....the rhythmic instrumentation and percussion adds another level to the track - dreamy, mesmerizing. Superb". Uncut magazine featured Frozen Heart EP on their 19th Playlist of 2009, curated by John Mulvey.

Frozen Heart EP caught the attention of Jack White, when White, Blamire and Davies had a chance encounter one evening in a London bar. This led to a collaboration and the subsequent release of Smoke Fairies' double A-side single, "Gastown/Riversong", produced by White and released on his Third Man Records label.

"Frozen Heart"
Title track of the Frozen Heart EP

In a review for Norman Records, Phil Leigh wrote, "...this will appeal to those who like trad folk but are a bit adventurous as well (not rock climbing adventurous...maybe staying and having that extra pint in the pub when it's bedtime adventurous)...."

The EP was released on CD, and a black 7" Vinyl + CD bundle (limited edition of 500) and later became part of the Ghosts compilation album.

Professional ratings
Review scores
Source	Rating
Norman Records	4/5 stars

== Track listing ==
CD
No.	Title	Length
1.	"Frozen Heart"	4:29
2.	"Fences"	3:17
3.	"Morning Light"	4:20
4.	"We Had Lost Our Minds"	5:36
5.	"He's Moving On"	4:38

7" Vinyl
No.	Title	Length
1.	"Frozen Heart"	4:29
2.	"He's Moving On"	4:38

== Personnel ==
All personnel credits adapted from the EP's sleeve notes.

- All songs written by Smoke Fairies
- Artwork created by Smoke Fairies
- Bass/Percussion/Piano – Leo Abrahams (Track 2)
- Double Bass – Al Mobbs (Tracks 1 and 3), Tim Harries (Track 5)
- Drums – Andy Newmark (Tracks 1 and 3)
- Guitars and vocals – Smoke Fairies
- Hurdy Gurdy – Leo Abrahams (Tracks 1 and 4)
- Percussion – Leo Abrahams (Track 4)
- Viola – Neil Walsh (Track 1), Una Palliser (Track 5)
- Tracks 2, 4 and 5 – Produced, recorded and mixed by Leo Abrahams for Solar Management.
- Tracks 2, 4 and 5 – Recorded at Cafe Music, Bow, London
- Tracks 1 and 3 – Produced by David Coulter. Recorded and mixed by Tom Dalgety.
- Tracks 1 and 3 – Recorded at Miloco Studios, 'The Square', Hoxton, London. Mixed at The Yard, London.
