= Peanut Butter Blues & Melancholy Jam =

Studio album by Ghostpoet
- Released: 4 February 2011
- Recorded: Redbull Music Academy studios and The Brownswood Basement
- Genre: Electronica; trip hop; UK rap; future garage; experimental hip-hop
- Length: 41:11
- Label: Brownswood
- Producer: Ghostpoet

Ghostpoet chronology
The Sound of Strangers (2010)	Peanut Butter Blues & Melancholy Jam (2011)	Some Say I So I Say Light (2013)

Singles from Peanut Butter Blues & Melancholy Jam
- 1. "Cash and Carry Me Home" Released: January 23, 2011; 2. "Survive It" Released: May 6, 2011; 3. "Liiines" Released: September 2, 2011

Professional ratings
Review scores
Source	Rating
Allmusic	4/5 stars
Lesson Six	4/5 stars

Peanut Butter Blues & Melancholy Jam is the debut album of British singer, songwriter and musician Ghostpoet. It was released worldwide on 4 February 2011 on Gilles Peterson's label Brownswood Recordings. The album was shortlisted for the 2011 Mercury Prize, but lost to Let England Shake by PJ Harvey.

== Reception ==
Upon its release, Peanut Butter Blues & Melancholy Jam received generally good reviews from music critics. The website Metacritic gives the album an aggregated score of 78/100 while, and as of July 2011, Amazon ranks it at 18 in their list of the top 50 most acclaimed albums of the year so far. Most reviews, both positive and negative, emphasized the engaging nature of the music; Zachary Houle of Pop Matters praised the sound for being "compelling in its own audacity." Adam Kennedy of the BBC stated that "rarely does a British debut album forge such a fully formed, genuinely unique direction", adding, that the album "throws its headgear into the ring as an early contender for 2011's finest out-of-leftfield long-players". Some reviews were more mixed, however; American magazine CMJ noted the challenging nature of the music, saying that the songs "barely step out of the realm of down-tempo trip hop genre pioneered by his countrymen Massive Attack," but added that, "Ghostpoet shows that he is close to mastering it."

== Track listing ==
All songs written and produced by Ghostpoet.

No.	Title	Length
1.	"Onetwos"	0:40
2.	"Run Run Run"	3:19
3.	"Us Against Whatever Ever"	4:28
4.	"Finished I Ain't"	4:19
5.	"Longing for the Night"	3:34
6.	"Yeah Pause"	0:17
7.	"I Just Don't Know"	3:36
8.	"Survive It" (featuring Fabiana Palladino)	4:21
9.	"Gaaasp"	5:27
10.	"Cash and Carry Me Home"	3:35
11.	"Garden Path"	2:49
12.	"Liiines"	4:51

- Note: Some editions of the album combine "Onetwos" with "Run Run Run", and "Longing for the Night" with "Yeah Pause" respectively.

== Personnel ==
According to the album's liner notes:

- Ghostpoet - Vocals, writing and production
- Florian Sauvaire - Drums on "Finished I Ain't", "I Just Don't Know" and "Liiines", additional production
- Chris Lockington - Guitar on "Finished I Ain't", "I Just Don't Know" and "Liiines", additional production
- Fabiana Palladino - Vocals on "Survive It"
- Ian "Ean" Carter - Mixing, guitar on "Finished I Ain't" and "Liiines", bass on "Liiines", additional production, recording
- Brendon "Octave" Harding - Recording, additional production
- Stuart Hawkes - Mastering
- Nigel R Glasgow - Additional production
- Mischa Ritcher - Photography
- Teddy George-Poku - Styling
- Ana Pryor - Graphics
