= I Grow Tired but Dare Not Fall Asleep =

I Grow Tired But Dare Not Fall Asleep

Studio album by Ghostpoet
- Released: 1 May 2020
- Genres: Art pop; art rock; post-punk; trip-hop; UK rap; spoken word
- Length: 45:38
- Label: PIAS

Ghostpoet chronology
Dark Days + Canapés (2017)	I Grow Tired But Dare Not Fall Asleep (2020)

Professional ratings
Aggregate scores
Source	Rating
AnyDecentMusic?	7.4/10
Metacritic	79/100
Review scores
Source	Rating
AllMusic	4/5 stars
Clash	8/10
DIY	4/5 stars
Gigwise	9/10
The Guardian	3/5 stars
The Line of Best Fit	8.5/10
Loud and Quiet	8/10
Louder Than War	8/10
MusicOMH	3.5/5 stars
NME	3/5 stars

I Grow Tired But Dare Not Fall Asleep is the fifth studio album by British musician Ghostpoet. It was released 1 May 2020 under PIAS Recordings.

== Promotion ==
=== Singles ===
"Concrete Pony" was released as the first single from the album on 29 January 2020. The second single "Nowhere To Hide Now" was released 7 April 2020.

== Critical reception ==
I Grow Tired But Dare Not Fall Asleep was met with generally favourable reviews from critics. At Metacritic, which assigns a weighted average rating out of 100 to reviews from mainstream publications, this release received an average score of 79, based on 12 reviews.

== Track listing ==
I Grow Tired But Dare Not Fall Asleep track listing
No.	Title	Length
1.	"Breaking Cover"	6:31
2.	"Concrete Pony"	4:06
3.	"Humana Second Hand"	3:55
4.	"Black Dog Got Silver Eyes"	4:02
5.	"Rats In A Sack"	3:39
6.	"This Train Wreck Of A Life"	4:06
7.	"Nowhere To Hide Now"	4:35
8.	"When Mouths Collide"	4:26
9.	"I Grow Tired But Dare Not Fall Asleep"	4:35
10.	"Social Lacerations"	5:43

== Charts ==
Chart performance for I Grow Tired But Dare Not Fall Asleep
Chart (2020)	Peak position
Scottish Albums (Official Charts)	16
UK Independent Albums (Official Charts)	8
