= Dark Days + Canapés =

Studio album by Ghostpoet
- Released: 18 August 2017
- Genres: Alt-rock; art pop; experimental rock; electronica; spoken word
- Length: 44:27
- Label: Play It Again Sam
- Producer: Leo Abrahams

Ghostpoet chronology
Shedding Skin (2015)	Dark Days + Canapés (2017)	I Grow Tired but Dare Not Fall Asleep (2020)

Dark Days + Canapés is the fourth album by British vocalist and musician Ghostpoet.

Described as a standout track, the first single from the album, "Immigrant Boogie", was released in April 2017. Three more songs, "Trouble + Me", "Freakshow" and "Dopamine If I Do", were also released prior to the album. Music videos were released for "Immigrant Boogie" and "Freakshow". It was produced by Leo Abrahams and mixed by Abrahams and Kristofer Harris. "Woe Is Meee" was the second collaboration of Ghostpoet and Daddy G. In an email to The Fader, Ghostpoet said "I wrote this one for the struggling minds, trying to make sense of an ever-increasingly technologically connected, but lonesome world."

== Reception ==
=== Commercial performance ===
In the UK Albums Chart charting week of August 31, 2017, Dark Days + Canapés was the No. 37 album upon its first week of release according to the Official Charts Company. It marks the highest position achieved by a Ghostpoet album as well as the first time that one of his albums had ranked within the top 40 based on domestic sales.

=== Critical reception ===
Professional ratings
Aggregate scores
Source	Rating
Metacritic	79/100
Review scores
Source	Rating
AllMusic	4/5 stars
Clash	8/10
The Guardian	3/5 stars
The Independent	5/5 stars
The Line of Best Fit	7/10
Mojo	4/5 stars
The Observer	4/5 stars

Dark Days + Canapés was well received upon released by contemporary music critics. The review aggregator Metacritic gave the album a weighted score of 79 out of 100, indicating "generally favourable" reviews.

Harriet Gibsone in The Guardian gave the album 3 out of 5 stars, stating that it was "exhaustingly bleak" and compared "Trouble + Me" to Radiohead's "Street Spirit". Isa Jaward of The Observer gave the album 4 out of 5 stars, concluding Ghostpoet was "now at home in this [alt-rock] style and his languid, sung-spoken monologues sound their most assured." Reviewing the album for The Line of Best Fit, Joe Goggins concluded that "Ejimiwe is on positively caustic form at points, not least when he rails against modern relationships and consumerism on 'Freakshow' and frets about self-medication on closer 'End Times'. His languid delivery belies the very real anxieties that Dark Days + Canapés is scored through with, but the nervy sonic backing absolutely serves to accentuate them; what that leaves us with is an album that's more about personal politics than global ones, but that still feels scored through with the suffocating disquiet of life in 2017."

In Clash, critic Robin Murray described the album as "boasting a rare sense of unity" with "the aural palette bringing together hugely disparate elements to conjure something of real impact." Andy Gill of The Independent rated the album 5 out of 5, describing it as a "great album that bodes well for Ghostpoet's future." In the review from AllMusic, Andy Kellman was also positive in his assessment, stating, "Rest assured, everything else on the two-time Mercury Prize nominee's fourth Ghostpoet album throbs and churns with grim, gripping realism. Parts of Dark Days + Canapés are so bleak in spirit that they sound as if they were recorded in a sweatbox built inside a slag heap."

== Track listing ==
All tracks are written by Obaro Ejimiwe, except where noted

Dark Days + Canapés
No.	Title	Music	Length
1.	"One More Sip"		1:32
2.	"Many Moods at Midnight"	Obaro Ejimiwe; Leo Abrahams	4:00
3.	"Trouble + Me"		4:53
4.	"(We're) Dominoes"	Ejimiwe; Abrahams	4:20
5.	"Freakshow"		4:05
6.	"Dopamine If I Do" (featuring EERA)	Ejimiwe; Abrahams	3:39
7.	"Live>Leave"		3:48
8.	"Karoshi"		3:13
9.	"Blind as a Bat..."		4:38
10.	"Immigrant Boogie"		2:39
11.	"Woe Is Meee" (featuring Daddy G)	Ejimiwe; Grant Marshall	4:07
12.	"End Times"		3:33
Total length:			44:27

== Charts ==
Chart (2017)	Peak position
Belgian Albums (Ultratop Flanders)	84
Scottish Albums (Official Charts)	42
UK Albums (Official Charts)	39
