= Smoke Fairies =

British rock band

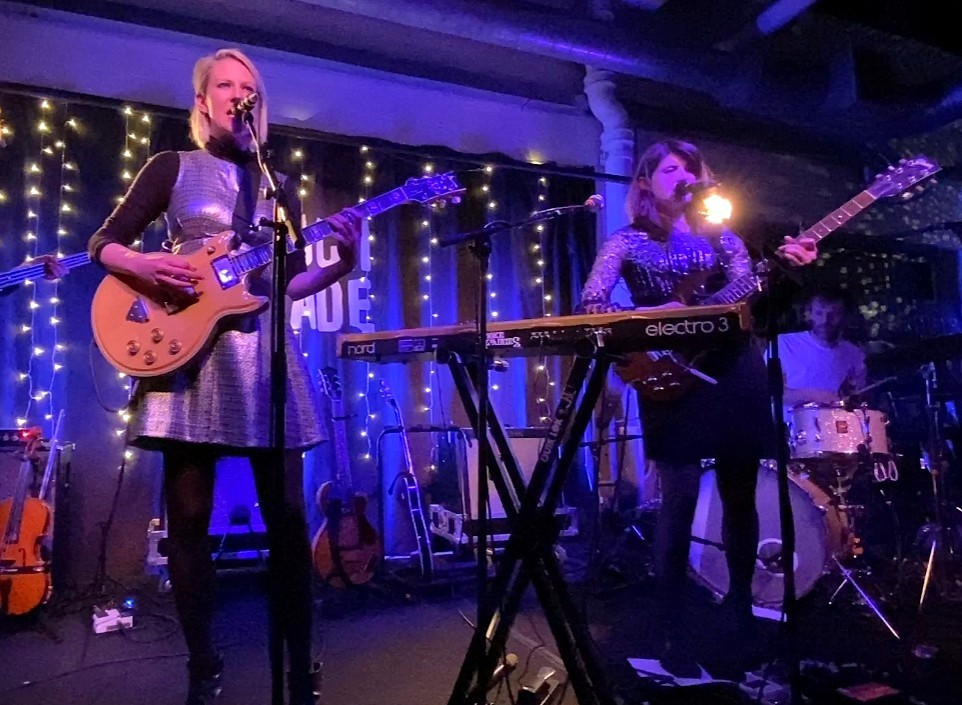
- Jessica Davies (left) Katherine Blamire (right) at Rough Trade East, December 2023

Background information
- Origin: Chichester, England
- Genres: Alternative, Blues, Indie rock, Folk rock
- Instruments: Vocals, guitars, piano, viola, keyboards, percussion
- Years active: 2005–present
- Labels: Full Time Hobby, V2, Third Man Records, Music For Heroes Records, Year Seven Records
- Members: Katherine Blamire; Jessica Davies
- Website: smokefairies.com

Smoke Fairies (Katherine Blamire and Jessica Davies) are a British rock band hailing from Chichester.

Logo and Band name

"It came to us one night when we were driving around in the misty roads where we grew up. Sometimes the mist gathers in the winding roads between the hedgerows and creates smoky figures that we called the smoke fairies. It's also an old black and white film about two mischievous fairies trying to cause trouble, which is also quite fitting"

— Smoke Fairies: Interview with Quail Bell Magazine, 2011

== History ==
Blamire and Davies met at school in Sussex during the late 1990s. As best friends, they wrote songs and performed in school shows and competitions. Playing under the name Superhighway, they experimented with a variety of instruments, from guitars to piano to percussion, recording their early sounds themselves at home. Evolving into Smoke Fairies, they spent 2002 in New Orleans, where they absorbed American blues music. When they returned to England they discovered British folk music at the Sidmouth Folk Week Festival while working as car park attendants. They later settled in Vancouver, British Columbia, Canada, for a year before returning to London to start writing and performing.

Blamire and Davies contribute equally to song writing and generally sing lead vocal on their own compositions. However, as the harmonies and arrangements are worked on together, the songs are always credited as being written by Smoke Fairies.

=== 2005-2009: Early Music ===
Smoke Fairies released their first record, Strange the Things, in 2005, however this was not widely promoted by the band. In 2007, Smoke Fairies toured the UK in support of Bryan Ferry and the following year they released their debut single, "Living with Ghosts", on Music for Heroes. Richard Hawley was an early supporter of the act, saying they were "frankly the best thing I have heard in years". They supported Hawley on his Truelove's Gutter Tour of the UK in October 2009.

In December 2009, Smoke Fairies became the first UK act to release a single on Jack White's label Third Man Records. The double A-side single, "Gastown" / "River Song", was produced by Jack White who also played guitar and drums. Smoke Fairies performed at the 2010 South by South West (SXSW) festival in Texas and supported Laura Marling on a month-long tour of the United States.

=== 2010-2012: Ghosts, Through Low Light And Trees, Blood Speaks ===
In 2010, the compilation album Ghosts was released, featuring singles and previously unreleased songs. The band signed to V2 Records/Cooperative Music and released their debut album Through Low Light and Trees in September 2010, latterly self-released in the United States in June 2011 via Year Seven Records. The album was produced by long-term PJ Harvey collaborator Head and recorded at Sawmills Studio in Cornwall, United Kingdom.

To promote the album the band was invited to record a live session for Marc Riley on BBC Radio 6, and was invited back for another session a few months later. The duo also recorded a live session with their band for John Kennedy's "X-Posure" on XFM. In November 2010, Smoke Fairies' recording of Neil Young's "Alabama" appeared on a special Mojo album to mark the approaching fortieth anniversary of Young's Harvest LP.

The band embarked on its first headline tour of the UK – a sell-out – in January–February 2011 and performed at several festivals that summer, including Primavera Sound in Barcelona. Before heading to the United States in June 2011 to perform at North by Northeast Festival and their own headline shows, returning again in August 2011 Jessica & Katherine toured the U.S. with Rasputina. Smoke Fairies again returned to the US in October to play support for Blitzen Trapper and Dawes making their second coast-to-coast tour of the year.

Smoke Fairies' follow-up album, Blood Speaks, was released on 21 May 2012, again with a delayed release in the US of 23 April 2013. Again produced by Head Blood Speaks was this time recorded in West London's Eastcote Studio and is inspired by London and by travelling. Pitchfork rated the album 7.2 remarking that Jessica and Katherine "don't trade vocal duties so much as appear to sing from the same body".

=== 2013-2015: Smoke Fairies, Wild Winter, Live at St. Pancras Old Church ===
In 2013, Smoke Fairies signed with Full Time Hobby records and released their self-titled album Smoke Fairies on 14 April 2014. The album spawned singles Eclipse Them All, We've Seen Birds and Shadow Inversions. It was produced by Kristofer Harris at Squarehead Studios in Kent. Well received, The Quietus called the record "brilliantly immersive" and suggested the band were "starting to approach the very English singularity of Her Holiness Kate Bush". On the same theme Mojo magazine chose the album track "Your Own Silent Movie" to feature on their compilation The Dreamers – 15 Tracks of Kate Bush-Inspired Dream Pop.

An ‘Instrumentals’ CD, originally released as a bonus disc to the Smoke Fairies 2014 LP, was provided as part of a Rough Trade exclusive bundle. It featured five tracks from the album, recorded as instrumentals. The CD was then sold separately on their UK tour as a tour special in 2014.

Later that year the band recorded their winter themed album Wild Winter, which was available exclusively in Rough Trade shops for Christmas 2014. The following Christmas saw a full worldwide release and the album received praise from the New York Times and The Guardian. Wild Winter was again produced by Kristofer Harris. The album inspired a beer brewed under the same name by the London brewery Signature Brew.

Jessica and Katherine also contributed vocals to the track "Valentina", a tribute to Valentina Tereshkova—the first woman in space—on The Race For Space, the second album by Public Service Broadcasting. Smoke Fairies toured the UK supporting and performing with Public Service Broadcasting in 2015. It was preceded by the self-released Live at St Pancras Old Church, featuring Rasputina, which had been recorded 2 years earlier.

=== 2019-2020: Darkness Brings the Wonders Home, Smoke Signals pod cast ===
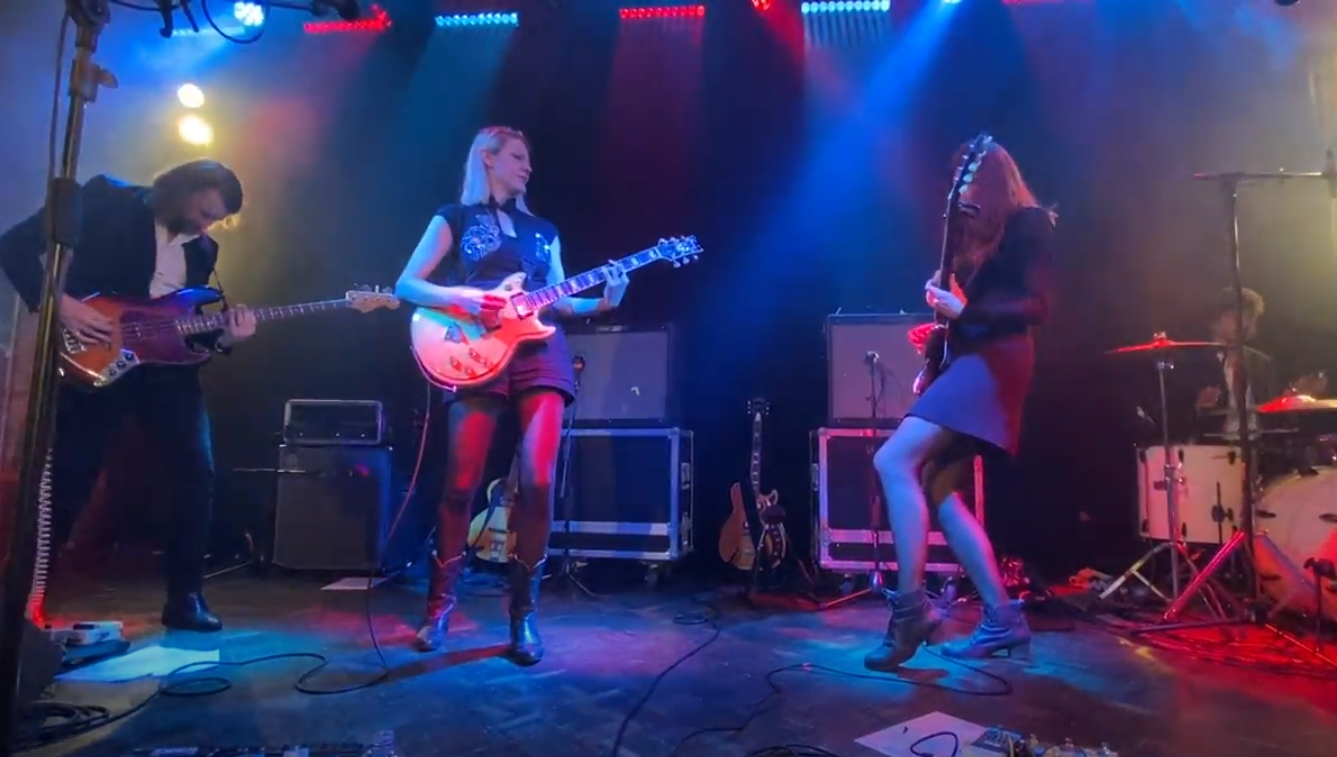
Darkness Brings The Wonders Home tour, Lafayette, London, February 2022

In August 2019, the band announced their return with a video for the track "Out of the Woods", produced by Phil Ek. Louder Than War described the track as "dark, stark, skeletal blues". On 25 September 2019, the band announced the album, Darkness Brings the Wonders Home, also produced by Ek, which was released on 31 January 2020. During the promotion for the new record Davies and Blamire launched the podcast Smoke Signals, a humorous insight into their musical journey and the music industry. The podcast's second series was launched a year later, and ranked highly with Apple Podcasts having a 4.9 out of 5 rating.

Released on the band's own label Year Seven Records, Darkness Brings the Wonders Home charted the band #1 in the UK Indie Breakers Chart, a #1 in the UK Rock & Metal Albums Chart and a Top 10 UK Independent Album. The band toured the UK with the album in January and February 2020 with John J. Presley and Sean Fallowfield.

The single "Elevator" taken from the album was released on limited edition 7-inch picture-disc during the UK's coronavirus lock-down in April 2020 gaining them more number one chart placings. A #1 in the UK Physical Singles Chart and a #1 in the UK Vinyl Singles Chart. During the pandemic Davies and Blamire live-streamed three performances via their facebook page raising over £2000 for chosen charities The Red Cross, RSPCA and Emmaus UK.

=== 2022-present: Singles, Carried In Sound, Wild Winter (re-release) ===
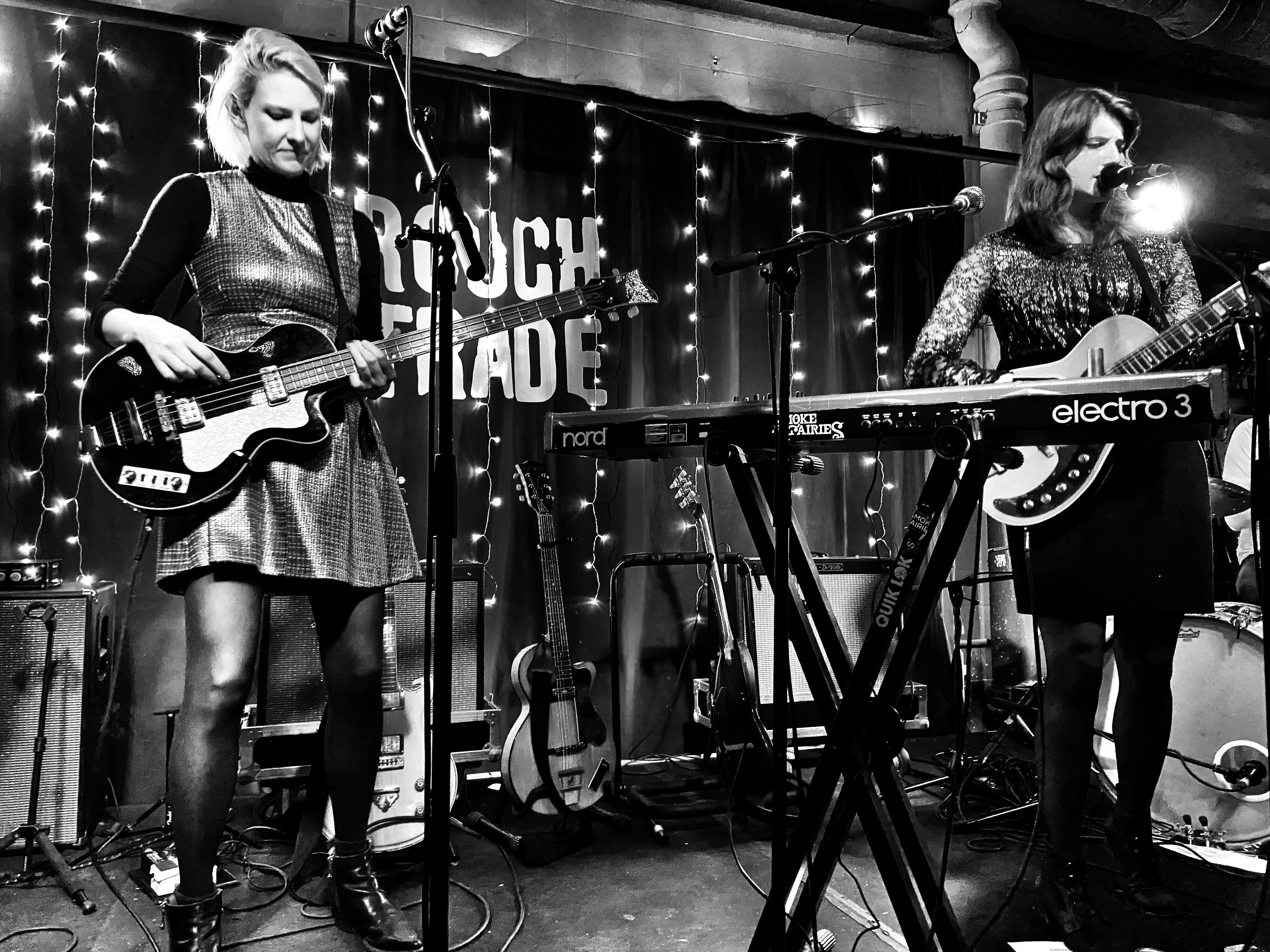
Live at Rough Trade East, December 2023

On 4 November 2022, the band released a compilation album Singles, reaching #2 in the Official Independent Album Breakers Chart. The collection of 18 official singles was released on Year Seven Records and available as a double-LP and CD, with signed, limited edition variants. The release was followed by a one-night-only performance of the entire album at Omeara, London, on 7 November 2022.

"Sticks and Stones"
Recorded live at Rough Trade East, December 2023

The band's sixth studio album, Carried in Sound, was released on 17 November 2023 and reached #3 in the Official Independent Album Breakers Chart. The record was self-recorded and self-released on the band's Year Seven label, available in blue or orange vinyl and CD versions. In the run-up to the release, the band shared several stripped-back performances and works in progress, and discussed their inspirations on social media and their Patreon site. A music video to accompany the first single, "Vanishing Line" was announced in September 2023, filmed in the Essex countryside.

To promote Carried In Sound, the band, together with multi-instrumentalists Neil Walsh (Viola) and Rob Wilks (Drums), embarked on a five-date sell-out tour across the UK. In addition, the band performed several in-store record signing gigs.

On 13 December 2024, to mark the 10th anniversary of their album Wild Winter, the band re-released the record with revised artwork, together with a re-brewing of its Wild Winter beer, available on a two-night tour in Hastings and London.

In early 2025, Smoke Fairies supported New Zealand band, The Veils, for six nights of their European tour. In August 2025, the duo played a set at the Compton Festival in Sussex and in October of the same year provided a musical introduction to the Wordsworth lecture at the British Library in London.

In September 2026, Public Service Broadcasting invited Smoke Fairies to perform "Valentina" as part of the 10th Anniversary celebration of their album The Race For Space, at Alexandra Palace in London.

== Discography ==
=== Studio albums ===
- Through Low Light and Trees (2010)
- Blood Speaks (2012)
- Smoke Fairies (2014)
- Wild Winter (2014)
- Darkness Brings the Wonders Home (2020)
- Carried in Sound (2023)

=== Compilations and other albums ===
- Strange the Things (2005)
- Ghosts (2010)
- Live at St Pancras Old Church (2015)
- Singles (2022)

=== EPs ===
- Frozen Heart (2009)
- The Three of Us – "The Three Of Us", "Radio Clicks On", "Bells", "The Wireless" – 9-inch vinyl, limited edition of 500 (V2 / Cooperative Music) & 2 x 7-inch vinyl, limited edition of 1000 (453 Music, USA, Record Store Day, 2012)
- This Is A Reflection – A collection of covers – "Do I Need You", "Wish You Well", "She Sells Sanctuary", "The Visitor", "Requiem" – 12-inch vinyl & CD exclusive to Rough Trade Shops (V2 / Cooperative Music, 2012)
- Upstairs at United, Vol. 6, recorded 17 October 2011 – "Phone Line", "The Water Waits", "Dancing Light", " Wake You Up", "Good Man" – 12-inch vinyl (453 Music - Record Store Day, 2013)
- Instrumentals - Sing along bonus CD – "Misty Versions", "Koto", "Eclipse Them All", "Hope Is Religion", "The Very Last Time" - (Full Time Hobby, 14 April 2014)
- Sticks and Stones – "Sticks and Stones", "Come to my Mind", Part of it All" – Digital release (Year Seven Records, 2 December 2022)

=== Singles ===
- "Living with Ghosts" / "Troubles" – 7-inch limited edition of 500 (Music for Heroes Records, August 2008)
- "Frozen Heart" – CD promo (Music For Heroes Records, 13 July 2009)
- "Sunshine" / "When you Grow Old" – 7-inch limited edition of 1000 (Music for Heroes Records, October 2009)
- "Gastown" / "River Song" – Double A-side, 7-inch limited edition of 150 on tri-colored vinyl; Texas-sized 8" limited edition (Third Man Records, September 2009)
- "Hotel Room" / "Human Concerns" – 7-inch limited edition of 300 (V2 / Cooperative Music, 2010)
- "Strange Moon Rising" / "Requiem" – 7-inch limited edition of 500 (V2 / Cooperative Music, 24 January 2011)
- "Strange Moon Rising (radio edit)" / "Alabama" – 7-inch limited edition on white vinyl, UK tour edition (V2 / Cooperative Music, 24 January 2011)
- "Hotel Room" / "Strange Moon Rising" – 7-inch limited edition of 500 on blue-marbled vinyl (453 Music, World Record Store Day, 16 April 2011)
- "Storm Song" / "Storm Song Demo" – 7-inch limited edition of 500 (V2 / Cooperative Music, 16 May 2011)
- "The Three of Us" – CD (V2, 2012)
- "Let Me Know" / "Film Reel - Remix" – 7-inch limited edition of 300 (V2 / Cooperative Music, 2012)
- "Simple Feeling" / "I Wonder As I Wander" – 7-inch limited edition of 500 (Snowflake Singles Club, 2 Dec 2013)
- "Eclipse Them All" – digital release (Full Time Hobby, 2014)
- "We've Seen Birds" / "Monochrome Days" – 7-inch limited edition of 500 (Full Time Hobby, 2014)
- "Shadow Inversions" – CD promo (Full Time Hobby, 2014)
- "Christmas Without A Kiss" – Digital release (Full Time Hobby, Dec 2014)
- "Out of the Woods / Disconnect" – Double A-Side, 7-inch limited edition of 300 picture disc (Year Seven Records – exclusive to Rough Trade Shops, 2019)
- "Elevator" / "Les Fleur" – 7-inch limited edition of 300 picture disc (Year Seven Records, 2020)
- "No Matter How This Goes, Just Make Sure That You're Kind" – digital release (Year Seven Records,15 April 2020)
- "There Was a Hope" - Digital release (Year Seven Records, 12 May 2023)
- "Vanishing Line" - Digital release (Year Seven Records, 19 September 2023)
- "Seek it With Me" – Digital release (Year Seven Records, 25 October 2023)

== Videos ==
Official videos, published on Smoke Fairies YouTube channel)

- Living With Ghosts - July 2008
- Frozen Heart - July 2009
- Hotel Room - October 2010
- Strange Moon Rising - January 2011
- The Three Of Us - March 2012
- Let Me Know - August 2012
- Upstairs At United - April 2013
- We've Seen Birds - March 2014
- Shadow Inversions - June 2014
- 3 Kings - December 2014
- Christmas Without A Kiss - December 2015
- Out Of The Woods - Aug 2019
- Disconnect - November 2019
- Elevator - March 2020
- River Song - September 2022
- Gastown - November 2022
- Vanishing Line - September 2023

== Anthologies ==
- "Good Man" on Live at the Electroacoustic Club, Vol. 2 (Running Jump Records, 13 November 2006)
- "Troubles" on What's Kickin', Vol. 2 (Stovepony Records, 14 May 2007)
- "Troubles" on Shivering Sands and Scavenging Birds (Thames Delta Recording Co., 14 October 2009)
- "Frozen Heart" on Now Hear This! - Hand-Picked By The Word (Word Magazine, October 2009)
- "Strange Moon Rising" on Ones to Watch 2011 (Classic Rock Magazine, 2010)
- "Hotel Room" on The Residential Sweetener 2 (Republic Of Music/Resident, 2010)
- "Hotel Room" on October Revolution Sampler 2010 (Chrysalis Music, 2010)
- "Hotel Room" on Republic Of Music Presents... (Republic Of Music, 2010)
- "Strange Moon Rising" on Half A Decade Of Being Half-Cut (Release The Hounds, 2011)
- "Storm Song" on Rough Trade - Counter Culture 10 (Promotional CD issued by Rough Trade, February 2011)
- "The Three Of Us" on Piccadilly Records 2012 Sampler (Republic Of Music, 2012)
- "She Sells Sanctuary" on The Residential Sweetener 4 (Republic Of Music/Resident, 2012)
- "Eclipse Them All" on What The Hell Are You Doing? Full Time Hobby 10th Anniversary (Full Time Hobby, 2014)
- "Your Own Silent Movie" on One For The Road - Uncut's Guide To The Best New Music (Uncut, April 2014)
- "Your Own Silent Movie" on The Dreamers (Kate Bush Inspired Dream Pop, Mojo Magazine, October 2014)
- "All Up In The Air" on Efflorescent - Echoes Live 22 (Echodiscs, 2016)
- "We've Seen Birds" on Jimmy Sings The Hits, Yngdave Plays The Licks! (WFMU, 2016)
- "Out Of The Woods" on Resident Annual 2019 - Sampler #12 (Republic Of Music, 2019)
- "Disconnect" on Piccadilly Records Sampler 2020 (Piccadilly Records, 2020)

== Guest appearances/credits ==
- Backing vocals on Duke Special's - Huckleberry Finn EP (Reel to Reel, 2009)
- Backing vocals on "Once", the B side of Kid Harpoon's vinyl single Back From Beyond (Young Turks, October 2009)
- Vocals and guitars on "It's Over" from Roy Orbison - Under the Covers - compilation album (Orbison Records, 2009)
- Backing vocals on "Shallow Brown" and "The Ellan Vannin Tragedy" from Richard Hawley's EP False Lights from the Land (Mute Records, 7 June 2010)
- Vocals and guitars on "Alabama" from Harvest Revisited (Promotional CD issued with Mojo Magazine, January 2011)
- Backing vocals on "Fencebuilding" from Rob Marr's album Anatomy (Rob Marr, 2012)
- Vocals on "If I Were A Carpenter" from Reasons to Believe - The Songs of Tim Hardin - compilation album, (Full Time Hobby, 20 April 2013)
- Vocals on "Valentina" from Public Service Broadcasting's album The Race for Space (Test Card Recordings, 2015)
- Backing vocals on "Sonny Boogie", "Blue" and "Coldblooded the Return" from Duke Garwood's album Garden of Ashes (Heavenly Recordings, 2017)
- Backing vocals on The Veils' ....And Out of the Void Came Love album (Da Da Bing!, 2023)
