= Shedding Skin =

Studio album by Ghostpoet
- Released: 2 March 2015
- Genre: Trip-hop; post-punk revival; UK rap; art pop; alt-rock; electronica
- Length: 43:21
- Label: Play It Again Sam
- Producer: John Calvert; Ghostpoet

Ghostpoet chronology
Some Say I So I Say Light (2013)	Shedding Skin (2015)	Dark Days + Canapés (2017)

Shedding Skin is the third album by British singer, songwriter and musician Ghostpoet. The album was nominated for the 2015 Mercury Music Prize.

== Track listing ==
No.	Title	Length
1.	"Off Peak Dreams"	3:18
2.	"X Marks The Spot" (featuring Nadine Shah)	3:50
3.	"Be Right Back, Moving House" (featuring Paul Smith)	6:06
4.	"Shedding Skin" (featuring Melanie De Biasio)	4:24
5.	"Yes, I Helped You Pack" (featuring Etta Bond)	3:51
6.	"That Ring Down The Drain Kind Of Feeling" (featuring Nadine Shah)	3:50
7.	"Sorry My Love, It's You Not Me"	4:11
8.	"Better Not Butter"	4:13
9.	"The Pleasure In Pleather"	3:27
10.	"Nothing In The Way"	6:11
