= Kristofer Harris =

- Born: London, England
- Occupation(s): Record producer, mixer, musician
- Website: kristoferharris.co.uk

Kristofer Harris is an English record producer, mixer and writer. He is most noted for his work with Belle and Sebastian, Ghostpoet, Smoke Fairies, Clock Opera and Bear's Den.

== Biography ==
Kristofer Harris grew up in Kent, United Kingdom, and began his musical career playing in his own bands Tourist and Story Books and also contributed as session musician on tours with Laura Marling, Smoke Fairies and Sea of Bees.

In 2017 Harris mixed a series of singles for Scottish band Belle and Sebastian released in early 2018 on Matador Records. He co-mixed the Ghostpoet album "Dark Days + Canapés" released in 2017 on PIAS Recordings, contributed production to the Bears Den album "Islands" on Communion Records having worked closely with the band on the early "Agape" EP. He co-produced and mixed "Venn" the second album for Clock Opera on !K7 Records, co-produced and mixed the "Other Rivers" album for Matthew and The Atlas also on Communion Records and produced and mixed two albums for the UK band Smoke Fairies; their self-titled "Smoke Fairies" album and also "Wild Winter" which were released on Full Time Hobby Records.

In 2017 Harris mixed and additionally-produced the debut album of Belgian band VRWRK "On The Outside" for Universal Music and produced and mixed tracks for White Room's "Eight" release via Deltasonic Records.

== Credits ==
Artists Kristofer has worked with include:

- Bears Den
- Belle and Sebastian
- Clock Opera
- Diagrams
- Emmy The Great
- Ghostpoet
- Indoor Pets
- King No-One
- Matthew and the Atlas
- Monika Linkytė
- Nimmo
- NZCA Lines
- Rachel K Collier
- Smoke Fairies
- Story Books
- VRWRK
- Milan André Boronell
- Chris Noah
- Saya Gray
