= Jon Hopkins discography =

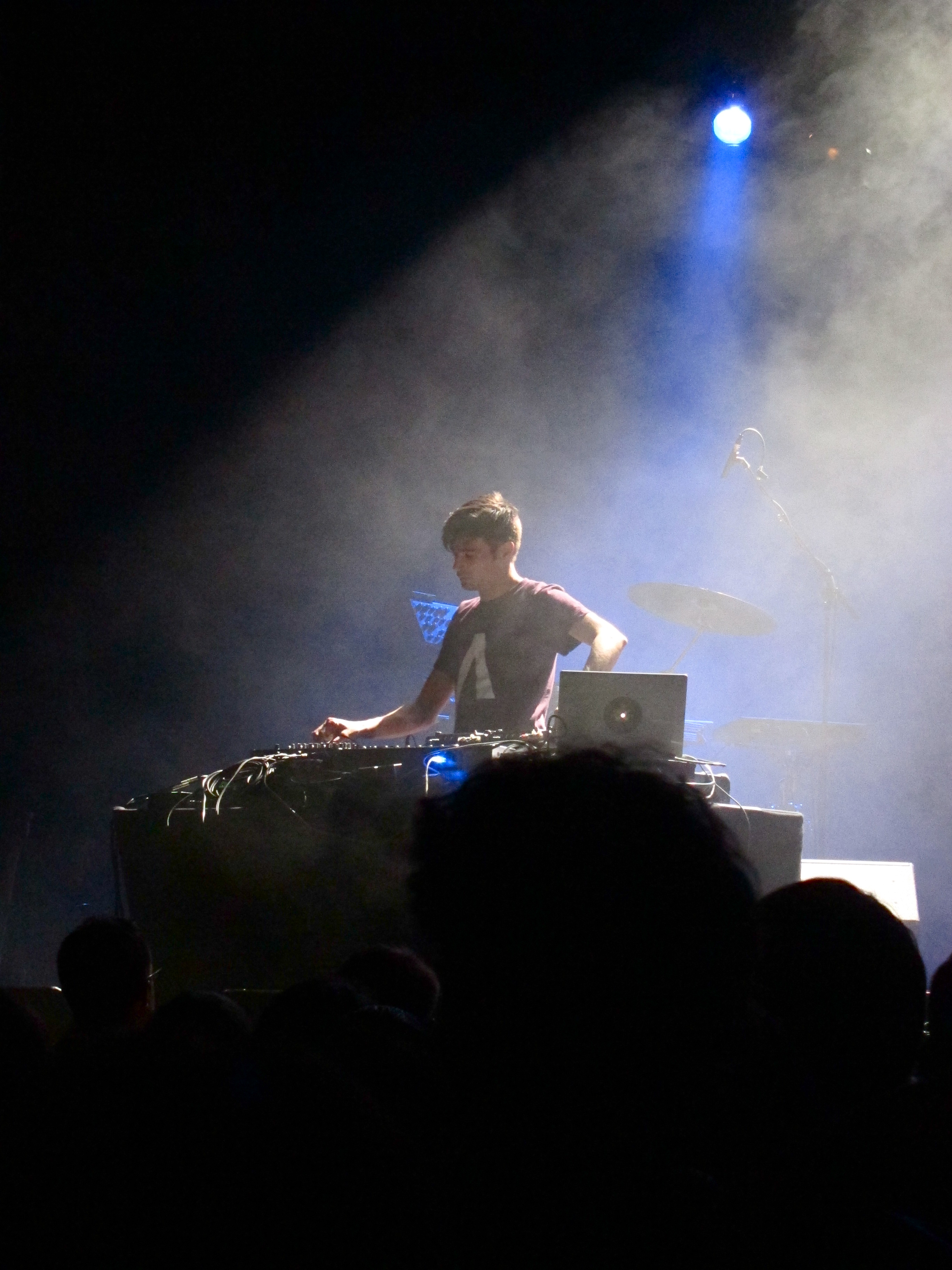
- Jon Hopkins in 2011
- Studio albums: 9
- EPs: 8
- Soundtrack albums: 3
- Compilation albums: 2
- Singles: 32

The following is a comprehensive discography of English musician and producer Jon Hopkins. His discography comprises nine studio albums (seven solo), three soundtrack albums, two compilation albums, eight extended plays, thirty-two singles and twenty-eight remixes.

== Albums ==
=== Studio albums ===
Title	Information	Peak chart positions									
Title	Information	UK	AUS	BEL (FL)	GER	IRE	NED	SWI	UK Dance	US Dance	US Ind.
Opalescent	Released: 30 July 2001; Label: Just Music; Formats: CD, digital download, vinyl	—	—	—	—	—	—	—	—	—	—
Contact Note	Released: 9 August 2004; Label: Just Music; Formats: CD, digital download	—	—	—	—	—	—	—	—	—	—
Insides	Released: 5 May 2009; Label: Domino; Formats: CD, digital download, vinyl	—	—	—	—	—	—	—	—	15	—
Immunity	Released: 3 June 2013; Label: Domino; Formats: CD, digital download, vinyl	63	—	64	—	45	—	—	12	13	—
Singularity	Released: 4 May 2018; Label: Domino; Formats: CD, digital download, vinyl	9	44	11	31	21	56	21	1	11	18
Music for Psychedelic Therapy	Released: 12 November 2021; Label: Domino; Formats: CD, digital download, vinyl	—	—	145	72	—	—	—	—	—	—
Ritual	Released: 30 August 2024; Label: Domino; Formats: Digital download, streaming	51	—	72	—	—	92	—	—	—	—
"—" denotes a recording that did not chart or was not released in that territory.

=== Collaborative albums ===
Title	Information	Peak chart positions				
Title	Information	UK	US	UK Ind.	US Dance	US Ind.
Small Craft on a Milk Sea (with Brian Eno and Leo Abrahams)	Released: 19 October 2010; Label: Warp; Formats: CD, digital download, vinyl	82	84	6	2	9
Diamond Mine (with King Creosote)	Released: 28 March 2011; Label: Domino; Formats: CD, digital download, vinyl	82	—	20	—	—
"—" denotes a recording that did not chart or was not released in that territory.

=== Soundtrack albums ===
Title	Information
Monsters	Released: 29 November 2010; Label: Domino; Formats: CD, digital download
How I Live Now	Released: 14 October 2013; Label: Just Music; Formats: CD, digital download
Wilding (with Biggi Hilmars)	Released: 16 January 2026; Label: Domino; Formats: LP, CD, digital download

=== Compilation albums ===
Title	Information
The Art of Chill 2	Released: 9 September 2005; Label: Platipus; Formats: CD
Late Night Tales: Jon Hopkins	Released: 2 March 2015; Label: Late Night Tales; Formats: CD, digital download, vinyl

== Extended plays ==
Title	Information
EP1	Released: 21 November 2005; Label: Just Music; Formats: CD
10x10:02 (with Reuben Taylor)	Released: 30 November 2006; Label: De-Fence; Formats: CD
The Fourth State	Released: 17 April 2008; Label: Sounds Asleep; Formats: CD
Seven Gulps of Air	Released: 10 November 2009; Label: Double Six; Formats: CD, digital download
Honest Words (with King Creosote)	Released: 19 September 2011; Label: Domino, Double Six; Formats: Digital download, vinyl
Asleep Versions	Released: 10 November 2014; Label: Domino; Formats: CD, digital download, vinyl
The Jubilee (with King Creosote)	Released: 17 April 2012; Label: Domino, Double Six; Formats: Digital download, vinyl
Piano Versions	Released: 2 July 2022; Label: Domino; Formats: CD, digital download, vinyl

== Singles ==
Title	Year	Album
"Light Through the Veins"	2009	Insides
"Jon Hopkins Remixes"	2009	Insides
"Bubble" (with King Creosote)	2011	Diamond Mine
"John Taylor's Month Away" / "Missionary" (with King Creosote)	2012	Diamond Mine
"Third Swan" (with King Creosote)	2012	The Jubilee
"Open Eye Signal"	2013	Immunity
"Breathe This Air" (featuring Purity Ring)	2013	Immunity
"Collider"	2014	Immunity
"We Disappear" (featuring Lulu James)	2014	Immunity
"Garden's Heart" (with Natasha Khan)	2014	Non-album single
"I Remember"	2015	Late Night Tales: Jon Hopkins
"Emerald Rush"	2018	Singularity
"Everything Connected"	2018	Singularity
"Singularity"	2018	Singularity
"C O S M"	2018	Singularity
"Luminous Spaces" (with Kelly Lee Owens)	2019	Non-album singles
"Scene Suspended"	2020	Non-album singles
"Meditations"	2020	Non-album singles
"Dawn Chorus"	2020	Piano Versions EP
"Wintergreen"	2021	Piano Versions EP
"Sit Around the Fire" (with Ram Dass and East Forest)	2021	Music for Psychedelic Therapy
"Music for Psychedelic Therapy (Excerpt)"	2021	Music for Psychedelic Therapy
"A Gathering of the Tribe" (with Vylana)	2022	Non-album singles
"Baby, We're Ascending" (with HAAi)	2022	Non-album singles
"Deep in the Glowing Heart (Night Version)" (with ANNA)	2022	Music for Psychedelic Therapy
"To Feel Again / Trois" (with Kelly Lee Owens, Sultan & Shepard, and Jerro)	2022	Non-album single
"Tayos Caves, Ecuador (Meditation Version)"	2023	Music for Psychedelic Therapy
"RITUAL (evocation)" (with Vylana, 7RAYS, Ishq, and Cherif Hashizume)	2024	Ritual
"RITUAL (palace)" (with Vylana)	2024	Ritual
"Forever Held" (with Ólafur Arnalds)	2024	Non-album single
"RITUAL (nothing is lost)"	2025	Ritual
"Reckoning" (with Imogen Heap)	2026	Non-album single

== Remixes ==
Title	Year	Original artist(s)
"Breathe In" (as Mr. Roque)	2002	Frou Frou
"Deepest Blue"	2003	Deepest Blue
"Evergreen" (as Mr. Roque)	2004	Clarkesville
"The Vice-Like Gist of It"	2005	King Creosote
"Heavy Mellow"	2005	Chris Coco
"Spider"	2006	Leo Abrahams
"A Different Light"	2007	Leo Abrahams
"Woozy With Cider"	2007	James Yorkston
"Green Grows the Laurel"	2007	The Memory Band
"First Train Home"	2009	Imogen Heap
"Hey, Who Really Cares"	2009	Headless Heroes
"Two Dancers (ii)"	2010	Wild Beasts
"Angel Echoes"	2010	Four Tet
"Us"	2010	Nosaj Thing
"Sea of Glass"	2011	Tom Middleton
"I Know"	2011	David Lynch
"Panta Rei"	2011	Agoria
"Amenamy"	2013	Purity Ring
"Home"	2013	Daughter
"Last Time"	2014	Moderat
"Midnight"	2014	Coldplay
"Magnets"	2015	Disclosure
"Glitter"	2018	Daniel Avery
"Torch Song"	2020	Nathan Fake
"The Difference"	2020	Flume featuring Toro y Moi
"Halcyon & On"	2022	Orbital
"Receiving" (Jon Hopkins Piano Version)	2023	ANNA featuring Laraaji
"I Might Say Something Stupid"	2024	Charli XCX featuring The 1975

== Production credits ==
Release title	Year	Performing artist(s)	Credited role
"Feeling Strange", "Mutual"	1998	Imogen Heap	Keyboards
Another Day on Earth	2005	Brian Eno	Keyboards
Around in Circles	2006	Dan Arborise	Production, mixing
The Sun Shines Brighter	2006	Ultra	Programming
Bombshell	2007	King Creosote	Production, mixing
Viva la Vida or Death and All His Friends	2008	Coldplay	Co-production, co-writing, keyboards, "colouring"
"The Ballad of Sarah and Jack"	2008	David Holmes	Composition, piano, synthesizer
Prospekt's March	2008	Coldplay	"Light and magic"
"Fell An Ox"	2009	King Creosote	Production, keyboards
"Scars"	2009	Natalie Imbruglia	Mixing, production, programming
"Love You More"	2010	The Pierces	Keyboards, pump organ
Chocabeck	2010	Zucchero	Keyboards, strings
Foxlight	2011	Iarla Ó Lionáird	Keyboards, piano
You & I	2011	The Pierces	Keyboards, organ, pump organ
Mylo Xyloto	2011	Coldplay	Keyboards, "light and magic"
To the Death of Fun	2011	Cashier No. 9	Harmonised strings
Shrines	2012	Purity Ring	Additional production, mixing
Ghost Stories	2014	Coldplay	Co-production, co-writing, "extra magic"
The Ship	2016	Brian Eno	Keyboards
"Migration"	2017	Bonobo	Co-writing, keyboards, piano
"Big Picture"	2017	London Grammar	Production, mixing
Music of the Spheres	2021	Coldplay	Co-production, co-writing, keyboards
"These Small Noises"	2022	Brian Eno	Keyboards
Moon Music	2024	Coldplay	Co-production, co-writing, featured artist
