= Purity Ring discography =

- Studio albums: 4
- EPs: 1
- Singles: 18
- Music videos: 16
- Remixes: 8

Purity Ring are a Canadian electronic music duo formed in 2010 consisting of Megan James and Corin Roddick.

== Studio albums ==
List of studio albums, chart positions, and sales
Title	Details	Peak chart positions										Sales
Title	Details	CAN	AUS	BEL (FL)	SCO	UK	UK Indie	US	US Alt.	US Dance	US Indie	Sales
Shrines	Release date: July 24, 2012; Label: 4AD, Last Gang Records; Formats: Digital download, CD, LP	—	— (Note: Shrines did not enter the Australian ARIA Albums Chart but peaked at number four on the ARIA Hitseekers Chart.)	64	—	100	10	32	—	2	3	US: 90,000
Another Eternity	Release date: March 3, 2015; Label: 4AD; Formats: Digital download, CD, LP	25	25	118	90	61	16	26	4	1	3	
Womb	Release date: April 3, 2020; Label: 4AD; Formats: Digital download, CD, LP	—	—	—	77	— (Note: Womb did not enter the UK Albums Chart, but peaked at number 73 on the UK Album Downloads Chart.)	15	195	—	1	23	
Purity Ring	Release date: September 26, 2025; Label: The Fellowship; Formats: Digital download, CD, LP	—	—	—	—	—	—	—	—	—	—	
"—" denotes album that did not chart or was not released.

== Extended plays ==
List of extended plays
Title	Details
Graves	Released: June 3, 2022; Label: The Fellowship; Formats: Digital download

== Singles ==
=== As lead artists ===
List of singles, with year released, selected chart positions, certifications, and album name shown
Title	Year	Peak chart positions				Certifications	Album
Title	Year	BEL (FL)	UK	UK Indie	US Dance	Certifications	Album
"Belispeak"	2011	—	— (Note: "Belispeak" did not enter the UK Singles Chart, but peaked at number 35 on the UK Physical Singles Chart Top 100.)	—	—		Shrines
"Obedear"	2012	—	—	—	—		Shrines
"Fineshrine"	2012	—	155	24	—	RIAA: Gold	Shrines
"Push Pull"	2014	—	—	— (Note: "Push Pull" did not enter the UK Independent Singles Chart, but peaked at number 12 on the UK Independent Singles Breakers Chart Top 100.)	—		Another Eternity
"Begin Again"	2015	144	—	—	—		Another Eternity
"Bodyache"	2015	—	—	19	— (Note: "Bodyache" did not enter the US Dance/Electronic Songs Chart, but peaked at number 32 on the US Dance/Electronic Digital Song Sales Chart.)		Another Eternity
"Asido"	2017	—	—	—	—		Non-album single
"Stardew"	2020	—	—	—	36		Womb
"Peacefall"	2020	—	—	—	32		Womb
"Better Off Alone"	2020	—	—	—	45		Non-album single
"Soshy"	2021	—	—	—	—		Graves
"Graves"	2022	—	—	—	—		Graves
"Neverend"	2022	—	—	—	—		Graves
"Shines" with Black Dresses	2023	—	—	—	—		Non-album single
"Many Lives"	2025	—	—	—	—		Purity Ring
"Place of My Own"	2025	—	—	—	—		Purity Ring
"Imanocean"	2025	—	—	—	—		Purity Ring
"lemonlime"	2026	—	—	—	—		Transmutations

=== As featured artists ===
List of singles, with year released, selected chart positions, and album name shown
Title	Year	Peak chart positions		Album
Title	Year	BEL (FL)	MEX Eng.	Album
"Breathe This Air" (Jon Hopkins featuring Purity Ring)	2013	142	—	Immunity
"25 Bucks" (Danny Brown featuring Purity Ring)	2013	—	44	Old

=== Promotional singles ===
- "Ungirthed" (2011)
- "Lofticries" (2012)
- "Belispeak II" (featuring Danny Brown) (2012)
- "Grammy" (2013)
- "Amenamy" (Jon Hopkins Remix) (2013)
- "Begin Again (Health Remix)" (2015)
- "Bitter Rhymes" (2026)

=== Remixes ===
List of remixes, with year released and original artists shown
Title	Year	Original artist(s)
"Memories"	2011	Hard Mix
"Summon the Sound"	2011	S.C.U.M
"I Love... That You Know"	2011	Disclosure
"Applause"	2013	Lady Gaga
"Life"	2016	Health
"Rise"	2016	Katy Perry
"In a Better Place"	2017	Mew
"Knife Prty"	2020	Deftones
"Thought Leader"	2026	Health

=== Production credits ===
List of production credits, with year released, main artists, and album name shown
Title	Year	Artist	Album
"Gods Reign (feat. SZA)"	2014	Ab-Soul	These Days...
"Give Me U"	2014	Elijah Blake	Free Pt 1
"Somewhere In Paradise (feat. Jeremih & R. Kelly)"	2015	Chance the Rapper	Non-album single
"Mind Maze"	2017	Katy Perry	Witness
"Miss You More"	2017	Katy Perry	Witness
"Bigger than Me"	2017	Katy Perry	Witness
"Until the Light"	2017	Lights	Skin & Earth
"Fell in Luv (feat. Bryson Tiller)"	2018	Playboi Carti	Die Lit

== Music videos ==
Year	Title	Director(s)
2012	"Belispeak"	BREWER
2012	"Fineshrine"	Young Replicant
2012	"Lofticries"	AG Rojas
2015	"Push Pull"	Renata Raksha
2015	"Begin Again"	Young Replicant
2015	"Heartsigh"	Cecil Frena & Alex Fischer
2017	"Asido"	Megan James
2020	"Stardew"	Tobias Stretch
2020	"Better Off Alone"	Andrew Barchilon
2021	"Sinew"	Tobias Stretch
2021	"Soshy"	Carson Davis Brown
2023	"neverend (tachys remix)"	Jonas Bjerre
2025	"many lives + part ii"	Mike Sunday
2025	"place of my own"	Mike Sunday
2025	"imanocean"	Megan James
2025	"the long night"	Grant Spanier
