= Asleep Versions =

EP by Jon Hopkins
- Released: 11 November 2014
- Genres: Ambient; techno; IDM
- Length: 24:52
- Label: Domino Recording Company
- Producer: Jon Hopkins

Jon Hopkins chronology
Immunity (2013)	Asleep Versions (2014)

Asleep Versions
Review scores
Source	Rating
AllMusic	3.5/5 stars
Pitchfork	7.4/10

Asleep Versions is the fourth EP by English musician and producer Jon Hopkins, released on 11 November 2014. It is a reworking of four tracks from his 2013 album, Immunity.

== Track listing ==
No.	Title	Writer(s)	Length
1.	"Immunity" (with King Creosote)	Kenny Anderson; Jon Hopkins	6:23
2.	"Form by Firelight" (with Raphaelle Standell)	Hopkins; Raphaelle Standell-Preston	4:14
3.	"Breathe This Air"	Hopkins	3:13
4.	"Open Eye Signal"	Hopkins	11:02
Total length:			24:52
