= Monsters (soundtrack) =

Film score by Jon Hopkins
- Released: 29 November 2010
- Recorded: 2010
- Studio: Cafe Music Studios, London
- Genre: Film score
- Length: 31:24
- Label: Domino Recording Company
- Producer: Jon Hopkins

Jon Hopkins chronology
Small Craft on a Milk Sea (2010)	Monsters (2010)	Diamond Mine (2011)

Monsters is the debut soundtrack album composed by Jon Hopkins to the 2010 film of the same name directed by Gareth Edwards in his feature directorial debut. The album featured 12 tracks composed by Hopkins and released through Domino Recording Company on 29 November 2010.

== Development ==
The film score is written by electronic musician Jon Hopkins in his maiden composition for a feature film. He received the offer, after the executives from Vertigo Films noticed his collaborative work with Brian Eno for The Lovely Bones (2009). He was inspired by the cinematography, visuals and color, appreciating Gareth's photography and visual effects skills with some of the shots which "were like works of art" had suggested him to capture the sound further guided by the colors and visuals.

Since Monsters was his first, where he worked a sole composer. He considered the film to be a great learning project to not do things very quickly; sharing his experience on the project, his studio being not equipped at that point to compose a film and his computer also malfunctioned at times when he tried to score for picture. When the film was almost complete, except for few visual effects works needed to be done, Hopkins focused the score on the journey between Andrew and Samantha, which was written through piano and keyboards. He never approached it as a science fiction film or a monster film, but instead felt it to be a road film with science fiction elements.

Hopkins had a structured plan on working on such a large project, counting on most of the challenges, the biggest of them being recording an orchestra portions without having an actual orchestra. He managed to do this, by bringing string player Davide Ross and recorded one portion which he layered it up and built it to sound like an orchestra itself. Hopkins used several electronic systems and blended it with acoustic sounds. Though he refrained from using samplers, much of the score had recorded with the use of layered string parts, upright piano and Korg Trinity into an older version of Cubase VST where he mixed those sounds. As the system became older, it could not handle audio and video playback at the same time, which led him to work for 18 hours into the score, considering it a frustrating experience.

Hopkins had worked on around 22–23 pieces, with only 12 of them being included in the final soundtrack. Hopkins recalled that Edwards was behind all of his ideas, where he would guide him on the high and low points in his score, in order to fit his vision.

== Release ==
The soundtrack to the film was released through Double Six Recordings—which was now submerged into Domino Recording Company—on 29 November 2010.

== Reception ==
Paul Clarke of BBC wrote "if there's one thing that this soundtrack does bring into clear focus, it's that Hopkins is a composer with a subtle yet sublime vision." John Meagher of Irish Independent called it as "the most striking OST [ever] heard since Jonny Greenwood's score for There Will Be Blood." Bevis Man of DIY wrote "On the whole, this is a classy affair, where overindulgence seen in the likes of more flamboyant blockbusters (like Han's Zimmer's 'The Dark Knight' score), is deservedly dropped in favour of quiet restraint. Not essential but quietly affecting nonetheless." Jeannette Catsoulis of The New York Times called it a "trancelike score".

Lisa Kennedy of The Denver Post wrote "Jon Hopkins' rich score makes for a moody, atmospheric escape". Glen Chapman of Den of Geek noted that "as good and effective as it is accompanying the film, it's something of an uneven listen away from it" due to the effective soundscape. Sarah Rayner of MusicOMH wrote "A score rarely evokes images so vibrant and so corporeal – the score for Monsters stands alone, drifting between beauty and terror that shifts, distorts, transports and transcends sense and emotion."

== Track listing ==
No.	Title	Length
1.	"Prologue"	1:14
2.	"Journey"	2:52
3.	"Candles"	2:28
4.	"Water"	1:18
5.	"Underwater"	2:00
6.	"Spores"	1:47
7.	"Campfire"	2:36
8.	"Dawn"	1:58
9.	"Attack"	1:57
10.	"Temple"	2:30
11.	"Encounter"	5:49
12.	"Monsters Theme"	4:55
Total length:		31:24
