= Pink Lightning =

Pink Lightning may refer to:

- Pink Lightning, a Pink Panther animated short
- "Pink Lightning", a song by Purity Ring from their 2020 album Womb
