= Shrines (Purity Ring album) =

2012 studio album by Purity Ring

Studio album by Purity Ring
- Released: July 20, 2012
- Recorded: 2011–2012
- Genres: Electropop; synth-pop; dream pop; indie pop
- Length: 38:20
- Label: 4AD
- Producers: Purity Ring; Jon Hopkins

Purity Ring chronology
Shrines (2012)	Another Eternity (2015)

Singles from Shrines
- 1. "Belispeak" Released: May 29, 2012; 2. "Fineshrine" Released: August 20, 2012

Shrines is the debut studio album by Canadian electronic music duo Purity Ring. It was released on July 20, 2012, by 4AD. Purity Ring recorded the album separately at home over several months, sending their parts via email. Shrines has been described as an electropop, synth-pop, dream pop, and indie pop album, incorporating hip-hop-inspired production and "striking" lyrics. It was produced by Purity Ring, with additional production by Jon Hopkins.

The album, which was recorded following two acclaimed singles by vocalist Megan James and producer Corin Roddick, has been described as "personal" and deals with themes of self empowerment and love using graphic, "gory" imagery.

To promote Shrines, Purity Ring released the promotional single "Obedear", followed by two singles, "Belispeak" and "Fineshrine", to critical acclaim. The album debuted at number 32 on the Billboard 200 and number two on the Dance/Electronic Albums chart. It had sold 90,000 copies in the United States as of February 2015. The album received positive reviews from most critics, many of whom praised its contrast between slick pop production and graphic lyrics. It appeared on several year-end critics' lists, and was nominated for the 2013 Polaris Music Prize. Pitchfork retrospectively described Shrines as "a definitive time capsule for the sound of 2012 (and 2013)".

== Background and recording ==
In the late 2000s, Corin Roddick began producing his own music but, deciding against using his own vocals, began looking for a vocalist. Roddick had known Megan James for years, meeting at one of James' solo shows when they were teenagers. They both frequented the Edmonton music scene, and had played together in bands such as Gobble Gobble. He asked James to write lyrics and sing over a track, the instrumental of which he sent her over email. The song would become "Ungirthed", which they posted online in January 2011. It caught the attention of music blogs, and, following another single release, "Belispeak", led to them getting signed to record label 4AD in April 2012. The tracks were met with acclaim by critics, who compared them to other electronic acts such as The Knife and Burial.

Beginning work on Shrines, the band said that while they are "perfectionists", intending for "[every]thing we release to be as good as everything else", they work best with a deadline in place. Like the previous two singles, the album was recorded separately as James lived in Halifax and Roddick in Montreal. Roddick would send instrumentals over to James via email to record her parts over. James described the process of making the album as very long, "intense and intensive". Roddick stated that after James sent a vocal recording over he would "often need to rearrange them to create a focal point. And that might mean moving something else that was underneath to a different part of the song, or just removing it altogether. I'm not very precious with any part of any track when it comes to trying to make it into an actual song; if it's taking up too much space, I'll gladly get rid of it." Roddick described that when creating the instrumentals he would "take an idea, a five second snippet that I'll run with over and over and over". They announced in an August 2011 interview that the album was 90% done, and hoped it would be released by January 2012.

== Music and lyrics ==
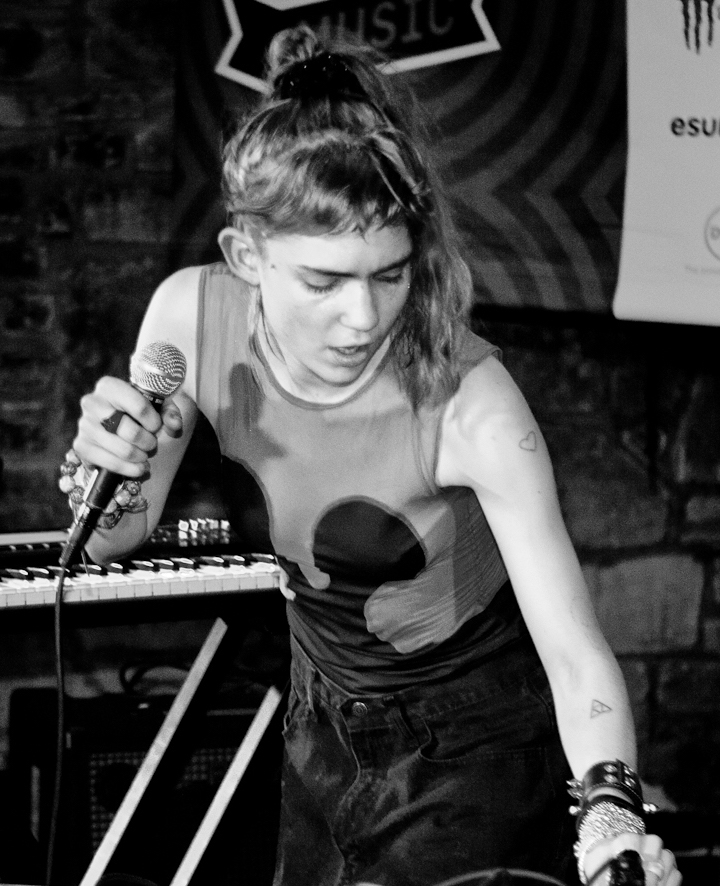
Shrines is influenced by hip-hop artists, while critics compared it to electronic musicians such as Grimes.

James' vocals have been described as "childlike" and "full of wonder". Roddick stated that when producing her vocals, he likes to keep them "clear and present", although they are not completely unfiltered.

Shrines is built around Roddick's production, which incorporates down-pitched, distorted vocals, side-chained synths and programmed beats. Side chaining was used to create "invisible" kick drums, Roddick describing that "it ducks and then there's nothing there – just creating big, empty spaces." Musically, Shrines has been characterized as electropop, synth-pop, dream pop, and indie pop. Roddick, who does all the instrumentals, has cited R&B and hip-hop, as well as artists such as Janet Jackson and Soulja Boy, as influences on the album. His work has also been likened to new wave acts such as OMD and Gary Numan. The album was produced using digital audio workstation Ableton Live with a very small and consistent set of presets, including those from the Arturia software synthesizer replication of the Minimoog.

The album's lyrics, written by James, deal with themes of self-empowerment, and the album is imagined as being an "intensely personal" and strange narrative about strong, young aspiring female witches who experience and interact in a place without any males as they improve, grow and protect themselves. James' lyrics have been described as "gory", "striking" and "fantastical", drawing comparisons to the Brothers Grimm. The song's titles use portmanteaus of English words, while the album's title comes from the line "Build it into pinnacles and shrines of some / Some ghastly predicament of mind you'll find", from the track "Obedear".

== Release and promotion ==
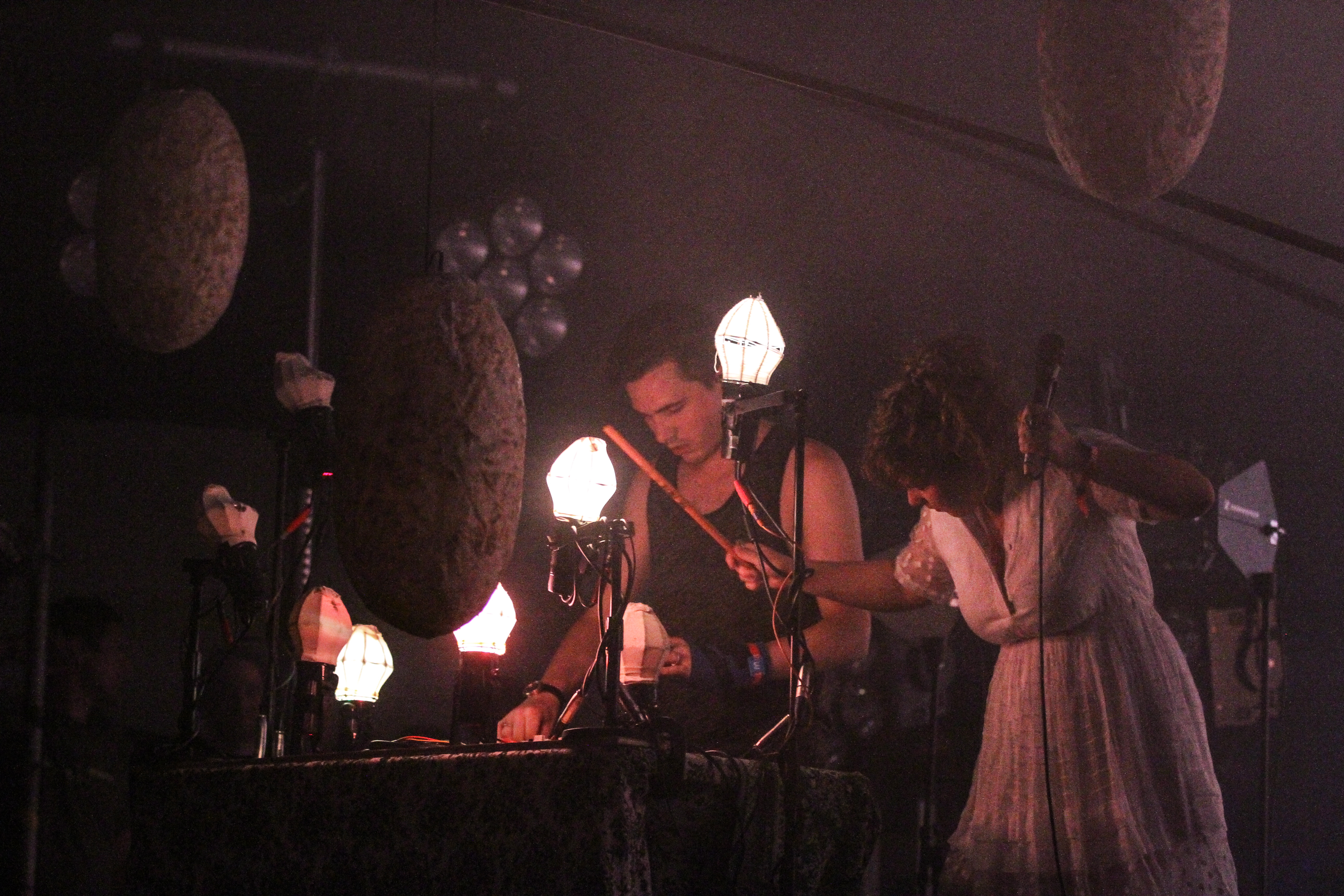
Corin Roddick (left) and Megan James performing at the Melt! Festival in 2013

Purity Ring announced the album's release on April 23, 2012, along with the album's first promotional single "Obedear". The album's lead single, "Belispeak", was released on May 29, 2012, with a video following two days later. "Fineshrine" was released as the album's second promotional single on June 20, to acclaim from critics, highlighting it as a standout from the album. It was followed by a music video released on July 11, 2012. It was released as the album's second single on August 20, 2012. The song was ranked at number 85 on Australian alternative music station Triple J's 2012 Hottest 100 countdown, and was recognized as one of the best tracks of the decade by Pitchfork. The song was featured in an advertisement for UK online retailer Very. It was also featured in season 7 of Skins.

To further promote the album, the band embarked on a tour between April and July with Dirty Projectors. A North American tour was announced in May, which began on May 26, 2012, at Sasquatch! Music Festival in George, Washington, and ended on September 20, 2012, in Philadelphia. Purity Ring released a "sequel" to "Belispeak" titled "Belispeak II" as a single featuring rapper Danny Brown on October 9, 2012. The following day, another North American tour was announced, featuring support from Young Magic. The tour followed their European tour with Doldrums A video for "Lofticries" premiered on Pitchfork.tv in November, directed by AG Rojas, who stated the video "explor[es] the stoicism of psychically connected characters confronted by surreal, climactic moments."

In February 2013, the group released a cover of Soulja Boy's song "Grammy" and announced a spring tour with Blue Hawaii. A remix of "Amenamy" by Jon Hopkins was released on September 23, 2013.

On July 22, 2022, Purity Ring announced it would be releasing the tenth anniversary reissue of the album on July 29. The reissue, titled Shrines X, features three previously unreleased B-sides.

== Reception ==
Professional ratings
Aggregate scores
Source	Rating
AnyDecentMusic?	7.8/10
Metacritic	76/100
Review scores
Source	Rating
AllMusic	3.5/5 stars
The A.V. Club	A−
The Guardian	4/5 stars
The Irish Times	4/5 stars
NME	9/10
The Observer	4/5 stars
Pitchfork	8.4/10
Q	3/5 stars
Rolling Stone	3/5 stars
Spin	7/10

Following the album's release, it reached number 32 in the United States on the Billboard 200, number two on the Dance/Electronic Albums chart, and number three on the Independent Albums chart. It had sold 90,000 copies in the US as of February 2015. Shrines also peaked at number 100 on the UK Albums Chart.

Shrines received generally favorable reviews from music critics. At Metacritic, which assigns a normalized rating out of 100 to reviews from mainstream publications, the album received an average score of 76, based on 37 reviews. Leor Galil of The A.V. Club praised the album as a "knockout", categorizing the group as an outsider of other groups with gory lyrics thanks to its non-violent themes and honoring them for being able to combine these graphic lyrics with danceable beats. Hayley Avon of NME wrote that Shrines "could just as easily remain in its closed-circle clique" while being accessible to mainstream listeners, noting that the "music is so slick it sometimes stinks of cash, yet the songs are charming, scuffed at the edges, the childlike melodies accentuated when Megan's voice takes on its youthful tone", concluding with calling the record a "euphoric treat in its own right, made all the more thrilling by its heady potential."

Mark Richardson of Pitchfork awarded the album a "Best New Music" label, saying "the compulsively listenable Shrines stands quite well on its own. Most bands never manage a statement this forceful." Dave Simpson of The Guardian recommended the album to those looking for a "more electro-based companion" of Visions by Grimes, while a review in the sister paper The Observer noted the influences of Shrines to be "of the highest quality (Björk, Fever Ray, Burial), which, at best, bears comparison with them all." Jessica Hopper of Spin stated that "the contrast between Purity Ring's two halves is special and compelling, but Shrines goes over best when Roddick's reverent sound and James' lustful fury synchronize and break you off properly, womb-stem-style."

In more negative reviews of the album, critics criticized the album's repetition and James' vocals. Matt James of PopMatters opined that the record's "familiarity and repetition" somehow try to ruin its "dazzling" lyrical imagery and "divinity here worthy of rapture and reverence", while a Slant Magazine reviewer that the "Manic Pixie Dream Girl vocal qualities" weakens the album's somberness, leading to "an odd and often dissatisfying mix of light and heavy." Robert Christgau rated the album as a one-star honorable mention, writing, "Displaced soprano asks musical question: is this home or exile."

Shrines has been retrospectively noted as an influential album on electronic music. In a 2015 article, Pitchfork described the album as "a definitive time capsule for the sound of 2012 (and 2013)". James noted that they had "constantly" heard many artists imitate their style since the album came out.

=== Accolades ===
Shrines was in the top 30 of numerous year-end lists. The album was nominated for the 2013 Polaris Music Prize.

Publication	Rank	Ref.
Beats Per Minute	21	
Consequence of Sound	28	
DIY	21	
Exclaim!	41	
Fact	46	
The Fly	15	
Gigwise	25	
NME	50	
Pazz & Jop	45	
Pitchfork	24	
PopMatters	71	
Spin	9	
Spinner	23	
Stereogum	29	
Time Out London	24	
Under the Radar	25	

== Track listing ==
All tracks are written by Purity Ring, except "Grandloves", written by Purity Ring and Young Magic.

Shrines track listing
No.	Title	Length
1.	"Crawlersout"	3:10
2.	"Fineshrine"	3:29
3.	"Ungirthed"	2:48
4.	"Amenamy"	3:27
5.	"Grandloves"	4:33
6.	"Cartographist"	4:48
7.	"Belispeak"	2:58
8.	"Saltkin"	3:25
9.	"Obedear"	3:29
10.	"Lofticries"	3:59
11.	"Shuck"	2:09
Total length:		38:20

Shrines X track listing
No.	Title	Length
12.	"X Inovein"	3:10
13.	"X Firmament"	3:02
14.	"X Crawlersout" (Prototype)	3:33
Total length:		48:05

Notes

- All titles are stylized in all lowercase.
- "Grandloves" contains a sample of "You with Air" by Young Magic.
- "Obedear" is the theme tune of the American TV comedy drama series Search Party.

== Personnel ==
Credits adapted from the liner notes of Shrines.

- Purity Ring – production, mixing
- Jon Hopkins – mixing, additional production (track 8)
- James Benjamin – additional mixing
- Chris Gehringer – mastering
- Matt de Jong – layout
- Kristina Baumgartner – artwork

== Charts ==
=== Weekly charts ===
Chart (2012)	Peak position
Belgian Albums (Ultratop Flanders)	64
Dutch Alternative Albums (Mega Alternative Top 30)	23
UK Albums (Official Charts)	100
UK Independent Albums (Official Charts)	10
US Billboard 200	32
US Independent Albums (Billboard)	3
US Top Dance Albums (Billboard)	2

=== Year-end charts ===
Chart (2012)	Position
US Dance/Electronic Albums (Billboard)	25

== Release history ==
Region	Date	Format(s)	Label	Catalogue no.	Ref.
Australia	20 July 2012	CD; LP; digital download	4AD	CAD3218	
New Zealand	20 July 2012	CD; LP; digital download	4AD	CAD3218	
Europe	20 July 2012	CD; LP; digital download	4AD	CAD3218	
Japan	20 July 2012	CD; LP; digital download	Hostess Entertainment Unlimited	BGJ-10153	
Canada	24 July 2012	CD; LP; digital download	Last Gang	01399	
United States	24 July 2012	CD; LP; digital download	4AD	CAD3218	
