= Music for Psychedelic Therapy =

Studio album by Jon Hopkins
- Released: 12 November 2021
- Genre: Electronic, ambient
- Length: 60:03
- Label: Domino
- Producer: Jon Hopkins

Jon Hopkins chronology
Singularity (2018)	Music for Psychedelic Therapy (2021)	Ritual (2024)

Singles from Music for Psychedelic Therapy
- 1. "Sit Around the Fire" Released: 2 September 2021; 2. "Love Flows Over Us in Prismatic Waves" & "Deep in the Glowing Heart" Released: 14 October 2021

Music for Psychedelic Therapy is the sixth studio album by English electronic music producer Jon Hopkins, released on 12 November 2021 by Domino Recording Company.

== Background and recording ==
Hopkins had previously composed music experiences for a psilocybin trial held at Imperial College London. He designed the album to last the same time as an average ketamine trip. The album includes field recordings Hopkins recorded 200 feet (61 m) deep in Cueva de los Tayos in Ecuador.

== Release ==
On 2 September 2021, Hopkins announced the release of his sixth studio album, along with the first single "Sit Around the Fire". Of the single, which features collaborations by East Forest and Ram Dass, Hopkins said:

"Sit Around the Fire" exists from one of the deep synchronicities that ushered this thing (Music for Psychedelic Therapy) into being. I was contacted by East Forest, who had spent some time with Ram Dass in Hawaii before he passed. He was given access to several lesser-heard talks from the 70s, and asked to set them to music. He sent me some starting points, including the beautiful choral vocals he recorded which open the piece. I put my headphones on and with Ram Dass' voice inside my head, I sat at the piano and improvised. What you hear is the first thing that came out - it just appeared in response to the words."

The album was premiered at L-Acoustics Creations in Westlake Village, California at a Pitchblack Playback album listening session.

== Reception ==
Music for Psychedelic Therapy ratings
Aggregate scores
Source	Rating
AnyDecentMusic?	7.5/10
Metacritic	79/100
Review scores
Source	Rating
AllMusic	3.5/5 stars
Clash	9/10
DIY	3/5 stars
Exclaim!	9/10
The Guardian	3/5 stars
Mojo	4/5 stars
musicOMH	4.5/5 stars
Pitchfork	7.4/10
PopMatters	8/10
Under the Radar	7.5/10

Music for Psychedelic Therapy was met with "generally favorable" reviews from critics. At Metacritic, which assigns a weighted average rating out of 100 to reviews from mainstream publications, this release received an average score of 79 based on 13 reviews. Aggregator AnyDecentMusic? gave the release a 7.5 out of 10 based on a critical consensus of 14 reviews.

The Guardian's Kitty Empire stated that for all its "pervasive beauty", ultimately the album "feels like only the eight-minute apex track 'Deep in the Glowing Heart' rearranges the listener's molecules in a transformational way." Pitchfork's Megan Buerger was more positive, observing that when "the final hums fade and tape crackles lift, you get a glimpse at the wide-eyed resolution felt when the chemical loosens its grip." Recognising Hopkins' as a "master at suspense and release", they praised his new-found restraint on the record.

=== Year-end lists ===
Music for Psychedelic Therapy on year-end lists
Publication	#	Ref.
Magnetic	17	
MusicOMH	28	
PopMatters	67	

== Track listing ==
All tracks are written by Jon Hopkins except where noted. All tracks are produced by Hopkins.

Music for Psychedelic Therapy track listing
No.	Title	Writer(s)	Length
1.	"Welcome"	Hopkins; 7Rays	6:22
2.	"Tayos Caves, Ecuador I"		6:15
3.	"Tayos Caves, Ecuador II"		5:07
4.	"Tayos Caves, Ecuador III"		7:39
5.	"Love Flows Over Us in Prismatic Waves"		6:52
6.	"Deep in the Glowing Heart"		8:51
7.	"Ascending, Dawn Sky"	Hopkins; 7Rays	9:22
8.	"Arriving"	Hopkins; 7Rays	4:35
9.	"Sit Around the Fire"	Hopkins; East Forest; Ram Dass	8:22
Total length:			60:03

Japanese edition bonus track
No.	Title	Length
10.	"1/2 Singing Bowl (Ascension) - Excerpt"	4:30
Total length:		68:00

== Charts ==
Chart performance of Music for Psychedelic Therapy
Chart (2021–2022)	Peak position
Belgian Albums (Ultratop Flanders)	145
German Albums (Offizielle Top 100)	72
Scottish Albums (OCC)	16
UK Independent Albums (OCC)	8

== See also ==
- Music therapy
- Psychedelic therapy
