= Another Eternity =

Studio album by Purity Ring
- Released: February 27, 2015
- Recorded: 2014
- Genre: Electronic; witch house; dream pop; electropop; future bass
- Length: 35:23
- Label: 4AD
- Producer: Corin Roddick; Megan James

Purity Ring chronology
Shrines (2012)	Another Eternity (2015)	Womb (2020)

Singles from Another Eternity
- 1. "Push Pull" Released: December 3, 2014; 2. "Begin Again" Released: January 13, 2015; 3. "Bodyache" Released: February 26, 2015

Professional ratings
Aggregate scores
Source	Rating
AnyDecentMusic?	6.7/10
Metacritic	70/100
Review scores
Source	Rating
AllMusic	4/5 stars
Billboard	4/5 stars
Complex	3/5
Consequence of Sound	B
Exclaim!	8/10
The Guardian	2/5 stars
Pitchfork	6.6/10
Rolling Stone	3.5/5 stars
Slant Magazine	3.5/5 stars
Spin	6/10

Another Eternity (stylized in lowercase letters) is the second studio album by Canadian electronic music duo Purity Ring. It was released on February 27, 2015, by 4AD.

== Release and promotion ==
In February 2014, the duo announced that they were working on a second studio album. "Push Pull" was released as the first single from the album on December 3, 2014. On January 13, 2015, the album's second single, "Begin Again", was released, along with the formal reveal of the album's title, cover, and track listing. On January 23, 2015, Roddick played "Repetition" and "Bodyache" during a DJ set on Pitchfork Radio. "Bodyache" was released as the album's third single on February 26, 2015.

The music video of "Begin Again" was released exclusively through Apple Music on October 12, 2015.

== Track listing ==
All tracks are written by Corin Roddick and Megan James.

No.	Title	Length
1.	"Heartsigh"	3:19
2.	"Bodyache"	2:53
3.	"Push Pull"	3:27
4.	"Repetition"	3:38
5.	"Stranger than Earth"	4:18
6.	"Begin Again"	3:37
7.	"Dust Hymn"	3:30
8.	"Flood on the Floor"	3:14
9.	"Sea Castle"	3:27
10.	"Stillness in Woe"	4:00
Total length:		35:23

== Personnel ==
Credits adapted from the liner notes of Another Eternity.

Purity Ring

- Corin Roddick – production, recording
- Megan James – production, recording, vocals

Additional personnel

- Maddox Chhimm – mixing
- Alison Fielding – layout
- Tallulah Fontaine – artwork, layout
- Cecil Frena – co-production ("Flood on the Floor")
- Jaycen Joshua – mixing
- Ryan Kaul – mixing
- Dave Kutch – mastering
- Renata Raksha – layout, photography

== Charts ==
=== Weekly charts ===
Chart (2015)	Peak position
Australian Albums (ARIA)	25
Belgian Albums (Ultratop Flanders)	118
Canadian Albums (Billboard)	25
UK Albums (OCC)	61
UK Independent Albums (OCC)	16
US Billboard 200	26
US Independent Albums (Billboard)	3
US Top Dance Albums (Billboard)	1
US Top Alternative Albums (Billboard)	4

=== Year-end charts ===
Chart (2015)	Position
US Dance/Electronic Albums (Billboard)	9

Chart (2016)	Position
US Dance/Electronic Albums (Billboard)	20

== Release history ==
Region	Date	Format	Label	Ref.
Australia	February 27, 2015	CD; digital download	Remote Control	
Germany	February 27, 2015	CD; digital download	4AD	
Ireland	February 27, 2015	CD; LP; digital download	4AD	
United Kingdom	March 2, 2015	CD; LP; digital download	4AD	
Canada	March 3, 2015	CD; LP; digital download	Last Gang	
United States	March 3, 2015	CD; LP; digital download	4AD	
Germany	March 6, 2015	LP	4AD	
Australia	March 27, 2015	LP	Remote Control	
