= Young Magic =

American electronica band

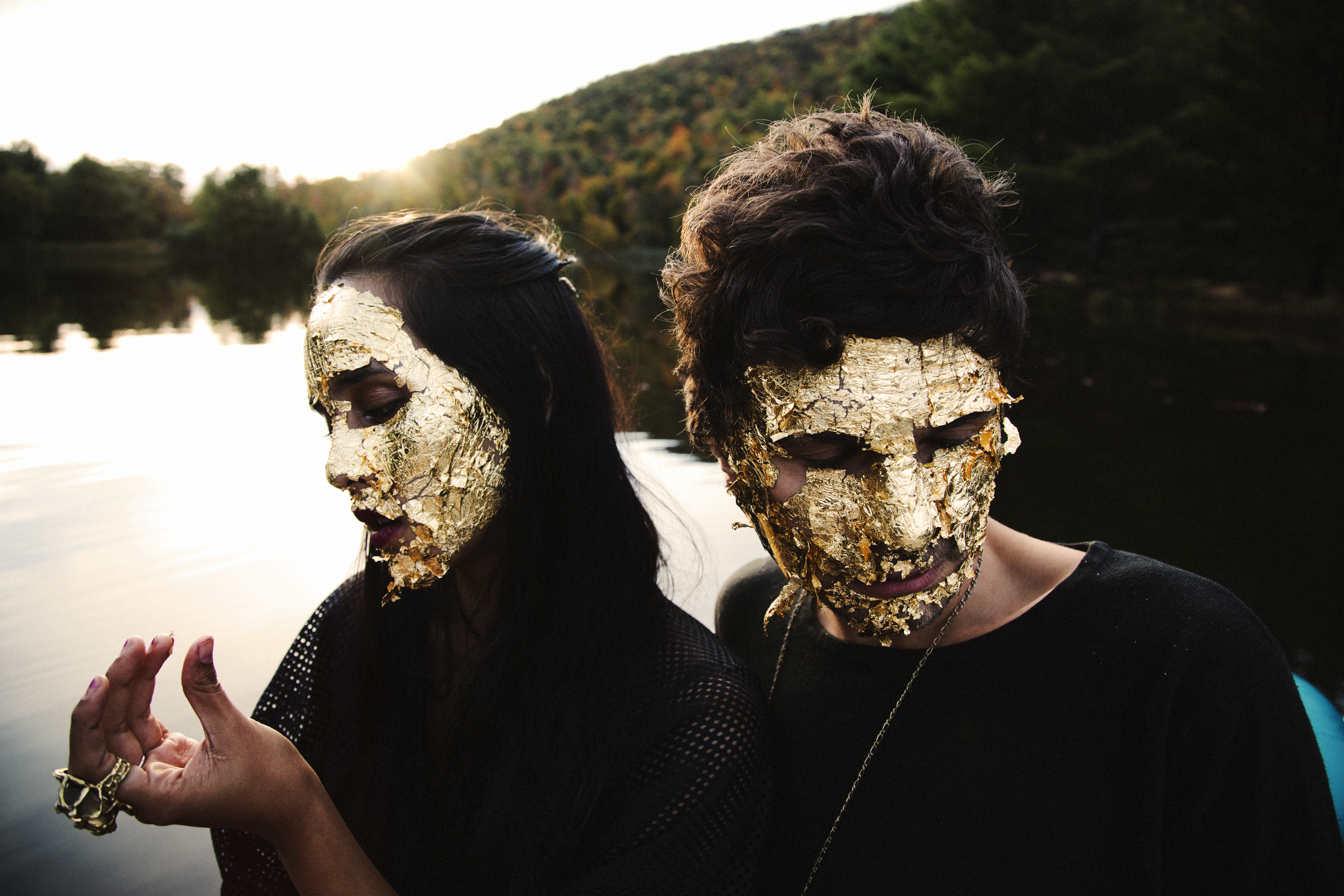
- Young Magic in 2014

Background information
- Origin: Brooklyn, New York, U.S.
- Genres: Electronic, experimental, dream pop, trip hop
- Years active: 2010–present
- Labels: Carpark
- Members: Melati Malay; Isaac Emmanuel
- Past members: Michael Italia
- Website: cargocollective.com/youngmagic

Young Magic is an American electronic music group from Brooklyn, New York, formed in 2010. The project consists of multi-instrumentalists and producers Melati Malay and Isaac Emmanuel.

The group is known for their percussive musical style, often incorporating field recordings made by band members. The duo have released mixtapes in collaboration with London-based visual artist Leif Podhajsky, who is also responsible for the band's album cover artwork. They have collaborated with American composer Kelsey Lu, UK trip hop pioneer Tricky, and have been sampled by Purity Ring and Playboi Carti.

== History ==
=== Formation ===
Original members Melati Malay, Isaac Emmanuel and Michael Italia met in New York City during 2010. Malay was born in Jakarta, Indonesia, Emmanuel and Italia in Australia. After separately traveling abroad and recording material, the group rented a space above a speakeasy in Brooklyn during 2011 and began collaborating. Their debut 7" single, "Sparkly/You With Air", was released on February 8, 2011, by Carpark Records, followed by "Night in the Ocean/Slip Time".

=== Melt ===
Young Magic's debut studio album, Melt, was released by Carpark on February 14, 2012. The LP was recorded in Mexico, Argentina, Brazil, United States, Spain, Germany, Iceland, Australia and the UK. The New York Times described the music on Melt as "Lush and immersive, on Young Magic's debut the reverb ripples, synthesizers swoop, quasi-tribal percussion crunches and plinks and voices ooh and ah in washes of harmony." The BBC described the debut as "music that waxes and wanes, and explodes; and a great spirit which, rather than confine itself to basements and bedsits, aims its sights on the heavens". The band released the limited-edition Maps mixtape later that year, consisting of recorded material which did not fit on Melt. In 2012 Purity Ring sampled the lead vocal from Young Magic's You With Air on their song "Grandloves" from the album Shrines (4AD). During 2013, Young Magic toured with Purity Ring and also made festival appearances at Lowlands, Austin Psych Fest and The Brooklyn Museum.

=== Breathing Statues ===
Following the departure of Italia, the band's second album, Breathing Statues, was released on May 6, 2014, by Carpark Records. One week prior to its official release, a stream of the album was announced by the Fader, which also noted that it was made "in Morocco, France, the Czech Republic, Australia and Iceland. The duo recorded while on tour, finishing up in their New York studio".Breathing Statues was mixed by engineer Sean Maffuci Gang Gang Dance and signaled new ambient directions for the project.' The NME described the album's style as "Hypnotic. Primarily, it relies on metallic-sounding percussion, synth motifs, brittle and recurring samples" and The 405 as "a more cohesive body of work, it demonstrates maturity, and a confidence in their passion for detail, preferring to construct layers, textures and cinematic soundscapes". '

=== Remixes Vol. 1 ===
On April 23, 2015, the group released the compilation album Remixes Vol. 1, with contributions by Matthewdavid, Teebs, the Acid, Mark McGuire and Gray. All proceeds for the album were donated to the Aboriginal Benefits Foundation.

=== Still Life ===
On May 13, 2016, Young Magic released their third studio album, Still Life. The album was inspired by Malay's travels in her birthplace of Java, Indonesia. In Interview magazine, the singer explained, "Still Life can be one version of yourself, still like a painting, but on the other hand constantly recreating that version of yourself according to environmental, social, political influences in this world...a world where people constantly tell you who to pray to, what to buy into, and who your enemies should be. It's my reaction to that. Life, and yourself within it, is constantly going to be recreated, so there's no point in being steadfast in one ideology". Bolivian-born, New York City–based percussionist Daniel Alejandro Siles Mendoza, a contributor to the album, joined the band's touring line-up. The album also featured contributions from producer Rioux and cellist and composer Kelsey Lu.

In May 2016 the group supported New York experimental band Yeasayer on their North American tour.

=== Collaborations ===
Kyp Malone of TV on the Radio released a remix for Young Magic's "Default Memory" in 2016.

In 2018 the band supported Tricky on his North American tour. The following year Tricky recorded and produced a new version of Young Magic's song "Lucien," which was released on his False Idols/!K7 Records label on August 2, 2019.

Young Magic has a writing credit on American rapper Playboi Carti's 2019 single "Fell In Luv".

=== Associated projects ===
Melati Malay is also a member of Asa Tone, a collaboration with New York electronic music producers Kaazi and Tristan Arp. The group released their debut album Temporary Music on Leaving Records on January 31, 2020. Malay also releases solo music under the moniker Melati ESP and is set to release her debut album hipernatural on April 28, 2023 via Carpark Records.

== Discography ==
=== Studio albums ===
- Melt (2012, Carpark Records)
- Breathing Statues (2014, Carpark Records)
- Still Life (2016, Carpark Records)

=== Singles ===
- "You With Air" 7" (2011, Carpark Records)
- "Night in the Ocean" 7" (2011, Carpark Records)

=== Mixtape albums ===
- Maps (2012, Carpark Records)

=== Compilation albums / features ===
- Lucien (Tricky Remix) (2019, False Idols/!K7)
- Remixes Vol. 1 (2015, self-released)
