= Immunity (Jon Hopkins album) =

Studio album by Jon Hopkins
- Released: 3 June 2013
- Genre: Electronic; IDM; microhouse; ambient
- Length: 60:00
- Label: Domino
- Producer: Jon Hopkins

Jon Hopkins chronology
Diamond Mine (2011)	Immunity (2013)	Singularity (2018)

Singles from Immunity
- 1. "Open Eye Signal" Released: 24 April 2013; 2. "Breathe This Air" Released: 23 September 2013; 3. "Collider" Released: 24 February 2014; 4. "We Disappear" Released: 29 June 2014

Immunity is the fourth studio album by English electronic musician and producer Jon Hopkins. It was released on 3 June 2013 by Domino Records to critical acclaim and was nominated for the 2013 Mercury Prize for best album.

== Production ==
Among the artists that contributed vocals were long-time collaborator King Creosote, and Corin Roddick and Megan James of the band Purity Ring. It was recorded and produced in Hopkins's London studio, with Hopkins often using homemade sound effects or the natural sound of the room.

== Promotion ==
On 6 March 2013, Hopkins announced that his fourth solo album Immunity would be released by Domino Records on 3 June in the UK, and 4 June in the US. A trailer for the album featuring a snippet of the track "Collider" from the album was made available through YouTube. The first single "Open Eye Signal" was uploaded on Pitchfork's YouTube channel on 24 April 2013. The hour-long Immunity was released on 3 June 2013 by Domino Recording Company in London, on vinyl, CD, and digitally. Immunity peaked at number 67 on the UK Albums Chart and at number 12 on the UK Dance Albums Chart. It also peaked at number 13 on Billboard's Top Dance/Electronic Albums chart. In Britain, it was also nominated for the 2013 Mercury Prize for best album.

== Critical reception ==
Professional ratings
Aggregate scores
Source	Rating
AnyDecentMusic?	8.1/10
Metacritic	82/100
Review scores
Source	Rating
AllMusic	3.5/5 stars
Mixmag	5/5
Mojo	4/5 stars
NME	8/10
The Observer	4/5 stars
Pitchfork	8.5/10
Q	4/5 stars
Resident Advisor	4.5/5
Spin	8/10
Vice	A−

Immunity met with a largely positive reception. It received a cumulative score of 82 out of 100 on Metacritic, indicating "universal acclaim". Stated Mixmag, "Immunity is an album of organic techno and exquisite mini-symphonies."

"[Hopkins] created the album's warm, alive feel by shunning digital perfection in favor of the analog synthesis of original sounds, both electronic and physical. The ambient prelude of the haunting, scrambled glitch-house opener 'We Disappear'-- a key unlocks the door of Hopkins' London studio and his footsteps lead in-- is more than idle window dressing: He is ushering us into the tactile space that suffuses the record. He drums on desks, plays salt shakers, slows down serendipitous recordings of nearby fireworks, boosts the kick-drummed rattle of a window."
— Pitchfork

Several reviews focused on the cohesiveness of the tracks. Stated The Observer, the album "lasts exactly an hour but feels much longer. This isn't a criticism: in eight vivid, atmospheric tracks, Immunity captures the feel of an epic night out. Hopkins's beats shuffle and trip but there is a great clarity of focus throughout, and a delicate beauty." Stated MusicOMH, "It is that rarest of things in 2013, an album which demands to be listened to as a whole and indeed functions best as an hour-long work of art."

Most reviews praised the emotional and introspective nature of the album. Stated XLR8R, there is a "Brian Eno-esque atmosphere that appears throughout Immunity, a kind of angelic presence touching every track and even making Hopkins' more brooding efforts introspective in a very powerful way." MusicOMH also called it "an intelligent and deeply human album" and a "modern classic."

AllMusic gave it a largely positive review, stating "Some of Immunity's most impressive moments expand on the blend of rhythm and atmosphere Hopkins emphasized on Insides... the album still reflects how Hopkins' polished approach is something of a blessing and a curse. Immunity shows how he's grown, in his subtle, accomplished way... yet its tracks occasionally feel like the surroundings for a focal point that never arrives." In contrast, Pitchfork described Immunity as a "remarkably visceral, sensual, confident electronic record that stays absorbing from beginning to end."

In 2017, Pitchfork placed the album at number 37 on its list of "The 50 Best IDM Albums of All Time".

== Track listing ==
No.	Title	Length
1.	"We Disappear"	4:50
2.	"Open Eye Signal"	7:48
3.	"Breathe This Air"	5:29
4.	"Collider"	9:21
5.	"Abandon Window"	4:57
6.	"Form by Firelight"	5:45
7.	"Sun Harmonics"	11:54
8.	"Immunity"	9:56

iTunes Store bonus tracks
No.	Title	Length
9.	"Open Eye Signal" (Happa Remix)	6:03
10.	"Open Eye Signal" (Lord of the Isles Remix)	7:28
11.	"Open Eye Signal" (Luke Abbott Remix)	6:55
12.	"Open Eye Signal" (Nosaj Thing Remix)	3:28

== Personnel ==
- Jon Hopkins – composition, production, primary artist
- Sarah Jones – drums
- Emma Smith – vocals, violin
- Lisa Elle – vocals
- Vince Sipprell – vocals
- King Creosote – vocals
- Megan James – vocals
- Corin Roddick – engineering
- Cherif Hashizume – engineering
- Rik Simpson – mixing
- Guy Davie – mastering
- Linden Gledhill – artwork
- Craig Ward – artwork

== Charts ==
Chart (2013)	Peak position
Belgian Albums (Ultratop Flanders)	64
Belgian Albums (Ultratop Wallonia)	184
Irish Albums (IRMA)	45
Scottish Albums (OCC)	76
UK Albums (OCC)	63
UK Dance Albums (OCC)	12
UK Independent Albums (OCC)	16
US Top Dance Albums (Billboard)	13
