= Opalescent (album) =

Studio album by Jon Hopkins
- Released: 30 July 2001
- Recorded: 1999–2001
- Genres: Electronic; ambient
- Length: 55:36
- Labels: Just Music; absolute zero
- Producer: Jon Hopkins

Jon Hopkins chronology
Opalescent (2001)	Contact Note (2004)

Opalescent is the debut studio album by English musician and producer Jon Hopkins, released on 30 June 2001 under Just Music and absolute zero. His only assistance in the album came from his friend and regular collaborator Leo Abrahams, who plays Opalescent's guitars.

== Background ==
In 1999 Hopkins signed with boutique London label Just Music as a solo artist, and began recording his debut album Opalescent. At the time he was also working part-time as a studio session musician. Opalescent attracted positive press attention upon its release, and several tracks were licensed to Sex and the City.

Hopkins spoke on how he felt about the album: "It’s always going to have a special place for me. It’s where it all began, and it was very personal, very heartfelt. There were tracks on it I will always be proud of. Now, I obviously don’t like everything on it, but you’re always critical of what you’ve done. Otherwise you wouldn’t move forward. I’ve tried to do every album in a different style, which is why I tend to leave a fair bit of time between each one. But yeah, it’s got a very specific sound all of its own, which is a valid step in my whole musical journey."

== Reissue ==
Opalescent was remastered and reissued for its 15-year anniversary on 26 August 2016. It also was issued on vinyl for the first time that year.

== Critical reception ==
Professional ratings
Review scores
Source	Rating
Clash	7/10
DJ Magazine	4/5 stars
Gigwise	4/5 stars
The Guardian	3/5 stars
The Independent	4/5 stars
Pitchfork	5.6/10
Record Collector	3/5 stars

Upon its release, Opalescent was met with generally mixed reviews from music critics, but many years after Hopkins' worldwide success as a musician and record producer, the album is now critically acclaimed. Kevin Lozano from Pitchfork gave Opalescent a 5.6/10 and wrote: "This reissue of the electronic composer’s first album, made in his early 20s, rings thin and hollow compared to the dark genius of his later work." Angus McKeon from Clash gave Opalescent a 7/10 and wrote: "When compared to some of his later projects, you can recognise signs of inexperience in Hopkins production. Yet Opalescent was able to not only establish Hopkins as a groundbreaking solo artist in his own right but also help lay the foundations for future champions of the ambient stylings." The Guardian reviewed it as "a beautifully realized debut. Using synth oozes, phased and echoed guitars and pianos and chilled beats, his wonderful tunes drift from calm to eerie power like a restless sea. It will delight any lovers of beautiful music." DJ Magazine gave it 4/5 stars, and stated "Piano, guitar strings and slow beats blend like the clouds at sunset (or an opiate smoothy) filtering in and out like elegantly wasted beauty. Darker drums add a further depth."

== Track listing ==
All tracks are written by Jon Hopkins.

No.	Title	Length
1.	"Elegiac"	6:24
2.	"Private Universe"	5:40
3.	"Halcyon"	5:01
4.	"Opalescent"	2:11
5.	"Lost In Thought"	6:16
6.	"Fading Glow"	6:58
7.	"Apparition"	2:02
8.	"Inner Peace"	4:53
9.	"Cerulean"	3:58
10.	"Grace"	4:17
11.	"Cold Out There"	3:54
12.	"Afterlife"	4:00
Total length:		55:36

Notes

- Additional guitar by Leo Abrahams.
