= Purity Ring (album) =

2025 studio album by Purity Ring

Studio album by Purity Ring
- Released: September 26, 2025
- Length: 36:00
- Label: The Fellowship
- Producer: Purity Ring

Purity Ring chronology
Graves (2022)	Purity Ring (2025)

Singles from Purity Ring
- 1. "Many Lives/Part II" Released: June 5, 2025; 2. "Place of My Own" Released: July 10, 2025; 3. "Imanocean" Released: August 21, 2025

Remix album cover

Singles from Transmutations
- 1. "Place of My Own (Maffalda, Pabllo Vittar remix)" Released: August 7, 2025; 2. "The Long Night (TDJ Mix)" Released: November 24, 2025; 3. "Only Alive [From 100 Nights of Hero]" Released: December 5, 2025; 4. "Lemonlime" Released: April 10, 2026

Purity Ring (stylized in all lowercase) is the self-titled fourth studio album by the Canadian synthpop duo Purity Ring. It was released on September 26, 2025.

== Release ==
On June 5, 2025, the band released two new songs: "Many Lives" and "Part II". On July 10, 2025, the band released the single "Place of My Own" alongside the album's release date of September 26, 2025, and a headlining North American tour in the autumn of 2025 to support the album. The last single for the album, "Imanocean", was released August 21, 2025. The album released on September 26 alongside a music video for "The Long Night".

A remix album titled Transmutations was released on October 22, 2026. Alongside thirteen remixes, it included two original songs which had been released since the album.

== Themes ==
The album is a concept album, imitating a soundtrack for a fictional role-playing game. The album was inspired by video games including The Legend of Zelda: Ocarina of Time, Metaphor: ReFantazio, Final Fantasy X, Final Fantasy VI, and Nier: Automata.

== Critical reception ==
Professional ratings
Review scores
Source	Rating
AllMusic	4/5 stars
Clash	9/10
DIY	4/5 stars
Paste	7.1/10

In a review for Clash, Tom Morgan praises the album for its "compelling narratives," describing it as "immersive, innovative" and "affecting". DIY's Gemma Cockrell also had a favorable review, expressing that the album is "ambitious in scope but never loses the intimate emotional pull that Corin Roddick and Megan James command so effortlessly."

Paste's Sam Rosenberg had a more mixed opinion, writing that while the album "mostly succeeds" in emulating the feeling of listening to video game soundtracks, "one wishes it were as moving as James and Roddick seem to want it to be."

== Track listing ==
All tracks are written by and produced by Megan James and Corin Roddick.

Purity Ring track listing
No.	Title	Writer(s)	Length
1.	"Relict"		2:59
2.	"Many Lives"		3:01
3.	"Part II"		1:42
4.	"Place of My Own"	Ginger	3:00
5.	"Red the Sunrise"		3:15
6.	"Memory Ruins"		2:59
7.	"Mistral"		0:44
8.	"The Long Night"	David Kyhlberg; Johan Norberg; Tobias Olofsson	4:17
9.	"Imanocean"	Ginger	3:37
10.	"Between You and Shadows"		3:07
11.	"MJ Odyssey"		1:42
12.	"Broken Well"		2:46
13.	"Glacier (In Memory of RS)"		3:25
Total length:			36:00

== Personnel ==
Credits adapted from Tidal and album liner notes.

=== Purity Ring ===
- Megan James – vocals, production
- Corin Roddick – production, mixing

=== Additional contributors ===
- Mike Bozzi – mastering
- Jordan Clemens – guitar (tracks 2, 3, 5, 6, 9, 10, 12, 13)
- Craig Newnes – bass, guitar (9), engineering (9,11)

== Transmutations ==
A remix album titled Transmutations was released on October 22, 2026. Alongside thirteen remixes, it included two original songs which had been released since the album.

Transmutations track listing
No.	Title	Writer(s)	Length
1.	"Imanocean (Quit Life remix)"		4:51
2.	"Relict (Dusqk remix)"		3:45
3.	"Glacier (In Memory of RS) (Anamanaguchi remix)"		2:41
4.	"Between You and Shadows (GRRL Remix)"		3:32
5.	"Place of My Own (Maffalda, Pabllo Vittar remix)"		1:44
6.	"Mistral (Emma Aibara remix)"		2:22
7.	"Part II (Full Body 2 remix)"		4:02
8.	"Many Lives (Health remix)"		3:35
9.	"The Long Night (TDJ remix)"		3:08
10.	"Red The Sunrise (Yawning Portal sunset version)"		3:07
11.	"Memory Ruins (TAAHLIAH remix)"		2:50
12.	"MJ Odyssey (Astra King remix)"		3:18
13.	"Broken Well (Galen Tipton, Diana Starshine, Mimete remix)"		3:25
14.	"Lemonlime"	Ginger	3:25
15.	"Only Alive (from 100 Nights of Hero)"	Ginger	3:08
Total length:			50:00
