= Ritual (Jon Hopkins album) =

2024 studio album by Jon Hopkins

Studio album by Jon Hopkins
- Released: 30 August 2024
- Genres: Ambient; electronic
- Length: 41:10
- Label: Domino
- Producer: Jon Hopkins

Jon Hopkins chronology
Music for Psychedelic Therapy (2021)	Ritual (2024)

Ritual is the seventh studio album by English electronic musician and producer Jon Hopkins. It was released on 30 August 2024 by Domino. Developed from music Hopkins had originally composed for the Dreamachine immersive installation, the album was conceived as a continuous 41-minute piece divided into eight parts. It features contributions from Vylana, 7RAYS, Ishq, Clark, Leo Abrahams, Emma Smith, Daisy Vatalaro and Cherif Hashizume. The album received generally favourable reviews from critics and reached number 51 on the UK Albums Chart.

== Background and release ==
In 2022, Hopkins composed music for Dreamachine, a large-scale immersive artwork inspired by Brion Gysin's 1959 Dreamachine device. The project used flickering light and spatial audio for audiences experiencing it with their eyes closed, and toured the United Kingdom as part of the Unboxed programme that year. Hopkins later revisited that material and expanded it into a standalone album during the second half of 2023.

Ritual was announced on 30 April 2024 alongside the release of the excerpt "Ritual (Evocation)". Before the album's commercial release, Hopkins presented it in full at immersive listening sessions at the Institute of Contemporary Arts, London, on 12 May 2024, using the venue's spatial audio system. Writing in the Financial Times, Kate Hutchinson described these events as part of a series of listening sessions that Hopkins held during summer 2024.

== Composition ==
Ritual is structured as a single uninterrupted work spread across eight titled chapters. Hopkins described it as ceremonial but non-prescriptive, saying that the ritual suggested by the music would differ from listener to listener. In interviews around the release, he contrasted the album's stronger rhythmic emphasis with Music for Psychedelic Therapy, while continuing to describe the music as introspective rather than dancefloor-oriented.

Reviewers described the album as an ambient-leaning work with a gradual structural build. The Guardian noted beatless drones, twinkling electronics and wordless vocals, with the rhythmic pulse arriving midway through the album rather than functioning as club-oriented propulsion. Resident Advisor described the work as moving from chimes and bells toward a central climax before ending with a piano-led conclusion. Pitchfork characterised it as a composition in which sustained strings, floating synthesizers and restrained percussion blurred the line between acoustic and electronic sound.

== Critical reception ==
Professional ratings
Aggregate scores
Source	Rating
Metacritic	74/100
Review scores
Source	Rating
The Guardian	3/5 stars
Spill Magazine	6/10
The Skinny	3/5 stars
Under the Radar	8.5/10
Pitchfork	6.5/10

Ritual received generally favourable reviews from music critics. At Metacritic, which assigns a weighted average score out of 100 to reviews from mainstream critics, the album received a score of 74 based on 13 reviews.

Under the Radar gave the album 8.5 out of 10, describing it as "an album experience unlike any other". Resident Advisor called the album "ingeniously crafted" and argued that it heightened the senses and encouraged reflection. In The Guardian, Alexis Petridis wrote that the album's strongest passages arrived in the middle sections, especially "Evocation" and "Solar Goddess Return", though he found the overall experience "congenial and diverting rather than transformative". The Skinny awarded three stars out of five, while Spill Magazine gave 6 out of 10. Andrew Ryce of Pitchfork gave the album 6.5 out of 10, describing it as richly textured and carefully composed, but more restrained than Hopkins's earlier club-oriented albums.

== Track listing ==
All tracks are written by Jon Hopkins.

No.	Title	Length
1.	"Part I – Altar"	4:43
2.	"Part II – Palace / Illusion"	7:41
3.	"Part III – Transcend / Lament"	3:30
4.	"Part IV – The Veil"	3:14
5.	"Part V – Evocation"	4:55
6.	"Part VI – Solar Goddess Return"	4:48
7.	"Part VII – Dissolution"	6:37
8.	"Part VIII – Nothing Is Lost"	5:42
Total length:		41:10

== Charts ==
Ritual reached number 10 on the Scottish Albums Chart, number 51 on the UK Albums Chart and number 5 on the UK Independent Albums Chart.

Chart	Peak position
Scottish Albums Chart	10
UK Albums Chart	51
UK Independent Albums Chart	5

== Personnel ==
Credits adapted from Bandcamp album credits, Domino's album announcement, Pitchfork's release report, and release metadata.

Musicians

- Jon Hopkins – composition, production, mixing
- Christopher Clark – additional production, mixing
- Vylana – vocals
- 7RAYS – drums, analogue synthesizers
- Emma Smith – viola, violin
- Daisy Vatalaro – cello
- Leo Abrahams – guitar
- Cherif Hashizume – modular synthesis, mixing
- Matt Hillier – Shepard tones
- Experiments in Silence – additional sounds

Technical

- Jamison Baken – recording engineer
- Matt Colton – mastering

Artwork

- Matthew Cooper – layout
- Stephen McNally – artwork
