= Womb (album) =

Studio album by Purity Ring
- Released: April 3, 2020
- Genre: Futurepop; dream pop; synth-pop
- Length: 35:57
- Label: 4AD
- Producer: Corin Roddick; Megan James

Purity Ring chronology
Another Eternity (2015)	Womb (2020)	Graves (2022)

Singles from Womb
- 1. "Stardew" Released: February 18, 2020

Professional ratings
Aggregate scores
Source	Rating
Metacritic	72/100
Review scores
Source	Rating
AllMusic	4/5 stars
Exclaim!	7/10
Pitchfork	7.3/10
Clash	8/10 stars

Womb (stylized in all caps) is the third studio album by Canadian electronic music duo Purity Ring. It was released through 4AD on April 3, 2020. It was preceded by the lead single "Stardew". The duo was scheduled to tour North America in support of the album from May to September 2020, but it was postponed to 2021 due to the COVID-19 lockdowns.

== Background ==
Prior to the announcement of the album, the duo launched a website containing a hidden maze that revealed the song "Pink Lightning". A press release stated that the album "chronicles a quest for comfort and the search for a resting place in a world where so much is beyond our control".

== Track listing ==
All tracks are written by Corin Roddick and Megan James. "Peacefall" co-written by Jonas Bjerre.

Womb track listing
No.	Title	Length
1.	"Rubyinsides"	3:33
2.	"Pink Lightning"	4:14
3.	"Peacefall"	4:16
4.	"I Like the Devil"	2:55
5.	"Femia"	3:07
6.	"Sinew"	3:11
7.	"Vehemence"	3:47
8.	"Silkspun"	3:35
9.	"Almanac"	3:13
10.	"Stardew"	4:06
Total length:		35:57

Note

- The LP version includes a 50 second bonus "hidden" track on the B-side after "Stardew".

== Personnel ==
Purity Ring

- Megan James – vocals,
- Corin Roddick – production, mixing, engineering

Additional personnel

- Greg Calbi – mastering
- Steve Fallone – mastering
- Cecil Frena – engineering
- Eric Cheng – engineering
- Murray Nelson – artwork
- Chris Svensson – graphic design
- Tallulah Fontaine – illustrations

== Charts ==
Sales chart performance for Womb
Chart (2020)	Peak position
Scottish Albums (OCC)	77
US Billboard 200	195
US Top Alternative Albums (Billboard)	23
US Top Dance Albums (Billboard)	1
