= Singularity (Jon Hopkins album) =

Studio album by Jon Hopkins
- Released: 4 May 2018
- Genre: Electronic; IDM; microhouse; ambient
- Length: 62:10
- Label: Domino
- Producer: Jon Hopkins

Jon Hopkins chronology
Immunity (2013)	Singularity (2018)	Music for Psychedelic Therapy (2021)

Singles from Singularity
- 1. "Emerald Rush" Released: 6 March 2018; 2. "Everything Connected" Released: 25 April 2018; 3. "Singularity" Released: 4 May 2018; 4. "C O S M" Released: 7 September 2018; 5. "Luminous Beings" Released: 1 March 2019

Singularity is the fifth studio album by English electronic musician and producer Jon Hopkins, released on 4 May 2018 through Domino Records.

It was announced on 6 March 2018, with the release of the first single, "Emerald Rush". The second single, "Everything Connected", was released on 25 April, while the third, "Singularity", was released on 4 May, along with the album.

The album follows Hopkins's companion previous album, Immunity. It was released to critical acclaim and was nominated at the 2019 Grammy Awards for Best Dance/Electronic Album.

== Critical reception ==
Professional ratings
Aggregate scores
Source	Rating
AnyDecentMusic?	8.0/10
Metacritic	84/100
Review scores
Source	Rating
AllMusic	4.5/5 stars
The A.V. Club	A
The Guardian	2/5 stars
The Irish Times	4/5 stars
Mixmag	9/10
Mojo	4/5 stars
NME	5/5 stars
Pitchfork	8.3/10
Q	4/5 stars
Uncut	7/10

Singularity received widespread acclaim from critics upon its release. At Metacritic, which assigns a normalised rating out of 100 to reviews from mainstream publications, the album received an average score of 84, based on 26 reviews, indicating "universal acclaim". It received critical acclaim from a few publications including NME, and The Skinny, who each attributed it a perfect score.

musicOMH gave the album high praise, saying: "From the beginning this is music that sweeps the listener away, an aural massage that takes care of the hair standing on end at the top of the head to the pair of heels itching to start moving on the dance floor." XLR8R compared the album to Hopkins' previous album Immunity, saying: "Hopkins' merging of emotional material with hypnotic, physical grooves appeared effortless. Singularity continues in the vein of Immunity, though its depth of feeling is greater, and rhythmic power more potent." AllMusic was more positive of Singularity than Hopkins' previous album Immunity, stating: "...filled with frayed feedback, skillfully crafted beats, and gentle piano melodies, as well as the occasional breathy vocals. This time out, there seems to be an extra shot of adrenaline added, and the album seems to reflect a deeper spiritual quest, both inwards and outwards." Stephen Carlick of Exclaim! praised the album saying, "It's an album that, in its best moments, finds one of electronic music's great minds operating in peak form."

The Observer was critical of the album, saying: "Too often, though, you’re left wishing for the thuggish bass and head-severing hi-hats of less cerebral dance music. There’s not enough food for the brain or fuel for the feet here".

== Track listing ==
All tracks are written by Jon Hopkins.

No.	Title	Length
1.	"Singularity"	6:29
2.	"Emerald Rush"	5:36
3.	"Neon Pattern Drum"	6:07
4.	"Everything Connected"	10:30
5.	"Feel First Life"	5:33
6.	"C O S M"	7:08
7.	"Echo Dissolve"	3:21
8.	"Luminous Beings"	11:51
9.	"Recovery"	5:35
Total length:		62:10

== Personnel ==
- Jon Hopkins – music, record producer, engineering, mixing

Additional Personnel

- Leo Abrahams – guitar (track 1), orchestra choir (track 5)
- Emma Smith – strings (track 1, 2, 4, 5, 8)
- Sasha Lewis – programming (track 1 to 4)
- London Voices – choir (track 5)
- Jon Thorne – double bass (track 4)
- Lisa Elle – vocals (track 2)
- Josephine Stephenson – vocals (track 5)
- Olivia Chaney – vocals (track 5)
- Oliver Griffiths – vocals (track 5)
- Ben Perry – chorus masters (track 5)
- Terry Edwards – chorus masters (track 5)
- Austin Tufts – drum (track 8)

== Charts ==
Chart (2018)	Peak position
Australian Albums (ARIA)	44
Austrian Albums (Ö3 Austria)	39
Belgian Albums (Ultratop Flanders)	11
Belgian Albums (Ultratop Wallonia)	48
Dutch Albums (Album Top 100)	56
German Albums (Offizielle Top 100)	31
Irish Albums (IRMA)	21
Italian Albums (FIMI)	63
New Zealand Heatseeker Albums (RMNZ)	6
Scottish Albums (OCC)	6
Swiss Albums (Schweizer Hitparade)	21
UK Albums (OCC)	9
UK Dance Albums (OCC)	1
UK Independent Albums (OCC)	1
US Top Dance Albums (Billboard)	11
