= Insides (Jon Hopkins album) =

Studio album by Jon Hopkins
- Released: 5 May 2009
- Recorded: 2008–2009 (Cafe Music Studios, London, UK, United Kingdom)
- Genre: Electronic, ambient, ambient pop
- Length: 48:24
- Label: Domino

Jon Hopkins chronology
Contact Note (2004)	Insides (2009)	Small Craft on a Milk Sea (2010)

Insides is the third studio album by English musician and producer Jon Hopkins. Released on 5 May 2009, it reached No. 15 on the Billboard Dance/Electronic Album Chart in 2009. PopMatters listed the album as one of the top ten electronic albums of 2009.

== Overview ==
=== Production ===
Hopkins's third album, Insides, was released by Domino Records on 5 May 2009. Musicians Lisa Lindley-Jones, Leo Abrahams, Emma Smith, Davide Rossi, and Vince Sipprell contributed to the studio recordings. Insides included the track "Light Through the Veins," which had previously been used on the Coldplay album Viva la Vida or Death and All His Friends. Some of the tracks had been written by Hopkins sporadically since his last release, while others were based on the music he had composed for the Entity production commissioned by choreographer Wayne McGregor in 2008.

=== Reception ===
Insides charted at No. 15 on the Billboard Dance/Electronic Albums chart. PopMatters listed the album as one of the top ten electronic albums of 2009.

=== Reviews ===
Professional ratings
Aggregate scores
Source	Rating
Metacritic	75/100
Review scores
Source	Rating
AllMusic	3/5 stars
musicOMH	4/5 stars
PopMatters	8/10
Q	3/5 stars
The Skinny	4/5 stars
Sputnikmusic	4/5
Tiny Mix Tapes	4/5 stars

The album received positive reviews from sources such as PopMatters, AllMusic, and the BBC. Paul Clarke of the BBC wrote that "Hopkins [is] capable of producing music as epic, soaring and emotional as any power ballad in his own way though. Take "Light Through the Veins" for example...a close relative of Ulrich Schnauss' "In All the Wrong Places", it's a majestic piece of widescreen shoegazing which grows ever more expansive throughout its entire ten-minute duration...no amount of reflected glory could ever fully illuminate Insides' mysterious depths."

According to other reviews, the album "takes its cues from ambient electronica, but uses strings and piano, along with some very tasty beats and dubstep-influenced bass on some tracks." Alan Ranta of Tiny Mix Tapes stated the album "strikes me as his single most aggressive release yet. His sense of timing, the clarity of his production, and the variety of effects he employs draw you into the story that each instrumental tells. Jon Hopkins is not a button-pushing man of presets; he is a bona fide composer and a trained pianist. Craftsmanship sets him apart, and allows Insides to be as incredibly moving as it is and always will be."

== Track listing ==
1. "The Wider Sun" – 2:37
2. "Vessel" – 4:44
3. "Insides" – 4:40
4. "Wire" – 4:43
5. "Colour Eye" – 5:13
6. "Light Through the Veins" – 9:21
7. "The Low Places" – 6:37
8. "Small Memory" – 1:43
9. "A Drifting Up" – 6:29
10. "Autumn Hill" – 2:40

== Personnel ==
- Leo Abrahams – electric guitar, hurdy-gurdy
- Lee Muddy Baker – drumming (track 6)
- King Creosote – humming (track 9)
- Lisa Lindley-Jones – additional vocals (track 9)
- Davide Rossi – electric violin (track 2)
- Emma Smith – violin
- Vince Sipprell – viola

== Charts ==
Chart (2009)	Peak position
US Dance/Electronic Albums (Billboard)	15
