= East Forest =

American musical group

- Origin: Portland, Oregon, United States
- Genres: Ambient, Electronic, Contemporary Classical, Indie Pop
- Years active: 2008–present
- Label: Aquilo Records
- Members: Trevor Oswalt
- Website: eastforest.org

East Forest (real name Trevor Oswalt) is an American ambient/electronic/contemporary classical/indie pop artist from Portland, Oregon, United States.

== Discography ==
=== Studio albums ===
- The Education Of The Individual Soul (2008)
- Music Meditations (2010)
- Love Bomb (2012)
- Orbits (2014)
- Elements (2016)
- Ritual Mystical (2016)
- Held (2016)
- Cairn (2017)
- Music For Mushrooms: A Soundtrack For The Psychedelic Practitioner (2019)
- Ram Dass (2019)
- Reworks (2019)
- Still (2020)
- Spores (2020)
- Possible (2021)
- IN: A Soundtrack for the Psychedelic Practitioner Vol II (2021)

=== EPs ===
- Port Landers (2011)
- Crystal Starship (2011)
- Prana (2013)
- Music To Die To (2016)
- Music To Be Born To (2016)
- Held / Kindred (2017)

=== Other ===
- Leela (2011)
