= Small Craft on a Milk Sea =

Studio album by Brian Eno with Leo Abrahams and Jon Hopkins
- Released: 19 October 2010
- Recorded: 2009–2010
- Genres: Electronic, ambient, experimental rock
- Length: 49:03
- Language: Instrumental
- Label: Warp
- Producer: Brian Eno

Brian Eno chronology
| Making Space (2010) | Small Craft on a Milk Sea (2010) | Drums Between the Bells (2011) |

Leo Abrahams chronology
| The Grape and the Grain (2009) | Small Craft on a Milk Sea (2010) |

Jon Hopkins chronology
| Insides (2009) | Small Craft on a Milk Sea (2010) | Monsters soundtrack (2010) |

Small Craft on a Milk Sea is a 2010 album by British musician and record producer Brian Eno. The album—his debut with Warp—was released in Japan on 19 October 2010, in the United States on 2 November, and the United Kingdom on 15 November. The album was recorded with collaborators Jon Hopkins and Leo Abrahams in 2009 and 2010 and was released in several formats, including compact disc, digital download, a box set featuring the album on compact disc, vinyl, and download, a bonus CD with four extra tracks and a lithograph by Eno, and another box set with all of the previous media and a 12" square silkscreen print by Eno and a copper plate.

== Recording ==
Small Craft on a Milk Sea was recorded in collaboration with Abrahams and Hopkins in 2009 and 2010. Some sessions were recorded in September 2009, while Abrahams recorded his own album and performed with David Byrne on the Songs of David Byrne and Brian Eno Tour to promote Everything That Happens Will Happen Today. The trio also entered the studio in April 2010, to record music that was rejected from the film soundtrack to The Lovely Bones and five of those tracks ended up on Small Craft on a Milk Sea. The music recorded for this album was mostly improvised and inspired by the sound of soundtrack albums and film scores; some of the songs were composed by choosing random chords played for arbitrary intervals with improvised electronic parts on top of the melody and then edited together to make a proper song. When the music was recorded for the album, Eno sequenced it to create a "macro-composition" that contains themes that run throughout the album.

News broke of the proposed Eno album in July 2010; the following month, Abrahams prematurely leaked details of the album, including the fact that Eno had signed to Warp to release the project. On 30 September 2010, Eno released the track "2 Forms of Anger" for free streaming on the Internet to promote the album and followed this with "Horse" on 15 October. On 18 October, "Emerald and Stone" was made available for previewing.

== Seven Sessions on a Milk Sea ==
Abrahams, Eno, and Hopkins also recorded a series of performance films featuring brand new improvised compositions to promote the album. A new piece was released each week for seven weeks, each with a unique partner website from a different nation. The first to go live were "Instant Nuclear Family" with Japan's Rockin'On and "Signal Success" with The New York Times. The track listing for the seven sessions can be found below.

== Reception ==
Professional ratings
Aggregate scores
| Source | Rating |
|---|---|
| Metacritic | 73/100 |
Review scores
| Source | Rating |
| AllMusic | 4/5 stars |
| The A.V. Club | B |
| Chicago Tribune | 2/4 stars |
| Drowned in Sound | 7/10 |
| The Guardian | 3/5 stars |
| The Independent | 4/5 stars |
| Pitchfork | 7.4/10 |
| PopMatters | 9/10 |
| Rolling Stone | 3.5/5 stars |
| Spin | 8/10 |

Small Craft on a Milk Sea was received positively by critics. Metacritic gave the album an aggregate score of 72 based on 34 reviews, indicating generally favourable reception. PopMatters gave the album 9 out of 10, writing the album "...gives us the classically transportive experience that Brian Eno excels in creating". Andy Gill of The Independent wrote in a four-star review, "It's territory he's explored many times before... But at their best, as with the haunted De Chirico space of "Calcium Needles", these pieces are powerfully evocative". Also in a four-star review, John Bush of AllMusic wrote that "Eno may be trading on his earlier developments in ambience to a small degree, but Small Craft on a Milk Sea is a good and proper balance of curiosity and expression". Pitchfork was critical of the less ambient pieces, writing that "The 'active' category yields mixed results, occasionally sounding overindulged or dated", but praised the album as a whole, saying "When taken as little slivers of a larger poem, Small Craft on a Milk Sea's song titles present the listener with a notion of the past, present, and future existing as one holistic entity. With Brian Eno, you have a man who sounds uncompromisingly like all three". Chart magazine and the Chicago Tribune were less enthusiastic, giving the album 2.5 out of 5 and 2 out of 4 respectively.

== Track listing ==
All compositions by Brian Eno, Leo Abrahams and Jon Hopkins.

1. "Emerald and Lime" – 3:02
2. "Complex Heaven" – 3:05
3. "Small Craft on a Milk Sea" – 1:49
4. "Flint March" – 1:56
5. "Horse" – 3:02
6. "2 Forms of Anger" – 3:15
7. "Bone Jump" – 2:22
8. "Dust Shuffle" – 1:54
9. "Paleosonic" – 4:25
10. "Slow Ice, Old Moon" – 3:25
11. "Lesser Heaven" – 3:21
12. "Calcium Needles" – 3:25
13. "Emerald and Stone" – 2:12
14. "Written, Forgotten" – 3:55
15. "Late Anthropocene" – 8:09

Bonus track on Japanese edition

16. "Invisible" – 5:10

iTunes Store bonus track

16. "Loose Rein" – 3:17

Collector's edition bonus disc

1. "Surfacing" – 2:19
2. "Square Chain" – 2:36
3. "Bimini Twist" – 3:13
4. "Abandoned Ship" – 3:45

Bonus disc available through Rough Trade

1. "Square Chain" – 2:36
2. "Bimini Twist" – 3:13
3. "Invisible" – 5:10

Seven Sessions on a Milk Sea

1. "Instant Nuclear Family" – 3:02
2. "Signal Success" – 3:55
3. "Written / Forgotten / Remembered" – 2:30
4. "Allen Loop" – 1:16
5. "Abdominal Crisis" – 3:55
6. "Big Thief Trudge" – 1:27
7. "Instant Nuclear Family"(Extended Version) – 7:54

== Personnel ==
- Leo Abrahams – guitar, laptop, and guitaret
- Brian Eno – computers, electronics
- Jon Hopkins – piano, keyboards, electronics

Additional personnel

- Nick Robertson – design, art direction, photography
- Jez Wiles – percussion on "Flint March", "Horse", "2 Forms of Anger", and "Dust Shuffle"
