= Cecil Frena =

- Also known as: Born Gold
- Origin: Edmonton, Alberta, Canada
- Genres: Futurepop, indietronica, electronic music, experimental music
- Years active: 2010 - present

Cecil Frena is a Canadian singer, songwriter, and pop music experimentalist from Edmonton. Previously, Frena made music under the name Gobble Gobble, before he made the change in 2011 to Born Gold. His first album, Bodysongs, was released mid-2011. His second album, Little Sleepwalker, was released the following year. His third album, I Am An Exit, was released on 8 October 2013. On 31 August 2017, Cecil Frena announced the end of Born Gold, alongside the release of Unknow Yourself published under his own name.

== Discography ==
=== As Born Gold ===
- 2011: Bodysongs
- 2012: Little Sleepwalker
- 2013: I Am An Exit
- 2015: No Sorrow Video Series

=== As Cecil Frena ===
- 2017: The Gridlock
- 2019: PIT BOSS
