= Jon Hopkins =

English electronic musician and producer (born 1979)

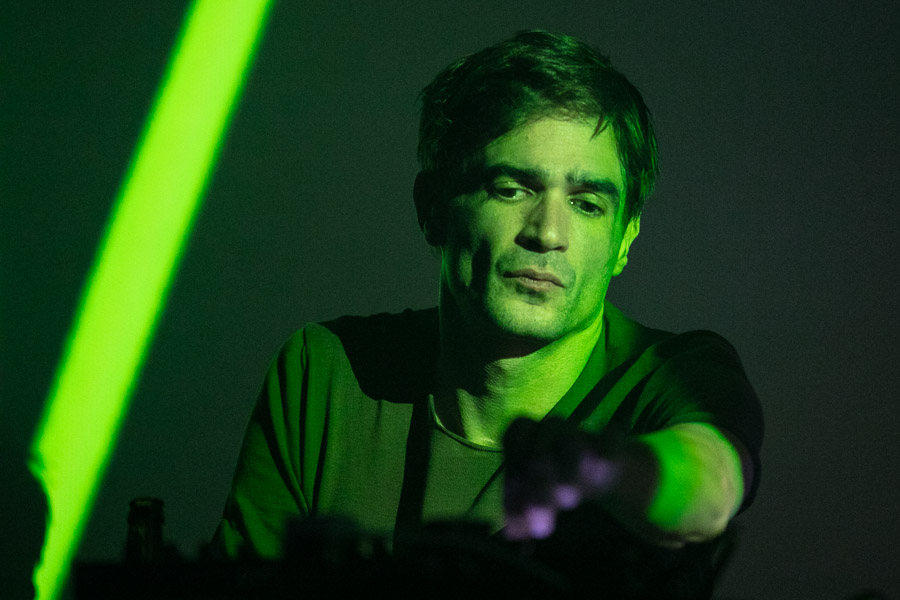
- Hopkins performing in 2018

Background information
- Born: Jonathan Julian Hopkins; 15 August 1979 (age 47); Kingston upon Thames, England
- Genres: Electronic; IDM; ambient; contemporary classical; tech house
- Occupations: Producer; musician; composer
- Instruments: Keyboards; organ; piano; harmonium
- Years active: 1997–present
- Labels: Just Music; Domino; Double Six
- Website: jonhopkins.co.uk

Jonathan Julian Hopkins (born 15 August 1979) is an English electronic musician and producer. He began his career playing keyboards for Imogen Heap, and he has produced and contributed to albums by Brian Eno, Coldplay, and David Holmes, among others.

Hopkins composed the soundtrack to the 2010 film Monsters, which was nominated for an Ivor Novello Award for Best Original Score. His third studio album, Insides, reached No. 15 on the US Dance/Electronic Albums chart in 2009. His collaborations on Small Craft on a Milk Sea with Brian Eno and Leo Abrahams and Diamond Mine with King Creosote both reached No. 82 on the UK Albums Chart. His albums Diamond Mine (2011) and Immunity (2013) were both nominated for the Mercury Prize. His fifth studio record, Singularity, received a Grammy nomination for Best Dance/Electronic Album in December 2018. Hopkins's sixth studio album, Music for Psychedelic Therapy, comprising ambient music, was released on 12 November 2021.

== Early life and education ==
Jon Hopkins was born in 1979 in Kingston upon Thames and grew up in nearby Wimbledon. He first became aware of electronic music after hearing early house music on the radio at the age of seven or eight, and also became a fan of Depeche Mode and the Pet Shop Boys. These records inspired an early fascination with synths.

At the age of 12, Hopkins began studying piano at the Junior Department of the Royal College of Music in London, where he continued until age 17. The composers that were greatly influential to him whilst studying were Ravel and Stravinsky, and he eventually won a competition to perform a concert of Ravel's Piano Concerto in G with an orchestra. For a time Hopkins considered becoming a professional pianist, only to decide classical performance was too formal and unnerving to pursue full-time.

As a teenager he also listened to acid house, early hardcore, grunge, as well as electronic artists such as Acen, Seefeel, and Plaid. When Hopkins was 14, he got his first computer, an Amiga 500, and started programming MIDI material. By the age of 15, he had saved up enough money from winning piano competitions to buy a low-level professional Roland synth, and on this he began creating his first full-length electronic compositions.

== Career ==
=== 1997–2004: Early years ===
After finishing his final exams at age 17, Hopkins accompanied his friend Leo Abrahams to an audition for Imogen Heap's backing band. Hopkins decided to audition as well, and was hired to handle both keyboard and samples, while Abrahams was hired as guitarist. He toured with the new band for the entirety of 1998.

In 1999, Hopkins signed with boutique London label Just Music as a solo artist, and began recording his debut album Opalescent. At the time he was also working part-time as a studio session musician. Opalescent attracted positive press attention upon its release, and several tracks were licensed to Sex and the City. The Guardian reviewed it as "a beautifully realised debut... Using synth oozes, phased and echoed guitars and pianos and chilled beats, his wonderful tunes drift from calm to eerie power like a restless sea... It will delight any lovers of beautiful music." DJ Magazine gave it 4/5 stars, and stated "Piano, guitar strings and slow beats blend like the clouds at sunset (or an opiate smoothy) filtering in and out like elegantly wasted beauty. Darker drums add a further depth."

Hopkins released his second album, Contact Note, on Just Music in 2004 while still working as a studio musician. The album slowly gained an underground following but failed to take off, and led Hopkins to become disillusioned with his solo career, and take a break from writing to learn how to become a producer.

=== 2004–2007: Work with Brian Eno and Coldplay ===
By 2004, Abrahams had been collaborating for some time with ambient musician and producer Brian Eno. Abrahams played some of Hopkins' second record for Eno, and Eno invited him to join them for a jam session. On the first day of their collaboration they came up with some of the music for Eno's upcoming album Another Day on Earth, and Hopkins became a long-term collaborator. Shortly afterwards Hopkins produced King Creosote's album Bombshell, which initiated his relationship with the Fence Collective. He also co-wrote tracks with DJ and composer David Holmes for Holmes' Holy Pictures album, and remixed for James Yorkston.

In 2007, Hopkins was invited by Eno, who was producing Coldplay's upcoming album Viva la Vida or Death and All His Friends, to join the band in the studio for a day. Hopkins ended up staying and contributing to the album for the next year, co-producing several tracks and playing organs, harmoniums, and other keyboard instruments on others. The intro to the track "Violet Hill" came from an improvisation with Hopkins and Davide Rossi, the album's string arranger. Throughout this period Hopkins was periodically creating his own solo tracks, and his song "Light Through the Veins" was adapted to serve as the introduction to the album's first track "Life in Technicolor". "Light Through the Veins" was also picked by the band to serve as the backing for the track "The Escapist", which is hidden at the end of the album. Viva la Vida was released in 2008, and won Best Rock Album at the 2009 Grammy Awards and became the best-selling album of 2008. Coldplay asked Hopkins to serve as the pre-show DJ and opening act for their 2008 world tour. Hopkins toured with the band for six months through England, the United States, and Japan. He performed at venues including Madison Square Garden and the London O2 Arena, with crowds as large as 20,000 people.

=== 2008–2013: Entity; production ===
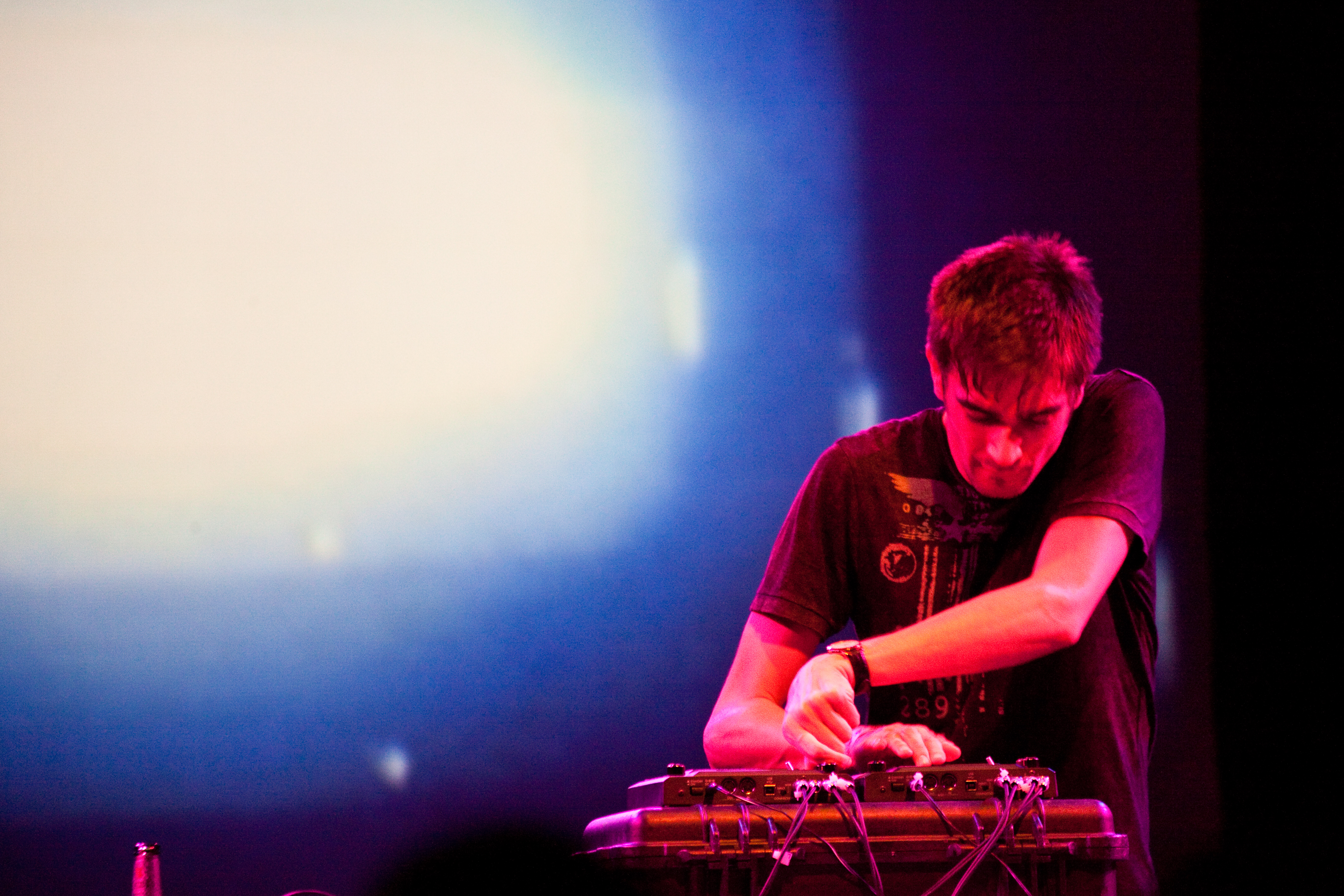
Hopkins performing live in 2009

In 2008, Hopkins was commissioned by choreographer Wayne McGregor to compose music for Entity, a production of McGregor's "Random Dance" group. Entity was performed live at Sadler's Wells in April 2008 to critical acclaim. A world tour followed throughout 2008 and 2009.

Hopkins also has co-writing or producing credits on albums by artists such as David Holmes and Dan Arborise. He is also known for remixing a variety of artists, including Wild Beasts, Nosaj Thing, Imogen Heap, Four Tet, and James Yorkston. He was also one of the few producers chosen by Radio 1's Rob Da Bank to remix film director David Lynch's first electronica release, "Good Day Today" / "I Know", which was released on Sunday Best Records.

=== 2008–2009: Insides ===
Hopkins signed to Domino Recording Company in late 2008. Hopkins's third album, Insides, was released by Domino Records on 5 May 2009. It included the track "Light Through the Veins", which had previously been used on the Coldplay album, Viva la Vida or Death and All His Friends. Some of the tracks had been written by Hopkins sporadically since his last release, while others were based on the music he had composed for the Entity production. Hopkins developed an intense live show to support the release, resulting in club and festival performances across Europe and the United States. He secured supporting slots with The xx, Röyksopp, and Four Tet. Many of his live shows used background visuals featuring the animations of Vince Collins.

Insides charted at No. 15 on the Billboard Dance/Electronic Albums chart. PopMatters listed the album as one of the top ten electronic albums of 2009. According to reviews, the album "takes its cues from ambient electronica, but uses strings and piano, along with some very tasty beats and dubstep-influenced bass on some tracks." TinyMixTapes stated the album

strikes me as his single most aggressive release yet. His sense of timing, the clarity of his production, and the variety of effects he employs draw you into the story that each instrumental tells. Jon Hopkins is not a button-pushing man of presets; he is a bona fide composer and a trained pianist. Craftsmanship sets him apart, and allows Insides to be as incredibly moving as it is and always will be. It will easily be one of the best electronic albums of 2009.

Paul Clarke of the BBC wrote that

Hopkins [is] capable of producing music as epic, soaring and emotional as any power ballad in his own way. Take "Light Through The Veins" for example ... a close relative of Ulrich Schnauss' "In All the Wrong Places", it's a majestic piece of widescreen shoegazing which grows ever more expansive throughout its entire ten-minute duration ... no amount of reflected glory could ever fully illuminate Insides' mysterious depths.

=== 2009–2013: Pure Scenius, film scores ===
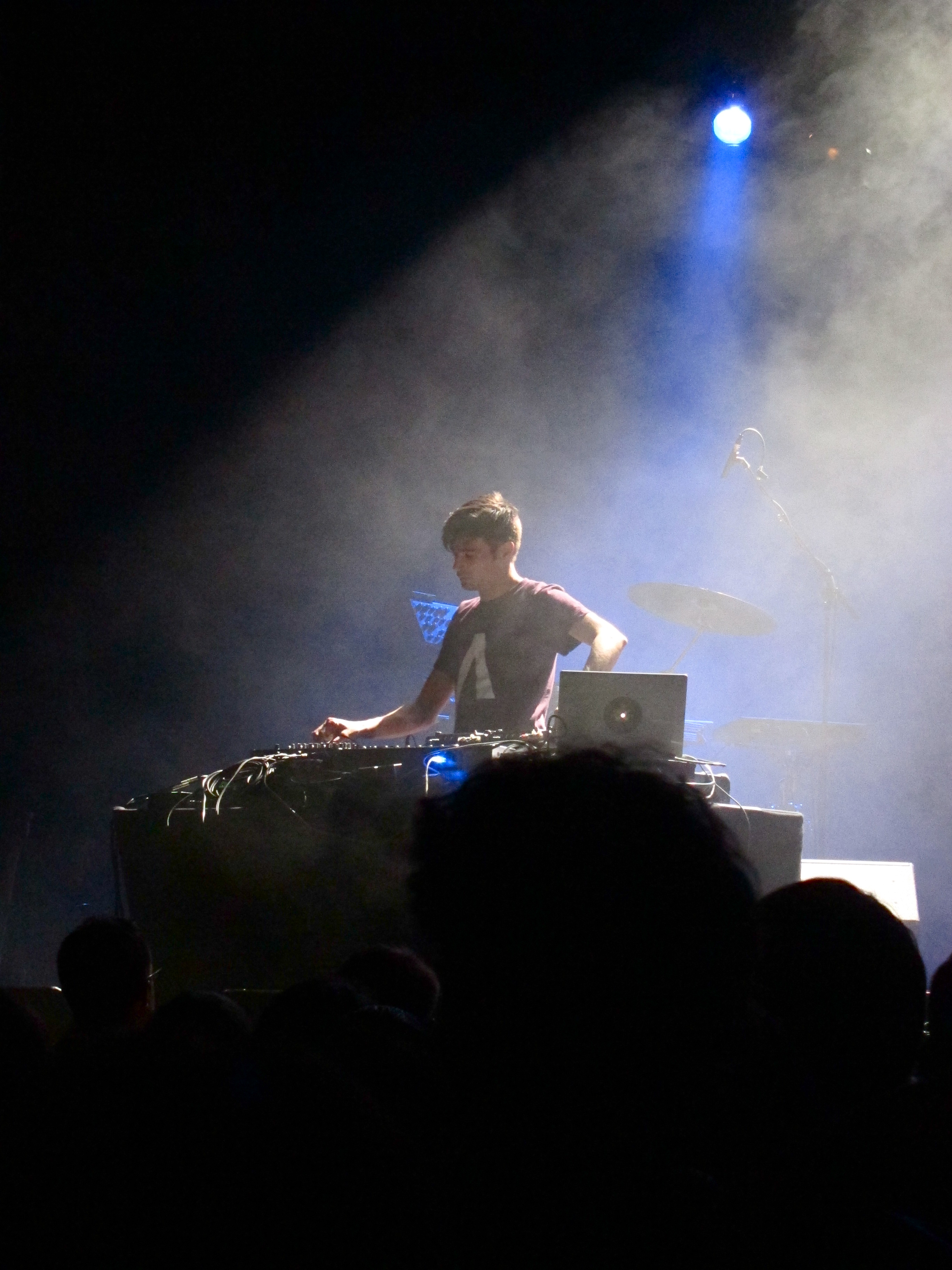
Hopkins performing live in 2011

In June 2009, Hopkins was invited by Brian Eno to play some solo shows at the Luminous Festival at the Sydney Opera House. A few weeks prior to leaving, Eno asked Hopkins to join with himself, Underworld's Karl Hyde, Leo Abrahams, and the Sydney-based improv trio the Necks in the group "Pure Scenius", the planned finale for the Luminous Festival. They then improvised music based on pre-planned themes, putting on three 1½-hour shows in the Opera House with Hyde on vocals. Pure Scenius was repeated a year later in Brighton, when Eno was curating the Brighton Festival.

Also in 2009, Hopkins collaborated with Brian Eno and Leo Abrahams to score the Peter Jackson film The Lovely Bones. In early 2010, Hopkins composed the score for the short film Rob and Valentyna in Scotland directed by Eric Lynne, which won an honourable mention for the short film-making award at Sundance. Also in 2010, Hopkins was commissioned to create the soundtrack for the British science fiction film Monsters, which was directed by Gareth Edwards. To create the score, Hopkins partly used string parts performed by arranger Davide Rossi and guitar by Leo Abrahams. The soundtrack album was released on 29 November 2010 on Domino Records. In 2011, the score was nominated for an Ivor Novello Award for Best Original Score.

=== 2009–2012: Collaborations ===
Hopkins collaborated with Tunng on the EP Seven Gulps of Air in 2009, which was commissioned by designer Christopher Kelly for London Fashion Week. Seven Gulps of Air was listed as one of Drowned in Sound's singles of the year.

In 2010, Hopkins collaborated with Leo Abrahams and Brian Eno to create the album Small Craft on a Milk Sea. Released on Warp Records in late 2010, the album is based on a three-week session of improvisation wherein the artists recorded about six hours of material a day.

In 2011, Hopkins collaborated with Scottish musician King Creosote to create the album Diamond Mine, which featured lyrics and vocals by Creosote sung over musical backdrops arranged and recorded by Hopkins. The album was a culmination of about seven weeks of work spread over seven years of recording and collaboration, from whenever the two artists had the opportunity to get together. The album was released on 28 March 2011 to acclaim, which included a glowing review from NPR. On 19 July 2011, Hopkins and Anderson were announced as nominees for the 2011 Barclaycard Mercury Prize, which is annually awarded for best album from the United Kingdom and Ireland.

Also in 2011, the EP Honest Words, a Hopkins collaboration with King Creosote, was released on Domino Records. In April 2012, this was followed by another collaboration with King Creosote: The Jubilee, also on Domino.

Hopkins wrote the score for the 2013 film by Kevin Macdonald, How I Live Now.

=== 2013: Immunity ===
"[Hopkins] created the album's warm, alive feel by shunning digital perfection in favor of the analog synthesis of original sounds, both electronic and physical. The ambient prelude of the haunting, scrambled glitch-house opener 'We Disappear'—a key unlocks the door of Hopkins' London studio and his footsteps lead in—is more than idle window dressing: He is ushering us into the tactile space that suffuses the record. He drums on desks, plays salt shakers, slows down serendipitous recordings of nearby fireworks, boosts the kick-drummed rattle of a window."
— Pitchfork Media

Immunity is Hopkins' fourth studio album, released on 4 June 2013, by Domino Records. Among the artists that contributed vocals were long-time collaborator King Creosote, and Corin Roddick and Megan James of the band Purity Ring. It was recorded and produced in Hopkins' London studio, with Hopkins often using homemade sound effects or the natural sound of the room. Stated MixMag, "Immunity is an album of organic techno and exquisite mini-symphonies."

Immunity peaked at No. 13 on the Billboard Top Electronic Albums chart in the United States. In Britain, it was nominated for the 2013 Mercury Prize for best album. The album met with a largely positive reception among critics, receiving perfect scores from Mixmag and MusicOMH, and 4/5 from The Guardian. Pitchfork Media described Immunity as a "remarkably visceral, sensual, confident electronic record," and MusicOMH called it a "modern classic".

The video for the single "Open Eye Signal" directed by Aoife McArdle won best cinematography at the UK Music Video Awards.

=== 2014–present: Asleep Versions, Singularity, and Music for Psychedelic Therapy ===
In 2014, Hopkins co-produced the song "Midnight" for Coldplay's 2014 album Ghost Stories, and released an EP titled Asleep Versions on 10 November. The EP includes (according to Domino Records) "four decelerated, dreamlike re-imaginings" of four tracks featured on his album Immunity. The EP has additional vocals from Raphaelle Standell-Preston of the band Braids & regular collaborator King Creosote, and artwork from Robert Hunter.

Hopkins' fifth studio album, Singularity, was released on Domino Records on 4 May 2018. It was nominated for the Grammy award for Best Dance/Electronic Album. Hopkins' sixth studio album, Music for Psychedelic Therapy, was released on 12 November 2021. It comprises ambient music designed to accompany psychedelic trips, including a track incorporating words from the spiritual leader Ram Dass. In 2024, he released the album Ritual.

== Live performances ==
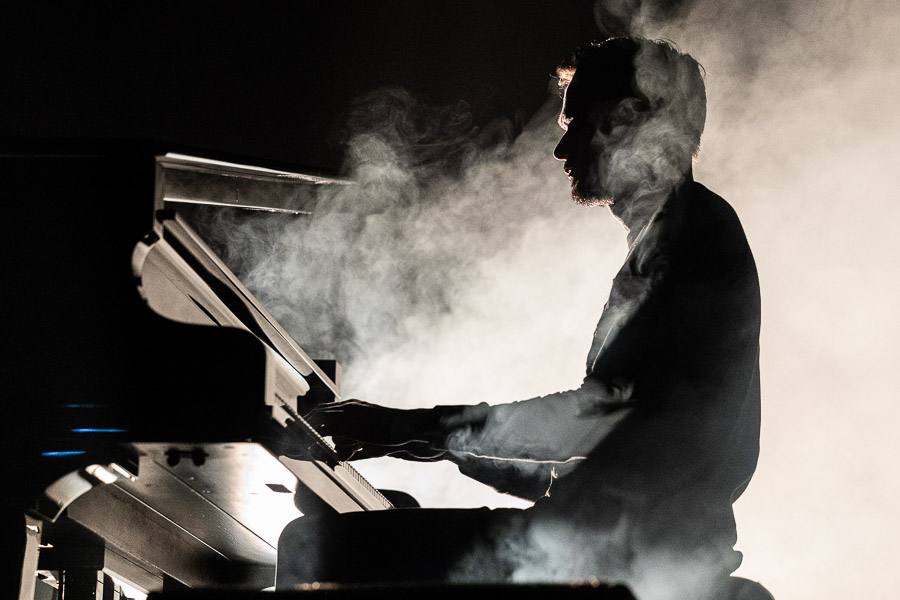
Hopkins live in 2022 at Sentrum Scene, Oslo.

Hopkins has performed at music festivals such as Moogfest, Mutek, Beacons Festival, and Electric Zoo, and at venues such as Madison Square Garden and the London O2 Arena. As of 2014 he maintains a regular touring schedule both in England and internationally, playing at the Glastonbury Festival in June, with upcoming dates at the Pitchfork Music Festival, Electric Picnic and Time Music Festival and in 2015 at Wonderfruit in Thailand for the premiere of the iy_project, a collaboration with light artist, Chris Levine.

== Style and equipment ==
=== Style and genre ===
According to reviews, "Hopkins's aesthetic is perpetually intriguing. He transcends genres, melding digital coldness with subtle, bucolic textures; veering from skewed elegance to strange, unsettling depths." "He makes powerfully emotive, instrumental music that consistently crosses genres, ranging from solo acoustic piano to explosive, bass-heavy electro." Also, he "meticulously constructs lush, downtempo arrangements, blending digital beats and soothing ambience."

=== Equipment and software ===
As of September 2010, his studio setup relies on a Logic system, though all his previous releases were on Cubase VST, used in conjunction with an old version of SoundForge. He began using Logic because his old system was not powerful enough to include the video for film soundtracks. His live setup includes Ableton Live and a chain of up to five Kaoss Pads.

== Personal life ==
Hopkins practices autogenic training and Transcendental Meditation, of which he says, "For me, it's not about relaxing. It can get music flowing in a way that's really uninhibited, and I want to spend as much time in that place as possible."

== Discography ==
Studio albums

- Opalescent (2001)
- Contact Note (2004)
- Insides (2009)
- Immunity (2013)
- Singularity (2018)
- Music for Psychedelic Therapy (2021)
- Ritual (2024)
