= Purity Ring (band) =

Canadian electropop duo

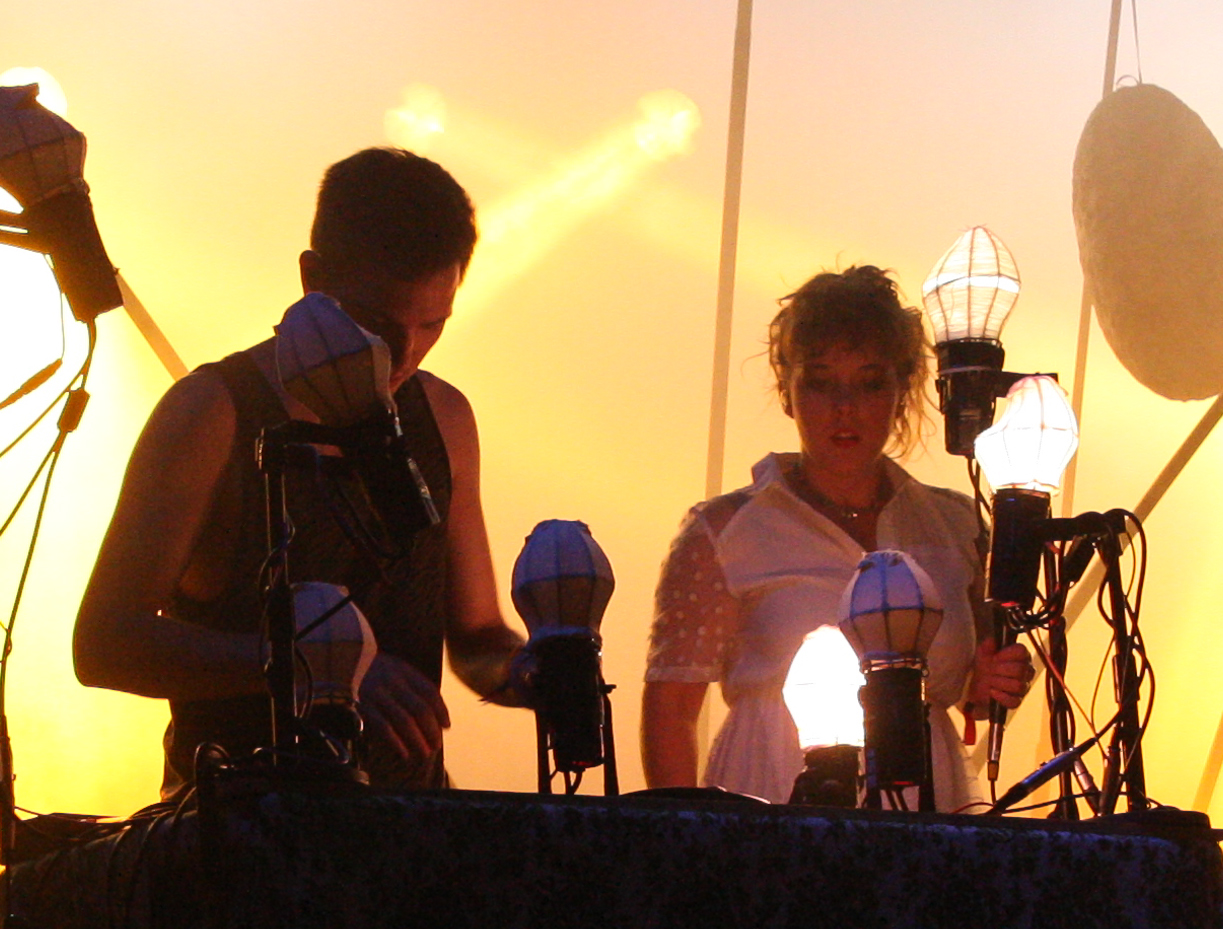
- Purity Ring performing in 2013

Background information
- Origin: Edmonton, Alberta, Canada
- Genres: Futurepop; synth-pop; dream pop; witch house
- Years active: 2010–present
- Labels: 4AD; Last Gang
- Members: Corin Roddick; Megan James
- Website: purityringthing.com

Purity Ring are a Canadian electronic pop duo from Edmonton, Alberta, formed in 2010. They consist of multi-instrumentalist/producer Corin Roddick and vocalist Megan James. They released their debut album, Shrines, in 2012, to critical acclaim, followed by Another Eternity in 2015, Womb in 2020, and Purity Ring in 2025.

== History ==
=== 2010–2013: Formation and Shrines ===
The band were originally members of the band Gobble Gobble. While on tour with them, Roddick began experimenting with electronic production and beat-making. James was asked to sing on a track called "Ungirthed", thus forming Purity Ring. The song was released in January 2011.

On April 3, 2012, it was announced that Purity Ring were signed by record company 4AD worldwide and Last Gang Records in Canada. Later the same month the band released their first official single "Obedear", along with the announcement of their debut album, Shrines, which was released on July 24, 2012. The album peaked at 32 on the Billboard 200, selling 90,000 copies in the US as of February 2015. It was ranked 24th on Pitchfork's staff lists top 50 albums of 2012 and became short listed for the 2013 Polaris Music Prize the following year. Later that year, they released a collaboration titled "Belispeak II" with rapper Danny Brown.

In February 2013, the band released a cover of Soulja Boy's "Grammy" as a free download in celebration of the opening of their official online store. Fan reaction to the release was so strong that it crashed the website servers due to too many requests to download. Later that year they released a remix of Lady Gaga's "Applause" for the song's digital remix EP.

=== 2014–2016: Another Eternity ===
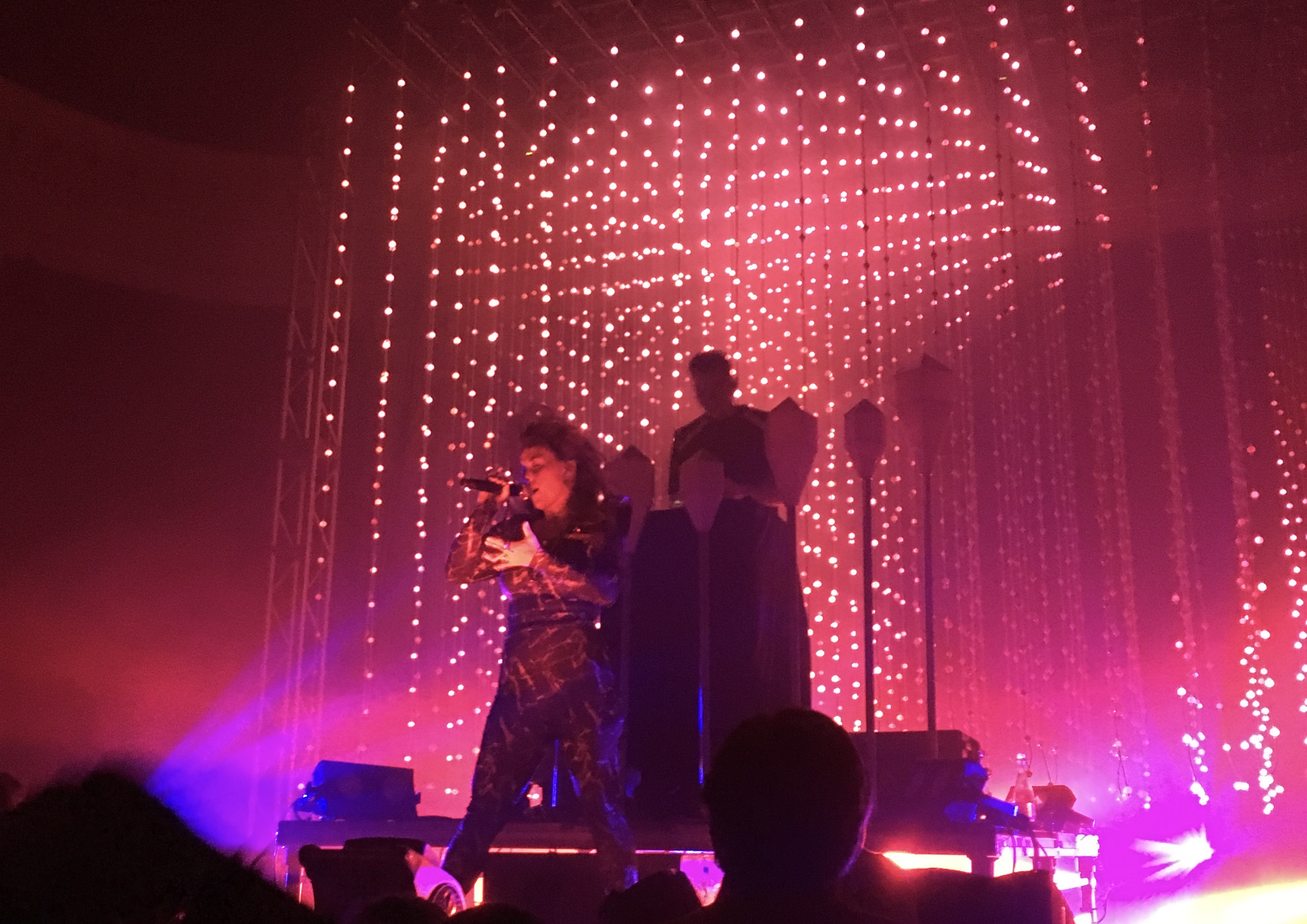
Purity Ring performing in 2016

In February 2014, the duo announced it was working on a second studio album. The band collaborated again with Danny Brown on his third studio album Old. On December 3, 2014, the group released the lead single from the album, "Push Pull". On February 26, Another Eternity became fully available to stream online via NPR Music's First Listen. The album was released in March 2015. It charted at number 25 on the Canadian Albums Chart, becoming the band's first album to chart there, and number 26 on the Billboard 200. On January 19, 2016, the band performed live on Conan. In April 2016, they also performed at Coachella in Indio, California.

=== 2017–2024: WOMB and Graves EP ===
On April 30, 2017, while performing at Fortress Festival, it was announced that the band would be taking a break from touring to record new material. The band co-wrote and produced three songs on Katy Perry's 2017 album Witness.

On July 24, 2017, on the 5th anniversary of their debut album Shrines, the group released a new single titled "Asido". According to Purity Ring, this song is "a standalone offering", suggesting that it would not be featured on its possible new record.

In August 2018, an unreleased Purity Ring song was featured in the trailer for Netflix's television series The Innocents, speculated to be titled "Bitter Rhymes".

In February 2020, the band posted a link to an interactive puzzle/website that rewarded fans with a song called "Pink Lightning". The duo's third album, Womb, was released on April 3, 2020. It was announced alongside the release of the lead single, titled "Stardew". In March 2020, the band released "Pink Lightning" as a single, as well as another single called "Peacefall", which features backing vocals from Mew vocalist Jonas Bjerre.

In June 2022, the band released a new EP called graves, which consists of seven songs. On July 22, Purity Ring announced they would be releasing the tenth anniversary reissue of Shrines on July 29. The reissue, titled Shrines X, features three previously unreleased B-sides. On July 26, 2023, the band released a new song called "Shines", which was created in conjunction with Black Dresses.

=== 2025–present: Purity Ring ===
On June 5, 2025, the band released two new songs: "Many Lives" and "Part II". On July 10, 2025, the band released the single "Place of My Own" alongside announcements for a new self-titled album set to be released on September 26, 2025, and a headlining North American tour in the autumn of 2025 to support the album. It was "inspired by video games such as Final Fantasy X and NieR: Automata", being designed to "emulate an accompanying soundtrack for a role-playing game, with two digital avatars of the duo setting off on a 'journey to build a kinder world amid the ruins of a broken one.'"

On April 16, 2026, Megan James announced the start of a solo project called MMJ with the intention of opening up for Purity Ring's 2026 North American tour with a performance.

In July 2026, they released "Bitter Rhymes", the song which had featured in the 2018 trailer for The Innocents, with the band revealing it was initially written in 2014 for The Hunger Games: Mockingjay – Part 1.

== Style and impact ==
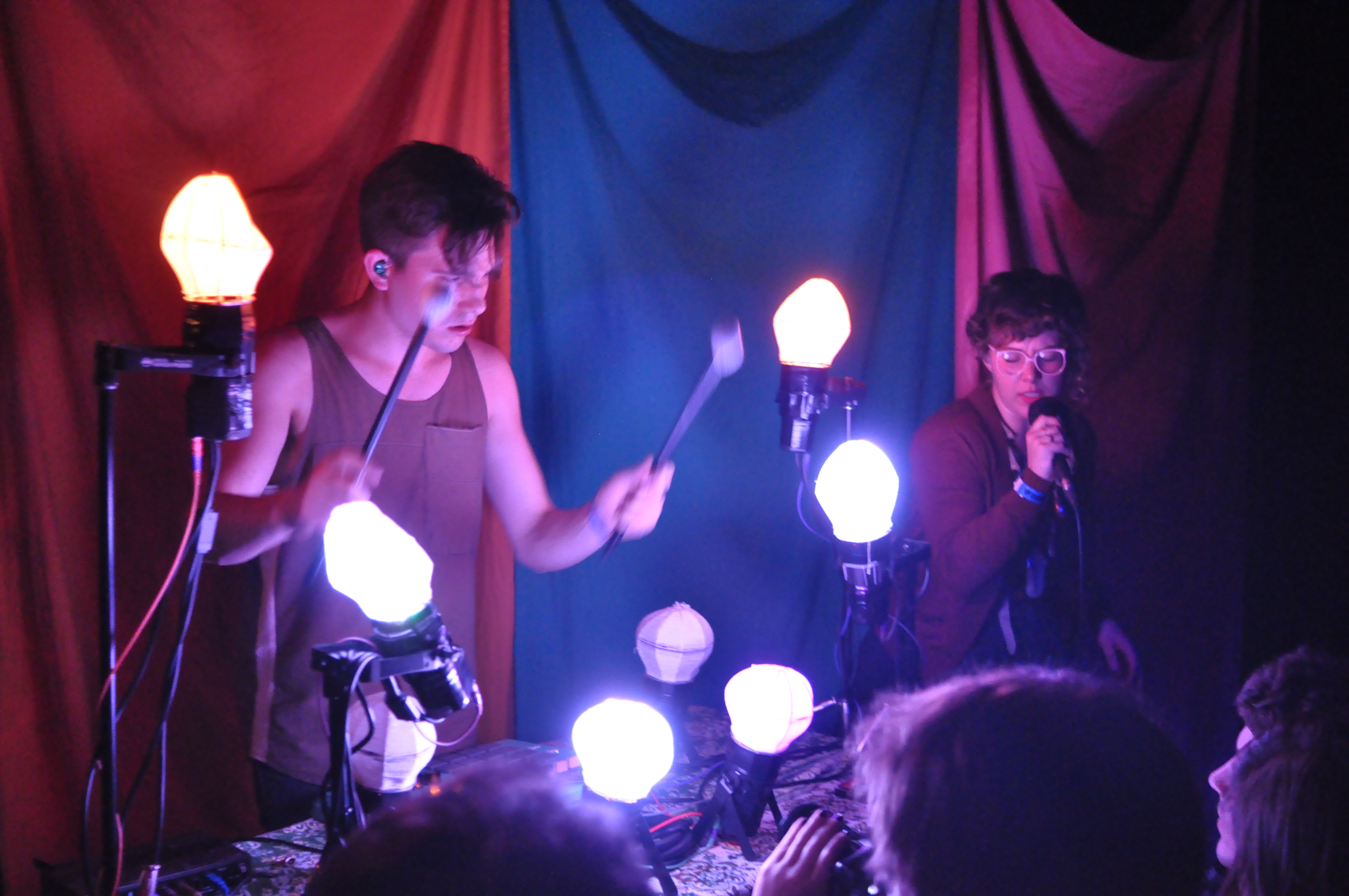
Corin Roddick (left) and Megan James (right) performing live in 2012.

Purity Ring's music is known for its combination of pop and hip-hop styles and James' "childlike" vocals and "macabre", "gory" lyrics, that she takes from "books and books full of things she's written" in the past. Their music utilizes down-pitched, distorted vocals and percussive and vocal loops. A creative key to their sound is a sometimes aggressive use of a volume regulating technique called “side-chaining,” in which the rhythm of one instrument affects the volume of another. Genres that have been used to label the band include synth-pop, dream pop, trip hop, and witch house, while the band describes themselves as "future pop". While their debut album was recorded separately with Roddick sending instrumentals to James over email to record vocals over, Another Eternity was the first time they recorded entirely in the studio together. During live shows, both wear clothes custom designed and sewn by James, and Roddick uses a custom-built, tree-shaped instrument to drive both live sound and lighting.

Pitchfork described Shrines as "a definitive time capsule for the sound of 2012 (and 2013)". "Grandloves", off Shrines, was sampled on Playboi Carti's song "Fell In Luv".

== Members ==
- Corin Roddick – instruments, production (2010–present)
- Megan James – vocals (2010–present), production (2020–present)

== Discography ==
Albums

- Shrines (2012)
- Another Eternity (2015)
- Womb (2020)
- Purity Ring (2025)

EPs

- Graves (2022)

== Awards and nominations ==
2016: Berlin Music Video Awards, nominated in the Best Art Director category for 'HEARTSIGH'
