= Jane Weaver =

English singer, songwriter, and guitarist

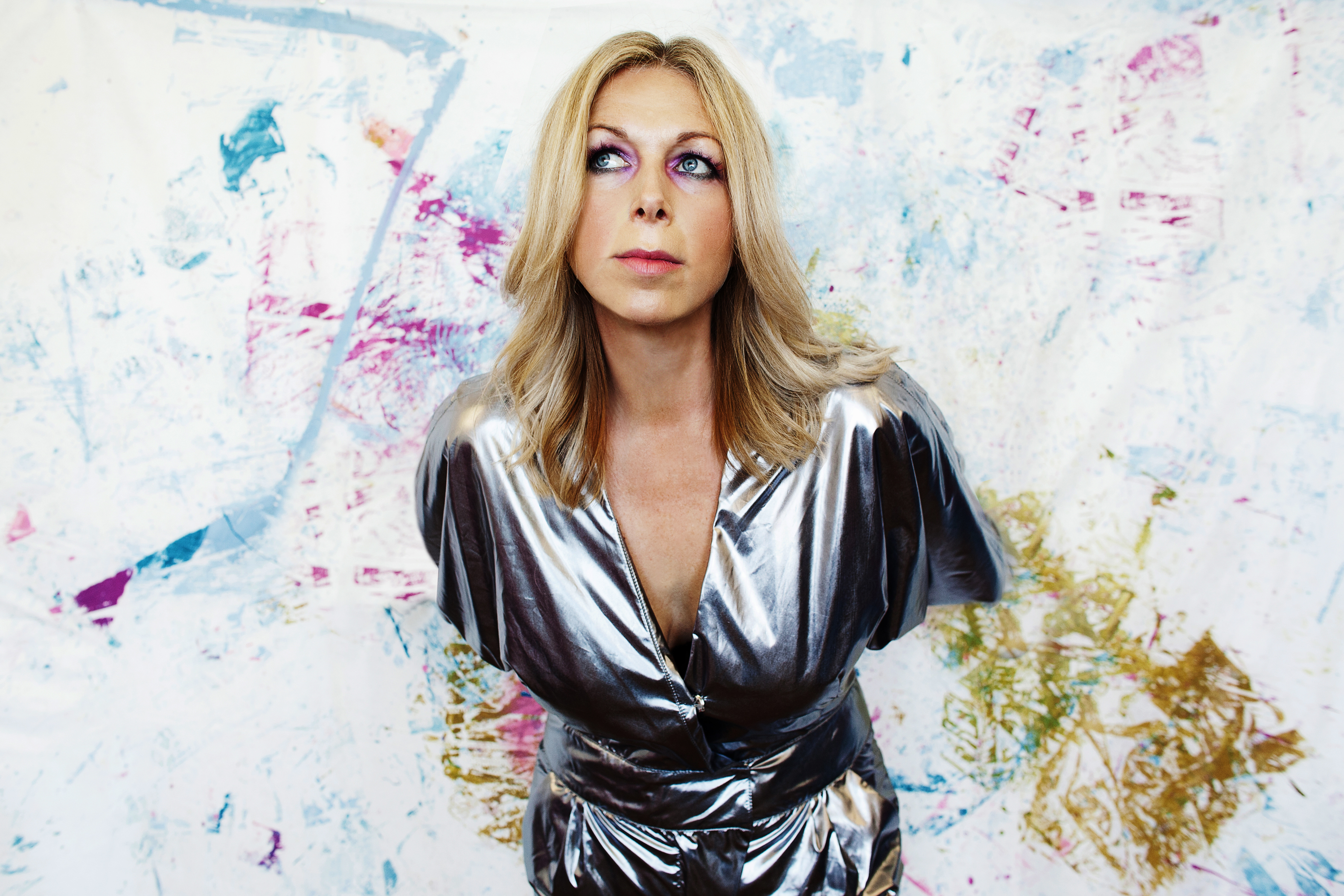
- Weaver in 2021

Background information
- Born: Jane Louise Weaver; 28 February 1972 (age 54); Liverpool, England
- Origin: Widnes, England
- Genres: Acoustic; psychedelic folk; alternative rock; electronica
- Occupations: Singer; songwriter; composer; musician
- Instruments: Vocals; guitar
- Years active: 1993–present
- Labels: Fire; Bird; Finders Keepers; Bright Star Recordings
- Formerly of: Kill Laura; Misty Dixon
- Website: janeweavermusic.com

Jane Louise Weaver (born 28 February 1972) is an English singer, songwriter, and guitarist. She runs the label Bird Records, an offshoot of Twisted Nerve Records. Weaver has performed as part of the Britpop group Kill Laura, the folktronica project Misty Dixon, and as a solo artist. She was brought up in the town of Widnes, Cheshire.

== Childhood and early career ==
Weaver was born in Liverpool and grew up in Widnes, Cheshire. As a child she was impacted by Kate Bush; the first album she purchased was Bush's The Kick Inside (1978). Weaver was thereafter gifted a Bontempi keyboard on which she would play along to records by Tubeway Army, Ultravox and OMD. As she grew older, Weaver began listening to indie rock and metal.

The band Kill Laura began when Weaver was in sixth form college. Between 1992 and 1997 Kill Laura released seven singles, two on Klee and five on the Manchester Records label run by Rob Gretton, owner of The Haçienda and manager of New Order. Kill Laura disbanded in 1997.

Weaver formed Misty Dixon in 2002. The band originally consisted of Weaver, Anna Greenwood, Dave Tyack and Sam Yates. Misty Dixon released several singles, and one studio album, Iced to Mode (2003). However, the release of the album was shrouded in tragedy following the disappearance of Tyack in August 2002. Misty Dixon broke-up in 2004.

== Solo career ==
Weaver's solo career began shortly after the demise of Kill Laura. She recorded an album for Manchester Records in 1998, Supersister, but it was left unreleased following the death of Gretton in May 1999. A single, "Everyone Knows Everyone Else", recorded in collaboration with Doves and Andy Votel, was released from the Supersister sessions.

Weaver continued her solo career alongside Misty Dixon. Following a number of singles Weaver's first studio album, Like an Aspen Leaf, was released in 2002. It featured contributions from Andy Votel, Dave Tyack, Rick Tomlinson, Sam Yates, Naomi Hart and two members of Elbow, Craig Potter and Richard Jupp.

Weaver appears on the cover artwork of the 2002 Badly Drawn Boy studio album, Have You Fed the Fish?.

Her second album, Seven Day Smile (2006) was a collection of home recordings and material from the Supersister era. By the time of her third album, Cherlokalate (2007), Weaver was exploring more psychedelic folk and Americana influences. The NME review of Cherlokalate (2007) declared that "Jane Weaver is the sound of Cat Power if she'd grown up next door to Oasis, stealing their Beatles records and outshining them at the school Christmas concert".

The Fallen by Watchbird, Weaver's fourth album, was released in 2010. The Guardian wrote "Psych folk is back. It may have died out with the hippies in the 1970s, but now it has merged with folktronica, and the result here is not as twee and pretentious as one might fear… Weaver's fragile, unworldly voice is carefully balanced against more muscular backing". The album also received a four (out of five) star review in Mojo. Weaver wrote a fairytale book to accompany the album. A remix album, The Watchbird Alluminate (2011), featured interpretations by electronic artists including Demdike Stare and the Focus Group.

In 2011, Weaver recorded the library music recording Intiaani Kesä for filmmaker and fashion designer Paola Suhonen of the brand Ivana Helsinki. A track from the project, "Parade of the Blood Red Sorrows", was also featured in the 2012 film Kiss of the Damned.

The title of Weaver's sixth album, The Silver Globe (2014), is derived from the 1988 film On the Silver Globe by Andrzej Żuławski. It featured contributions from Cybotron, Badly Drawn Boy and David Holmes. Her song "The Electric Mountain" uses a sample of "Star Cannibal" from Church of Hawkwind (1982). The Silver Globe was critically acclaimed as an artistic breakthrough and named Piccadilly Records Album of the Year 2014.

Coldplay's song "Another's Arms", from Ghost Stories (2014), featured a vocal sample from The Fallen by Watchbird album track, "Silver Chord". Weaver said that Chris Martin telephoned her directly for permission to use it.

2015's The Amber Light album is an extension of The Silver Globe, with three remixes from that album alongside four new songs and three instrumentals. It was made available both with the "Deluxe Version" of The Silver Globe and as a separate release.

Another album, Modern Kosmology was released in 2017, with Can vocalist Malcolm Mooney performing guest vocals on the track, "Ravenspoint".

During October and November 2018, Weaver completed the short "Loops in the Secret Society" solo tour of England and Scotland, in support of her two most recent albums. Loops in the Secret Society was also the title of her double album released in June 2019 by Fire Records. The album contained reimagined and remixed versions of songs from her two previous albums. The deluxe bookback CD edition, released on 15 November, also contained a DVD featuring the experimental film installation which was featured on her previous tour. It was directed by Nick Farrimond. The first single from the album, "Slow Motion (Loops Variation)", was released in March 2019.

Together with Peter Philipson and Raz Ullah, under the name of Fenella, Weaver recorded a reimagined soundtrack to the 1981 cult animated movie Fehérlófia by Hungarian director Marcell Jankovics. The album was released on vinyl only on 8 November 2019 on Fire Records. A second Fenella album, titled The Metallic Index, was released on 11 November 2022 also on Fire Records.

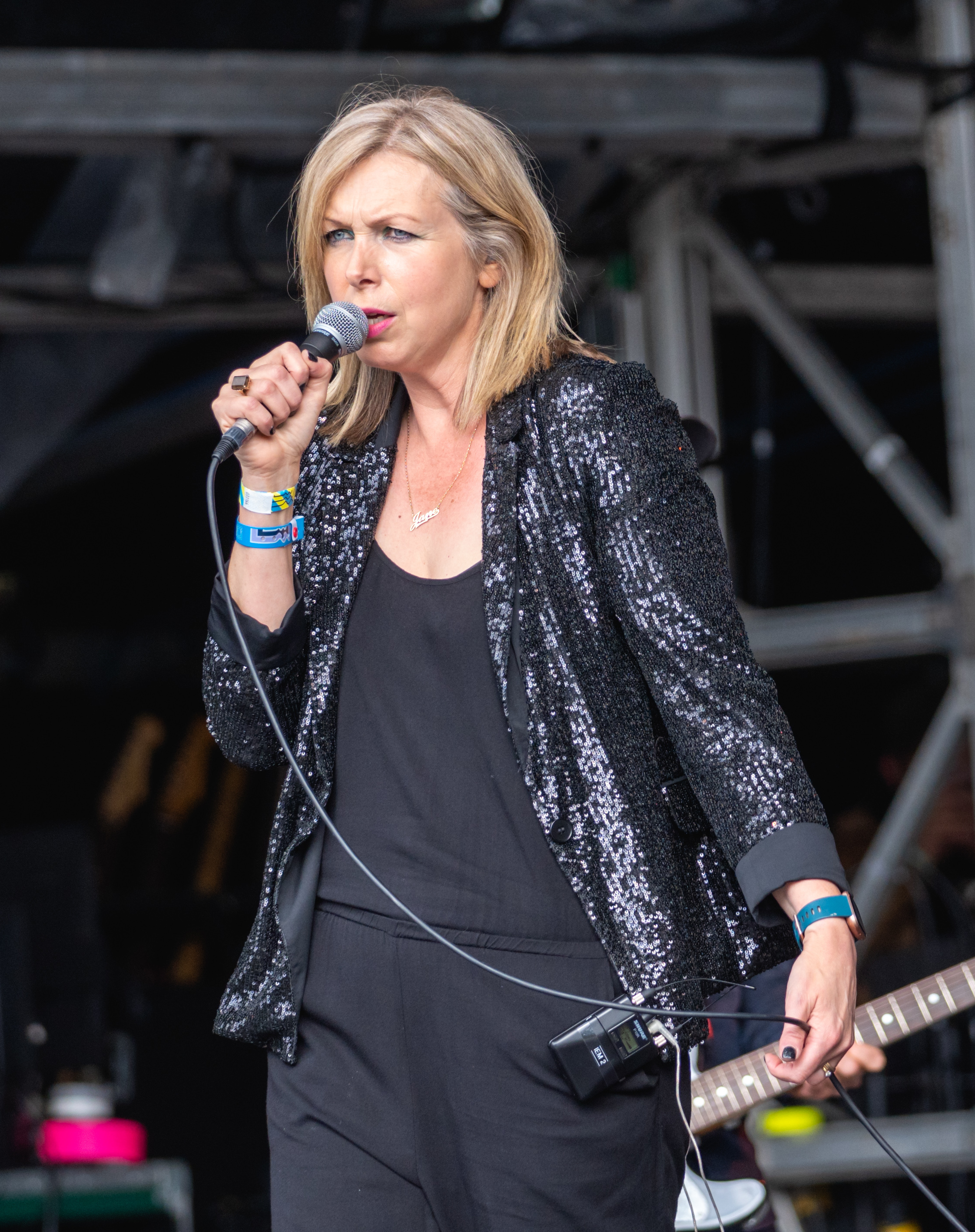
Jane Weaver at the South Facing Festival 2021

Weaver released a single in October 2020 entitled "The Revolution of Super Visions", from her forthcoming album Flock. A second single, "Heartlow", and official video were released in January 2021. The album was released in March 2021 to favourable reviews, Rough Trade also made Flock their 'Album of the Month'. On release week, the album peaked at No. 24 in the UK Albums Chart, the first time that Weaver has entered the Top 40. Weaver also announced in October 2020 that she had a UK tour planned for June 2021. The tour was rescheduled in March 2021 to November 2021 and February/March 2022 due to the COVID-19 pandemic.

"Love in Constant Spectacle" is the title of a song and official video released in November 2023, which was followed by two other tracks titled "Perfect Storm" in January 2024 and "Romantic Worlds" in February 2024. Weaver also announced in January 2024 that the title of her new album is Love in Constant Spectacle. It was released on 5 April 2024. The album was produced in collaboration with John Parish. Following the release of the album Weaver toured the UK and Ireland in April and May 2024.

In 2026, Weaver participated in the BBC Proms at the Royal Albert Hall. Accompanied by the BBC Concert Orchestra, she sang "Northern Lights" and "Nights in White Satin", as part of the Proms' Prog Rock: A Fanfare for the Common Man night.

== Bird Records ==
Bird Records is an offshoot of Twisted Nerve Records and the Finders Keepers reissue label, and is run by Weaver. Bird was founded in 2002 and mainly releases recordings by contemporary female folk artists. These include early recordings by Beth Jeans Houghton and Emma Tricca.

In 2007, they released the compilation album, Bearded Ladies. The album brought together both contemporary and vintage psychedelic folk female singers including Brigitte Fontaine, Bonnie Dobson, Susan Christie and Cate Le Bon. The album spawned a club night at the Dulcimer bar in Chorlton-cum-Hardy, Manchester. Weaver, and many of the artists who featured on Bearded Ladies, performed at the 2007 Meltdown festival, which was curated by Jarvis Cocker of Pulp as part of the 'Lost Ladies of Folk' event.

== Personal life ==
Weaver is married to Andy Votel, and has two children.

== Discography ==
Albums

- Like an Aspen Leaf (mini album) (2002)
- Seven Day Smile (2006)
- Cherlokalate (2007)
- The Fallen by Watchbird (2010)
- The Watchbird Alluminate (2011)
- Le Rose De Fer/Intiaani Kesä (Soundtrack, with Pierre Ralph) (2013)
- The Silver Globe (2014)
- The Amber Light (2015)
- Modern Kosmology (2017)
- Loops in the Secret Society (2019)
- Fehérlófia (2019) (By Fenella – Soundtrack, with Peter Philipson & Raz Ullah)
- Flock (2021)
- Sunset Dreams EP (EP) (2021)
- The Metallic Index (2022) (by Fenella, with Peter Philipson & Raz Ullah)
- Love in Constant Spectacle (2024)
