= Elemental (Demdike Stare album) =

Compilation album by Demdike Stare
- Released: February 27, 2012
- Genre: Dark ambient, ambient dub
- Length: 114:55
- Label: Modern Love
- Producer: Sean Canty, Miles Whittaker

Demdike Stare chronology
Iris (2012)	Elemental (2012)

Professional ratings
Aggregate scores
Source	Rating
Metacritic	85/100
Review scores
Source	Rating
AllMusic	4/5 stars
Beats Per Minute	70%
Drowned in Sound	8/10
Mojo	4/5 stars
Pitchfork	7.9/10
Resident Advisor	4/5
Sputnikmusic	4/5
Tiny Mix Tapes	4.5/5 stars

Elemental is a compilation album by Demdike Stare, released on February 27, 2012, by Modern Love Records. It compiles the group's last three EPs, including Chrysanthe & Violetta, Rose and Iris.

== Track listing ==
All music is composed by Sean Canty and Miles Whittaker.

Disc one
No.	Title	Length
1.	"New Use for Old Circuits"	5:04
2.	"Mephisto's Lament"	5:23
3.	"Kommunion" (alternate version)	8:28
4.	"Unction" (alternate version)	5:04
5.	"Mnemosyne"	5:24
6.	"Shade"	3:20
7.	"In The Wake Of Chronos" (alternate version)	5:52
8.	"10th Floor Stairwell"	3:47
9.	"Violetta"	6:40
10.	"Metamorphosis"	6:51

Disc two
No.	Title	Length
1.	"All This Ours (Sunrise)"	7:16
2.	"Erosion of Mediocrity"	7:09
3.	"Nuance"	7:41
4.	"Falling Off The Edge" (alternate version)	10:24
5.	"Dauerlinie"	5:37
6.	"Dasein"	6:24
7.	"We Have Already Died"	7:04
8.	"Ishmael's Intent"	7:23

== Personnel ==
Adapted from the Elemental liner notes.

Demdike Stare

- Sean Canty – producer
- Miles Whittaker – producer

Production and additional personnel

- Radu Prepeleac – design
- Andy Votel – cover art

== Release history ==
Region	Date	Label	Format	Catalog
United Kingdom	2012	Modern Love	CD	LOVE077
