= Tryptych (album) =

Compilation album by Demdike Stare
- Released: January 24, 2011
- Recorded: 2010
- Genre: Dark ambient, ambient dub
- Length: 160:32
- Label: Modern Love
- Producer: Sean Canty, Miles Whittaker

Demdike Stare chronology
Voices of Dust (2010)	Tryptych (2011)	Chrysanthe & Violetta (2011)

Professional ratings
Aggregate scores
Source	Rating
Metacritic	83/100
Review scores
Source	Rating
AllMusic	5/5 stars
Cokemachineglow	81%
Fact	4/5 stars
Mojo	4/5 stars
Pitchfork	8.3/10
PopMatters	6/10
Sputnikmusic	5/5
Tiny Mix Tapes	4.5/5 stars
Uncut	4/5 stars

Tryptych is a compilation album by Demdike Stare, released on January 24, 2011, by Modern Love Records. It compiles the group's 2010 releases, including Forest of Evil, Liberation Through Hearing and Voices of Dust.

== Track listing ==
All music is composed by Sean Canty and Miles Whittaker.

Disc one
No.	Title	Length
1.	"Forest of Evil" (Dusk)	14:30
2.	"Forest of Evil" (Dawn)	10:19
3.	"Quiet Sky"	3:38

Disc two
No.	Title	Length
1.	"Caged in Stammheim"	5:18
2.	"Eurydice"	8:08
3.	"Regolith"	6:00
4.	"The Stars Are Moving"	8:36
5.	"Bardo Thodol"	5:35
6.	"Matilda's Dream"	11:13
7.	"Nothing But the Night 2"	4:54
8.	"Library of Salomon Book 1"	4:38
9.	"Library of Salomon Book 2"	9:39

Disc three
No.	Title	Length
1.	"Black Sun"	2:28
2.	"Hashshashin Chant"	6:20
3.	"Repository of Light"	11:21
4.	"Of Decay & Shadows"	2:37
5.	"Rain & Shame"	4:16
6.	"Desert Ascetic"	4:35
7.	"Viento de Levante"	7:16
8.	"Leptonic Matter"	4:34
9.	"A Tale of Sand"	4:54
10.	"Filtered Through Prejudice"	10:40
11.	"Past Is Past"	9:06

== Personnel ==
Adapted from the Tryptych liner notes.

Demdike Stare

- Sean Canty – producer
- Miles Whittaker – producer

Production and additional personnel

- Radu Prepeleac – design
- Andy Votel – cover art

== Release history ==
Region	Date	Label	Format	Catalog
United Kingdom	2011	Modern Love	CD, LP	LOVE067
