= Dave Tyack =

- Origin: Manchester, England
- Genres: Folk; Psychedelic folk Folktronica; Math Rock
- Years active: 1998–2002
- Labels: Twisted Nerve Records
- Website: Official site

Dave Tyack (4 March 1978 – c. 2002), who also recorded under the name Dakota Oak, was an English musician and a founding artist on the Twisted Nerve Records label. He recorded alongside fellow Twisted Nerve artists Badly Drawn Boy and Andy Votel on several releases and played drums with two further bands, Misty Dixon and D.O.T. Tyack was also an artist and his own drawings featured on the covers of most of his records.

== Early life and education ==
Tyack was born in Hannover, Germany. He lived until the age of eight in a small village called Bredenbeck on the edge of the Deister wood. His debut full-length album Am Deister was named after this rural location and many of its tracks were inspired by his childhood adventures. The family moved to Ashbourne, Derbyshire and while at sixth form at Queen Elizabeth's Grammar School that he formed a short-lived band with his friends James Rutledge and Jimmy Wright. He then studied maths at the University of Manchester. After completing his degree in June 1999, Tyack began teacher training but soon realised it was not the right career for him.

== Early music ==
Having no luck in finding bandmates for a surf band, he started recording alone on a four-track, mainly playing bass guitar. Having heard Badly Drawn Boy's "EP1" he started taking his tapes to Andy Votel who then worked at Fat City Records. After several months and numerous demo tapes, Votel decided to sign him to the fledgling Twisted Nerve Records, which had originally been set up in 1997 merely to release Badly Drawn Boy's recordings. His first release was on Twisted Nerve compilation All Oar Nothing and his recording moniker was Dakota Oak. The band Mum and Dad and the electronic artist Sirconical joined the label at the same time and the Twisted Nerve roster began putting on live shows and DJ sets to promote the artists. Tyack felt he needed a band to play his music live, so he formed Dakota Oak Trio with Jimmy Wright and James Rutledge, but as they developed a rockier sound of their own with all three band members writing music, this became a band in its own right and was renamed D.O.T. to separate it from Tyack's solo act. Tyack played drums with D.O.T. but he played all instruments on his solo releases. D.O.T. also signed to Twisted Nerve and their first release was a rocking instrumental single called "Say Your Prayers", released in 2000. Dakota Oak, his solo act, released Kaleidoscope, a 10" vinyl mini album in April 1999, which received positive reviews.

== Career ==
He meanwhile completed the year's teacher training and released another 10" vinyl mini album, Pastures of Plenty, in November 1999. The inspiration for the instrumentals on this record was a trip around the United States. He spent his free time during his year of teaching working on the 26-track Am Deister album, which was eventually released in the spring of 2001. Reviews were almost unanimously positive, with many commenting on its originality, innocence and Bavarian quality. This was his first album release on CD and this, coupled with a less limited release, allowed his music to be brought to a larger audience. This album was the only release by "Dave Tyack's Dakota Oak" as Tyack wished to leave his old nom de plume behind and become known as David Tyack from this point (this is explained in its inlay card). The one single spawned by this album is "How Danny's friends became a force for good", the title taken from a chapter title in the John Steinbeck novel Tortilla Flat; the single also featured a cover of Neil Young's "Helpless". Meanwhile Tyack had gone from teaching to working in the call centre at Smile, the internet bank, which was a happier time for him, but a publishing deal allowed him to give up his job and concentrate on his music. He began collaborating more, with Badly Drawn Boy on "Wrecking the Stage" and Mum and Dad on "Black Sabbath" in 2000, and then joining Misty Dixon, another Twisted Nerve act, initially to aid with four-track recording but eventually playing drums and piano and writing with Jane Weaver. Misty Dixon's first release was the Milk Money EP in February 2001 with Dave co-writing one of the four tracks "Headlights (and when we drive)"; this release also garnered some acclaim.

Twisted Nerve celebrated its thirtieth release in the autumn of 2001 with a compilation Everything you always wanted to know about Twisted Nerve but were afraid to ask featuring tracks from previous releases of all of its artists. The accompanying tour spanned the UK and Tyack played at every date, because he performed with so many of the acts. Tyack played his own material with a new ensemble, featuring Naomi Hart on cello and Richard Tomlinson (who now records as Voice of the Seven Woods) playing guitar and cornet. The mini LP that followed, David Tyack with Richard Tomlinson and Naomi Hart contained some new compositions, new arrangements of tracks from Am Deister, a cover of Townes Van Zandt's "Colorado Girl" and the traditional song "Rock Island Line" (which, unusually, Tyack sang), all recorded as live in a studio. D.O.T. also released their first album Across Shawcroft in October 2001.

2002 saw Tyack collaborating, writing and recording for several releases. At the time of his disappearance he had completed recording on the first Misty Dixon album and the second D.O.T. album. He played on Jane Weaver's mini-album Like an aspen leaf, released in May 2002, and recorded new music for the Twisted Nerve compilation Zoo. He completed recording with Malcolm Mooney on Rip Van Winkle and also painted several paintings for the project, for exhibition and for the album's artwork. He was demo-ing new material with lyrics before he went on holiday.

== Disappearance and death ==
Tyack was found dead on the island of Corsica in June 2004, nearly two years after being declared missing, having apparently fallen to his death. An album titled Rip Van Winkle which featured his music was released posthumously. The album contained a reading of Rip Van Winkle, read by former Can front man Malcolm Mooney.

== Discography ==
=== Singles ===
TN021 – "How Danny's Friends Became A Force For Good" (as Dakota Oak)

=== Mini LPs ===
TN005 – Kaleidoscope (as Dakota Oak)
TN008 – Pastures of Plenty (as Dakota Oak)
TN031 – Dave Tyack With Richard Tomlinson & Naomi Hart

=== Albums ===
TN022 – Am Deister (as Dakota Oak) – was also a 4-track VHS
TN043 – Rip Van Winkle (With Malcolm Mooney)

=== Compilation appearances ===
TN003 – All Oar Nothing
TNXMS001 – Christmas Stocking Filler
TN009 – Modern Music For Motorcycles
TN015cd – Bends For 166 Miles<br /> TN030 – Everything You Always Wanted To Know About Twisted Nerve
TN040 – Twisted Nerve Zoo

=== Elsewhere ===
TN014 – "J'adore Le Batterie"
TNXL005 – Badly Drawn Boy – "Wrecking The Stage" (playing drums)
TN024 – Mum&Dad – "Black Sabbath" (playing drums)
