= Flock (Jane Weaver album) =

2021 album by Jane Weaver

Studio album by Jane Weaver
- Released: 5 March 2021
- Recorded: 2020
- Studios: Eve Studios (Bredbury, Stockport)
- Genre: Pop
- Length: 44:29
- Label: Fire
- Producers: Jane Weaver; Henry Broadhead; Andy Votel

Jane Weaver chronology
Fehérlófia (2019)	Flock (2021)	Love in Constant Spectacle (2024)

Singles from Flock
- 1. "The Revolution of Super Visions" Released: 13 October 2020; 2. "Heartlow" Released: 13 January 2021

Flock is the eleventh album by the English singer Jane Weaver, released on 5 March 2021 by Fire Records. Inspired by Lebanese torch songs, 1980s Russian Aerobics records and Australian punk, the album incorporates a pop-leaning production in comparison to Weaver's previous works. Upon release, the album was met with critical acclaim, with praise towards its experimental sound.

== Background and release ==
Flock follows Weaver's ambient ensemble Fenella's project Fehérlófia, delivered in 2019 that was inspired by Marcell Jankovics's 1981 Hungarian animated film of the same name. It also marks her first studio album release since, Loops in the Secret Society (2019). As opposed to her previous works which incorporated synth-pop, cosmic folk, experimental electronics, and avant-garde indie rock, Flock has a pop-indebted sound. According to Weaver, the record was inspired by Lebanese torch songs, 1980s Russian Aerobics records and Australian punk.

[...] Flock is a collection of pop songs that I don't think lend themselves to just one thing, I just went with the flow and looked at each song individually. The artwork features me in a peacock chair surrounded by birdboxes waiting for the flock to return.

— Weaver on the album, Louder Than War

The record was announced in October 2020, alongside the cover art and track listing. "The Revolution of Super Visions", a Prince-esque funk track, was simultaneously served as the lead single from the album. In lead-up to the release, the album opener, "Heartlow" was served as the second single on 13 January 2021. Flock was released on 5 March 2021 by Fire Records. The album was released in three vinyl editions: olive-green, cream, and standard light rose vinyl editions.

== Critical reception ==
Professional ratings
Aggregate scores
Source	Rating
AnyDecentMusic?	7.6/10
Metacritic	85/100
Review scores
Source	Rating
AllMusic	4/5 stars
The Arts Desk	4/5 stars
The Guardian	4/5 stars
The Line of Best Fit	8/10
Loud and Quiet	8/10
Mojo	4/5 stars
musicOMH	4/5 stars
The Quietus	4/5 stars
Under the Radar	8/10 stars
Uncut	9/10

At Metacritic, which assigns a weighted average rating out of 100 to reviews from mainstream publications, this release received an average score of 85, based on 10 reviews, indicating "universal acclaim". At AnyDecentMusic?, which collates album reviews from websites, magazines and newspapers, they gave the release an 8 out of 10, based on a critical consensus of 11 reviews.

In The Guardian, music critic Alexis Petridis listed it as the best album of its release week. He lauded the album for experimenting with diverse pop styles and incorporating a "hallucinatory" production. Petridis noted similarities in the music to the works of Kylie Minogue and Dua Lipa. He also praised the lyricism and described the record as "genuinely different and exhilarating". Janne Oinonen of The Line of Best Fit wrote that the album portrayed "the sweet revenge of the melody: dancefloor-friendly pop music, but of a variety that remains intoxicatingly unmoored to the conventions and codes of the earthly realm." Richard Foster of The Quietus felt the album recalled "'60s girl groups, '90s grooves, and '50s sound effects". He said that it acted as a "a midwife, delivering the feeling of delight you get when listening to things that have been sat glumly in the back of the cabinet, or reassessing careworn memories given a good polish."

Tim Sendra of AllMusic commended the album for exploring various genres and dubbed it as Weaver's "greatest-hits" album. He further wrote, "Flock is the work of a daring artist, a crafty writer and performer, and someone who is always worth following to see what kind of great things she might do in the future. Similarly, Under the Radar's Dom Gourlay considered it "the best of all Weaver's diverse genre colliding worlds in one glorious sitting." Loud and Quiet writer Alex Francis praised the album for its retro stylings and wrote that "Flock is a record which is invested in the production of a better future.

== Track listing ==
All tracks are written by Weaver

Side one
No.	Title	Length
1.	"Heartlow"	4:12
2.	"The Revolution of Super Visions"	5:01
3.	"Stages of Phases"	5:01
4.	"Lux"	1:29
5.	"Modern Reputation"	5:59

Side two
No.	Title	Length
6.	"Flock"	3:25
7.	"Sunset Dreams"	4:28
8.	"All the Things You Do"	4:25
9.	"Pyramid Schemes"	5:08
10.	"Solarised"	5:21
Total length:		42:29

== Charts ==
Chart performance for Flock
Chart (2021)	Peak position
Scottish Albums (Official Charts)	7
UK Albums (Official Charts)	24
