= Voices of Dust =

Studio album by Demdike Stare
- Released: November 29, 2010
- Genre: Dark ambient, ambient dub
- Length: 48:20
- Label: Modern Love
- Producer: Sean Canty, Miles Whittaker

Demdike Stare chronology
Liberation Through Hearing (2010)	Voices of Dust (2010)	Tryptych (2011)

Professional ratings
Review scores
Source	Rating
AllMusic	4.5/5 stars

Voices of Dust is the second studio album by Demdike Stare, released on November 29, 2010, by Modern Love Records.

== Track listing ==
All music is composed by Sean Canty and Miles Whittaker.

Side one
No.	Title	Length
1.	"Black Sun"	2:28
2.	"Hashshashin Chant"	6:20
3.	"Repository of Light"	11:21
4.	"Of Decay & Shadows"	2:37

Side two
No.	Title	Length
1.	"Rain & Shame"	4:16
2.	"Desert Ascetic"	4:35
3.	"Viento de Levante"	7:16
4.	"Leptonic Matter"	4:34
5.	"A Tale of Sand"	4:54

== Personnel ==
Adapted from the Voices of Dust liner notes.

Demdike Stare

- Sean Canty – producer
- Miles Whittaker – producer

Production and additional personnel

- Andreas Lubich – mastering
- Radu Prepeleac – design
- Andy Votel – cover art

== Release history ==
Region	Date	Label	Format	Catalog
United Kingdom	2010	Modern Love	LP	LOVE066
