= Silver Globe =

Silver Globe may refer to:

- On the Silver Globe (novel), first volume of the Polish science fiction epic Lunar Trilogy by Jerzy Żuławski
- On the Silver Globe (film), Polish film based on the novel, directed in 1988 by Andrzej Żuławski
- The Silver Globe, 2014 album by Jane Weaver
