= Symbiosis (Demdike Stare album) =

Compilation album by Demdike Stare
- Released: October 13, 2009
- Recorded: 2009
- Genre: Dark ambient
- Length: 54:39
- Label: Modern Love
- Producer: Sean Canty, Miles Whittaker

Demdike Stare chronology
Symbiosis (2009)	Forest of Evil (2010)

Professional ratings
Review scores
Source	Rating
Allmusic	3.5/5 stars

Symbiosis is a compilation album by Demdike Stare, released on October 13, 2009 by Modern Love Records. It comprises the duo's two self-titled EPs, which had been exclusive to the vinyl format.

== Track listing ==
All music is composed by Sean Canty and Miles Whittaker

No.	Title	Length
1.	"Suspicious Drone"	6:34
2.	"Haxan Dub"	5:13
3.	"Regressor"	5:04
4.	"All Hallows Eve"	3:53
5.	"Jannisary"	6:09
6.	"Haxan"	6:18
7.	"Extwistle Hall"	3:24
8.	"Trapped Dervish"	1:11
9.	"Nothing But the Night"	6:10
10.	"Conjoined"	4:07
11.	"Ghostly Hardware"	6:36

== Personnel ==
Adapted from the Symbiosis liner notes.

Demdike Stare

- Sean Canty – producer
- Miles Whittaker – producer

Production and additional personnel

- Danny Norbury – dulcimer, musical saw
- Andy Votel – cover art

== Release history ==
Region	Date	Label	Format	Catalog
United Kingdom	2009	Modern Love	CD	LOVE059
