= Elemental Part Four: Iris =

EP by Demdike Stare
- Released: January 2012
- Genre: Dark ambient
- Length: 19:15
- Label: Modern Love
- Producer: Sean Canty, Miles Whittaker

Demdike Stare chronology
Rose (2012)	Elemental Part Four: Iris (2012)	Elemental (2012)

Elemental Part Four: Iris is an EP by Demdike Stare, released in January 2012 by Modern Love Records.

== Track listing ==
All music is composed by Sean Canty and Miles Whittaker.

Side one
No.	Title	Length
1.	"Dauerlinie"	5:34
2.	"Dasein"	6:20

Side two
No.	Title	Length
1.	"Ishmael's Intent"	7:21

== Personnel ==
Adapted from the Elemental Part Four: Iris liner notes.

Demdike Stare

- Sean Canty – producer
- Miles Whittaker – producer

Production and additional personnel

- Andreas Lubich – mastering
- Radu Prepeleac – design
- Andy Votel – cover art

== Release history ==
Region	Date	Label	Format	Catalog
United Kingdom	2012	Modern Love	LP	LOVE076
