= Susan Christie =

American singer-songwriter

Susan Christie is an American singer from Philadelphia, Pennsylvania. She is best known for her hit folk song “I Love Onions” (1966) and for her critically acclaimed solo psychedelic-folk album Paint A Lady (2006). Her song "Rainy Day" from Paint A Lady is featured in the film Everything Everywhere All at Once (2022).

== Early career ==
Susan Christie studied at Berklee College of Music in Boston, Massachusetts along with future music producer and director John Hill, who she had met in junior high school when they were involved in a play. Most of her future music was produced in collaboration with Hill, with whom she was also romantically involved. While at Berklee, they came to the attention of Cameo-Parkway record producer Dave Appell, which inspired both Christie and Hill to begin seriously pursuing music as a career. Their first collaboration was a folk group called The Highlanders, who performed live at various folk festivals during the mid 1960s.

Although Susan Christie is not credited as a songwriter, several songs were written specifically with her in mind, most notably by John Hill, David Cochrane, and Bill Soden. In 1966, Christie and Hill recorded two folk-pop songs, “When Love Comes” and “No One Can Hear You Cry” which they unsuccessfully tried selling to various record labels. The songs were eventually released through the Chante label as a single but failed to chart, and were subsequently pushed aside in favor of new projects. Some forty years later they were included as the final two tracks on the album Paint A Lady, where they earned much critical praise.

== "I Love Onions" ==
Susan Christie's first taste of success came with the release of the novelty-folk song “I Love Onions” on April 11, 1966. The song, written by John Hill and David Cochrane, cost the couple $700 to produce and was picked up by Columbia Records. Described as having a catchy, quirky sound reminiscent of the 1920s, Christie's breathy vocals are featured with a chorus of kazoo, harmonica, and backup singers. The last verse is recited in an Elmer Fudd type of voice.

The song was well received, but only peaked at #63 on the Billboard Hot 100 chart. Released internationally, “I Love Onions” charted highest in Canada, where it came in at #19 on the RPM 100 national singles on August 1, 1966, and #5 on the CHUM Chart. It was featured in episodes of Captain Kangaroo, and later adapted for several television ads, including the debut of Funyuns in 1969 and a 1980 Turtles Chocolate commercial. The original single of “I Love Onions” features a second Hill - Cochrane song, “Take Me As You Find Me” on the b-side.

== Paint A Lady ==
Following the success of “I Love Onions”, Susan Christie and John Hill attempted to market two more pop-novelty singles through Columbia Records: “Tonight You Belong To Me” with b-side “Toy Balloon” released April 24, 1967 and “All I Have To Do Is Dream” paired with b-side “Anywhere You Are”, released October 17, 1967. Unfortunately, neither single made the charts, and Christie was also growing tired of the breathy pop style with which she was becoming associated. Bootlegs and vinyl rips of these songs circulated on the Internet for years before they finally received a rerelease as part of the Columbia Singles album on March 16, 2018.

Their success started to turn around however, when the pair were offered an album deal through ABC-Paramount. “This wonderful opportunity came for us to do things the way we would like to do them,” Christie would later say. They carefully selected a mixture of country, folk, and psychedelic songs and created unique, original renditions of each for an album to be released under the title Paint a Lady. But after the first few tracks were completed, ABC-Paramount pulled the deal, declaring the album to be un-commercial. Only three privately-pressed vanity copies were produced (circa 1970 - 1971) which the disappointed couple saved along with the master tapes.

Following the failure to complete Paint A Lady, Christie abandoned her dreams of recording as an independent artist, working instead as a jingle singer and focusing on personal and family life. “I had decided against being a normal singer because jingle work was easier to fit around the children. I sang about bladder control, detergents, Diet Pepsi and Maxwell House coffee,” she said during a 2008 interview.

Paint A Lady languished in all but forgotten obscurity in Christie's basement until, in the early 2000s, she was approached by a record company executive named Keith D’Arcy who specialized in rare and unusual recordings. She gave him one of the three copies, which he then shared with English DJ Andy Votel, owner and founder of Finders Keepers Records.

The album was released commercially for the first time in 2006 to great acclaim. The title track “Paint A Lady” was also released as a single for the Finders Keepers Records Compacta Series, including “Ghost Riders In The Sky” (which Susan Christie considered her finest recorded track) as a b-side. Finders Keepers Records described the album as a “psychedelic take on country standards and hand crafted tales of inner-city solitude backed by a break heavy folk funk rhythm section”. Spin Magazine described it as filled with “brilliantly original songs" and Christie's voice as a "dark, strange songbird”. Christie herself summed the album up simply: “I’d always been proud of it - it was a new sound, sort of ‘funky-folk’.”

== Later success ==
Following the warm reception to Paint A Lady, Andy Votel and his wife, recording artist Jane Weaver, organized a live concert dubbed The Lost Ladies Of Folk which headlined Susan Christie along with artists Bonnie Dobson and Wendy Flower. Lost Ladies Of Folk took place on Saturday, June 23rd, 2007 at the Queen Elizabeth Hall in London, England. Christie’s son appeared on stage with her, providing backup instrumentals. The concert represents Susan Christie’s only live performance as a solo artist.

She has since been included in several compilation albums, including Bearded Ladies available through Finders Keepers Records. In 2009, Christie was featured as a guest artist on John Hill’s album The Six Moons Of Jupiter, providing spoken word vocals, and in 2010 she appeared on Jane Weaver’s album The Fallen By Watch Bird.

Original copies of her singles are highly coveted by collectors, while CD and LP copies of Paint A Lady have become increasingly sought after on Internet auction and music sites since it was first released in 2006.

Finders Keepers Records released a remastered edition of Paint A Lady in February 2019.

Her song "Rainy Day" from Paint a Lady is featured in the Jobu Tupaki entrance scene of the film Everything Everywhere All at Once.

== Discography ==
=== Singles ===
- "When Love Comes" / "No One Can Hear You Cry" (Chante, 1966)
- "I Love Onions" / "Take Me As You Find Me" (Columbia, 1966)
- "Tonight You Belong to Me" / "Toy Balloon" (Columbia, 1967)
- "All I Have To Do Is Dream" / "Anywhere You Are" (Columbia, 1967)
- "Paint A Lady" / "Ghost Riders In The Sky" (Finders Keepers Records, 2006)

=== Albums ===
- Paint A Lady (Finders Keepers Records, 2006)
- Columbia Singles (Columbia - Legacy, 2018)

Guest Appearances

- The Six Moons Of Jupiter by John Hill (Finders Keepers Records, 2009)
- The Fallen By Watchbird by Jane Weaver (Finders Keepers Records, 2010)
