= Twisted Nerve Records =

- Founder: Damon Gough (Badly Drawn Boy), Andy Votel
- Country of origin: England
- Official website: www.twistednerve.co.uk

Twisted Nerve Records was a Manchester, England-based record label, founded by Damon Gough (AKA Badly Drawn Boy) and Andy Votel.

Best known for being the home of Badly Drawn Boy and Alfie, the label was active between 1997 and 2012.

== Artists ==
Artists who have signed to Twisted Nerve Records include:

- Aidan Smith
- Alfie
- Badly Drawn Boy
- Cherrystones
- Dakota Oak
- Dave Tyack
- DOT
- Jukes
- Little Miss Trinitron
- Luma Lane
- Misty Dixon
- Mum And Dad
- Rebelski
- Sirconical
- Sam and the plants
- Supreme Vagabond Craftsman
- Toolshed
- Andy Votel
- Voice of the Seven Woods
- Twinkranes

== See also ==
- Lists of record labels
