= Water-level task =

Psychology experiment

Example of the water-level task. In 1, a bottle of water sits upright on a table, with the water level marked in blue. In 2, the bottle has been tilted on its side (in this case, by 45 degrees). The respondent must mark the new water level.

Two example responses. Response A is correct: the water level has been drawn parallel to the horizontal. B is incorrect: the water level has been marked parallel to the bottom of the bottle.

The water-level task is an experiment in developmental and cognitive psychology developed by Jean Piaget and Bärbel Inhelder. The experiment attempts to assess the subject's spatial reasoning. The subject is shown an upright bottle or glass with a water level marked, then shown pictures of the container tilted at different angles without the level marked and asked to mark where the water level would be.

Piaget and Inhelder developed the test as part of their work on child development. It was first described in their book The Child's Conception of Space, published in French in 1948, with an English translation appearing in 1956. They described a series of stages children pass through in their understanding, corresponding to different modes of performance on the water-level test, before mastering it around the age of nine.

In 1964, Freda Rebelsky reported the surprising result that a significant number of her undergraduate and graduate students failed the task, and that the rate of failure was higher among female students. These results have since been replicated in a number of studies, and most subsequent interest in the water-level task has been concerned not with the study of child development but rather with accounting for the adults and adolescents that fail the test, and the apparent difference in success rates between the sexes.

== Sex differences in performance ==
It is difficult to give the precise fraction of men and women that fail the water-level task, since this is sensitive to the methodological details of how the task is presented and scored, but the finding that men perform at a higher level has been robustly confirmed. One typical study from 1989 found that 32% of college women failed the test, compared to 15% of college men. A 1995 experiment found that 50% of undergraduate males and 25% of females performed "very well" on the task and 20% of males and 35% of females performed "poorly". Similar sex differences have been confirmed internationally. The difference in performance between men and women has been estimated, in terms of Cohen's d, to be between 0.44–0.66 (i.e. between 0.44 and 0.66 standard deviations).
