= Elemental Part Three: Rose =

EP by Demdike Stare
- Released: January 2012
- Genre: Dark ambient
- Length: 23:28
- Label: Modern Love
- Producer: Sean Canty, Miles Whittaker

Demdike Stare chronology
| Chrysanthe & Violetta (2011) | Elemental Part Three: Rose (2012) | Iris (2012) |

Elemental Part Three: Rose is an EP by Demdike Stare, released in January 2012 by Modern Love Records.

== Track listing ==
All music is composed by Sean Canty and Miles Whittaker

Side one
| No. | Title | Length |
|---|---|---|
| 1. | "Erosion of Mediocrity" | 7:03 |
| 2. | "Nuance" | 7:40 |

Side two
| No. | Title | Length |
|---|---|---|
| 1. | "Falling Off the Edge" | 8:45 |

== Personnel ==
Adapted from the Elemental Part Three: Rose liner notes.

Demdike Stare

- Sean Canty – producer
- Miles Whittaker – producer

Production and additional personnel

- Radu Prepeleac – design
- Andy Votel – cover art

== Release history ==
| Region | Date | Label | Format | Catalog |
|---|---|---|---|---|
| United Kingdom | 2012 | Modern Love | LP | LOVE075 |
