= Forest of Evil =

EP by Demdike Stare
- Released: April 26, 2010
- Genre: Ambient dub, electronic
- Length: 24:49
- Label: Modern Love
- Producer: Sean Canty, Miles Whittaker

Demdike Stare chronology
Symbiosis (2009)	Forest of Evil (2010)	Liberation Through Hearing (2010)

Professional ratings
Review scores
Source	Rating
Allmusic	4/5 stars

Forest of Evil is an EP by English electronic music duo Demdike Stare, released on April 26, 2010 by Modern Love Records.

== Track listing ==
All music is composed by Sean Canty and Miles Whittaker

Side one
No.	Title	Length
1.	"Forest of Evil" (Dusk)	14:30

Side two
No.	Title	Length
1.	"Forest of Evil" (Dawn)	10:19

== Personnel ==
Adapted from the Forest of Evil liner notes.

Demdike Stare

- Sean Canty – producer
- Miles Whittaker – producer

Production and additional personnel

- Andreas Lubich – mastering
- Radu Prepeleac – design
- Andy Votel – cover art

== Release history ==
Region	Date	Label	Format	Catalog
United Kingdom	2010	Modern Love	LP	LOVE060
