= Funyuns =

Onion-flavored corn snack

FUNYUNS
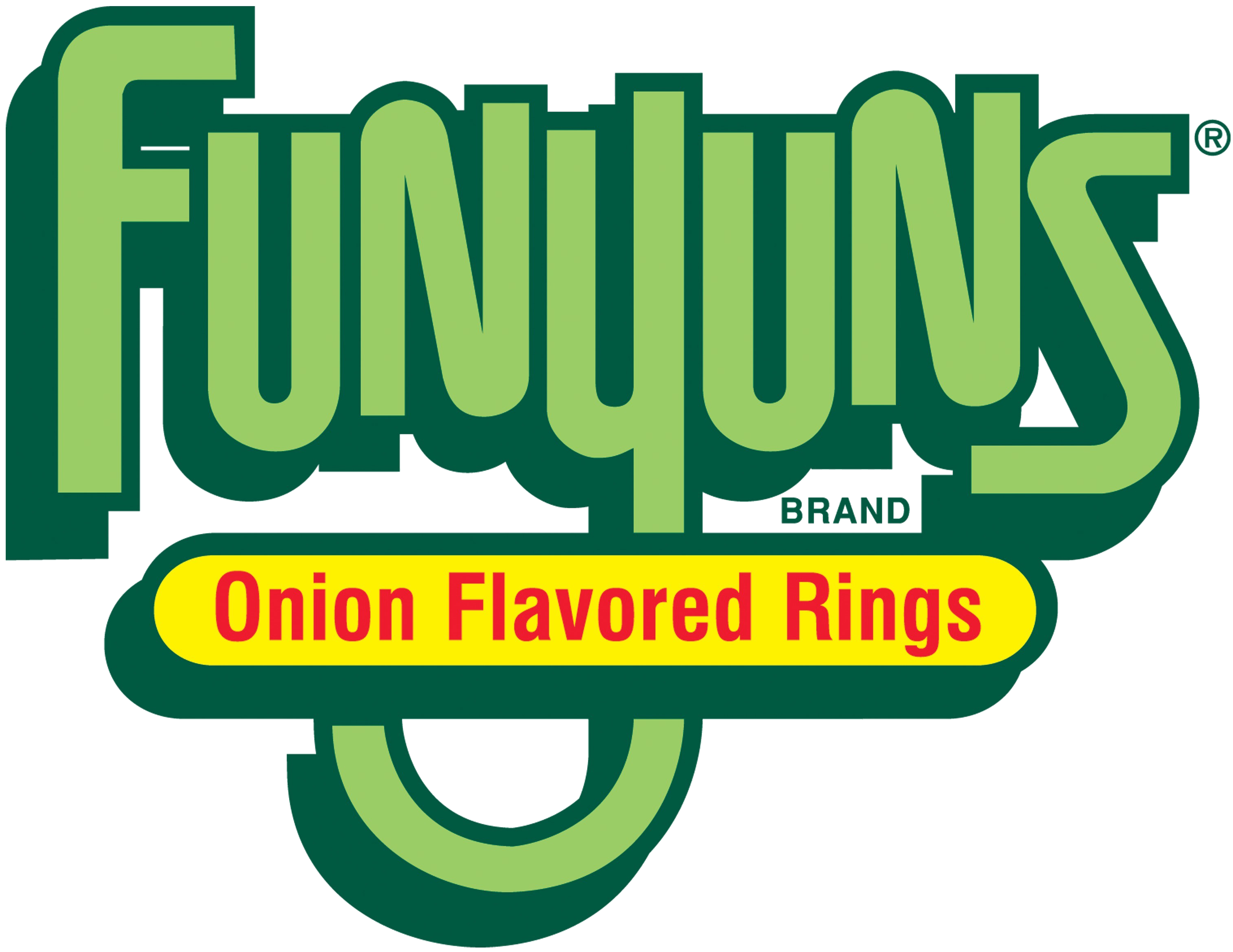

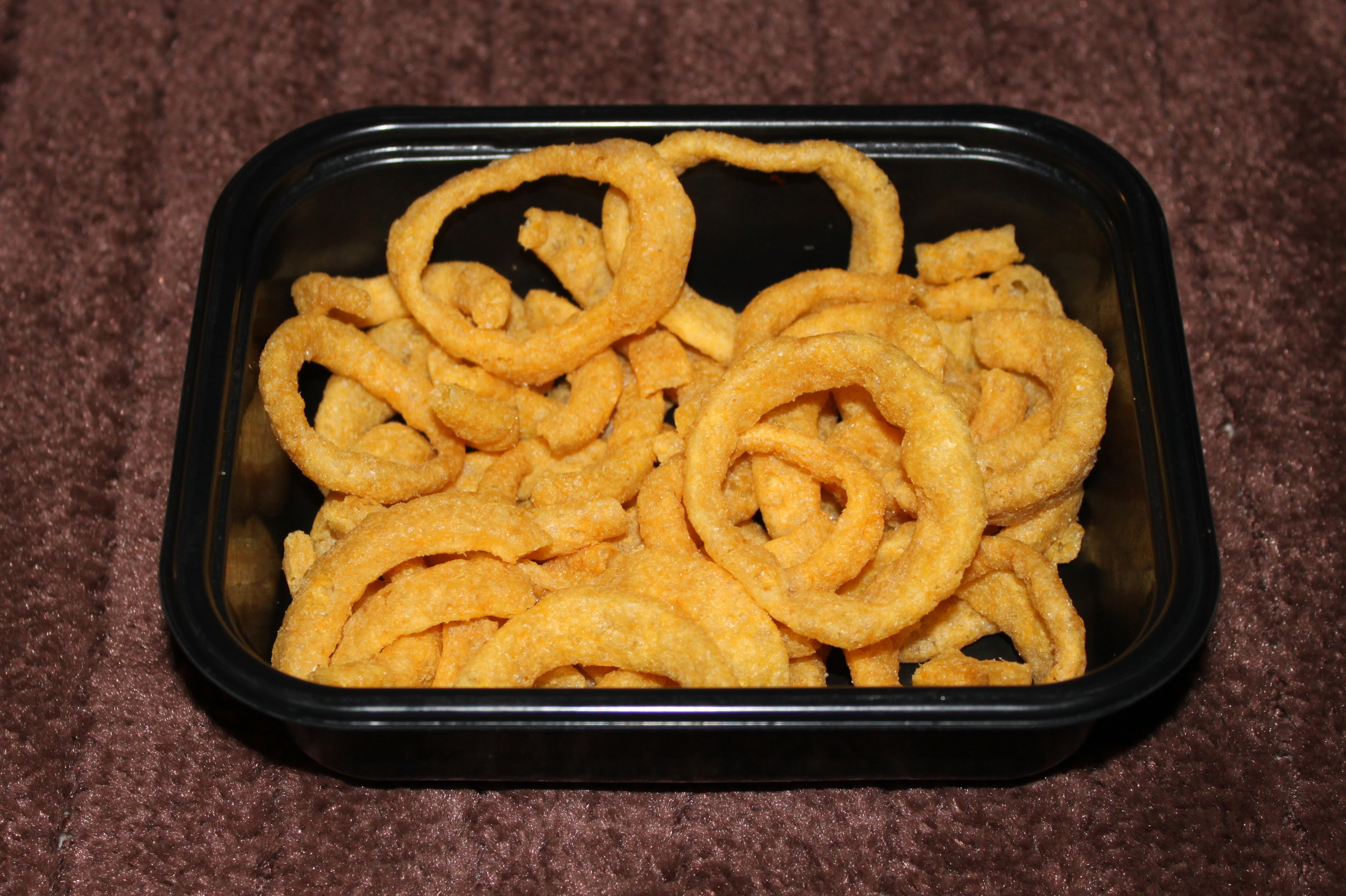
- Product type: Onion-flavored corn snack
- Current owner: Frito-Lay
- Country: United States
- Introduced: 1969; 57 years ago
- Website: funyuns.com

Funyuns is a brand of onion-flavored corn extruded snack introduced in the United States in 1969, and invented by Frito-Lay employee George Wade Bigner. Funyuns consist primarily of cornmeal, ring-shaped using an extrusion process, representing the shape of fried onion rings. A salt and onion mix gives them their flavor. They are a product of PepsiCo's Frito-Lay company. In Brazil, Funyuns are sold under the name "Cebolitos".

== History ==
They were named "Funyuns" by University of North Texas professor and copywriter Jim Albright after it was discovered that the first choice of name for the product, "OnYums," was a registered trademark of Rudolph Foods. Initial television advertising for the snack featured a variation of Susan Christie's 1966 song, "I Love Onions."

Over the years, several recipes have come out that use Funyuns as an ingredient, including one using the product as a replacement for fried onions in green bean casserole and using the crushed snack food as a Thanksgiving turkey coating.

== Flavors ==
- Original Funyuns (1969–present)
- Wasabi (2001–2002)
- Flamin' Hot (2007–present)
- Chilli & Limón (2014–2018)
- Steakhouse Onion (2015–2018; 2024–present, limited time)
- Spicy Queso (2023–2026)
- Maruchan Hot & Spicy Chicken Ramen (2024, 2025, limited time)
- Sour Cream & Funyuns (2025, limited time)

== See also ==
- List of brand name snack foods
