= Liberation Through Hearing (album) =

Studio album by Demdike Stare
- Released: July 26, 2010
- Genre: Dark ambient, ambient dub
- Length: 44:50
- Label: Modern Love
- Producer: Sean Canty, Miles Whittaker

Demdike Stare chronology
Forest of Evil (2010)	Liberation Through Hearing (2010)	Voices of Dust (2010)

Professional ratings
Review scores
Source	Rating
Allmusic	4.5/5 stars

Liberation Through Hearing is the debut studio album of Demdike Stare, released on July 26, 2010 by Modern Love Records.

== Track listing ==
All music is composed by Sean Canty and Miles Whittaker

Side one
No.	Title	Length
1.	"Caged in Stammheim"	5:18
2.	"Eurydice"	8:08
3.	"Regolith"	6:00

Side two
No.	Title	Length
1.	"The Stars Are Moving"	8:36
2.	"Bardo Thodol"	5:35
3.	"Matilda's Dream"	11:13

== Personnel ==
Adapted from the Liberation Through Hearing liner notes.

Demdike Stare

- Sean Canty – producer
- Miles Whittaker – producer

Production and additional personnel

- Andreas Lubich – mastering
- Radu Prepeleac – design
- Andy Votel – cover art

== Release history ==
Region	Date	Label	Format	Catalog
United Kingdom	2010	Modern Love	LP	LOVE065
