= Rebelsky =

Rebelsky or Rebelski is a surname. Notable people with the surname include:

- Freda Rebelsky (1931–2009), American psychologist, a researcher and an educator
- Iosif Rebelsky (1894–1949), Russian psychiatrist, psychologist, educator, professor
- Martin Rebelski (born 1974), British musician
