= Elemental Parts One & Two: Chrysanthe & Violetta =

EP by Demdike Stare
- Released: December 7, 2011
- Genre: Dark ambient, ambient dub
- Length: 38:31
- Label: Modern Love
- Producer: Sean Canty, Miles Whittaker

Demdike Stare chronology
Tryptych (2011)	Elemental Parts One & Two: Chrysanthe & Violetta (2011)	Rose (2012)

Professional ratings
Review scores
Source	Rating
Pitchfork Media	(7.9/10)

Elemental Parts One & Two: Chrysanthe & Violetta is an EP by Demdike Stare, released on December 7, 2011 by Modern Love Records.

== Track listing ==
All music is composed by Sean Canty and Miles Whittaker.

Side one
No.	Title	Length
1.	"Mephisto's Lament"	5:21

Side two
No.	Title	Length
1.	"Kommunion"	8:49
2.	"Unction"	5:17

Side three
No.	Title	Length
1.	"Mnemosyne"	5:31

Side four
No.	Title	Length
1.	"In the Wake of Chronos"	6:05
2.	"Violetta"	6:36

== Personnel ==
Adapted from the Elemental Parts One & Two: Chrysanthe & Violetta liner notes.

Demdike Stare

- Sean Canty – producer
- Miles Whittaker – producer

Production and additional personnel

- Andreas Lubich – mastering
- Radu Prepeleac – design
- Andy Votel – cover art

== Release history ==
Region	Date	Label	Format	Catalog
United Kingdom	2011	Modern Love	LP	LOVE073/LOVE074
