= Love in Constant Spectacle =

Studio album by Jane Weaver
- Released: 5 April 2024
- Length: 41:21
- Label: Fire
- Producers: John Parish; Jane Weaver

Jane Weaver chronology
Flock (2021)	Love in Constant Spectacle (2024)

Love in Constant Spectacle is the twelfth solo studio album by the English singer Jane Weaver, released on 5 April 2024 through Fire Records. It received acclaim from critics.

== Critical reception ==
Professional ratings
Aggregate scores
Source	Rating
Metacritic	84/100
Review scores
Source	Rating
AllMusic	4/5 stars
Exclaim!	8/10
The Line of Best Fit	8/10
Mojo	4/5 stars
MusicOMH	4/5 stars
PopMatters	8/10
Uncut	4/5 stars

Love in Constant Spectacle received a score of 84 out of 100 on review aggregator Metacritic based on seven critics' reviews, indicating "universal acclaim". Mojo found that "Love in Constant Spectacle is watchful rather than showy, its songs not boxing up one simple mood at a time but sitting with their uncertainty. Nuance might be going out of fashion in the world outside, but in here, Weaver speaks it fluently". Uncut's Piers Martin called it "by some distance her most satisfying album" as it is "full of surprises and tantalisingly familiar" and presents a "head-spinning account of grief and solace".

Fred Thomas of AllMusic described it as Weaver's "most emotionally based set of songs to date", stating that "her most remarkable material drawing from Krautrock-styled repetition, Stereolab's blithe pop, Broadcast's eerily captivating melodic flare, and Goldfrapp-esque synth grooves" and finding these to be present throughout the album. Exclaim!'s Eric Hill remarked that the album's "focus is slightly more inward-facing, but Weaver still finds ways to create distance between intention and expression even when she herself is the topic".

Reviewing the album for PopMatters, Peter Thomas Webb wrote that it "retains many of the same textures, although the overall effect is a little gentler and more meditative than her previous album, Flock". Janne Oinonen of The Line of Best Fit summarised that "the songs often straddle propulsive organic grooves that coalesce perfectly with Weaver's dreamy melodies and weightless vocals". MusicOMH's John Murphy called Love in Constant Spectacle "beautifully intricate, thoughtful songs [that] sit amid a hypnotic, otherworldly vibe that never settles for playing safe".

=== Year-end lists ===
Select year-end rankings for Love in Constant Spectacle
Publication/critic	Accolade	Rank	Ref.
MOJO	The Best Albums Of 2024	9	
Rough Trade UK	Albums of the Year 2024	31	

== Track listing ==
All tracks are written and arranged by Jane Weaver.

Love in Constant Spectacle track listing
No.	Title	Length
1.	"Perfect Storm"	3:14
2.	"Emotional Components"	5:16
3.	"Love in Constant Spectacle"	4:17
4.	"Motif"	2:40
5.	"The Axis and the Seed"	4:29
6.	"Is Metal"	4:03
7.	"Happiness in Proximity"	3:47
8.	"Romantic Worlds"	3:52
9.	"Univers"	5:11
10.	"Family of the Sun"	4:32
Total length:		41:21

== Personnel ==
Musicians

- Jane Weaver – lead vocals (all tracks), synthesizer (tracks 1–3, 5–9), guitar (2, 6, 8, 9), keyboards (4, 7), handclaps (6), piano (8), drum machine (10)
- Joel Nicholson – guitar (all tracks), shakers, twelve-string guitar (track 2); synthesizer, handclaps (6)
- Andrew Cheetham – drums (tracks 1–3, 5–10), percussion (10)
- Matt Grayson – bass guitar (tracks 1, 2, 5–10)
- John Parish – tambourine (tracks 1, 2, 8), piano (5, 7), handclaps (6)
- James Trevascus – drum programming (track 10)

Technical

- Jane Weaver – production
- John Parish – production
- Jason Mitchell – mastering
- James Trevascus – engineering
- Joe Jones – engineering
- Oliver Baldwin – engineering

Visuals

- Andy Votel – artwork

== Charts ==
Chart performance for Love in Constant Spectacle
Chart (2024)	Peak position
Scottish Albums (Official Charts)	31
UK Album Downloads (Official Charts)	11
UK Independent Albums (Official Charts)	8
