= James Rutledge =

English musician, record producer and remixer

- Born: Ashbourne, Derbyshire, England
- Origin: London, England
- Occupations: Musician, record producer, remixer
- Years active: 1999–present
- Labels: 4AD, Domino, Melodic, Moshi Moshi, Mush, RCA, Warp

James Rutledge is an English, London-based musician, record producer and remixer. He is from Ashbourne, Derbyshire, England.

== Life ==
James Rutledge studied at Queen Elizabeth's Grammar School, Ashbourne alongside fellow musician Dave Tyack, before reading English Literature at St Anne's College, Oxford between 1996 and 1999.

== Career ==
Rutledge recorded initially under the name Pedro, with his first EP in 1999 launching Manchester's Melodic Records. The name Pedro was derived from the main protagonist in the Alex Cox film El Patrullero. He has also recorded as Vowels and played with Ashbourne's Strongest Man, Chapters and D.O.T. (the latter in collaboration with Dave Tyack). He has released work on the labels 4AD, Domino, Melodic, Moshi Moshi, Mush, RCA and Warp.

He has worked with, remixed or been remixed by Bloc Party, Bombay Bicycle Club, Bracken, Danger Mouse, Everything Everything, Fever Ray, Foals, Four Tet, Ellie Goulding, The Kills, MGMT, Telepathe, The Pastels, Post War Years, Prefuse 73 and Radiohead.

In 2008 he auctioned a four-hour remix of the Radiohead song Videotape recorded on VHS on eBay with the money going to the charity Missing People, in part in memory of Dave Tyack.

== Awards ==
He was the Remixer of the Year at the 2011 MPG Awards.

He was shortlisted for Breakthrough Producer and Remixer of the Year at the 2012 MPG Awards.

== Discography ==
=== Singles and EPs (as Pedro) ===
- Pedro EP (Melodic Records, 1999)
- Chapel Was My Dream (Melodic Records, 2001)

=== Remixes ===
- Japancakes - "Soon" (James Rutledge Mix)
- Bloc Party - "Uniform" (James Rutledge Remix)
- Fever Ray - "Triangle Walks" (James Rutledge Remix)
- Everything Everything - "MY KZ UR BF" (James Rutledge Remix)
- The Kills - "Last Day of Magic" (James Rutledge Remix)
- MGMT - "Electric Feel" (James Rutledge Remix)
- DNTEL - "To a Fault" (James Rutledge Remix)
