= Chelsea Light Moving =

American rock band

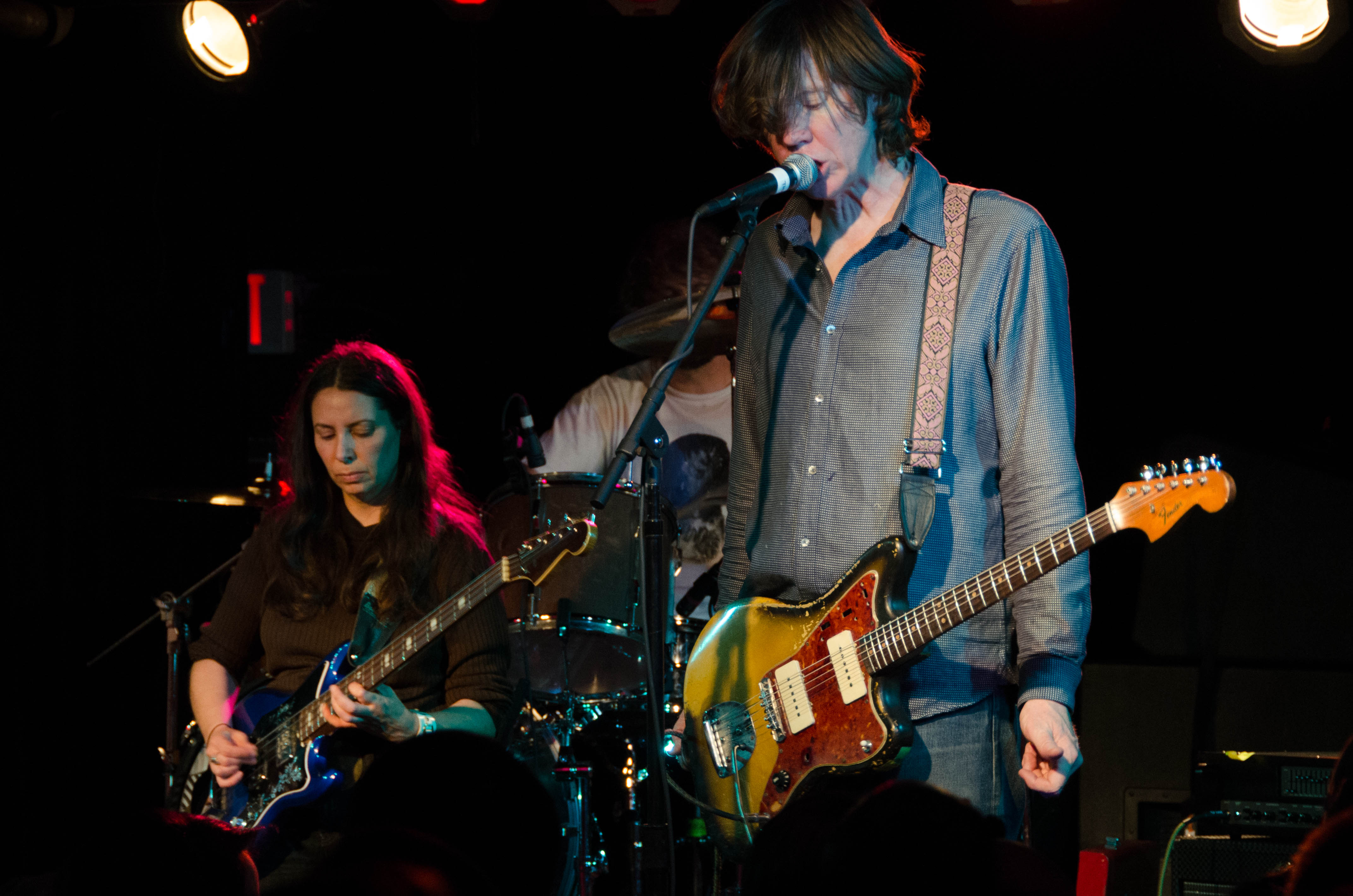
- Chelsea Light Moving in 2013

Background information
- Origin: New York City, U.S.
- Genres: Noise rock, punk rock, indie rock
- Years active: 2012–2015
- Label: Matador
- Past members: Samara Lubelski; John Moloney; Thurston Moore; Keith Wood
- Website: chelsealightmoving.com

Chelsea Light Moving was an American alternative rock band formed in 2012 in New York City. The band consisted of Samara Lubelski, John Moloney, Thurston Moore, and Keith Wood. The band's eponymous debut album was released in 2013 on Matador Records.

== History ==
The band's songs featured prominent references to avant garde artists, the 1960s counterculture movement, and New York City. Thurston Moore chose the band's name due to its association with a moving company started by composer Philip Glass:

I decided to call the band "Chelsea Light Moving" because I had been reading this book called Love Goes to Buildings on Fire by Will Hermes, which is a history of New York underground music from 1972 to around 1978. He talked about Philip Glass starting a moving company. [Glass] had a van and he took a classified ad out in a local paper and he called the moving company "Chelsea Light Moving". He started the moving company so he could make some coin to rent out a concert hall to put on a performance. As soon as I saw that, I really liked it.

Current countercultural movements are also addressed by Chelsea Light Moving, notably the Occupy Wall Street on the song "Lip":

Those lyrics do have a certain cynicism to them. I wrote them during the Occupy Wall Street protests, which I was completely supportive of and really into. I like the attempts at anarchy, and the idea of it being sort of a street-school of ideas. I thought it was contemporary and defining itself outside of the old guard of protests and resistance that had existed historically. The old guard of protests became mollified by the machine of power and money, it didn't really have much effect any more, so there needed to be a new way of bringing attention to any kind of injustice that goes on socially. I was really inspired and impressed by it. "Lip" was written about wanting to give power to anger in the face of injustice.

The band broke up in 2015, and Thurston Moore has since continued making music under his own name.

== Discography ==
Chelsea Light Moving discography
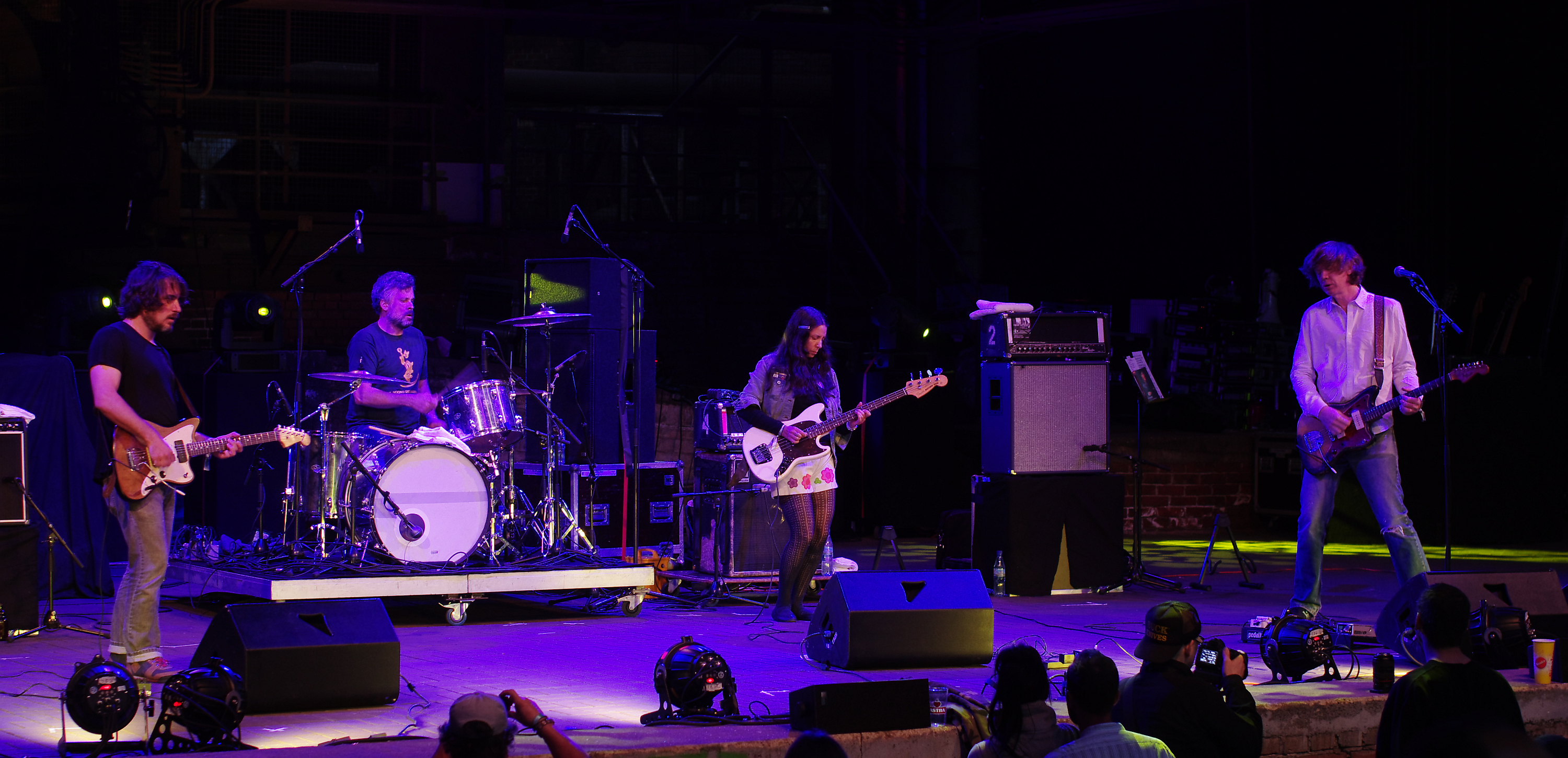
- Chelsea Light Moving performing in 2013
- Studio albums: 1
- Singles: 3
- Music videos: 2

The discography of Chelsea Light Moving, an American alternative rock band from New York formed in 2012, consists of one studio album, three singles and two music videos.

Chelsea Light Moving's membership includes Thurston Moore (vocals, guitar), Keith Wood (guitar), Samara Lubelski (bass) and John Moloney (drums). Formed following the announcement of the indefinite hiatus of Sonic Youth, Moore's former band, Chelsea Light Moving released three singles—"Burroughs", "Groovy & Linda" and "Frank O'Hara Hit"—in a series of blog posts on Matador Records' official site over summer 2012. In 2013, the band's eponymous debut album was released to critical acclaim and upon its release, charted in both of Belgium's Ultratop albums charts in Flanders and Wallonia. The album also debuted on the United States' Billboard Heatseekers Albums chart at number 12.

=== Studio albums ===
List of studio albums with selected chart positions
Title	Album details	Peak chart positions		
Title	Album details	US Heat	BEL (VL)	BEL (WA)
Chelsea Light Moving	Released: March 5, 2013 (US); Label: Matador (OLE 1010); Formats: CD, LP, DD	12	103	192

=== Singles ===
List of singles with associated album
Title	Year	Album
"Burroughs"	2012	Chelsea Light Moving
"Groovy & Linda"	2012	Chelsea Light Moving
"Frank O'Hara Hit"	2012	Chelsea Light Moving

=== Music videos ===
List of music videos with director(s)
Title	Year	Director	Ref.
"Lip"	2013	Eva Prinz	
"Heavenmetal"	2014	Julien Langendorff	
