= Chelsea Light Moving (album) =

Studio album by Chelsea Light Moving
- Released: March 5, 2013
- Recorded: 2012
- Studios: Sonelabel, Easthampton, Massachusetts
- Genres: Noise rock, punk rock, indie rock
- Length: 49:11
- Label: Matador
- Producer: Justin Pizzoferrato

Singles from Chelsea Light Moving
- 1. "Burroughs" Released: June 22, 2012; 2. "Groovy & Linda" Released: July 10, 2012; 3. "Frank O'Hara Hit" Released: July 25, 2012

Chelsea Light Moving is the only studio album by the American noise rock band Chelsea Light Moving, released on March 5, 2013, on Matador Records. Recorded across two short sessions in Easthampton, Massachusetts with producer Justin Pizzoferrato in mid-2012, the album features a form of alternative and experimental rock that the band dubbed "Burroughs rock" and includes references to writers, avant garde artists, the 1960s counterculture movement and New York.

Upon its release, Chelsea Light Moving and its three singles—"Burroughs", "Groovy & Linda" and "Frank O'Hara Hit"—received positive critical acclaim. The album charted in Belgium and the United States, peaking at number 12 on Billboard's Heatseekers Album Chart. In support of its release, the band embarked on an international tour.

== Recording ==
Chelsea Light Moving was recorded "across two quick fire sessions" at Sonelab in Easthampton, Massachusetts in the middle of 2012. The sessions were produced and engineered by Justin Pizzoferrato, who later mixed the album. According to vocalist and guitarist Thurston Moore, a number of additional songs, including a song titled "No Go", were considered for recording along with the album's ten tracks but "the hard part was choosing an album's worth of tracks" to record during a process he referred to as "short [and] efficient". The rehearsal sessions, according to Moore, "paid off in a polished sound with a strong sense of ensemble" and with the exception of a short number of guitar and vocal overdubs, the album was recorded live, as opposed to the conventional multitrack recording process. The album was recorded entirely on analog equipment.

== Composition ==
Chelsea Light Moving contains nine original songs written and composed by vocalist and guitarist Thurston Moore and a cover of the Germs'"Communist Eyes", written by Darby Crash and Pat Smear. The band has described the music on the album as "Burroughs rock", a reference to the Beat Generation writer William S. Burroughs, after whom one of the album's songs is named. The song, "Burroughs", is based on the writer's reported last words: "Love? What is it? Most natural painkiller what there is." According to Moore, Burroughs "was ruminating on the emotion of love. And for William S. Burroughs to talk about love is a fascinating thing to begin with, and those were his last words."

The album is laden with other references to avant garde artists, the 1960s counterculture movement and New York. The title of both the album and the band is a reference to the Chelsea Light Moving Company, a moving company run by cash-strapped composers Philip Glass and Steve Reich. Moore noted that "Frank O'Hara Hit" alludes to the death of the poet Frank O'Hara, who was killed after being struck by a dune buggy on July 24, 1966, on Fire Island, New York. Moore praised O'Hara as knowing "poetry in all it's [sic] formalist glory and like John Cage's ear to music liberated it for writers for an unending time." "Empires of Time" is a tribute to Roky Erickson, vocalist and guitarist of The 13th Floor Elevators. According to Moore, "if there's anything to be known about 'Empires of Time', know that it is a call of honor, and a kiss on the hallowed forehead, to Roky Erickson of Austin, Texas, a maestro of American psychedelic rock n roll of the highest order." "Groovy & Linda" refers to Linda Fitzpatrick and James "Groovy" Hutchinson, an East Village hippie couple who were murdered in the late 1960s, and who "were seen as a mortal wound to the carefree image of the hippie movement."

== Release ==
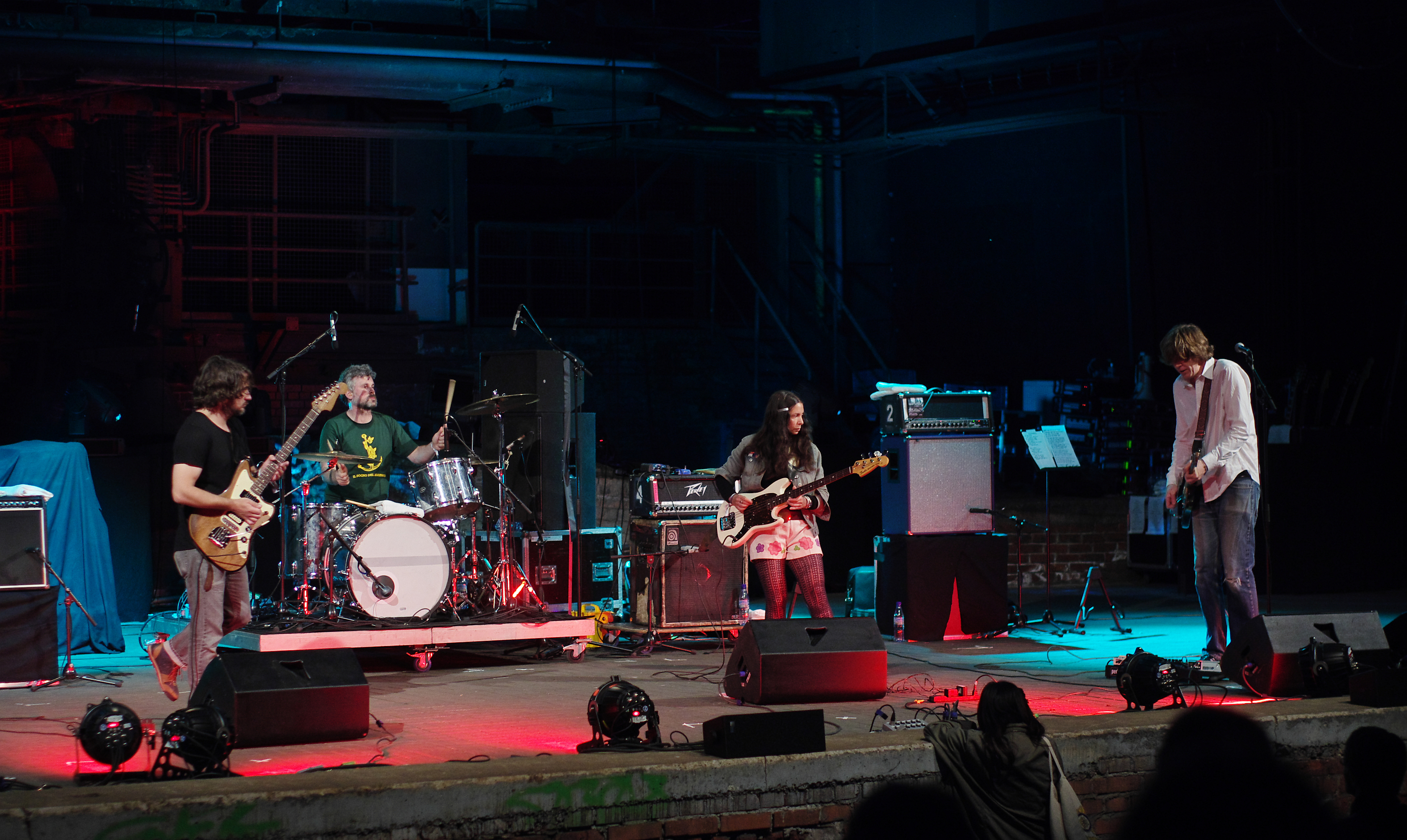
Chelsea Light Moving performing at the Traumzeit-Festival in Duisburg, Germany on June 23, 2013.

Chelsea Light Moving was released on March 5, 2013, on Matador Records. It was made available as on CD, LP and digital download. The LP pressing of the album omitted two tracks featured on both the CD and download versions of the album; "heavenmetal" and "Communist Eyes", which were included as a separate bonus 7" with retail copies of the album. Prior to its official release, NPR made Chelsea Light Moving available for online stream on February 25, 2013. Three singles were released from Chelsea Light Moving: "Burroughs", released on June 22, 2012, "Groovy & Linda", released on July 10, 2012, and "Frank O'Hara Hit", released on July 25, 2012. All of the album's singles were made available as free MP3 downloads from Matador Records official blog.

Chelsea Light Moving was a moderate commercial success. The album charted on both of Belgium's Ultratop album charts in Flanders and Wallonia, peaking at number 103 and 192 respectively. It debuted on the United States' Billboard Heatseekers Albums chart at number 12. In support of the album's release, Chelsea Light Moving began an international tour in March 2013. The band embarked on a twenty date tour of North America, beginning at Maxwell's in Hoboken, New Jersey on March 2 and concluding at The Sinclair in Cambridge, Massachusetts on April 7, with Talk Normal, Merchandise, Grass Widow and Cave supporting. The band toured Europe for the first time throughout June and July 2013, performing individual shows and making appearances at summer music festivals. The European leg of the band's tour began at Hulen in Bergen, Norway on June 7 and concluded at the Cactus Festival in Bruges, Belgium on July 12.

== Reception ==
Professional ratings
Aggregate scores
Source	Rating
Metacritic	77/100
Review scores
Source	Rating
Allmusic	3.5/5 stars
The A.V. Club	B
Consequence of Sound	4/5 stars
Drowned in Sound	8/10
Los Angeles Times	2.5/4 stars
NME	7/10
PopMatters	7/10
Pitchfork Media	6.8/10
Spin	8/10
Tiny Mix Tapes	3.5/5 stars

Upon its release, Chelsea Light Moving received positive critical acclaim. At Metacritic, which assigns a normalised rating out of 100 to reviews from mainstream critics, the album received an average score of 77, based on 31 reviews, indicating "generally favorable reviews". Allmusic's Fred Thomas rated the album three and a half out of five stars and praised many of its features, describing it as "fun, huge, and pleasantly confused [...] but ultimately just another chapter in Moore's lifelong exploration of sound, poetry, and the darkest corners of American subcultures he helped build." Ryan Bray of Consequence of Sound's review speculated upon the link between the album's sense of angst and Moore's then-recent separation from wife and Sonic Youth bandmate, Kim Gordon, stating "there's a volatile undercurrent to the songs [...] It's easy to suspect that Moore's personal ups and downs had a hand in shaping the album's terse temperament, and the record affirms the sleeping art school brat that's always burned inside him." Bray rated the album four out of five stars. In his seven out of ten Drowned in Sound review, J.R. Moores commented that Chelsea Light Moving "glances down at the polite, folkish path Moore had ploughed with Trees Outside the Academy and Demolished Thoughts, stamps on it with Dr. Marten boots, gobs on it, hurls a load of soil all over the place and then runs in the opposite direction back to 1995's Psychic Hearts."

Writing for the Los Angeles Times, August Brown criticized Chelsea Light Moving as the work of "high-minded musicians doing some dumb, brawny lifting [...] [a] low-stakes, punky project [that] sounds like it was written in an afternoon," although rated the album two and a half out of four stars. Pitchfork was similarly critical, with reviewer Aaron Leitko writing that "the record seems like a conscious attempt for Moore to get back to serious shredding, to move away from introspection and toward the immediate thrill of pummel and screech. Sometimes, Chelsea Light goes too far, stumbling past primal and towards boneheaded." However, NME reviewer Louis Pattison Kory praised the album's "slanted alt-rock chugs, spat-out beat poetry and songs about counterculture icons", rating it seven out of ten.

Spin's Kory Grow gave Chelsea Light Moving a positive review, rated the album eight out of ten, and said "regardless of the catalyst, Chelsea Light Moving is an entirely successful test of Moore's post-breakup mettle." PopMatters' Kevin Korber praised the album's high energy, referred to it as "an attempt to return to youth via the paring down of Moore's musical vocabulary" and adding "even the simpler songs on the album aren't so simple that they become sloppy and amateurish" in his seven out of ten review. Writing for Tiny Mix Tapes, Clifford Allen awarded Chelsea Light Moving three and a half out of five stars and noted that "the quartet seem to be looking through a number of related ways to assert themselves within the construct of a noisy rock band — all engaging and memorable, but none definitive."

== Track listing ==
All songs written and composed by Thurston Moore unless otherwise noted.

Standard CD track listing
No.	Title	Writer(s)	Length
1.	"Heavenmetal"		2:08
2.	"Sleeping Where I Fall"		5:49
3.	"Alighted"		7:49
4.	"Empires of Time"		5:12
5.	"Groovy & Linda"		4:36
6.	"Lip"		2:37
7.	"Burroughs"		6:10
8.	"Mohawk"		6:51
9.	"Frank O'Hara Hit"		5:32
10.	"Communist Eyes"	Darby Crash, Pat Smear	2:27
Total length:			49:11

Standard LP track listing
No.	Title	Length
1.	"Lip"	2:37
2.	"Sleeping Where I Fall"	5:49
3.	"Alighted"	7:49
4.	"Empires of Time"	5:12
5.	"Groovy & Linda"	4:36
6.	"Burroughs"	6:10
7.	"Mohawk"	6:51
8.	"Frank O'Hara Hit"	5:32
Total length:		44:36

LP edition bonus 7"
No.	Title	Writer(s)	Length
1.	"heavenmetal"		2:08
2.	"Communist Eyes"	Crash, Smear	2:27
Total length:			4:35

== Personnel ==
All personnel credits adapted from Chelsea Light Moving's liner notes.

Chelsea Light Moving

- Thurston Moore – vocals, guitar
- Keith Wood – guitar
- Samara Lubelski – bass
- John Moloney – drums

Technical personnel

- Justin Pizzoferrato – recording, mixing

Design personnel

- "☮" (Eva Prinz) – collage
- Phillip Laslett – layout
- James Hamilton – photography

== Chart positions ==
Chart (2013)	Peak position
Belgian Albums Chart (Flanders)	103
Belgian Albums Chart (Wallonia)	192
US Billboard Heatseekers Albums	12
