= Hush Arbors =

American musical project

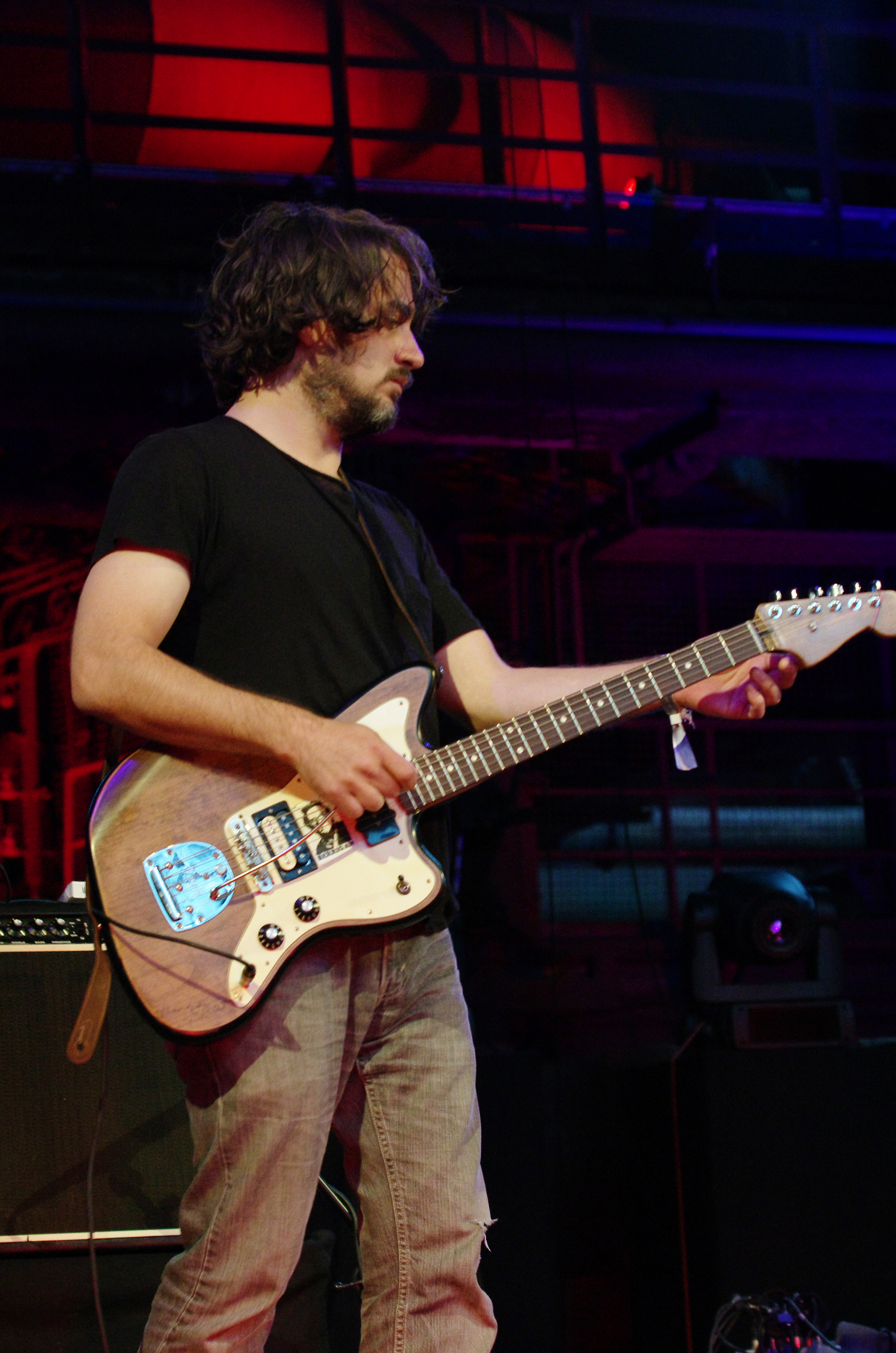
- Wood performing with Chelsea Light Moving in Landschaftspark Duisburg-Nord

Background information
- Born: Keith Wood; April 30, 1977 (age 49); Charlottesville, Virginia, U.S.
- Genres: New Weird America; Folk; Rock; Country
- Instruments: Vocals, guitar, bass
- Labels: Ecstatic Peace! Three Lobed; Blackest Rainbow; The Great Pop Supplement; Digitalis; Harvest Recordings
- Website: husharborsmusic.com

Hush Arbors is the primary musical project of American musician singer/songwriter/guitarist Keith Wood. His music uses traditional folk merged with elements of country and psychedelic music. Along with releasing solo material Wood was also a member of Chelsea Light Moving. He has toured with and worked with musicians including Current 93, Six Organs of Admittance, Sunburned Hand of the Man, Jack Rose, Wooden Wand and Voice of the Seven Woods.

Hush Arbors is currently signed to Thurston Moore's Massachusetts-based Ecstatic Peace! label.

== Discography ==
- If There Be Spirits Let Them Come [3"cdr](foxglove)
- Hush Arbors [cdr] (Digitalis)
- Since We Have Fallen [cdr] (Digitalis)
- Under Bent Limb Trees [cd] (Digitalis)
- Death Calligraphy [3"cdr] (mymwly)
- Cleaning The Bone [3"cdr] (267 lattajjaa)
- Since We Have Fallen [LP] Reissue (Harvest Recordings)
- Landscape of Bone [cd] (Three Lobed Recordings, 2006)
- "Live in Sheffield"[cdr] (Blackest Rainbow, 2007)
- Under Bent limb tree's [2Xcd expanded reissue](digitalis 2007)
- Hush Arbors [cd] (Ecstatic Peace!, 2008)
- Yankee Reality [cd] (Ecstatic Peace!, 2009)
- "Alive"[2XLP] (Blackest Rainbow, 2011)
- "Gualala Blues" [cassette] (Dismal Niche 2015)
- "Albion Way" [cassette] (WasIstDas, 2016)

=== Splits ===
- hush arbors/north sea/terracid [cdr] (Barl Fire)
- hush arbors/north sea [cdr] (foxglove)
- hush arbors/wooden wand/satya sai [cdr] (self released)
- hush arbors/voice of the seven woods[split 45] (great pop supplement)
- hush arbors/wooden wand-swappin[split 45] (great pop supplement)
- hush arbors/jerusalem and the starbaskets[split 45] (great pop supplement)
- hush arbors/arboretum Aureola [LP/CD] (Thrill Jockey)

=== Related ===
- family lsd – last of the red hot lovers [cdr] (foxglove)
- golden oaks – autumn testament[cdr] (Digitalis)
- golden oaks – paradise [cdr] (Barl Fire)
- golden oaks/botos split [cdr] (time-lag)
- Wooden Wand – horus of the horizon [cd] (Three Lobed Recordings)
- six organs of admittance – days of blood [cdr] (self released)
- sunburned hand of the man – when the shit hits the jazz [cdr] (manhand)
- zodiacs – come & gone [cdr] (23 productions)
- zodiacs – gone [cd] (holy mountain)
- Pantaleimon – Mercy Oceans [cd] (DURTRO/JNANA)
- Current 93 – Birth Canal Blues Live [cd & lp] (Coptic Cat)
- Current 93 – Aleph at Hallucinatory Mountain [cd & lp] (Coptic Cat)
- Current 93 – Monohallucinatory Mountain [cd & lp] (Coptic Cat)
- Current 93 – Aleph On Docetic Mountain[cd] (Coptic Cat)
- Chelsea Light Moving – S/T [cd/lp] (Matador Records)
