= Freda Rebelsky =

Freda Rebelsky (1931 – July 20, 2009) was an American psychologist, author, researcher and educator.

In 1964, she reported the surprising result that a significant number of her undergraduate and graduate students failed the water-level task, and that the rate of failure was higher among female students. These results have since been replicated in a number of studies, and most subsequent interest in the water-level task has been concerned not with the study of child development but rather with accounting for the adults and adolescents that fail the test, and the apparent difference in success rates between the sexes.

According to Boston University, she was the first woman to join their psychology department and the first woman to earn tenure in that department. In 1996, after serving as professor there for 34 years, she retired and became a motivational speaker advocating for social justice.

== Books ==
- 1960: (as co-editor, with Lynn Dorman) Child Development and Behavior
- 1975: Life the continuous process: Readings in human development

== Awards ==
She won the Metcalf Award for Excellence in Teaching, in 1978. She was the first female psychologist to win the E. Harris Harbison Award for Gifted Teachers from the Danforth Foundation and the 1970 Distinguished Contributions to Education in Psychology Award from the American Psychological Association.

== See also ==
- Water-level task
