= Rick Tomlinson =

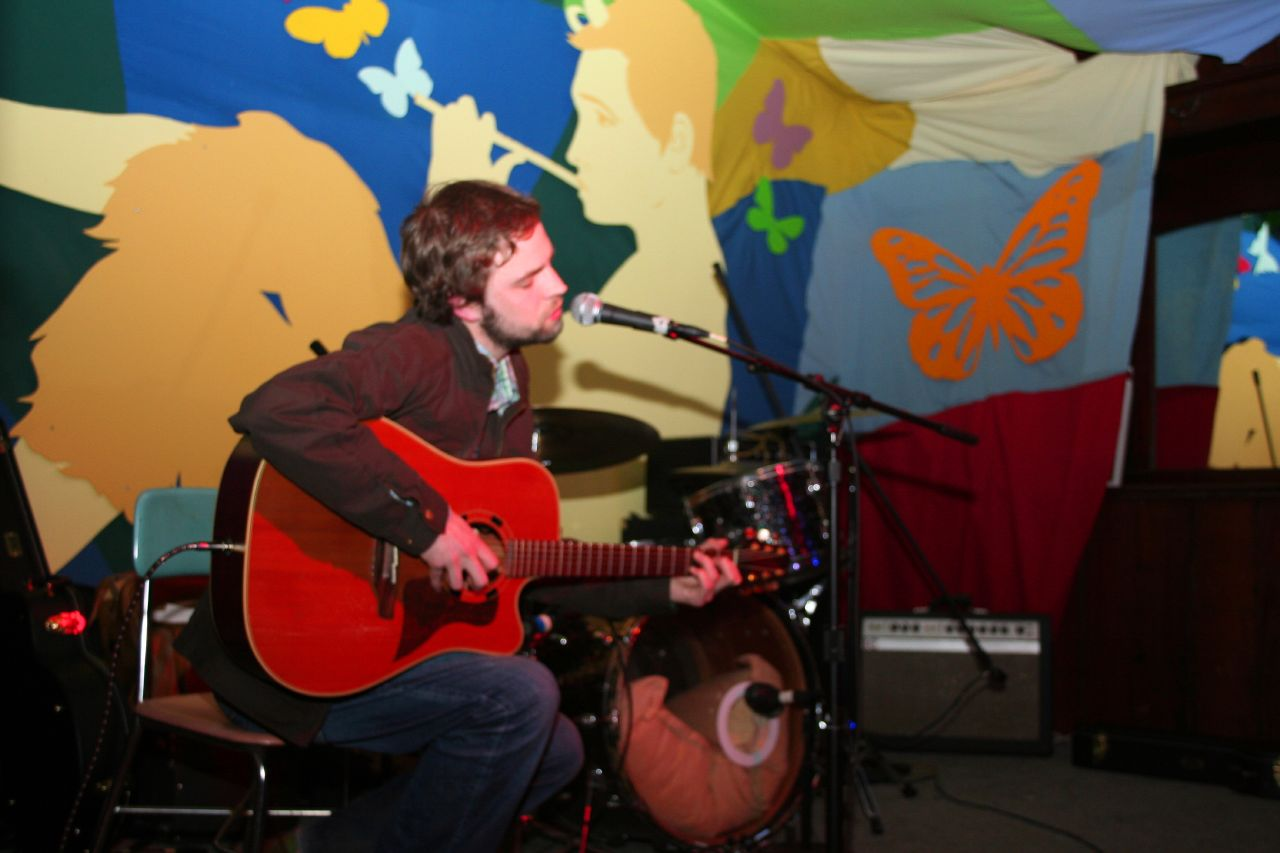
- Rick Tomlinson performing at Folkyeah Spring Festival in Big Sur, California, on 20 April 2007.

Background information
- Also known as: Voice of the Seven Woods, Voice of the Seven Thunders
- Origin: Bolton, England
- Genres: Experimental, Freak folk, Psychedelic rock
- Years active: 2003–present
- Labels: Twisted Nerve Records; Tchantinler Recordings; Voix Records; Frst Prsn; Great Pop Supplement; Blackest Rainbow; Sloow Tapes; Kning Disk
- Website: Official site

Rick Tomlinson is an English musician, best known for one of his projects, Voice of the Seven Woods. Tomlinson is most commonly associated with the Manchester alternative music scene, and is regularly associated with the B-Music collective; a Manchester-based DJ, music and arts collaboration that includes DJ Andy Votel, Super Furry Animals's frontman Gruff Rhys and various other DJs and artists.

== Biography ==
Rick Tomlinson began his association with Twisted Nerve Records, when he played guitar alongside Dave Tyack. on various releases.

Tomlinson's debut album was released on 6 August 2007 under the moniker Voice of the Seven Woods. Eponymously titled, it was released on both CD and gatefold vinyl. The US version, distributed by B-Music, contained two bonus tracks. It is one of his few unlimited releases to date.

He has played several notable festivals including Green Man Festival in 2005, 2006 and 2007, Supersonic Festival in Birmingham, again in 2006 and 2007, and the Moseley Folk Festival, Birmingham.

After a period of performing solo, the live band during the tour of the Voice of the Seven Woods album and the Voice of the Seven Thunders albums, consisted of a trio of Tomlinson, Chris Walmsley on drums and Pete Hedley on bass.

In 2010, under the moniker "Voice of the Seven Thunders" he released a new album with the same name.

In 2017, he released the album Phases of Daylight as Rick Tomlinson, initially as an exclusive LP, but later also as an online download on Bandcamp.

In 2018, under the moniker "En Dag" he released a new album with the same name, limited to 300 vinyl LPs. En Dag is the previously unreleased collaboration between Rick Tomlinson, Chris Walmsley and Pete Hedley. The album was recorded one day at Konst & Ramar studio in Stockholm, while touring the Voice of the Seven Woods album in January 2007.

In 2023, he released a collaborative album called Waves with American guitarist Ben Chasny of Six Organs of Admittance.

== Discography ==
=== Studio albums ===
- Voice of the Seven Woods – CD / LP (Twisted Nerve, 2007), as Voice of the Seven Woods
- Voice of the Seven Thunders – CD / LP (Tchantinler Recordings, 2010), as Voice of the Seven Thunders
- Phases of Daylight – LP / MP3 (Voix Records, 2017), as Rick Tomlinson
- En Dag – LP (Voix Records, 2018), as En Dag
- Waves – LP / MP3 (Voix Records, 2023), as Ben Chasny and Rick Tomlinson

=== EPs ===
- Voice of the Seven Woods – CDR EP (Self-released, 2006)
- The Withering of the Boughs – 3" CDR (First Person, 2006)
- Tchantinler EP – CDR (Tchantinler, 2006)
- Unitarian Chapel 3" CDR (Tchantinler, 2007) – Audience member-limited edition of 47.
- The Journey – CD EP (Self-released, 2006 – reissued on Kning Disk, 2008)
- The Far Golden Peak Part One CDR (Blackest Rainbow Records, 2007) Limited to 333 copies on cd, 33 copies of cassette.
- Seventh Step – Tour CDR (Self-released, 2007)
- Black Morning – Cass, S/Sided (Sloow Tapes, 2007) Limited to 100 copies.
- The Holy Harbour – 10" EP (Twisted Nerve, 2007)
- VVIIW – CDR (Self-released, 2008)

=== Live albums ===
- Solo Guitar Recordings – US Tour CDR (Self-released, 2006)
- Night time recordings from Göteborg CD (Kning Disk, 2008), as Rick Tomlinson

=== Singles ===
- "An Hour Before Dawn" – 7" single (Twisted Nerve, 2006)
- "The Firefly Dusk" – 7" single (Twisted Nerve, 2006)
- "Kafamdaki Yangin" – 7" single (Twisted Nerve, 2007) Limited to 500 copies.

=== Splits ===
- "Svarka" (Rick Tomlinson w/ Chris Walmsley) – Split 7" single (Twisted Nerve, 2003)
- "Gone on the Way To Know" – Split 7" with Hush Arbors (Great Pop Supplement, 2007)

=== Appearances on compilation albums ===
- A Kind of Awe And Reverence and Wonder – CD on Twisted Nerve
- Ihmettelenpä Sanoi Kampela Jos Lahana on Pliisu – CDR on 267 Lattajjaa records (Limited to 100 copies)
- Now Is The Winter of Our Discount Tents – CD on Twisted Nerve
