= The Silver Globe =

Studio album by Jane Weaver
- Released: 20 October 2014
- Genre: Pop
- Length: 47:00
- Label: Finders Keepers
- Producer: Jane Weaver

Jane Weaver chronology
The Watchbird Alluminate (2011)	The Silver Globe (2014)	The Amber Light (2015)

Professional ratings
Aggregate scores
Source	Rating
Album of the Year	85/100
Metacritic	82/100
Review scores
Source	Rating
AllMusic	4.5/5 stars
The Arts Desk	5/5 stars
Exclaim!	9/10
The Guardian	4/5 stars
Mojo	4/5 stars
musicOMH	4/5 stars
NME	3.5/5 stars
Record Collector	4/5 stars
The Times	4/5 stars
Uncut	8/10

The Silver Globe is the sixth studio album by the English singer Jane Weaver, released on 20 October 2014 by Finders Keepers.

== Track listing ==
Side one
No.	Title	Length
1.	"The Silver Globe"	0:46
2.	"Argent"	8:05
3.	"The Electric Mountain"	5:43
4.	"If Only We Could Be in Love"	4:50
5.	"Don't Take My Soul"	6:34

Side two
No.	Title	Length
6.	"Cells"	3:56
7.	"Mission Desire"	5:22
8.	"Stealing Gold"	4:42
9.	"Arrows"	2:31
10.	"Your Time in This Life Is Just Temporary"	4:31
Total length:		47:00
