= Malcolm Mooney =

American singer, poet and artist (born 1944)

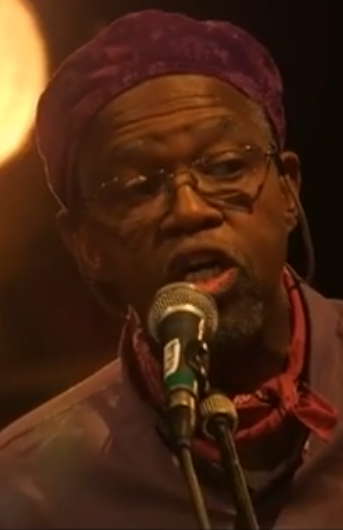
- Mooney performing with Pavees Dance in 2014

Background information
- Also known as: Desse, Mooney, M. Mooney
- Born: 1944 (age 81–82); Yonkers, New York, U.S.
- Genres: Experimental rock, Krautrock
- Instrument: Vocals
- Years active: 1968-present
- Member of: Malcolm Mooney and the Tenth Planet
- Formerly of: Can; Pavees Dance
- Website: malcolmmooney.com

Malcolm R. Mooney (born 1944) is an American singer, poet, and artist, best known as the original vocalist for German krautrock band Can.

== Biography ==
=== Early life ===
Malcolm Mooney's father, after serving in the navy, became a jazz piano player who had once been taught in North Carolina by a former teacher of Nina Simone. Mooney spent his early life in Westchester County. Attracted to music from an early age, he made attempts at learning accordion, clarinet, and saxophone. In high school Mooney joined a cappella group known as the "Six-Fifths". Later, Mooney moved in with his sister in the Mission Hill district of Boston, where he attended the arts programme at Boston University, striving to become a painter and sculptor. While residing in Boston, Mooney got to know composer Ivan Tcherepnin and his wife.

After his move to New York City, Mooney gained some fame as a sculptor. In 1967, Mooney and his friend, Joshua Zim, left the United States, escaping the potential conscription to the Vietnam war. They embarked on a journey leaving New York on plane, flying through Reykjavík, reaching Luxembourg, then hitching a ride to Paris. Serge Tcherepnin, Ivan Tcherepnin's brother, invited them to use his apartment in Paris while he was in the country, sharing space with Portuguese composer Emmanuel Nunes. After their brief stay, Mooney and Zim continued to hitch hike southwards through France, reaching the southern coast of Spain to get a passage to Morocco, intending to continue their eastward journey by camel across north Africa, but the Strait of Gibraltar crossing was shut down at that time and they were blocked at the port of Algeciras. Mooney and Zim spent three weeks in the Formentera and continued traveling across the Mediterranean and reaching Bombay. After a brief stay, they hitch hiked back to Europe, arriving in Paris in late August or early September 1968, where Mooney met Hildegard Schmidt, spouse of German composer Irmin Schmidt. Hildegard, learning Malcolm was an aspiring painter, invited him to come to Cologne and make connections with the German art world. In April 1968, Mooney parted ways with his friend Zim and took a flight to Cologne, reaching out to the Schmidt household who agreed to let him live in their apartment.

=== Career ===
During his time in Cologne, Malcolm Mooney became friends with Irmin Schmidt and Holger Czukay, who were forming a band and accepted to join them as lead vocalist. The band was originally known as "Inner Space", but Mooney came up with "The Can", later shortened to Can. Czukay showed him an instrumental tape and asked him to come up with accompanying lyrics, which turned out as "Father Cannot Yell" on Monster Movie, reminiscing about his pilgrimage and taking inspiration from the relationship between Zim and his girlfriend who left during his journey. This song marked a determining moment for the band, the time when, as Holger admitted, "Can wasn't sure yet which way musically to go till Malcolm jumped one day to the microphone and pushed us into A RHYTHM". Irmin told Ptolemaic Terrascope, Malcolm's arrival "gave the group the last kick toward rock".

Mooney recorded enough material with Can to assemble them into their debut album, initially entitled as Prepared To Meet Thy Pnoom. At that time no record company was willing to release the recordings, but eventually they were released in 1981 as Delay 1968. Can's second album became their debut, Monster Movie, released in 1969. It was successful in the German underground scene. Various other tracks that Mooney recorded with the band during this period appear on the compilation albums Soundtracks and Unlimited Edition. Mooney quit the band and returned to America soon after the recording of Monster Movie, having been told by a psychiatrist that getting away from the chaotic music of Can would be better for his mental health. The liner notes from the album claim erroneously that Mooney suffered a nervous breakdown, shouting "upstairs, downstairs" repeatedly.

Mooney reunited with Can in 1986 to record a one-off reunion album, Rite Time. He also has released three albums with the San Francisco Bay Area band Tenth Planet, on the first of which, a new version of the song "Father Cannot Yell" from Monster Movie appears. For the second Tenth Planet album, a different line-up was introduced, and the album saw a limited release in Japan on the P-Vine label. Prior to its issue, the Unfortunate Miracle label issued a limited 7" picture disc single containing two early mixes from the forthcoming album. In 2002, Mooney was invited to sing on Andy Votel's "All Ten Fingers" album – on the song "Salted Tangerines", a version of Mooney's poem of the same name. The Tenth Planet released an album on Milviason Records entitled inCANtations. Mooney now focuses on his visual art. In 2007, Matthew Higgs invited Mooney to exhibit a piece at New York's venerable White Columns.

In 2013, Mooney began to collaborate with drummer, songwriter and producer Sean Noonan, along with Jamaaladeen Tacuma and Aram Bajakian, to record Pavees Dance: There's Always the Night. The group performed in February 2014 at the Sons D'Hiver festival in France in advance of the release of the June 2014 release of the CD and accompanying book featuring lyrics and Mooney's art work.

In April 2017, Mooney appeared at the Barbican Centre in the City of London as the lead singer of The Can Project, a reunion concert with Irmin Schmidt joined by Sonic Youth's Thurston Moore and My Bloody Valentine's Debbie Googe. Jaki Liebezeit, Can's drummer, had recently died. The concert received mixed reviews and suffered sound issues, especially with Mooney's vocals.

In 2021, Mooney's work was exhibited at Aspen Art Museum in the exhibition Winterfest.

In 2022, Mooney had an exhibition at Ulrik in New York titled "Works 1970-1986." Mooney produced his first geometric works in 1970 as set designs for a theater play titled "Harlem Angel". Shortly after he began work on a series of eponymous silk screens at his father’s print shop in Yonkers, New York. He describes the origin of these pieces as developed from an image of kente cloth viewed under a microscope. This image continued to inform his paintings and drawings of grids throughout the 1970s and 1980s. Mooney’s interest evolved further through his encounter with the 1972 exhibition “African Textiles and Decorative Arts” at the Museum of Modern Art, his friendship with textile curator and shopkeeper Sara Penn as well as his own work in the mechanical processes of textile design.

From experiments with utilitarian objects to stage and lighting design, from graphic design to work with textiles, clothing, and even runway shows, there persists an ongoing migration between the applied and “high art” in Mooney’s work which intentionally cross-pollinates both.

== Discography ==
Malcolm Mooney appears on the following original albums:

With Can:

- Monster Movie (1969)
- Soundtracks (1970)
- Unlimited Edition (1976) – compilation, includes all the tracks on earlier Limited Edition
- Delay 1968 (1981) – compilation
- Rite Time (1989)
- Anthology (1994) – compilation
- The Lost Tapes (2012) – compilation, 3-CD and 5-LP box set

With Tenth Planet:

- Malcolm Mooney and the Tenth Planet (1998)
- Hysterica (2006)
- inCANtations (2011)

White Columns: with Luis Tovar and Alex Marcelo

- Malcolm Mooney (2011)

With Andy Votel:

- All Ten Fingers (2002)

With Dave Tyack

- Rip Van Winkle (2003)

With Sean Noonan

- Pavees Dance: There's Always the Night (2014)
- Tan Man's Hat (2019)

With Jane Weaver

- Modern Kosmology (2017)

== Videography ==
- Romantic Warriors IV: Krautrock (2019)

== Notes ==
=== Works cited ===
- Young, Rob; Schmidt, Irmin (2018). All Gates Open: The Story of Can. London: Faber and Faber. ISBN 978-0571311491.
