= Demdike Stare =

English dark ambient electronic music duo

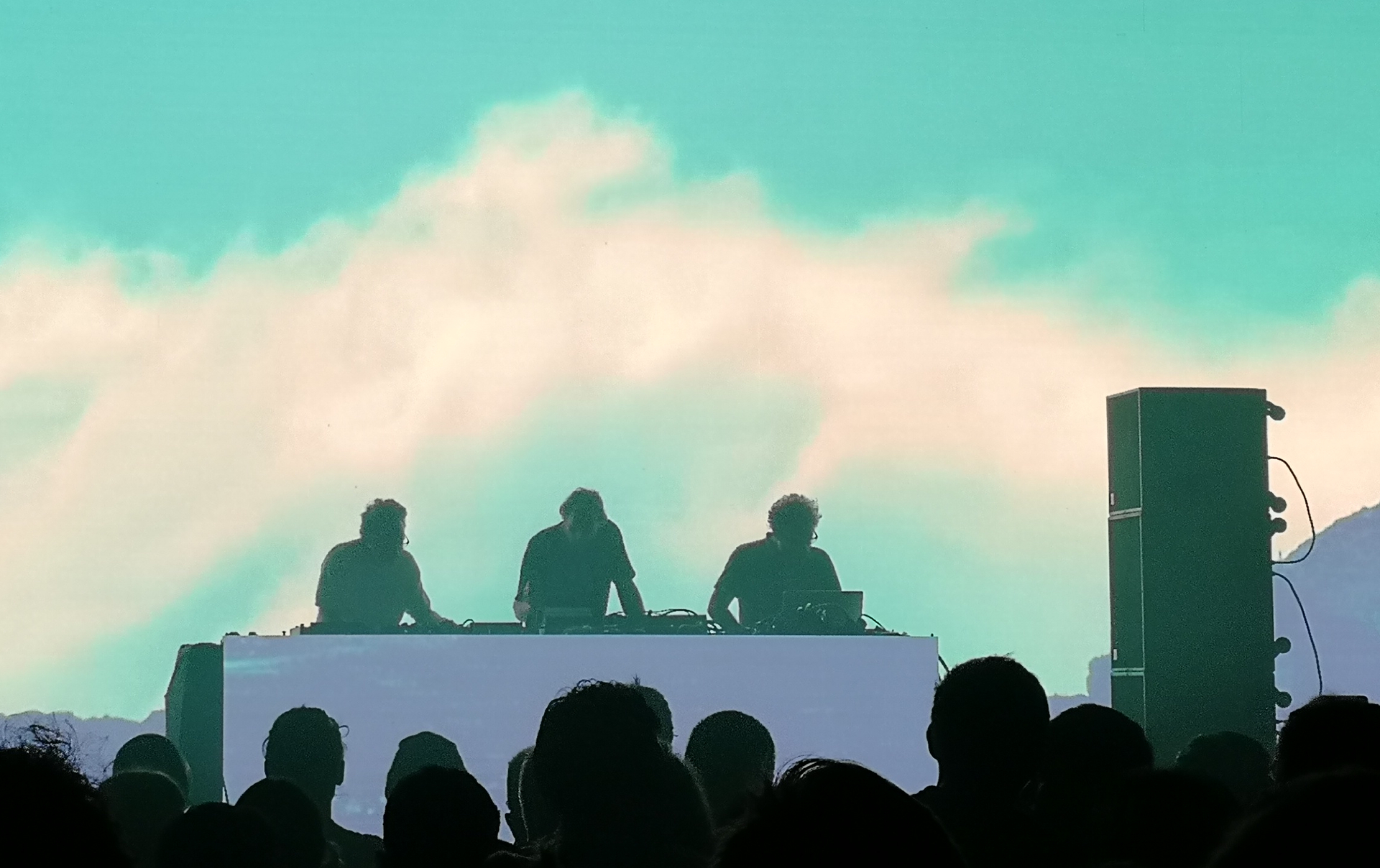
- Demdike Stare @ Present Perfect, St Petersburg, Russia 2019

Background information
- Origin: Manchester, United Kingdom
- Genres: Dark ambient, ambient dub, electronic, IDM
- Years active: 2009–present
- Labels: Modern Love
- Members: Sean Canty; Miles Whittaker

Demdike Stare is an English dark ambient and electronic music duo formed by DJ Sean Canty and producer Miles Whittaker. The project was conceived in 2009 and is based in Manchester.

== History ==
Demdike Stare was formed in 2009 by Sean Canty and Miles Whittaker, both of whom were already well-established in Manchester's music scene. Whittaker is also known for his work in Pendle Coven and under his solo projects, MLZ, Daughter of the Industrial Revolution, Suum Cuique, and Miles. Canty is a respected DJ and also known for his involvement with Finders Keepers, an archival label based in Manchester and London. Their mixtapes and albums incorporate a wide variety of influence from jazz to library music and industrial. They have steadily shifted their sound and setup throughout the span of the project.

== Discography ==
Studio albums

- Liberation Through Hearing (Modern Love, 2010)
- Voices of Dust (Modern Love, 2010)
- Wonderland (Modern Love, 2016)
- Passion (Modern Love, 2018)
- Sketches of Everything (with Jon Collin) (Modern Love, 2020)

Compilation albums

- Symbiosis (Modern Love, 2009)
- Tryptych (Modern Love, 2011)
- Elemental (Modern Love, 2012)

Extended plays

- Demdike Stare (Modern Love, 2009)
- Demdike Stare (Modern Love, 2009)
- Forest of Evil (Modern Love, 2010)
- Elemental Parts One & Two: Chrysanthe & Violetta (Modern Love, 2011)
- Elemental Part Three: Rose (Modern Love, 2012)
- Elemental Part Four: Iris (Modern Love, 2012)

Singles

- Testpressing #001 (Modern Love, 2013)
- Testpressing #002 (Modern Love, 2013)
- Testpressing #003 (Modern Love, 2013)
- Testpressing #004 (Modern Love, 2013)
- Testpressing #005 (Modern Love, 2014)
- Testpressing #006 (Modern Love, 2014)
- Testpressing #007 (Modern Love, 2015)
