= Andy Votel =

English musician, DJ, record producer and graphic designer (born 1975)

- Born: Andrew Shallcross; 4 November 1975 (age 50); Marple Bridge, Stockport, England
- Andy Votel's voice Recorded 2013

Andrew Shallcross (born 4 November 1975), known as Andy Votel, is an English musician, DJ, record producer, graphic designer and co-founder of Twisted Nerve Records and the reissue label Finders Keepers Records.

== As musician ==
=== Violators of the English Language ===
Votel began making music in the late 1980s as the youngest member of the group Violators of the English Language (from which the VOTEL stage name is derived). The group appeared on the Howard Jacobson BBC documentary Think of England in 1991 performing a rap song with a young DJ Semtex as a backing dancer. Violators of the English Language failed to gain label interest as a group but Fat City released the Violators of the English Language instrumental tracks as VOTEL in 1996.

=== Solo career ===
In 2000 Votel signed to XL Records. He recorded two albums for the label, Styles of the Unexpected (2000) and All Ten Fingers (2002). These albums featured original Can singer Malcolm Mooney, Guy Garvey, Gramme, and Jane Weaver. Votel's music is often released under a pseudonym. His aliases include Applehead, Anworth Kirk, Tandy Love, Xian Orphic, Slant Azymuth, Neotantrik, and Tony Deval.

== As DJ ==
Having built a reputation through Violators of the English Language, Votel began mixing psychedelic music with jazz and hip-hop records at clubs like The Hacienda and Home And South from the early 1990s. He is an internationally renowned DJ and has performed at events such as Sonar, All Tomorrow's Parties, and the Green Man Festival. Votel founded the B-Music DJ Collective alongside ex-Hacienda DJ and journalist John Maccready. Other B-Music collaborators include David Holmes, Belle And Sebastian, Edan, Bob Stanley, and Gruff Rhys. Votel has presented shows for Radio 4 such as 2011's Free Wales Harmony, which documented the history of Welsh protest music. He appears regularly alongside Stuart Maconie on The Freakier Zone show on BBC 6 Music.

== As record producer and remixer ==
Votel has produced extensively for Badly Drawn Boy, including tracks on the Mercury Music Prize winning album The Hour of Bewilderbeast. He has also produced music for Gruff Rhys including the single 'Shark Ridden Waters' on the album Hotel Shampoo. Votel has also remixed or produced material for Ian Brown, The Avalanches, Lamb, Elastica, Texas, Death in Vegas, Kings of Convenience, Tim Burgess, Broadcast, and Elbow, among others. Votel also creates mix compilation CDs, including the Music To Watch Girls Cry series, Vertigo Mixed, a compilation of rare tracks from the Vertigo Records catalogue, Brazilika, rare Brazilian tracks and Hungaraton, rare Hungarian music.

== As record label founder ==
=== Twisted Nerve ===
In 1997 Votel met Badly Drawn Boy and the pair founded the label Twisted Nerve, initially to release music by Badly Drawn Boy and Dave Tyack. The label then expanded, releasing the earliest recordings of many other artists including Doves, Elbow, PlanningToRock, and Alfie.

=== Finders Keepers ===
In 1999 Votel, along with Doug Shipton and Dom Thomas, founded the reissue label Finders Keepers. The debut release was a reissue of the then-obscure L'enfant Assassin Des Mouches by Jean-Claude Vannier. The label then carved a niche in reissuing vinyl obscurities from around the world, tracking down artists such as Selda Bagcan, Bruno Spoerri and Jean-Pierre Massiera.

=== Other labels ===
Votel co-runs Bird records with Jane Weaver and co-runs Pre-Cert Home Entertainment with Demdike Stare and Boomkat.

== As graphic designer ==
Votel is a graphic designer and has created over 150 record sleeves. Notable artists to use his graphic design work include Gilles Peterson, Badly Drawn Boy, David Holmes, and Cate Le Bon. He has also designed campaigns for Adidas, Stüssy, Levi, and Adam Et Rope. He was also the in-house designer for Fat City. Votel teaches part-time at Stockport Design College.

== Personal life ==
Votel is married to musician Jane Weaver.

== Other activity ==
Votel has been the curator of a number of events including the 2006 event at the Barbican Centre celebrating the music of Jean-Claude Vannier and Serge Gainsbourg. This event reunited musicians who played on the albums Histoire de Melody Nelson and L'enfant Assassin des Mouches. It also featured a number of contemporary artists as guest vocalists including Jarvis Cocker, Badly Drawn Boy, Brigitte Fontaine, The Bad Seeds' Mick Harvey and Gruff Rhys. Other notable events include Barbican shows with Magma, Jean-Pierre Massiera and Polish composer Andrzej Korzyński and assisting Jarvis Cocker with the 2007 Meltdown Festival. He also curated 2013's Festival Number 6 at Portmeirion.

Votel writes about outsider music for websites such as Red Bull Music Academy.

== Discography ==
=== Singles ===
- "If Six Was Nine" (12", Grand Central Records, 1996)
- "Canter" (7", Sluts Small, 1999, split single with Add N to X)
- "Whirlpool" (Twisted Nerve Records)
- "The Amazing Transplant EP" – with Cherrystones (12", Stark Reality, 1999)
- "Girl on a Go-ped" / "Return of the Spooky Driver" (Twisted Nerve Records)
- "Girl on a Go-ped" (Remix) (Twisted Nerve Records)

=== Albums ===
- Styles of the Unexpected (Twisted Nerve Records, 2000)
- All Ten Fingers (Twisted Nerve Records, 2002)

=== Compilations ===
- Music To Watch Girls Cry (2003)
- Folk Is Not a Four Letter Word (2005)
- Vertigo Mixed (2005)
- Songs in the Key of Death (2005)
- Songs of Insolence (2005)
- Welsh Rare Beat (2005)
- Prog Is Not a Four Letter Word (2006)
- One Nation Under a Grave (2007)
- Vintage Voltage (2010)
