= Jack Cooper (English musician) =

English musician (born 1980)

- Born: Jack Oliver Cooper; February 1980 (age 46); Blackpool, England
- Genres: Alternative rock, indie rock
- Occupation: Musician
- Instruments: Vocals, guitar
- Years active: 2004–present
- Labels: Twisted Nerve, My Dad Recordings, Trouble in Mind, Bella Union
- Member of: Modern Nature
- Formerly of: The Beep Seals, Mazes, Ultimate Painting

Jack Oliver Cooper (born February 1980) is an English singer, composer and guitarist. Currently a member of Modern Nature, Cooper was previously a member of The Beep Seals, Mazes and Ultimate Painting.

== Biography ==
Cooper was born in Blackpool, and re-located to Manchester in the early 2000s. In 2003, he signed to Twisted Nerve Records and released the song Hope I Don't Cry on a 7" single with 2 other artists which was issued as part of the label's mail order single subscription service. In 2004, Cooper released his debut EP in the form of Turn The Light Off on My Dad Recordings.

=== The Beep Seals ===
My Dad Recordings was the home of local musician Jim Noir, who helped Cooper record demos with his backing band for a possible debut album. However, instead of continuing to pursue a solo career Cooper served as part of Noir's backing band along with former Alfie guitarist Ian Smith on drums. The musicians dubbed themselves The Beep Seals and helped Noir record and tour his debut album Tower of Love, which was released in December 2005. Following tour commitments, the band parted ways with Jim Noir and began working on their own material with Cooper and Smith co-fronting. Commenting on the formation of the band, Cooper stated that they "all gelled immediately as a band. Me and Ian bonded straight away over obscure psychedelic records, and stuff like that first EP by The Aliens. I was thinking of packing in my solo stuff, anyway, and Ian was looking for a new band after Alfie finished". Through 2007, the band released 2 singles in the form of Tell Your Friends and Stars. In 2008, the band released their debut album Things That Roar, which was produced by Teenage Fanclub frontman Norman Blake. They split up in April 2009, cancelling their last planned gig which was part of an all day gig in Glasgow dubbed BeepFest.

=== Mazes ===
In 2009, Cooper formed Mazes. Initially conceived as a solo project following the split of the Beep Seals, after some early lineup changes the band lineup was completed by bassist Neil Robinson and drummer Conan Roberts. The band went on to release 3 albums proper; A Thousand Heys in 2011, Ores & Minerals in 2013 and Wooden Aquarium in 2014. Commenting on how the band worked together, Cooper revealed that "on the first record back in 2011, the songs were almost entirely fully formed. And then on Ores the songs were constructed around loops and I think of that record as being a mood board of how we want to sound in the long run. With the new stuff, I’m still bringing in the seeds of songs but we’re collaborating a lot more in the arrangement and vibe. Neil and Conan both have really great taste".

=== Ultimate Painting ===
Following the quiet disbandment of Mazes, in 2014 Cooper began working with former Veronica Falls member James Hoare and formed Ultimate Painting. The band signed to US record label Trouble in Mind and released 3 albums in quick succession; Ultimate Painting in 2014, Green Lanes in 2015 and Dusk in 2016. Commenting on the productivity of the band, Cooper commented that "after we made the first record I knew that this is something we’d be doing for a while but to do three records in three years does feel like an achievement. Being completely honest, it’s not always easy. We’re two very different people and we disagree about even the tiniest thing". In August 2017, Cooper released his debut solo album Sandgrown via Trouble in Mind, influenced by his childhood in Blackpool.

In January 2018, Ultimate Painting announced that their fourth album Up was set for release in the following April via Bella Union and shared lead-single Not Gonna Burn Myself Anymore. A UK tour to coincide with the release was announced and put on sale. On 12 February 2018, Jack Cooper announced that the band were splitting up, adding that "the partnership at the core of this band has always been a very fragile thing, but due to an irreconcilable breakdown we will no longer be working with each other". The previously announced album release was cancelled at Cooper's express request and the UK tour to support it was also cancelled.

=== Modern Nature ===
In February 2019, Cooper unveiled his new band Modern Nature, announcing their debut EP Nature which was released in March via Bella Union. Commenting on the lineup of the band, Cooper revealed that "the band is so new, it's hard to say who's in and who isn't. At the moment it's myself and Will Young (Beak>), with Aaron Neveu on drums (Woods/Herbcraft), Rupert Gillett on cello and then Jeff Tobias on saxophone". Young also previously played live with Ultimate Painting, and Tobias is a member of US band Sunwatchers

During the early months of the 2020 pandemic, Cooper and Modern Nature's collaborators launched a sprawling improvisation project called Cycles which was followed by a mini-album Annual which built on the jazz influenced direction explored on a series of self released improvisation cassettes featuring Cooper and collaborator Jeff Tobias.

In the summer of 2021, Cooper and collaborator Jeff Tobias released an album of Cooper's composed music called 'Tributaries' on the American jazz label Astral Spirits. The album received plaudits, particularly Downbeat magazine who described it as "conversational, neither overly composed nor overly improvisational. The systems within feel as if they could go on forever in an infinite loop. Tributaries uses space and pacing to good effect throughout. Tobias plays the perfect foil to Cooper’s guitar playing, highlighting the compositions without overpowering Cooper’s guitar. Cooper describes the aim as “melodic collectivism” and Tributaries gets there."

In 2021, Modern Nature released an ambitious project called 'Island Of Noise' which incorporated a second LP called 'Island Of Silence' and a book with contributors such as Merlin Sheldrake and Booker nominated poet Robin Robertson.

In 2023, Modern Nature released No Fixed Point In Space, an album that pushed the music further into the world of free-jazz and modern compositional music. Cooper worked with musicians from the avant-garde chamber group Apartment House, Chris Abrahams from The Necks, as well as legendary vocalist Julie Tippetts.

Cooper has received some acclaim as a composer of avant-garde classical music. In 2022, Astral Spirits released a recording of a piece called Arrival that was performed by members of Apartment House and pianist Alexander Hawkins. In his column on contemporary classical music for Bandcamp Peter Margasak wrote "The gorgeous recording imparts a satisfying physicality to each instrument while making no effort to hide the incidental sounds of the room or a player shifting in their chair. It almost feels like we’re eavesdropping. The recording is deceptively simple, but the rapport is stunning."

In 2024 the BBC Concert Orchestra commissioned a new piece of music from Cooper tilted 'Triptych For Orchestra'. It was performed by the orchestra at the Queen Elizabeth Hall in London on 1 May 2024.

== Discography ==
=== The Beep Seals ===
- 2008 - Things That Roar - Heron Recordings

=== Mazes ===
- 2011 - A Thousand Heys - FatCat Records
- 2011 - IBB Tape - Italian Beach Babes
- 2013 - Ores & Minerals - FatCat Records
- 2013 - Better Ghosts - Fat Cat Records
- 2014 - Wooden Aquarium - FatCat Records

=== Ultimate Painting ===
- 2014 - Ultimate Painting - Trouble in Mind
- 2015 - Green Lanes - Trouble in Mind
- 2015 - Live At Third Man Records - Third Man
- 2016 - Dusk - Trouble in Mind
- 2018 - Up! - Bella Union

=== Solo ===
- 2004 - Turn The Light Off EP - My Dad Recordings
- 2017 - Sandgrown - Trouble in Mind
- 2021 - Tributaries (with Jeff Tobias) - Astral Spirits

=== Modern Nature ===
- 2019 - Nature EP - Bella Union
- 2019 - How To Live - Bella Union
- 2020 - Annual - Bella Union
- 2021 - Island Of Noise - Bella Union
- 2021 - Island Of Silence - Bella Union
- 2023 - No Fixed Point in Space - Bella Union
- 2025 - The Heat Warps - Bella Union
