= Ultimate Painting =

English alternative rock band (2014–2018)

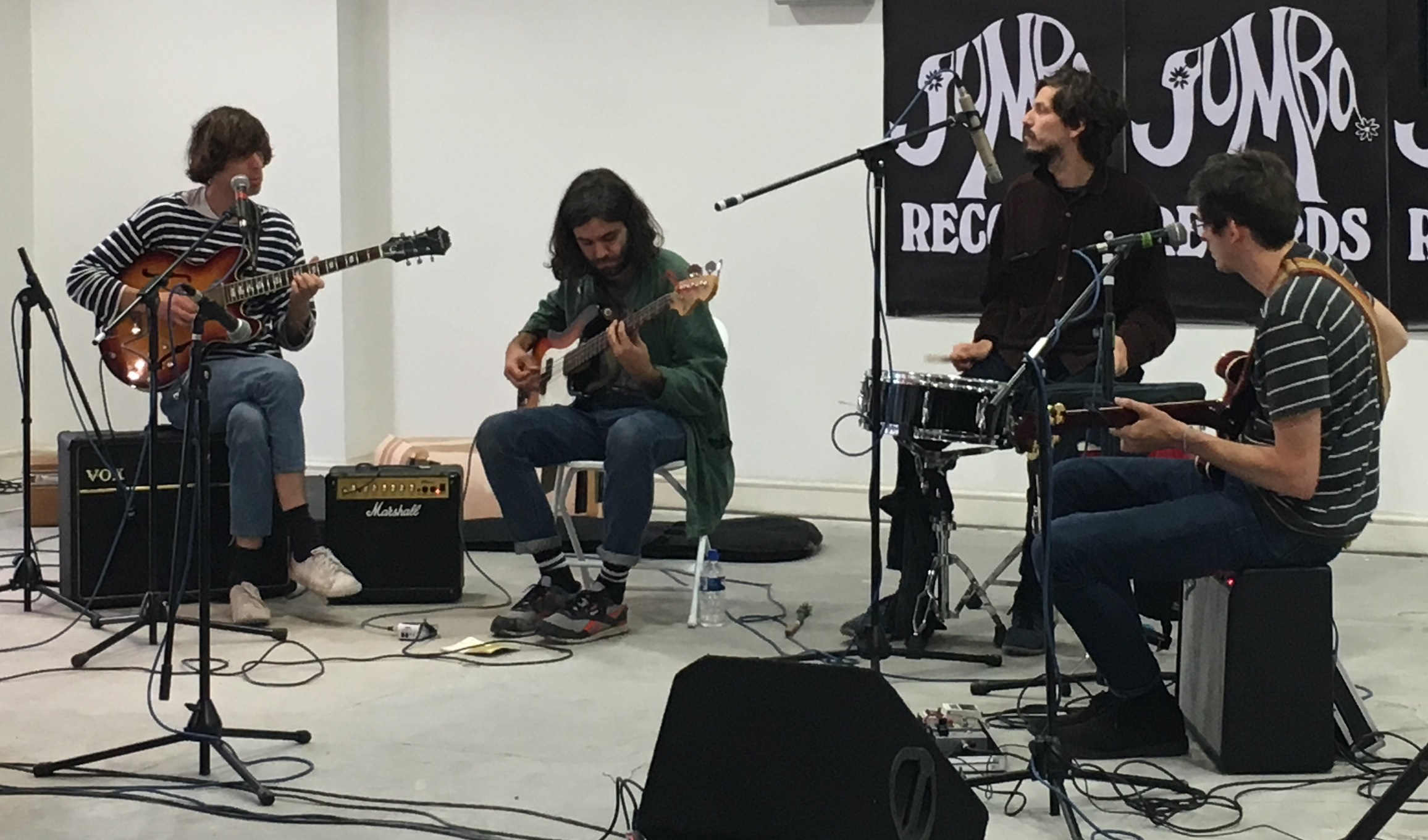
- Ultimate Painting performing at Jumbo Records, Leeds, September 2016

Background information
- Origin: London, England
- Genres: Indie rock
- Years active: 2014–2018
- Labels: Trouble in Mind; Bella Union
- Spinoff of: Mazes; Veronica Falls
- Past members: Jack Cooper; James Hoare
- Website: ultimatepainting.tumblr.com

Ultimate Painting were an English alternative rock band, formed in London in 2014. The band was composed of co-frontmen Jack Cooper and James Hoare, with a revolving cast of rhythm sections. The band were named after a painting made by the Drop City art community in Colorado in the late 1960s.

== History ==
The band were formed in 2014 by Blackpool-born singer-guitarist Jack Cooper, who previously fronted Mazes and co-fronted Beep Seals with ex-Alfie guitarist Ian Smith, and Torbay-born singer-guitarist James Hoare, who co-fronts Proper Ornaments and also co-fronted Veronica Falls.

The band signed to Trouble in Mind and released their self-titled debut album in 2014. Follow-up album Green Lanes was released in 2015, and the third album Dusk on 30 September 2016.

In October 2017, the band signed to UK label Bella Union and it was confirmed that the band were working on their next album at James Hoare's home studio. On 29 January 2018, the band released Not Gonna Burn Myself Anymore as a digital single and revealed the release date of fourth album Up! for April.

On 12 February 2018, Jack Cooper announced that the band were splitting up, adding that "the partnership at the core of this band has always been a very fragile thing, but due to an irreconcilable breakdown we will no longer be working with each other". The previously announced album release was cancelled at Cooper's express request and the UK tour to support it was also cancelled. Cooper commented on 6 April 2018, the proposed release day of Up!, that he had "had lots of emails, messages and questions about the unreleased UP album ever coming out. I reeeaaally appreciate the curiosity but no, it isn’t coming out. I’m onto to something really fresh and exciting so sit tight!".

== Discography ==
=== Albums ===
- Ultimate Painting (2014)
- Green Lanes (2015)
- Dusk (2016)
- Up! (2018 - unreleased)

=== Live albums ===
- Live at Third Man Records (2016)
