= The Beep Seals =

English psychedelic indie rock band (2006–2009)

- Origin: Manchester, England
- Genres: Alternative rock, Indie rock
- Years active: 2006–2009
- Labels: Heron Recordings; Kings And Creatures; Kurofune
- Spinoffs: Mazes
- Spinoff of: Alfie
- Past members: Ian Smith; Jack Cooper; Sam Morris; Jay Sikora; Phil Anderson; Milo Scaglioni; Jay Sikora
- Website: www.myspace.com/beepseals

The Beep Seals were an English psychedelic indie rock band from Manchester.

== Career ==
The Beep Seals were formed in 2006 by former Alfie guitarist Ian Smith, Jack Cooper, Phil Anderson and Milo Scaglioni. They began working on demos after touring with Jim Noir in support of his Tower of Love album as his backing band. In October 2006, the band played their first gig (a tribute to the recently deceased Syd Barrett) drafting in drummer Jay Sikora. Milo Scaglioni left in 2007, and in 2008 joined a band from his native Italy, Jennifer Gentle Before the recording of the band's debut album, former Alfie bassist Sam Morris joined the band.

In April 2007, the Beep Seals recorded their first single, "Tell Your Friends" / "I Used to Work at the Zoo", which was released on vinyl via Kings & Creature Recordings. After their second release on London's Heron Recordings, "Stars" / "Chariot Song", the band began work on their debut album, Things That Roar which was released in the UK on Heron Recordings and in Japan on Kurofune Records.

In support of Things That Roar, The Beep Seals supported and toured with Jarvis Cocker, Dead Meadow, Teenage Fanclub, The Fall, The Ting Tings, British Sea Power, Vetiver, Camera Obscura and Acid Mothers Temple.

It was announced on 1 April 2009 via the band's MySpace that the band had split up. The final gig was set for May in Glasgow at Beepfest - a festival set around the band, but this was cancelled at the last minute.

Cooper went on to form Mazes, who have released three albums on FatCat Records and Ultimate Painting.

== Appearances ==
- The band appeared at a variety of music festivals in the UK: Green Man Festival, Latitude Festival, Secret Garden Party and Llama.
- The Beep Seals have been championed by BBC 6Music's Marc Riley, recording three live sessions for him in 2007.
- Their track "Stars and Biting Glass" has been used on the BBC Three comedy Massive.
- "I Used to Work at the Zoo" has been used by the BBC on their television programme Animal Park.

== Discography ==
- April 2007 - "Tell Your Friends" / "I Used to Work at the Zoo" 7" (Kings & Creatures)
- August 2007 - "Stars" / "Chariot Song" 7" Heron Recordings
- December 2007 - "Beep Seals Sampler" (Limited edition)
- June 2008 - Things That Roar - album - Heron Recordings
