= Mazes (band) =

Musical band (2009–2016)

- Origin: Manchester, England
- Genres: Indie rock
- Years active: 2009–2016
- Labels: FatCat; Italian Beach Babes; Sex Is Disgusting
- Spinoffs: Ultimate Painting
- Spinoff of: The Beep Seals
- Past members: Jack Cooper; Jay Sikora; Jarin Tabata; Conan Roberts; Neil Robinson

Mazes were an English indie rock band, formed in Manchester in 2009. The band consisted of Jack Cooper on vocals and guitar, Conan Roberts on bass and Neil Robinson on drums.

== History ==
Mazes was initially a recording project for Blackpool-born singer-songwriter Jack Cooper, following the split of The Beep Seals which he co-fronted with former Alfie guitarist Ian Smith (and originated as a live backing band for Jim Noir). He recruited Jay Sikora and Jarin Tabata in 2009 to tour. The band released two 7" singles with Brighton's Sex Is Disgusting Records. Neil Robinson soon joined as a permanent drummer alongside Conan Roberts on bass. A 30-song tape cassette called IBB Tape released on Robert's own label Italian Beach Babes, and a 7" single released on Jack Cooper's label Suffering Jukebox (Cenetaph/Go-Betweens), caught the eye of Brighton's Fatcat Records and the band signed with them towards the end of 2010.

The band's debut album was recorded in a studio based in a boat on the River Thames and was released in April 2011. The band's sound was often likened to American bands such as Pavement and Sebadoh, as well as Flying Nun bands such as The Clean. The band played 2011's SXSW Music Festival and toured the United States twice with White Denim and Sebadoh.

Mazes' second album, Ores & Minerals, was released in February 2013 to positive reviews.

Their third album, Wooden Aquarium, released on 16 September 2014.

Following the release of the album, frontman Jack Cooper formed Ultimate Painting which he co-fronted with Veronica Falls member Jack Hoare. Drummer Neil Robinson toured with the band and appeared on some of their studio recordings. Bassist Conan Roberts went into video and film production, working for the likes of MTV and Disney.
