= Fishes and Dishes =

Fishes and Dishes may refer to:

- "Fishes and Dishes" (Battle for Dream Island), a 2023 web series episode
- "Fishes and Dishes", a song by Jim Noir on his 2012 album Jimmy's Show
