= Alfie (band) =

English indie rock band (1998–2005)

- Origin: Manchester, England
- Genres: Indie rock, folk rock
- Years active: 1998–2005
- Labels: Twisted Nerve; Regal Recordings
- Spinoffs: The Beep Seals
- Past members: Lee Gorton; Ian Smith; Matt McGeever; Sam Morris; Sean Kelly

Alfie were an English indie rock band, formed in 1998 in Manchester. The band were composed of singer Lee Gorton, guitarist-vocalist Ian Smith, drummer Sean Kelly, bassist Sam Morris and cellist-guitarist Matt McGeever.

Gorton admitted that the name Alfie "was just plucked out of the air", but with it being one of the first bands alphabetically had helped them as, for example, when the band "played All Tomorrow's Parties, it looked like we were headlining".

The band released four studio albums before disbanding in 2005.

== Twisted Nerve years (1999–2002) ==
The band was formed by Lee Gorton and Ian Smith, with Gorton commenting on the band's formation that "I knew a couple of the lads from Eccles in Salford where I’m from. They were friends of mine and had already been in bands and I knew they were f****** great already so I got them in. Then we got some music students". The band were close to local bands Doves, I Am Kloot and Elbow, with whom they shared a rehearsal studio. The band signed to Twisted Nerve Records in 1999 following an appearance on the In The City Key 103 Stevenson Square stage in 1998, and were simultaneously recruited by label co-owner Damon Gough (aka Badly Drawn Boy) to work on his debut album and perform as his live backing band. Gorton would later reveal that EMI had previously tried to sign the band, but that they were "stubborn little buggers because we wanted to keep it indie and on the coolest label around".

The band released 3 vinyl-only EP's on the label through 2000, the self-titled debut in February, second "Bookends" in August and third "Montevideo" in November. They released debut album, If You Happy with You Need Do Nothing in March 2001. Explaining the origin of album title, Gorton revealed that "It actually comes from when I was in my old flat and my dentist had changed hands, and I had this Asian dentist who wrote a letter in pidgin English saying 'oh I'm gonna be your new dentist now, if you wanna use your old dentist you have to do this, but if you happy with you need do nothing' and it was in brackets and it was like 'Wow.' So we kept that because it suits what we do". Although the album is technically a compilation of the previous EPs plus new songs Umlaut and 2 Up 2 Down, it is largely considered to be the band's debut and was promoted as such. The band had wanted to record the album afresh, but as Twisted Nerve were unwilling to finance studio time the band were forced to use the existing recordings. In September 2001, the band released a newly recorded version of You Make No Bones as a single. In December 2001, the band were forced to pull out of a gig in Glasgow after guitarist Ian Smith received an electric shock during the soundcheck when touching a microphone whilst some equipment had reportedly short circuited. He was treated as a local hospital for shock and burns to his hands.

== EMI/Regal Records years (2001–2005) ==
Following a falling out with the owners of Twisted Nerve and simply outgrowing the label, the band signed to EMI in October 2001. Commenting on leaving the label, Gorton revealed that "it costs money to go to America and we just couldn't do what we wanted to do with Twisted Nerve. We didn't get ads, video's or big tours" and that "They don’t treat us with respect, they aren’t prepared to put up any money for anything. They always threatened to cancel the tour support just before we went away, leaving us in a shambles. They refuse to speak to us, yet when they do we are treated like kids". Label co-owner Damon Gough responded by attacking the band during an appearance in Manchester.

The first release on EMI was a free 7" release featuring a cover of the Fat Larry's Band song Zoom which was given away at the Regal Recordings Christmas party. However, the band had already recorded the A Word in Your Ear (originally set to be called Get Alfie) album for Twisted Nerve who owned the rights to the recording, and wouldn't be released until March 2002. The band were fine with promoting the album for a label they had already left, but complained that again they would have preferred to have played more gigs but that the label were unable or unwilling to finance it. Commenting further on the restrictions of the band's former label, Gorton revealed that they never had enough time in the studio to record material, that the band's first two albums "definitely felt unfinished really" and that previous EP releases were vinyl only due to production costs. To make ends meet whilst signed to Twisted Nerve, Gorton ran a market stall in Manchester which members of the band also worked on.

Following the final release on Twisted Nerve, the band recorded third album, Do You Imagine Things? with Coldplay producer Ken Nelson. The album was released in September 2003 and praised as being "a great leap forward" and "a warm record [that is] above the indie quagmire". Despite the favourable reviews, the album failed to break the UK Top 40. Gorton admitted that "the label didn't really know what to do with the record because it was so schizophrenic" and radio refused to play anything off it". In February 2004, the band were forced to play a shortened set in Birmingham after guitarist Ian Smith failed to show up for the band's soundcheck or show. Although the police were contacted as the behaviour was out of character for Smith, he was found the following day safe and well and the band continued on their tour. In June 2004, the band were forced to cancel a string of festival appearances and warm up gigs after Gorton broken his arm whilst playing football.

The fourth album, Crying at Teatime was released in August 2005, and heralded in advance by Gorton as being full of "triumphant moments" and a "bigger sound'" than previous albums. The album was preceded by the single "Your Own Religion", which the band marked with 4 gigs across London in the north, south, east and west of the city. Again, reviews were favourable, proclaiming that the band had "finally found the missing piece of their jigsaw". In September 2005, the band were involved in a coach crash following a gig in Nottingham where their coach collided with a car that had previously been involved in an accident and had been left unattended with no lights on in the middle of the carriageway. Although the band were unharmed, their coach was written off and the driver attended hospital for back pains.

The band released the vinyl-only single "Where Did Our Loving Go?" on 10 October, with the release being spread across 3 different 7"s. The single peaked at No. 71 in the UK Singles Chart and dropped out of the charts the following week. On 26 October 2005, the band announced that they were to split up, with Gorton stating that "it's hard to keep faith when it feels like no-one's listening". Gorton later revealed that EMI "had made us play the game a little bit, we didn’t want to. They were saying, “Just write us one song like Coldplay and you can do whatever you want after that. Just give us something to go with”, but we couldn’t do it".

== Post break-up ==
Singer Lee Gorton has not performed or released new material since the band split, except for a guest vocal on a track "Buying a Lie" that appeared as a bonus track on the Unkle album War Stories. He initially focused on DJing and organising gigs for other artists in Stoke Newington, London, and then Manchester under the "Down at The Redbricks" moniker Plans for a “psychedelic supergroup” in which Gorton hoped to get singers from bands Alfie had previously toured with including The Flaming Lips, The Zutons and Snow Patrol to record vocals over songs written by unsigned acts he'd come across were seemingly abandoned. The project was to be released under the name "Red Thread" He has since gone on to co-run the Jackalope parlour bar in Chorlton, Manchester and currently works as Sales Director for First Chop Brewing Arm in Salford.

After the band split up, guitarist Ian Smith and bassist Sam Morris played in The Beep Seals who were active between 2006 and 2009. Smith co-fronted the band with Jack Cooper, who went on to form Mazes and Ultimate Painting. Morris now works as a music instructor at One Education Music.

Drummer Sean Kelly has gone on to work as a live sound engineer, working as Head of Sound for Trof who operate venues across Manchester including the Deaf Institute, Albert Hall and Gorilla.

Cellist Matt McGeever has continued performing, and recorded with Last Harbour and singer-songwriter Russell Kostulin who works under the Mammoeth moniker.

== Band members ==
- Lee Gorton (vocals)
- Ian Smith (guitar)
- Matt McGeever (guitar, cello)
- Sam Morris (bass, keyboards, french horn)
- Sean Kelly (drums)

== Discography ==
=== Studio albums ===
| Title | Album details | Peak chart positions | | |
| Title | Album details | UK | UK Indie | SCO |
|---|---|---|---|---|
| If You Happy With You Need Do Nothing | Released: March 2001; Label: Twisted Nerve (#TN026); Formats: CD, CS, LP | 62 | 3 | 76 |
| A Word in Your Ear | Released: March 2002; Label: Twisted Nerve (#TN038); Formats: CD, LP | 130 | 20 | — |
| Do You Imagine Things? | Released: September 2003; Label: Regal (#7243 591934); Formats: CD, LP | 137 | — | — |
| Crying at Teatime | Released: August 2005; Label: Regal (#0946 332222); Formats: CD, LP | 170 | — | — |
"—" denotes items that did not chart or were not released in that territory.

=== EPs ===
- "Alfie" (EP) (2000)
- "Bookends" (EP) (2000)
- "Montevideo" (EP) (2000)

=== Singles ===
| Year | Title | Peak chart positions | | | Album |
| Year | Title | UK | UK Indie | SCO | Album |
|---|---|---|---|---|---|
| 2001 | "You Make No Bones" | 61 | 5 | 62 | If You Happy with You Need Do Nothing |
| 2002 | "A Word in Your Ear" | 66 | 10 | 76 | A Word in Your Ear |
| 2003 | "People" | 53 | — | 60 | Do You Imagine Things? |
| 2003 | "Stuntman" | 51 | — | 69 | Do You Imagine Things? |
| 2004 | "No Need" | 66 | — | 68 | Do You Imagine Things? |
| 2005 | "Your Own Religion" | 61 | — | — | Crying at Teatime |
| 2005 | "Where Did Our Loving Go?" | 76 | — | 73 | Crying at Teatime |
"—" denotes items that did not chart or were not released in that territory.
