= Green Lanes (album) =

Studio album by Ultimate Painting
- Released: 7 August 2015
- Genre: Indie rock
- Label: Trouble in Mind

Singles from Imaginal Disk
- 1. "Break the Chain" Released: 2015; 2. "(I've Got The) Sanctioned Blues" Released: 2015

Green Lanes is a 2015 studio album by Ultimate Painting released through Trouble in Mind Records. The album featured two singles, "Break the Chain" and "(I've Got The) Sanctioned Blues". Upon release, the album received generally favorable reviews.

== Reception ==
Professional ratings
Review scores
Source	Rating
Allmusic	4/5
Consequence of Sound	C−
Drowned in Sound	7.10
The Skinny	3/5
Pitchfork	7.4/10
MusicOMH	3.5/5
NME	7/10
PopMatters	7/10
The Guardian	3/5
Under the Radar	7/10

According to review aggregator Metacritic, Green Lanes received "generally favorable" reviews.

== Track listing ==
Green Lanes track listing
No.	Title	Length
1.	"Kodiak"	3:08
2.	"Sweet Chris"	3:37
3.	"(I've Got The) Sanctioned Blues"	3:12
4.	"The Ocean"	2:35
5.	"Two From The Vault"	2:32
6.	"The Ocean (reprise)"	1:05
7.	"Break The Chain"	3:03
8.	"I Was Lost"	2:44
9.	"Tee Zee Em"	1:10
10.	"Paying The Price"	2:57
11.	"Woken By Noises"	2:08
12.	"Out In The Cold"	3:08
