= No Fixed Point in Space =

Studio album by Modern Nature
- Released: 29 September 2023
- Length: 41:20
- Label: Bella Union

Modern Nature chronology
Island Of Silence (2021)	No Fixed Point in Space (2023)

Singles from No Fixed Point in Space
- 1. "Murmuration" Released: 27 June 2023; 2. "Cascade" Released: 17 August 2023

No Fixed Point in Space is the third studio album by English musician Jack Cooper's music project Modern Nature. It was released on 29 September 2023 by Bella Union.

The album features collaborations by Anton Lukoszevieze, Mira Benjamin, Chris Abrahams and Julie Driscoll.

== Background ==
On 27 June 2023, Modern Nature announced the release of a new third studio album, along with a music video for the single 'Murmuration'.

The second single, Cascade was released on 17 August 2023, with Cooper saying of the single:

"Cascade is a link between the abstract colors of this record and the rhythms of the last one Island of Noise. The imagery is an attempt to convey how overwhelming the world can be when you make the time to really observe it. Beautiful, intricate and infinite. I was honored to be able to sing this round a microphone with the great Julie Tippetts... something I'll never forget."

== Critical reception ==
Professional ratings
Aggregate scores
Source	Rating
Metacritic	77/100
Review scores
Source	Rating
Loud and Quiet	7/10
Pitchfork	7.6/10
PopMatters	4/10
Uncut	4/5 stars
Under the Radar	8/10

No Fixed Point in Space was met with "generally favorable" reviews from critics. At Metacritic, which assigns a weighted average rating out of 100 to reviews from mainstream publications, this release received an average score of 77, based on 6 reviews.

Mark Moody of Under the Radar wrote: "As with all of Cooper's post Ultimate Painting work, he has assembled a group of highly skilled musicians, created a framework for them to explore, and has let them roam and ramble in a fluid environment of their own making. No Fixed Point in Space takes this even further as the confines of traditional popular music are disassembled, much as the animals dispersing on the album's cover convey a pushing away from the center. At Pitchfork, Louis Pattison described the release as "a subtler and more muted record than its predecessor, and somewhat stranger in the bargain." Writer John Bergstrom of PopMatters gave the release a 4 out of 10 stars, remarking "Despite its open orchestration and more experimental bent, it is Modern Nature's least interesting release."

=== Accolades ===
Publications' year-end list appearances for No Fixed Point in Space
Critic/Publication	List	Rank	Ref
God Is in the TV	God Is in the TV's Top 100 Albums of 2023	22	
Under the Radar	Under the Radar's Top 100 Albums of 2023	99	

== Track listing ==
No Fixed Point in Space track listing
No.	Title	Length
1.	"Tonic"	7:39
2.	"Murmuration"	6:55
3.	"Orange"	5:59
4.	"Cascade"	4:21
5.	"Sun"	6:21
6.	"Tapestry"	5:11
7.	"Ensõ"	4:54
Total length:		41:20
