= Snowgoose =

Snowgoose is a Scottish, Glasgow-based folk rock band. The band was formed as a three-piece with Jim McCulloch (formerly of The Soup Dragons and BMX Bandits) on guitar, Dave McGowan on bass and Anna Sheard on vocals. Raymond McGinley (guitar, of Teenage Fanclub) and Stuart Kidd (drums, of Euros Childs's band and BMX Bandits) joined to make the band a five-piece. The debut album Harmony Springs was released on vinyl (with download code) on 21 April 2012 as part of Record Store Day. A CD and download release followed on 12 November 2012. The album was recorded in Norfolk, and at McGinley's studio in Glasgow, and features guest appearances from Norman Blake, John McCusker, Dave McCluskey (of The Bluebells), and Peter Domberknowsky (of Giant Sand).

A follow-up album, The Making of You, was released in July 2020.

== Discography ==
- Harmony Springs (2012)
- The Making of You (2020)
- Descendant (2024)
