= My Patch =

2005 single by Jim Noir

Single by Jim Noir

from the album Tower of Love
- Released: 2005
- Genre: Indie pop, indie electronic, lo-fi
- Length: 3:08
- Label: My Dad Recordings
- Producer: Jim Noir

"My Patch" is a single by English singer-songwriter Jim Noir. Released as both an extended play and standalone single, it appears as the lead single off his debut album Tower of Love.

The song has been used several times in popular culture. It appears in the 2008 video game LittleBigPlanet.

Noir released a new version of the song with altered lyrics for a Target advertisement for Christmas 2007.

The instrumental opening is used as the theme tune for the BBC Radio 4 comedy show The Unbelievable Truth.

== Track listings ==
EP

1. "Computer Song"
2. "Turn Your Frown Into A Smile"
3. "My Patch"
4. "How To Be So Real"

== Charts ==
Chart (2006)	Peak position
UK Singles (Official Charts)	65
