= Jim Noir (album) =

Studio album by Jim Noir
- Released: April 8, 2008
- Genre: Indie pop, psychedelic pop, lo-fi
- Length: 44:17
- Label: My Dad Recordings (UK); Barsuk Records (U.S.)
- Producer: Jim Noir

Jim Noir chronology
Tower of Love (2005)	Jim Noir (2008)	Jimmy's Show (2012)

Jim Noir is the self-titled second album by Manchester based multi-instrumentalist Jim Noir. It was released on 8 April 2008.

== Album description ==
Interviewed by KCMP's Mary Lucia live from Austin, Texas music festival South by Southwest on 13 March 2008, Noir half-jokingly described the album as “another homegrown thing, made in my very own bedroom – 12, 13 delightful tracks made from my soul, not too plastic.“

== Track listing ==
Everything by Jim Noir.

No.	Title	Length
1.	"Welcome Commander Jameson"	1:00
2.	"All Right"	4:22
3.	"What U Gonna Do"	2:56
4.	"Don't You Worry"	3:30
5.	"Ships and Clouds"	3:05
6.	"Happy Day Today"	5:08
7.	"Look Around You"	3:55
8.	"Good Old Vinyl"	3:38
9.	"Same Place Holiday"	3:43
10.	"Day by Day by Day"	3:16
11.	"Welcome CJ"	2:37
12.	"On a Different Shelf"	5:33
13.	"Forever Endeavor"	1:34
Total length:		44:17

== Critical reception ==
Professional ratings
Aggregate scores
Source	Rating
Metacritic	80/100 (15 reviews)
Review scores
Source	Rating
AllMusic	4/5 stars
Drowned In Sound	7/10
Entertainment Weekly	(A−)
Gigwise	6/10 stars
The Guardian	3/5 stars
PopMatters	7/10 stars
Slant Magazine	4.5/5 stars

The album received very positive reviews from music critics. At Metacritic, which assigns a normalised rating out of 100 to reviews from mainstream critics, the album received an average score of 80, based on 15 reviews, which indicates "generally favorable reviews".

Entertainment Weekly‘s Michele Romero described the album as “endlessly uplifting” and praised it for its “instantly addictive compositions”. Praising the album's melodies and production, Slant Magazine’s Jonathan Keefe also found the album “endlessly enjoyable”.

AllMusic’s Tim Sendra found similar praise for the album, calling it “a second helping of a particularly good meal” and “a satisfying listening experience”. While seeing “no stand-out tracks”, he noted that “the overall quality of the record is so high and the sound is so perfect, you don't feel like there is something so terribly important missing”. Drowned In Sound’s Dom Gourlay thought that, “[w]hile a tad too long, with this record Jim Noir has shown that the British singer/songwriter can be eccentric and amusing rather than bland and workmanlike - hopefully it will earn its creator his fair share of recognition”.

Comparing the album to its predecessor, PopMatters’ Dan Raper called it “much more coherent and complete” as well as “much more mature, and (thereby) much more interesting”. However, he concluded that “Noir can still be goofy” at times, which is why his “music won’t appeal to everyone.” Similarly undecided, The Guardian’s Jude Rogers was critical about the album’s “retrofuturism”: “When this time-travelling works, it dazzles: […] But elsewhere, its perkiness wanes quickly, and the whiff of kitsch sits as awkwardly as a paisley space suit.”
