= The Heat Warps =

Studio album by Modern Nature
- Released: 29 August 2025
- Length: 41:40
- Label: Bella Union

Modern Nature chronology
No Fixed Point in Space (2023)	The Heat Warps (2025)

Singles from The Heat Warps
- 1. "Pharaoh" Released: 28 May 2025

The Heat Warps is the fourth studio album by English band Modern Nature, comprising vocalist Jack Cooper, drummer Jim Wallis, bass guitarist Jeff Tobias and guitarist Tara Cunningham. It was released on 29 August 2025 via Bella Union in LP, CD and digital formats. The album was preceded by the band's 2023 release, No Fixed Point in Space. "Pharaoh" was released as a single on 28 May 2025.

== Reception ==
Professional ratings
Review scores
Source	Rating
Narc	3.5/5 stars
PopMatters	8/10
Under the Radar	8/10 stars

Narc reviewer Matt Young assigned the album a rating of 3.5, stating "The record feels communal yet sharpened by personal conviction too; one with a more focused lyrical palette that reflects modern dread but uses a more measured optimism."

David Pike of PopMatters referred to it as "a fabulously compelling questioning album, and the questions it's asking are not the ones you expect to hear from a pop album," rating it eight.

Also rating it eight, Under the Radar's Mark Moody noted it as "excellent and on par with Modern Nature's best" and "something of a twist given its straightforward musical approach, but nonetheless even that presents itself as a change in direction."

== Track listing ==
The Heat Warps track listing
No.	Title	Length
1.	"Pharaoh"	4:52
2.	"Radio"	5:20
3.	"Glance"	4:15
4.	"Source"	6:54
5.	"Jetty"	1:50
6.	"Alpenglow"	3:45
7.	"Zoology"	4:30
8.	"Takeover"	4:03
9.	"Totality"	6:11
Total length:		41:40
