= Jimmy's Show =

Studio album by Jim Noir
- Released: September 17, 2012 (UK); October 1, 2012 (U.S.)
- Recorded: Manchester, England; 2008-2012
- Genres: Psychedelic pop, alternative, indie pop, lo-fi
- Label: Townsend Music (UK)
- Producer: Jim Noir

Jim Noir chronology
Jim Noir (2008)	Jimmy's Show (2012)	Finnish Line (2014)

Jimmy's Show is the third full-length album from Manchester, England based multi-instrumentalist Jim Noir. The album compiles tracks taken from his members-only Noir Club releases spanning between November 2010 and February 2012. The name is a reference to the Scottish comedy show Limmy's Show.

== Album description ==
According to AllMusic’s Tim Sendra, Jimmy’s Show is a “bubbly mixture of obscure British psych and bedroom pop, spiced with loopy lyrics and sticky sweet melodies” The Clash magazine's Simon Butcher described the album as “[p]layfully naïve Brian Wilson-inspired pop”, “entertaining the inner child with tongue-in-cheek lyrics and psychedelic funky pop.” The BBC’s Gary Mulholland called Jimmy’s Show “an album of perfect modern psychedelia, pristine in content but ramshackle in style, as at home with synths and drum machines as it is with acoustic guitars and martial Ringo drums, and packed full of sadness and dread and love for a ghostly choirboy harmony.”

== Sequel ==
Originally, Noir's sixth album Programmes for Cools, was set to be titled as Jimmy's Show 2 according to posts on Facebook by Noir. The album would be released on February 20, 2026.

== Track listing ==
Everything by Jim Noir.

No.	Title	Length
1.	"X Marks the Spot"	1:39
2.	"Tired Hairy Man With Parts"	3:17
3.	"Tea"	2:33
4.	"Sunny"	2:40
5.	"Ping Pong Time Tennis"	2:50
6.	"Driving My Escort Cosworth To the Cake Circus"	5:38
7.	"JJC Sports"	4:20
8.	"Cheese of Jim's Command"	5:17
9.	"Old Man Cyril"	2:43
10.	"Timepiece"	3:23
11.	"Praise For Your Mother"	3:39
12.	"Under the Tree"	3:17
13.	"Fishes and Dishes"	5:57
Total length:		47:13

== Critical reception ==
Professional ratings
Aggregate scores
Source	Rating
Metacritic	72/100
Review scores
Source	Rating
AllMusic	4/5 stars
AnyDecentMusic?	6.5/10
BBC	positive
Clash	7/10
God Is In The TV	3/5 stars
NME	6/10
The Line of Best Fit	6/10 stars
The Skinny	3/5 stars

Jimmy's Show was met with positive reviews by most critics. At Metacritic, which assigns a rating out of 100 to reviews from mainstream critics, the album has received an average score of 72, based on 7 reviews, indicating "generally favorable reviews".

AllMusic’s Tim Sendra wrote that while Jimmy's Show lacked “break-out singles”, “the tracks flow together seamlessly, delivering hook after hook until you can't help but smile at the sheer goofy poppiness of it all”. Describing the album as “weird music” that “should be instantly familiar to anyone with a working history of pop music of the last 40 years”, he concluded that "Jimmy's Show is yet more proof that Noir is a pop music magician.” In similar vein, the BBC’s Garry Mulholland called the album “a 13-track trip down The Beatles’ Penny Lane, blending the various song styles of Paul McCartney, Ray Davies, Brian Wilson and Gruff Rhys into a cute lo-fi celebration of a northern town on a sunny day” beneath which “misery and alienation lurks”. Apart from noting the album's influences, he especially praised “Noir’s almost offhand genius with melody”.

Despite criticising the song titles, stating they were “enough to inspire a shudder”, the NME’s Pete Cashmore praised the humour on Jimmy’s Show, calling it a “funny (peculiar) album filled with tinkles, tootles, swirls and noodles”.
