= The Unbelievable Truth (radio show) =

British comedy panel game (2007–)

- Genre: Panel game
- Running time: 28 minutes
- Country of origin: United Kingdom
- Language: English
- Home station: BBC Radio 4
- Hosted by: David Mitchell
- Created by: Graeme Garden; Jon Naismith
- Original release: 23 April 2007
- No. of series: 33 (plus 2 specials)
- Opening theme: "My Patch" by Jim Noir
- Website: BBC Homepage

The Unbelievable Truth is a BBC Radio 4 comedy panel game devised by Graeme Garden and Jon Naismith. The game is chaired by David Mitchell and is described in the programme's introduction as "the panel game built on truth and lies." The object of the game is for each panellist to deliver a short lecture about a given subject, which should be completely false save for five true statements which they must attempt to smuggle past the other players. The first series began broadcasting in 2007, and the 33rd series aired in April 2026.

== Reception ==
The Guardian's Elisabeth Mahoney reviewed the programme positively: "From the first moments of its plinky plonky theme tune, The Unbelievable Truth is a delight". (Note: The show's theme tune is an extract from "My Patch" by English singer-songwriter Jim Noir.) The Guardian's Zoe Williams, however, was critical of the programme, writing: "The Unbelievable Truth, for instance, should never have been recommissioned. It's only funny when Clive Anderson is speaking."

The BBC received "almost 50" complaints about insensitivity after David Mitchell opened a fourth series episode with the joke: "There is absolutely no truth in the rumour that the last line in Anne Frank's diary reads: 'Today is my birthday; dad bought me a drum kit'."

It won the "Best Radio Panel Show" award at the British Comedy Guide's 2011 and 2016 awards.

== Episodes ==
Winners are highlighted in bold.

=== Series 1 ===
| Episode | First broadcast | Guests | Subjects |
|---|---|---|---|
| Pilot | 19 October 2006 | Jeremy Hardy, Andy Hamilton, Neil Mullarkey, **Graeme Garden** | Hair, Football, Cats, Bees |
| 01x01 | 23 April 2007 | **Tony Hawks**, Frankie Boyle, Neil Mullarkey, Marcus Brigstocke | Cats, Michael Jackson, Beards, Coffee |
| 01x02 | 30 April 2007 | **Jeremy Hardy**, Alan Davies, Jo Brand, Clive Anderson | The Human Body, Coca-Cola, Morris Dancing, Carrots |
| 01x03 | 7 May 2007 | **Jeremy Hardy**, Alan Davies, Jo Brand, Clive Anderson | Chickens, London Underground, Queen Elizabeth I, Ancient Egyptians |
| 01x04 | 14 May 2007 | **Sandi Toksvig, Dara Ó Briain, Jo Caulfield, Graeme Garden** | George W Bush, Women, Ants, Olympic Games |
| 01x05 | 21 May 2007 | Tony Hawks, Frankie Boyle, **Neil Mullarkey**, **Marcus Brigstocke** | Bras, Hemp, Barcodes, Queen Elizabeth II |
| 01x06 | 28 May 2007 | **Sandi Toksvig**, Dara Ó Briain, Jo Caulfield, Graeme Garden | Denmark, Rats, Duke of Edinburgh, Trousers |

=== Series 2 ===
| Episode | First broadcast | Guests | Subjects |
|---|---|---|---|
| 02x01 | 5 May 2008 | **Phill Jupitus**, Alan Davies, **Simon Evans**, Tony Hawks | Bears, Beards, Queen Victoria, Tennis |
| 02x02 | 12 May 2008 | Michael McIntyre, Fred MacAulay, Graeme Garden, **Lucy Porter** | The Toilet, Cows, Sandwiches, Giraffes |
| 02x03 | 19 May 2008 | **Tim Vine**, **Adam Buxton**, Ed Byrne, Lee Mack | Hedgehogs, Hair, Kissing, Potatoes |
| 02x04 | 26 May 2008 | Tony Hawks, **Simon Evans**, Alan Davies, Phill Jupitus | Skateboards, William Shakespeare, Frogs, Bananas |
| 02x05 | 2 June 2008 | **Fred MacAulay, Graeme Garden, Lucy Porter**, Michael McIntyre | The Bed, Sweden, Leonardo da Vinci, Pigs |
| 02x06 | 9 June 2008 | Lee Mack, **Tim Vine**, **Ed Byrne**, Adam Buxton | Fleas, Napoleon Bonaparte, Left-Handedness, Marriage |

=== 2008 Christmas Special ===
| Episode | First broadcast | Guests | Subjects |
|---|---|---|---|
| Special | 15 December 2008 | Graeme Garden, Jack Dee, **Sean Lock**, Armando Iannucci | Christmas trees, Charles Dickens, Turkeys, Father Christmas |

=== Series 3 ===
| Episode | First broadcast | Guests | Subjects |
|---|---|---|---|
| 03x01 | 23 March 2009 | Graeme Garden, Chris Addison, Clive Anderson, **Lucy Porter** | Bicycles, Albert Einstein, Money, Penguins |
| 03x02 | 30 March 2009 | Tony Hawks, **Simon Evans**, Johnny Vaughan, Milton Jones | Dogs, Iceland, Football, Prince Charles |
| 03x03 | 6 April 2009 | Graeme Garden, **Chris Addison**, Lucy Porter, Clive Anderson | China, The Postal Service, Moustaches, The Moon |
| 03x04 | 13 April 2009 | Jack Dee, Fred MacAulay, **Will Self**, Jeremy Hardy | Smiling, Charles Darwin, Cucumbers, Dolphins |
| 03x05 | 20 April 2009 | Sue Perkins, **Arthur Smith**, Sean Lock, Miranda Hart | Henry VIII, Cockroaches, Dancing, Cricket |
| 03x06 | 27 April 2009 | Fred MacAulay, Jack Dee, **Will Self**, Jeremy Hardy | The Brain, Umbrellas, Alcohol, Cheese |

=== Series 4 ===
| Episode | First broadcast | Guests | Subjects |
|---|---|---|---|
| 04x01 | 5 October 2009 | **Rhod Gilbert**, **Reginald D. Hunter**, Shappi Khorsandi, Adam Hills | Golf, Cats, Tea, Adolf Hitler |
| 04x02 | 12 October 2009 | **Clive Anderson**, **Henning Wehn**, Fi Glover, Dom Joly | Baldness, Winston Churchill, Urine, Dwarves |
| 04x03 | 19 October 2009 | Tony Hawks, Arthur Smith, **Phill Jupitus**, **Graeme Garden** | Teeth, Underpants, The Vikings, Birmingham |
| 04x04 | 26 October 2009 | **Rhod Gilbert**, Reginald D. Hunter, Shappi Khorsandi, Adam Hills | Milk, Julius Caesar, Kissing, Kangaroos |
| 04x05 | 2 November 2009 | Clive Anderson, Henning Wehn, Fi Glover, **Dom Joly** | Tobacco, Sausages, Frogs, Elvis Presley |
| 04x06 | 9 November 2009 | Tony Hawks, Arthur Smith, **Phill Jupitus**, Graeme Garden | Ludwig van Beethoven, Wigs, Honey, The Telephone |

=== 2009 New Year's / QI Special ===
| Episode | First broadcast | Guests | Subjects |
|---|---|---|---|
| Sp. | 28 December 2009 | Rob Brydon, John Lloyd, **Stephen Fry**, Alan Davies | Snow, Tax, Champagne, Tigers |

=== Series 5 ===
| Episode | First broadcast | Guests | Subjects |
|---|---|---|---|
| 05x01 | 29 March 2010 | Marcus Brigstocke, Henning Wehn, **Lucy Porter**, Graeme Garden | Childbirth, Beer, Sleep, Sir Isaac Newton |
| 05x02 | 5 April 2010 | **Tony Hawks**, Arthur Smith, Catherine Tate, Phill Jupitus | Hats, Pigeons, Hairdressers, Admiral Horatio Nelson |
| 05x03 | 12 April 2010 | Fred MacAulay, **Susan Calman**, Liza Tarbuck, Charlie Brooker | Skiing, Cleopatra, Elephants, Chocolate |
| 05x04 | 19 April 2010 | **Marcus Brigstocke**, Henning Wehn, Lucy Porter, Graeme Garden | Soap, Pudding, Rabbits, Taxis |
| 05x05 | 26 April 2010 | Tony Hawks, Arthur Smith, **Catherine Tate**, Phill Jupitus | Ostriches, Toast, Red, Spectacles |
| 05x06 | 3 May 2010 | Fred MacAulay, Liza Tarbuck, Susan Calman, **Charlie Brooker** | Ducks, Wolfgang Amadeus Mozart, Make-up, Thomas Edison |

=== Series 6 ===
| Episode | First broadcast | Guests | Subjects |
|---|---|---|---|
| 06x01 | 27 September 2010 | Chris Addison, Susan Calman, **Rufus Hound**, Armando Iannucci | Henry Ford, Biscuits, Rain, Squirrels |
| 06x02 | 4 October 2010 | **Tony Hawks**, Henning Wehn, Graeme Garden, Arthur Smith | Nudity, Shoes, Walt Disney, Cakes |
| 06x03 | 11 October 2010 | Rhod Gilbert, **Tom Wrigglesworth**, Lucy Porter, Kevin Bridges | Spiders, Mushrooms, Eggs, Edinburgh |
| 06x04 | 18 October 2010 | **Chris Addison**, Susan Calman, Rufus Hound, Armando Iannucci | Clocks & Watches, Funerals, Goldfish, Joseph Stalin |
| 06x05 | 25 October 2010 | Tony Hawks, Henning Wehn, Arthur Smith, **Graeme Garden** | Noses, Apples, Lord Byron, Fishing |
| 06x06 | 1 November 2010 | Rhod Gilbert, **Tom Wrigglesworth**, **Kevin Bridges**, Lucy Porter | Bells, Mrs. Beeton, Donkeys, The Police |

=== Series 7 ===
| Episode | First broadcast | Guests | Subjects |
|---|---|---|---|
| 07x01 | 4 April 2011 | Marcus Brigstocke, Lucy Porter, **Alan Davies**, Jack Dee | Flies, Breasts, Enid Blyton, Curry |
| 07x02 | 11 April 2011 | Henning Wehn, Sue Perkins, Clive Anderson, **Graeme Garden** | Dogs, The Sun, Lewis Carroll, Lobsters |
| 07x03 | 18 April 2011 | **Tony Hawks**, Charlie Brooker, Arthur Smith, Rhod Gilbert | Mice, television, Sir Walter Raleigh, Soup |
| 07x04 | 25 April 2011 | Marcus Brigstocke, **Lucy Porter**, Alan Davies, Jack Dee | Dieting, Snakes, Eyes, Cutlery |
| 07x05 | 2 May 2011 | Clive Anderson, Henning Wehn, Sue Perkins, **Graeme Garden** | Sheep, Furniture, Ancient Greeks, Sir Arthur Conan Doyle |
| 07x06 | 9 May 2011 | Rhod Gilbert, **Arthur Smith**, Tony Hawks, Charlie Brooker | Badgers, Ears, Divorce, Ice Cream |

=== Series 8 ===
| Episode | First broadcast | Guests | Subjects |
|---|---|---|---|
| 08x01 | 26 December 2011 | Lee Mack, **Graeme Garden**, **Jack Dee**, Rufus Hound | Reindeer, Pantomime, Christmas decorations, Boxes |
| 08x02 | 2 January 2012 | Mark Watson, Henning Wehn, Ed Byrne, **Phill Jupitus** | The Olympics, Blood, Bees, Butter |
| 08x03 | 9 January 2012 | **Tony Hawks**, Tom Wrigglesworth, John Finnemore, Alan Davies | Hamburgers, Snoring, Crocodiles, Pens |
| 08x04 | 16 January 2012 | Jack Dee, Lee Mack, **Graeme Garden**, Rufus Hound | Boy Scouts, Nuts, Florence Nightingale, Circuses |
| 08x05 | 23 January 2012 | **Alex Horne**, Henning Wehn, Roisin Conaty, Mark Watson | The Romans, Chickens, Sweets & Confectionery, Competitions |
| 08x06 | 30 January 2012 | Tom Wrigglesworth, **John Finnemore**, Alan Davies, Tony Hawks | The Radio, Pasta, Flowers, Wool |

=== Series 9 ===
| Episode | First broadcast | Guests | Subjects |
|---|---|---|---|
| 09x01 | 2 April 2012 | Tony Hawks, **Lucy Porter**, Graeme Garden, Arthur Smith | Parrots, Breakfast, Insurance, Oliver Cromwell |
| 09x02 | 9 April 2012 | Tom Wrigglesworth, Henning Wehn, Danielle Ward, **John Finnemore** | Smoking, Football, China, Pandas |
| 09x03 | 16 April 2012 | Marcus Brigstocke, Miles Jupp, **Susan Calman**, Alan Davies | Swimming, Bread, Hotels, Foxes |
| 09x04 | 23 April 2012 | Arthur Smith, Tony Hawks, **Lucy Porter**, Graeme Garden | Barbie, Restaurants, Feet, Garlic |
| 09x05 | 30 April 2012 | Danielle Ward, Henning Wehn, John Finnemore, **Tom Wrigglesworth** | Bats, Cars, Dr. Johnson, Oranges |
| 09x06 | 7 May 2012 | Miles Jupp, **Susan Calman**, Marcus Brigstocke, Alan Davies | Goats, Singing, Glue, Painting |

=== Series 10 ===
| Episode | First broadcast | Guests | Subjects |
|---|---|---|---|
| 10x01 | 31 December 2012 | Tony Hawks, **Lucy Porter**, Ed Byrne, Charlie Higson | Pies, Dancing, Worms, James Bond |
| 10x02 | 7 January 2013 | Lloyd Langford, Henning Wehn, Celia Pacquola, **Rhod Gilbert** | Wine, Queen Elizabeth II, Bathtubs, Wind |
| 10x03 | 14 January 2013 | **John Finnemore**, Henning Wehn, Holly Walsh, Arthur Smith | Boris Johnson, Computers, Oscar Wilde, Wasps |
| 10x04 | 21 January 2013 | Tony Hawks, Lucy Porter, Ed Byrne, **Charlie Higson** | Gambling, Teeth, Tortoises & Turtles, Lemons |
| 10x05 | 28 January 2013 | Lloyd Langford, Celia Pacquola, Phill Jupitus, **Marcus Brigstocke** | Tomatoes, Koalas, Boats, Cheese |
| 10x06 | 4 February 2013 | Arthur Smith, Henning Wehn, **Holly Walsh**, John Finnemore | Simon Cowell, Beards, Camels, Germany |

=== Series 11 ===
| Episode | First broadcast | Guests | Subjects |
|---|---|---|---|
| 11x01 | 8 April 2013 | **Lloyd Langford**, Henning Wehn, Katherine Ryan, **Graeme Garden** | Sharks, Photography, Sugar, Jeremy Clarkson |
| 11x02 | 15 April 2013 | Rhod Gilbert, Richard Osman, Lucy Beaumont, **John Finnemore** | Moles, Cabbages, Trains, BBC |
| 11x03 | 22 April 2013 | Tony Hawks, **Lucy Porter**, **Mark Watson**, Ed Byrne | Monkeys, Fingers, Windows, Horns |
| 11x04 | 29 April 2013 | Henning Wehn, **Katherine Ryan**, Graeme Garden, Lloyd Langford | Geese, Horses, Advertising, Madonna |
| 11x05 | 6 May 2013 | Richard Osman, **John Finnemore**, Lucy Beaumont, Rhod Gilbert | Octopuses, Aeroplanes, Armadillos, Socks |
| 11x06 | 13 May 2013 | Ed Byrne, Mark Watson, **Lucy Porter**, Tony Hawks | The French, Lions, Grass, Pianos |

=== Series 12 ===
| Episode | First broadcast | Guests | Subjects |
|---|---|---|---|
| 12x01 | 30 December 2013 | **Arthur Smith**, Henning Wehn, Bridget Christie, **Ed Byrne** | Poison, Etiquette, Jelly, David Mitchell |
| 12x02 | 6 January 2014 | Marcus Brigstocke, Holly Walsh, **John Finnemore**, Rufus Hound | Eton, Babies, Russia, Hats |
| 12x03 | 13 January 2014 | **Henning Wehn**, Victoria Coren Mitchell, **Graeme Garden**, Jeremy Hardy | Trees, Spain, Doctors, Newspapers |
| 12x04 | 20 January 2014 | Lloyd Langford, **Lucy Porter**, Tom Wrigglesworth, Fred MacAulay | Women, Japan, Owls, Potatoes |
| 12x05 | 27 January 2014 | Marcus Brigstocke, **Holly Walsh**, John Finnemore, **Rufus Hound** | Board games, Salt, Guinea pigs, Actors |
| 12x06 | 3 February 2014 | **Jeremy Hardy**, Graeme Garden, Victoria Coren Mitchell, Henning Wehn | The Clergy, Beetles, Novels, The British |

=== Series 13 ===
| Episode | First broadcast | Guests | Subjects |
|---|---|---|---|
| 13x01 | 7 April 2014 | Alex Horne, Lucy Beaumont, John Finnemore, **Jack Dee** | Birds, Witches, Pubs, Shoes |
| 13x02 | 14 April 2014 | **Lloyd Langford**, Katherine Ryan, Jon Richardson, Graeme Garden | Whales, Canada, Pigs, Buses |
| 13x03 | 21 April 2014 | Alex Horne, Lucy Beaumont, **John Finnemore**, Jack Dee | Legs, The Internet, Dogs, The Middle Ages |
| 13x04 | 28 April 2014 | Lloyd Langford, Katherine Ryan, Jon Richardson, **Graeme Garden** | Wales, The Mouth, Fish, Perfume |
| 13x05 | 5 May 2014 | Tony Hawks, **Susan Calman**, Phill Jupitus, Miles Jupp | The Brain, The Victorians, Toads, Cooking |
| 13x06 | 12 May 2014 | Tony Hawks, Susan Calman, **Phill Jupitus**, Miles Jupp | School, Bears, Underwear, Bottles |

=== Series 14 ===
| Episode | First broadcast | Guests | Subjects |
|---|---|---|---|
| 14x01 | 29 December 2014 | Lloyd Langford, **David O'Doherty**, Susan Calman, Josh Widdicombe | Penguins, Spoons, Dolls, Letters |
| 14x02 | 5 January 2015 | **Ed Byrne**, Henning Wehn, Holly Walsh, **Richard Osman** | Ireland, Rules, London, Beavers |
| 14x03 | 12 January 2015 | Arthur Smith, Sarah Millican, Sandi Toksvig, **Graeme Garden** | Death, Balloons, Farming, Jane Austen |
| 14x04 | 19 January 2015 | Ed Byrne, **Holly Walsh**, Richard Osman, Henning Wehn | Ancient Egypt, Ice, Rubbish, British food |
| 14x05 | 26 January 2015 | Lloyd Langford, **Josh Widdicombe**, Susan Calman, David O'Doherty | Fakes, Holes, Cats, Marie Antoinette |
| 14x06 | 2 February 2015 | Arthur Smith, **Sarah Millican**, Sandi Toksvig, Graeme Garden | Fat, Smells, Shopping, Gardens |

=== Series 15 ===
| Episode | First broadcast | Guests | Subjects |
|---|---|---|---|
| 15x01 | 24 August 2015 | **Lloyd Langford**, Henning Wehn, **Sara Pascoe**, Miles Jupp | Magic, Austria, Swans, Onions |
| 15x02 | 31 August 2015 | Arthur Smith, Jon Richardson, **Susan Calman**, David O'Doherty | Pets, Bacteria, Zombies, Water |
| 15x03 | 7 September 2015 | **Lloyd Langford**, Henning Wehn, Sara Pascoe, Miles Jupp | Zoos, Theft, Phones, Hands |
| 15x04 | 14 September 2015 | **Victoria Coren Mitchell**, Holly Walsh, Katherine Ryan, Sarah Millican | Princesses, Diets, Sauces, Paper |
| 15x05 | 21 September 2015 | Arthur Smith, **Jon Richardson**, **Susan Calman**, David O'Doherty | Yorkshire, Soft drinks, Skin, Pirates |
| 15x06 | 28 September 2015 | Holly Walsh, Katherine Ryan, **Victoria Coren Mitchell**, **Sarah Millican** | IKEA, Marriage, Switzerland, Chewing gum |

=== Series 16 ===
| Episode | First broadcast | Guests | Subjects |
|---|---|---|---|
| 16x01 | 4 April 2016 | Jon Richardson, Henning Wehn, **Susan Calman**, Jack Dee | Milk, Tattoos, Supermarkets, Vladimir Putin |
| 16x02 | 11 April 2016 | Joe Lycett, Sam Simmons, Aisling Bea, **Richard Osman** | Kitchens, Pigeons, Breakfast cereal, The Vatican |
| 16x03 | 18 April 2016 | Elis James, **Maeve Higgins**, Reginald D. Hunter, David O'Doherty | The 1970s, The Moon, Toys, Electricity |
| 16x04 | 25 April 2016 | **Joe Lycett**, Sam Simmons, Aisling Bea, Richard Osman | Jokes, Ghosts, Reality TV, Lego |
| 16x05 | 2 May 2016 | Jon Richardson, Henning Wehn, **Susan Calman**, Jack Dee | Funerals, British aristocracy, Nudity, Rubber |
| 16x06 | 9 May 2016 | Elis James, Maeve Higgins, **Reginald D. Hunter**, David O'Doherty | Gifts, Fashion, Women, Songs |

=== Series 17 ===
| Episode | First broadcast | Guests | Subjects |
|---|---|---|---|
| 17x01 | 3 October 2016 | Holly Walsh, Lloyd Langford, **Rich Hall**, Henning Wehn | Mosquitoes, Flags, Roads, North Korea |
| 17x02 | 10 October 2016 | **Holly Walsh**, Henning Wehn, Rich Hall, Lloyd Langford | Tom Cruise, Basketball, Wood, McDonald's |
| 17x03 | 17 October 2016 | Tony Hawks, **Vicki Pepperdine**, **Clive Anderson**, Richard Osman | Chairs, Medicine, Prisons, Video games |
| 17x04 | 24 October 2016 | Tony Hawks, Vicki Pepperdine, **Clive Anderson**, **Richard Osman** | Australia, Leather, Oil, Crisps |
| 17x05 | 31 October 2016 | **John Finnemore**, Jeremy Hardy, Lucy Porter, Frankie Boyle | Donald Trump, Musicals, Weddings, Oxbridge |
| 17x06 | 7 November 2016 | **John Finnemore**, Jeremy Hardy, Lucy Porter, Frankie Boyle | Spies, Fire, Norfolk, The Beatles |

=== Series 18 ===
| Episode | First broadcast | Guests | Subjects |
|---|---|---|---|
| 18x01 | 3 April 2017 | **John Finnemore**, Henning Wehn, Lou Sanders, Miles Jupp | Sheep, Islands, Steve Jobs, Beans |
| 18x02 | 10 April 2017 | **John Finnemore**, Henning Wehn, Lou Sanders, Miles Jupp | Names, Germany, Secrets, Nudity |
| 18x03 | 17 April 2017 | David O'Doherty, Marcus Brigstocke, Zoe Lyons, **Richard Osman** | Bicycles, Wine, Trees, Chocolate |
| 18x04 | 24 April 2017 | David O'Doherty, **Marcus Brigstocke**, Zoe Lyons, Richard Osman | Colour, Vegetables, Pizzas, Carpets |
| 18x05 | 1 May 2017 | Holly Walsh, Mark Steel, Elis James, **Frankie Boyle** | Ducks, Oliver Cromwell, Words, Astronauts |
| 18x06 | 8 May 2017 | **Holly Walsh**, Mark Steel, Elis James, Frankie Boyle | Delia Smith, Robots, Rain, Facebook |

=== Series 19 ===
| Episode | First broadcast | Guests | Subjects |
|---|---|---|---|
| 19x01 | 2 October 2017 | Arthur Smith, Lou Sanders, Phil Wang, **Richard Osman** | Cows, Arnold Schwarzenegger, Students, Dolphins |
| 19x02 | 9 October 2017 | Arthur Smith, Lou Sanders, **Phil Wang**, Richard Osman | Sugar, Chickens, Aeroplanes, Kanye West |
| 19x03 | 16 October 2017 | Lloyd Langford, Henning Wehn, **Ellie Taylor**, John Finnemore | Dinosaurs, People's Republic of China, Cake, Bees |
| 19x04 | 23 October 2017 | Lloyd Langford, Henning Wehn, **Ellie Taylor**, John Finnemore | Boxing, Snails, Bras, Parents |
| 19x05 | 30 October 2017 | Tony Hawks, Holly Walsh, Mark Steel, **Fred MacAulay** | Twins, Sean Connery, Golf, Photography |
| 19x06 | 6 November 2017 | Tony Hawks, **Holly Walsh**, Mark Steel, Fred MacAulay | Doughnuts, Jellyfish, Twitter, Star Wars |

=== Series 20 ===
| Episode | First broadcast | Guests | Subjects |
|---|---|---|---|
| 20x01 | 2 April 2018 | **John Finnemore**, Henning Wehn, Lou Sanders, Graeme Garden | The Police, Submarines, Books, Spiders |
| 20x02 | 9 April 2018 | **Richard Osman**, Elis James, Sindhu Vee, Alan Davies | Google, Rugby, Bananas, Crabs |
| 20x03 | 16 April 2018 | Arthur Smith, Jack Dee, **Lucy Porter**, Lloyd Langford | Rabbits, Inventions, Butterflies, Drugs |
| 20x04 | 23 April 2018 | **John Finnemore**, Henning Wehn, Lou Sanders, Graeme Garden | The Rolling Stones, Vegetarianism, Eggs, Harry Potter |
| 20x05 | 30 April 2018 | **Richard Osman**, Elis James, Sindhu Vee, Alan Davies | Buses, Dancing, Monkeys, Statues |
| 20x06 | 7 May 2018 | Arthur Smith, Jack Dee, Lucy Porter, **Lloyd Langford** | Walking, NASA, Soap operas, Poets |

=== Series 21 ===
| Episode | First broadcast | Guests | Subjects |
|---|---|---|---|
| 21x01 | 24 December 2018 | Sandi Toksvig, **Jon Richardson**, Lucy Porter, Graeme Garden | Denmark, Hair, Smells, Fish |
| 21x02 | 31 December 2018 | Richard Osman, Holly Walsh, **Susan Calman**, David O'Doherty | Sleep, Mobile Phones, Stealing, Pets |
| 21x03 | 7 January 2019 | Sandi Toksvig, Jon Richardson, **Lucy Porter**, Graeme Garden | Drunkenness, Passports, Orange, The Weather |
| 21x04 | 14 January 2019 | Henning Wehn, Lou Sanders, Zoe Lyons, **Lloyd Langford** | Holidays, Queens, Teeth, Ants |
| 21x05 | 21 January 2019 | **Richard Osman**, Holly Walsh, Susan Calman, David O'Doherty | Nuts, Birds, Urine, Traditions |
| 21x06 | 28 January 2019 | **Henning Wehn**, Lou Sanders, Zoe Lyons, Lloyd Langford | Houses of Parliament, Wolves, Trains, Punishments |

=== Series 22 ===
| Episode | First broadcast | Guests | Subjects |
|---|---|---|---|
| 22x01 | 1 April 2019 | **Richard Osman**, Holly Walsh, Luisa Omielan, Jack Dee | Mice, Las Vegas, Beyoncé, Rubbish |
| 22x02 | 8 April 2019 | Tony Hawks, Sindhu Vee, Susan Calman, **Graeme Garden** | Swimming, Mothers, Magazines, Clowns |
| 22x03 | 15 April 2019 | Henning Wehn, **Lucy Porter**, **Lou Sanders**, Frankie Boyle | Germany, Babies, Trousers, Beards |
| 22x04 | 22 April 2019 | **Richard Osman**, Holly Walsh, Luisa Omielan, Jack Dee | Names, Frogs, Paper, Parrots |
| 22x05 | 29 April 2019 | Tony Hawks, Sindhu Vee, **Susan Calman**, Graeme Garden | Kings, Snakes, Make Up, Hats |
| 22x06 | 6 May 2019 | Henning Wehn, Lucy Porter, Lou Sanders, **Frankie Boyle** | Time, Driving, The Spice Girls, Scotland |

=== Series 23 ===
| Episode | First broadcast | Guests | Subjects |
|---|---|---|---|
| 23x01 | 30 December 2019 | Tony Hawks, Holly Walsh, Henning Wehn, **Sally Phillips** | Dogs, Actors, Rules, Finland |
| 23x02 | 6 January 2020 | Sindhu Vee, **Lloyd Langford**, Susan Calman, **Graeme Garden** | Flowers, Rappers, Cheese, Winston Churchill |
| 23x03 | 13 January 2020 | **Neil Delamere**, Cally Beaton, Lou Sanders, **Marcus Brigstocke** | Rats, The Netherlands, Human body, Chocolate |
| 23x04 | 20 January 2020 | Tony Hawks, **Holly Walsh**, Henning Wehn, Sally Phillips | Words, Elvis Presley, Education, Ferrets |
| 23x05 | 27 January 2020 | **Sindhu Vee**, Lloyd Langford, Susan Calman, **Graeme Garden** | Names, Bob Dylan, Superheroes, Meat |
| 23x06 | 3 February 2020 | **Neil Delamere**, Cally Beaton, Lou Sanders, Marcus Brigstocke | Vikings, Language, Kissing, Religion |

=== Series 24 ===
Series 24 was recorded during the COVID-19 lockdown, with each panelist performing at home.

| Episode | First broadcast | Guests | Subjects |
|---|---|---|---|
| 24x01 | 15 June 2020 | **Holly Walsh**, **Miles Jupp**, Sara Pascoe, Frankie Boyle | Musical Instruments, Recipes, Pets, Women |
| 24x02 | 22 June 2020 | Lucy Porter, Sean Lock, **Zoe Lyons**, Jack Dee | Country and Western Music, Jobs, Sharks, The 1970s |
| 24x03 | 29 June 2020 | **Henning Wehn**, Lou Sanders, Sindhu Vee, Neil Delamere | Furniture, Birthdays, Phobias, Rocks |
| 24x04 | 6 July 2020 | Holly Walsh, **Miles Jupp**, Sara Pascoe, Frankie Boyle | Bread, ABBA, Men, Experiments |
| 24x05 | 13 July 2020 | Henning Wehn, Lou Sanders, Sindhu Vee, **Neil Delamere** | Guns, Magic, Berries, Crocodiles |
| 24x06 | 20 July 2020 | **Lucy Porter, Sean Lock**, Zoe Lyons, Jack Dee | Poison, Heavy Metal, Painters, Winter Sports |

=== Series 25 ===
Series 25 was also recorded with the panellists performing from home during lockdown. Two episodes featured three teams of two rather than four panellists playing individually (all three teams consisted of married couples).

| Episode | First broadcast | Guests | Subjects |
|---|---|---|---|
| 25x01 | 11 January 2021 | Frankie Boyle, Miles Jupp, Sara Pascoe, **Holly Walsh** | London, Names, Divorce, Bats |
| 25x02 | 18 January 2021 | Henning Wehn, Sindhu Vee, **Zoe Lyons**, Lloyd Langford | Eurovision, Vegetarians, Squid, Bananas |
| 25x03 | 25 January 2021 | **Marcus Brigstocke and Rachel Parris**, Gary Delaney and Sarah Millican, Justin Edwards and Lucy Porter | Marriage, Rabbits, Crisps |
| 25x04 | 1 February 2021 | **Holly Walsh**, **Miles Jupp**, Sara Pascoe, Frankie Boyle | Puppets, Spying, Religion, Glasgow |
| 25x05 | 8 February 2021 | Henning Wehn, **Sindhu Vee**, Zoe Lyons, Lloyd Langford | Ghosts, Goats, Fighting, Sound |
| 25x06 | 15 February 2021 | Rachel Parris and Marcus Brigstocke, Sarah Millican and Gary Delaney, **Lucy Porter and Justin Edwards** | Horses, Valentine's Day, Nudity |

=== Series 26 ===
| Episode | First broadcast | Guests | Subjects |
|---|---|---|---|
| 26x01 | 26 July 2021 | Holly Walsh, **Henning Wehn**, Zoe Lyons, Richard Osman | Ancient Romans, Tea, Crustaceans, Balls |
| 26x02 | 2 August 2021 | **Tony Hawks**, Fern Brady, Ria Lina, Rufus Hound | Snails, Wives, Germs, Biscuits |
| 26x03 | 9 August 2021 | Lucy Porter, **Frankie Boyle**, Sally Phillips, **Neil Delamere** | Dolls, Laughter, Tennis, Philosophers |
| 26x04 | 16 August 2021 | Holly Walsh, Henning Wehn, Zoe Lyons, **Richard Osman** | Insects, Words, Parties, Supermarkets |
| 26x05 | 23 August 2021 | Rufus Hound, Fern Brady, **Ria Lina**, Tony Hawks | Mushrooms, Milk, Monkeys, Children |
| 26x06 | 30 August 2021 | Lucy Porter, **Neil Delamere**, Sally Phillips, Frankie Boyle | Singing, Shopping, Moths, Football |

=== Series 27 ===
| Episode | First broadcast | Guests | Subjects |
|---|---|---|---|
| 27x01 | 10 January 2022 | **Alan Davies**, **Lucy Porter**, Lou Sanders, **Justin Edwards** | Pigs, Underwear, Camels, Sausages |
| 27x02 | 17 January 2022 | Pippa Evans, Geoff Norcott, **Fern Brady**, Simon Evans | Shoes, Beer, Diets, Metal |
| 27x03 | 24 January 2022 | Alan Davies, **Lucy Porter**, Lou Sanders, **Justin Edwards** | Jackie Chan, Blood, Marsupials, Beds |
| 27x04 | 31 January 2022 | Richard Osman, Henning Wehn, **Holly Walsh**, Ria Lina | Mistakes, Bicycles, Dogs, Death |
| 27x05 | 7 February 2022 | Pippa Evans, Geoff Norcott, Fern Brady, **Simon Evans** | Cars, Coca-Cola, Donkeys, Tomatoes |
| 27x06 | 14 February 2022 | Richard Osman, **Henning Wehn**, Holly Walsh, Ria Lina | Glasses, Squirrels, Alexander the Great, China |

=== Series 28 ===
| Episode | First broadcast | Guests | Subjects |
|---|---|---|---|
| 28x01 | 4 April 2022 | **Alan Davies**, Lucy Porter, Holly Walsh, Tony Hawks | Advertising, Essex, Candles, Water |
| 28x02 | 11 April 2022 | **Henning Wehn**, Zoe Lyons, Sindhu Vee, Marcus Brigstocke | Windows, Ants, Rice, Ancient Egyptians |
| 28x03 | 18 April 2022 | Lou Sanders, Ria Lina, Milton Jones, **Chris McCausland** | Magazines, The Human Body, Golf, Computers |
| 28x04 | 25 April 2022 | Lucy Porter, **Holly Walsh**, Tony Hawks, Alan Davies | Scouting, Hair, South Korea, Nicolas Cage |
| 28x05 | 2 May 2022 | Henning Wehn, Zoe Lyons, Sindhu Vee, **Marcus Brigstocke** | Colours, Ice Cream, Apples, Alcoholic Spirits |
| 28x06 | 9 May 2022 | **Lou Sanders**, Ria Lina, **Milton Jones**, **Chris McCausland** | Flowers, Wood, Underground, Goldfish |

=== Series 29 ===
| Episode | First broadcast | Guests | Subjects |
|---|---|---|---|
| 29x01 | 29 May 2023 | Henning Wehn, Angela Barnes, **Holly Walsh**, **Alan Davies** | Cleaning, Airports, New Zealand, Horses |
| 29x02 | 5 June 2023 | Phil Wang, **Kerry Godliman**, Lou Sanders, Neil Delamere | Tea, Dancing, Beauty, Giraffes |
| 29x03 | 12 June 2023 | **Angela Barnes**, Henning Wehn, Holly Walsh, Alan Davies | Languages, Maps, The postal service, Pubs |
| 29x04 | 19 June 2023 | **Marcus Brigstocke**, Lucy Porter, Ria Lina, Richard Osman | Bans, French, Superstition, Hippos |
| 29x05 | 26 June 2023 | **Phil Wang**, Kerry Godliman, Lou Sanders, **Neil Delamere** | Chefs, Pipes, Accidents, The Greeks |
| 29x06 | 3 July 2023 | Marcus Brigstocke, Lucy Porter, Ria Lina, **Richard Osman** | Insurance, Popes, Surgery, Norway |

=== 2024 Seasonal Special ===
| Episode | First broadcast | Guests | Subjects |
|---|---|---|---|
| Seasonal Trimmings | 1 January 2024 | Graeme Garden, Armando Iannucci, Sean Lock, Richard Osman, Holly Walsh, Susan Calman, David O'Doherty, Rob Brydon, Alan Davies, Stephen Fry, Fern Brady, Geoff Norcott, Simon Evans, Jack Dee, John Lloyd, Lee Mack, Rufus Hound | Christmas trees, Nuts, Snow, Donkeys, Santa Claus, Champagne, Reindeer, Boxes, Turkey |

=== Series 30 ===
| Episode | First broadcast | Guests | Subjects |
|---|---|---|---|
| 30x01 | 5 August 2024 | Justin Edwards, Zoe Lyons, Lucy Porter, **Tony Hawks** | Coffee, Mexicans, Lying, Divorce |
| 30x02 | 12 August 2024 | Angela Barnes, Glenn Moore, Shaparak Khorsandi, **Neil Delamere** | Legs, Restaurants, Travel, Tigers |
| 30x03 | 19 August 2024 | Miles Jupp, Holly Walsh, **Lou Sanders**, Marcus Brigstocke | Milk, Italians, Parties, Sound |
| 30x04 | 26 August 2024 | Justin Edwards, Zoe Lyons, **Lucy Porter**, Tony Hawks | Stationery, Fast food, The Tudors, Swearing |
| 30x05 | 2 September 2024 | **Angela Barnes**, Glenn Moore, Shaparak Khorsandi, Neil Delamere | Websites, Cartoons, Prince Harry, Teeth |
| 30x06 | 9 September 2024 | Miles Jupp, **Holly Walsh**, Lou Sanders, Marcus Brigstocke | Fungi, the Beckhams, Cushions, Puddings |

=== Series 31 ===
| Episode | First broadcast | Guests | Subjects |
|---|---|---|---|
| 31x01 | 14 April 2025 | **Marcus Brigstocke**, Holly Walsh, Lou Sanders, Tony Hawks | The Middle Ages, Geese, The Human Voice, Children's TV |
| 31x02 | 21 April 2025 | **Lucy Porter**, Ian Smith, Zoe Lyons, Henning Wehn | Potatoes, Yorkshire, Wine, Beaches |
| 31x03 | 28 April 2025 | **Angela Barnes**, Mark Steel, Ria Lina, Alan Davies | Spies, Bread, Numbers, Names |
| 31x04 | 5 May 2025 | Marcus Brigstocke, **Holly Walsh**, Lou Sanders, Tony Hawks | Legs, Cheese, New York, Guitars |
| 31x05 | 12 May 2025 | Lucy Porter, **Ian Smith**, Zoe Lyons, Henning Wehn | Weddings, Teeth, Shoes, Board games |
| 31x06 | 19 May 2025 | Angela Barnes, Mark Steel, **Ria Lina**, Alan Davies | Wheels, Cows, Condiments, Toys |

=== Series 32 ===
| Episode | First broadcast | Guests | Subjects |
|---|---|---|---|
| 32x01 | 22 December 2025 | Ed Byrne, Ian Smith, Maisie Adam, **Lucy Porter** | Pigeons, Smoking, Football, Night |
| 32x02 | 29 December 2025 | **Holly Walsh**, Henning Wehn, Tony Hawks, Zoe Lyons | Jane Austen, Berries, The Netherlands, School |
| 32x03 | 5 January 2026 | **Frankie Boyle**, Miles Jupp, Michelle Wolf, Celya AB | Time, Paris, Bees, Dictators |
| 32x04 | 12 January 2026 | Ian Smith, **Lucy Porter**, Maisie Adam, Ed Byrne | Names, Rodents, Death, Chocolate |
| 32x05 | 19 January 2026 | Holly Walsh, **Henning Wehn**, Tony Hawks, Zoe Lyons | Sugar, Saints, Spiders and Heavy Metal |
| 32x06 | 26 January 2026 | **Frankie Boyle**, Miles Jupp, Michelle Wolf, Celya AB | Men, Statues, Theft and Martial Arts |

=== Series 33 ===
| Episode | First broadcast | Guests | Subjects |
|---|---|---|---|
| 33x01 | 27 April 2026 | Henning Wehn, **Holly Walsh**, Miles Jupp, Lucy Porter | Hats, Drugs, Germany, The BBC |
| 33x02 | 4 May 2026 | Alan Davies, Celya AB, **Ian Smith**, Angela Barnes | Pets, The Brain, Breakfast, Shopping |
| 33x03 | 11 May 2026 | Tony Hawks, **Zoe Lyons**, Mark Steel, **Fern Brady** | Words, Bears, The French and Mushrooms |
| 33x04 | 18 May 2026 | Henning Wehn, Holly Walsh, **Miles Jupp**, Lucy Porter | Advertising, The Beatles, Theatre and Underwear |
| 33x05 | 25 May 2026 | **Alan Davies**, Celya AB, Ian Smith, Angela Barnes | Punishments, Comedy, Hotels and Cars |
| 33x06 | 1 June 2026 | Tony Hawks, Zoe Lyons, Mark Steel, **Fern Brady** | Sausages, Fish, Table Tennis and Butterflies |

== International versions ==
Members from the Australian comedy group The Chaser, including Craig Reucassel, Andrew Hansen and Julian Morrow, have produced a TV series based on the British series.
