= Tower of Love (album) =

Studio album by Jim Noir
- Released: December 12, 2005 (UK); June 21, 2006 (JPN); August 8, 2006 (U.S.)
- Recorded: Manchester, England; 2004-2005
- Genre: Indie pop, indie electronic, lo-fi
- Length: 45:35
- Label: My Dad Recordings (UK); Barsuk Records (U.S.)
- Producer: Jim Noir

Jim Noir chronology
Tower of Love (2005)	Jim Noir (2008)

Tower of Love is the debut album by Manchester based multi-instrumentalist Jim Noir. First released on 12 December 2005, it largely consists of songs taken from Noir's first three releases, Eanie Meany EP, My Patch EP and A Quiet Man EP.

== Album description ==
AllMusic’s Tim Sendra described the album as a "blending of the cheesy drum machines and bubbling synths of indie electronic, the lo-fi guitars and adult-child vocals of indie pop, and the full-bodied and harmony-drenched arrangements of chamber pop into a swirling, soothing, and truly lovely Technicolor pop confection".

== Album cover art ==
The album cover art features a lighthouse, emitting heart symbols instead of light. There appear to be two versions of the album cover, one with a door in the lighthouse and one without a door.

== Critical reception ==
Professional ratings
Aggregate scores
Source	Rating
Metacritic	73/100 (18 reviews)
Review scores
Source	Rating
AllMusic	4.5/5 stars
Drowned In Sound	(7/10)
Gigwise	7/10 stars
The Guardian	4/5 stars
Pitchfork Media	(7.2/10)
PopMatters	(6/10)
The A.V. Club	(B+)

The album received by and large positive reviews from music critics. At Metacritic, which assigns a normalised rating out of 100 to reviews from mainstream critics, the album has an average score of 73 out of 100, which indicates "generally favorable reviews" based on 18 reviews.

Calling Noir a “melodic genius”, The Guardian‘s Dave Simpson described the album as “a cross between a classic 1960s album and half-forgotten children's TV themes”, “rich in the sort of melodies you'd think went out with Simon and Garfunkel and Smile-era Beach Boys.” In similar vein, PopMatters’ Dan Raper described the album as “sophisticated pop music with broad appeal” that “hums with 60s pop brilliantine and a slightly uncomfortable childhood nostalgia”. Speaking about notable influences on the album, Raper wrote that “Jim Noir casually allows the history of pop music to inform his arrangements; luckily, he never allows them to overwhelm his natural sense of melody. Somehow, these sweet songs still sound fresh.” He further praised the album for retaining “a sunny optimism that’s difficult to resist. For that reason alone Tower of Love is worth a listen.” In his review, Allmusic’s Tim Sendra especially noted the album’s “catchy and richly constructed tunes”, predicting that listeners “will be hard-pressed to keep from walking around all day grinning like a fish once you give the album an airing. In fact, doctors should prescribe a spin of Tower of Love to chase the blues away. The only problem with the record is that it paints Noir into a corner, as it will be hard to top.” In his review, Drowned In Sound’s Dom Gourlay concluded that “[a]lthough not strictly an album in that it wasn't created for the purpose of such [...], it still wipes the floor with most other albums of a similar genre released this, or indeed any other year in the last ten. [...] Tower Of Love is a tasty entree that merely whets the appetite for the first album proper.”

While praising its melodies, Pitchfork Media’s Sam Ubl criticised the album’s “subject matter” and Noir's “trying to emphasize the naïvety of his naïve-sounding music with naïve content": "Let's just say Tower of Love isn't out to offend or challenge or discomfit anyone.”

== Media appearances ==
- For the 2007 holiday season, Target featured a commercial in which an adaptation of Noir's song "My Patch" is playing while windows in a large Advent calendar open and close. The original lyrics, "If you ever step on my patch / I'll bring you down, I'll bring you down" were modified. In the commercial, a different singer sings "Holidays are times of magic / We're counting down, we're counting down".
- "My Patch" was used in a trailer for the PlayStation 3 video game LittleBigPlanet, which was shown at the E3 games conference, and the song also appears in the full game. The song is also used as the theme tune to the BBC radio comedy panel game The Unbelievable Truth.
- In 2006, Adidas used a remix of "Eanie Meany" for their World Cup themed advert Josè +10, featuring the lyric "If you don't give my football back, I'm gonna get my dad on you" throughout.

== Track listing ==
Everything by Jim Noir.

UK release
No.	Title	Length
1.	"My Patch"	4:05
2.	"I Me You I'm Your"	2:40
3.	"Computer Song"	2:56
4.	"How to Be So Real"	4:52
5.	"Eanie Meany"	2:44
6.	"Tower of Love"	3:48
7.	"Key of C"	3:25
8.	"Turbulent Weather"	3:07
9.	"Turn Your Frown into a Smile"	5:12
10.	"A Quiet Man"	3:10
11.	"Eanie Meany 2"	2:51
12.	"The Only Way" ("The Only Way" ends at 3:31, hidden track "I Can't See" begins at 5:01)	6:45
Total length:		45:35

U.S. release
No.	Title	Length
1.	"My Patch"	4:05
2.	"I Me You I'm Your"	2:40
3.	"Computer Song"	2:56
4.	"How to Be So Real"	4:52
5.	"Eanie Meany"	2:44
6.	"Tower of Love"	3:48
7.	"Key of C"	3:27
8.	"Tell Me What to Do" (U.S. Exclusive Track)	5:20
9.	"Climb a Tree" (U.S. Exclusive Track)	4:50
10.	"Turbulent Weather"	3:07
11.	"A Quiet Man"	3:10
12.	"Eanie Meany 2"	2:53
13.	"The Only Way"	3:34
Total length:		44:33

Japan release
No.	Title	Length
1.	"My Patch"	4:03
2.	"I Me You I'm Your"	2:38
3.	"Computer Song"	2:55
4.	"How to Be So Real"	4:51
5.	"Eanie Meany"	2:42
6.	"Tower of Love"	3:47
7.	"Key of C"	3:23
8.	"Turbulent Weather"	3:05
9.	"Turn Your Frown into a Smile"	5:11
10.	"A Quiet Man"	3:09
11.	"Eanie Meany 2"	2:52
12.	"The Only Way"	3:32
13.	"Going On Holiday" (Japan Bonus Track)	3:42
14.	"Why?" (Japan Bonus Track)	4:39
Total length:		48:29
