= Jim Noir =

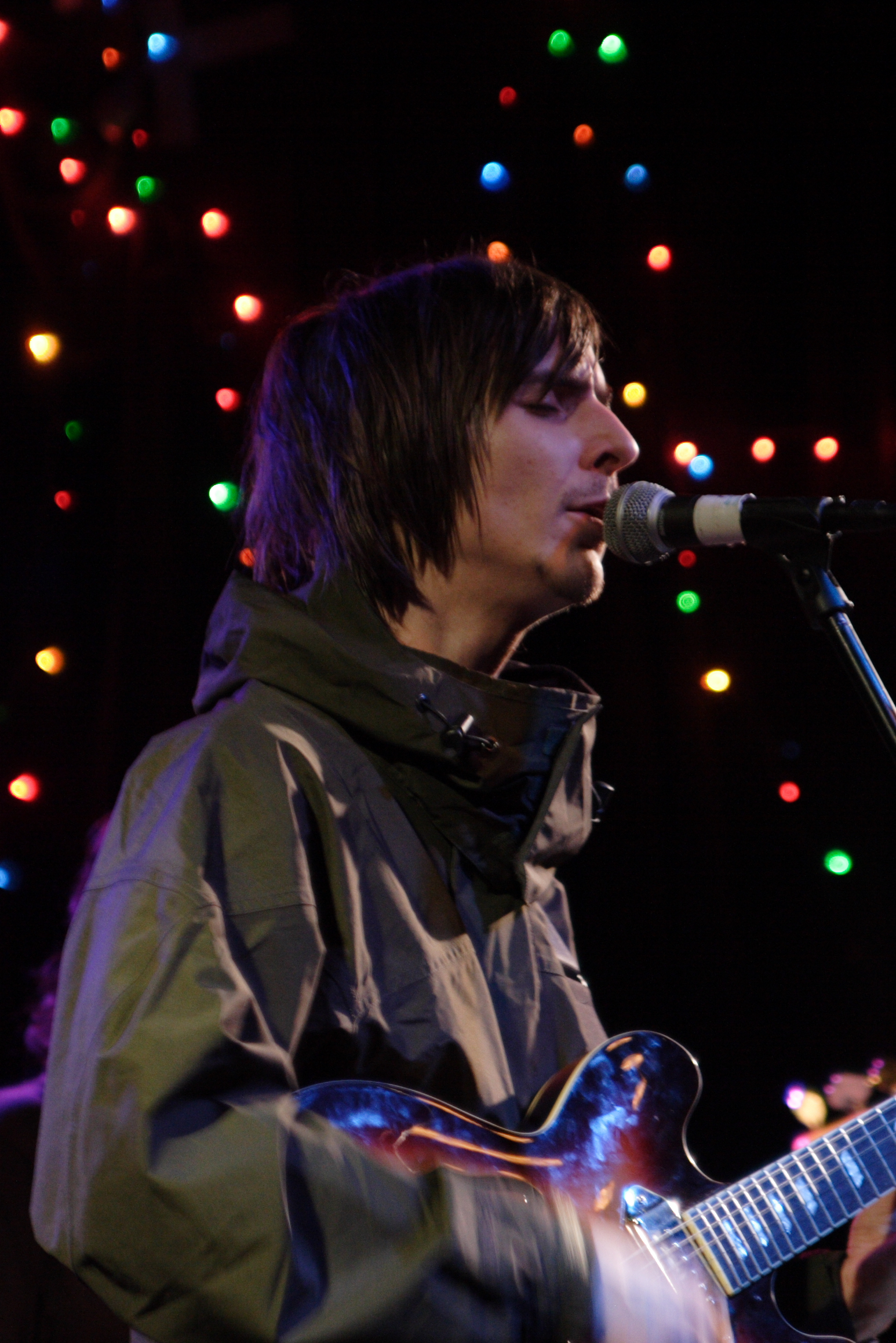
- Noir in 2006

Background information
- Born: Alan Peter Roberts; 1982 (age 43–44); Davyhulme, Greater Manchester, England
- Genres: Indie pop, neo-psychedelia, electronica, hauntology
- Occupations: Composer, producer
- Instruments: Guitar, bass, keyboard, drums
- Years active: 2004–present
- Labels: My Dad/Atlantic (UK); Barsuk Records (US)

Alan Peter Roberts (born 1982), known professionally as Jim Noir, is an English musician and producer from Davyhulme, Greater Manchester. He has released five albums to date: 2005's Tower of Love, 2008's self-titled LP Jim Noir, 2012's Jimmy's Show, 2014's Finnish Line, and 2019's A.M. Jazz, as well as a number of EPs.

== Biography ==
Noir's stage name is in homage to Vic Reeves, whose real name is Jim Moir. His early releases, including Tower of Love as well as all of the preceding EPs, were self-recorded at his parents' home in Davyhulme, Manchester.

Noir's music has been described as psychedelic pop electronica with simple, often repetitive lyrics. Noir is a multi-instrumentalist, playing all the instruments on his work. He uses a band at performances.

He played at the 2006 and 2008 South by Southwest music festival in Austin, Texas and is currently signed to Seattle-based indie label Barsuk Records in the States, and Manchester label My Dad Recordings in the UK. Noir released the single "My Patch" in the UK on 1 May 2006. Jim Noir's second album, Jim Noir was released on 14 April 2008, and Noir announced via MySpace blog that his currently unnamed third album was complete as of 14 March 2009. On 17 November 2010, Jim Noir released a new six-track EP titled Zooper Dooper.

On 17 September 2012, Noir released his third full-length studio album Jimmy's Show, composed of the best songs taken from his members-only Noir Club releases spanning the years 2010-2012.

On 21 December 2018, Noir announced via Facebook, that his new seventh full-length studio album would be named A.M. Jazz.

On 11 July 2023, Noir announced via Facebook, that his new album would be named Jimmy's Show 2, a sequel to his 2012 album Jimmy's Show. On 14 November 2025, he announced that the album would be renamed to Programmes for Cools, and set a release date for 20 February 2026.

== Commercial and pop-culture appearances ==
Several of Noir's songs have been featured on television programs or adapted for commercials.

- On the 2009 American documentary film "September Issue" about the behind-the-scenes drama that follows editor-in-chief Anna Wintour and her staff during the production of the September 2007 issue of American Vogue magazine, Jim Noir's song "Don't You Worry" was featured.
- On the TV series Grey's Anatomy, the song "I Me You I'm Your" was featured on episode "Owner of a Lonely Heart" and was also included on the Season 2 soundtrack. The show has also featured the songs "My Patch" and "Tell Me What to Do" in other episodes.
- In 2006 Adidas used a remix of "Eanie Meany" for their World Cup advertising (Josè +10, second part). The song begins, "If you don't give my football back, I'm gonna get my dad on you."
- Ginsters used "My Patch" for an ad campaign in the UK in 2006 and 2007.
- For the 2007 holiday season, Target featured a commercial in which an adaptation of Noir's song "My Patch" is playing while windows in a large Advent calendar open and close. The original lyrics, "If you ever step on my patch / I'll bring you down, I'll bring you down" were modified. In the commercial, A different singer sings "Holidays are times of magic / We're counting down, we're counting down".
- The BBC Radio 4 panel game The Unbelievable Truth uses the opening bars of "My Patch" as its theme song.
- "My Patch" was used in a trailer for the PlayStation 3 video game LittleBigPlanet, which was shown at the E3 games conference, and also as a main track in the full game. It can be heard in various levels.
- On the TV Series Life, the song "Don't You Worry" was used on episode 218 and "Happy Day Today" was used on 208.
- The opening bars of "My Patch" featured in an episode of Totally Jodie Marsh: Who'll Take Her Up the Aisle?
- In 2009, the song "Tell Me What to Do" was featured on Ugly Betty in the episode "The Courtship of Betty's Father" (3x14).

== Discography ==
=== Albums ===
- Tower of Love (December 2005)
- Jim Noir (April 2008)
- Jimmy's Show (September 2012)
- Finnish Line (November 2014)
- A.M Jazz (20 December 2019)
- Programmes for Cools (20 February 2026)

=== Singles and EPs ===
- A Bird Sings in Wool (2003)
- Eanie Meany EP (2004)
- My Patch EP (2005)
- A Quiet Man EP (2005)
- Key of C (2006)
- My Patch (re-issue) (2006) No.65 UK
- Eanie Meany (re-issue) (2006) No.67 UK
- All Right EP (2007)
- What U Gonna Do (2008)
- Zooper Dooper EP (2010)
- In Hell Single (2015)
- Deep Blue View EP (2021)
- This Was That (Side A) (2024)
- Out of Sight (2024)
- Emergency EP (2025)

=== Noir Club releases ===
Every month, a new EP or demo album was given away for free through the official Jim Noir newsletter Noir Club.

- Melody Junction (December 2010)
- Super Hooper Dookie Bay by The Dook (January 2011)
- Early Learnings 98 - 05 Part I (February 2011)
- Early Learnings 98 - 05 Part II (March 2011)
- Early Learnings 98 - 05 Part III' (April 2011)
- Pieces of Bob (May 2011)
- Rainbuns and Blank Ends (June 2011)
- Special Features of a Camel (July 2011)
- The Cheese of Jim's Command (August 2011)
- Intermission (September 2011)
- Timepiece (October 2011)
- Light End at The (November 2011)
- For Nearby Devil (December 2011)
- Jim and the Beep Seals Live at Electric Picnic 2006 (December 2011)
- Helicopters Left (January 2012)
- The End (February 2012)
- HELLO EP (May 2022)
- EP 2 (June 2022)
- EP 3 (July 2022)
- Omission Sound - 'Solutions (2000)' (July 2022)
- EP 5 (September 2022)
- EP 6 (October 2022)
- EP 7 (November 2022)
- Mish Mash EP (February 2023)
- Montreal EP (March 2023)
- Cubist Castle Album (2000) (April 2023)
- Tennith (May 2023)
- EP 12 (July 2023)
- Ladybird EP (March 2024)
- Jim Noir Random Electrics (April 2024)
- This Was That (Side A) (June 2024)
- Serious Mature Photo Music (July 2024)
- A Few Bits I Probably Won't Finish........EP (September 2024)
- Surprise EP (January 2025)
