= Badly Drawn Boy discography =

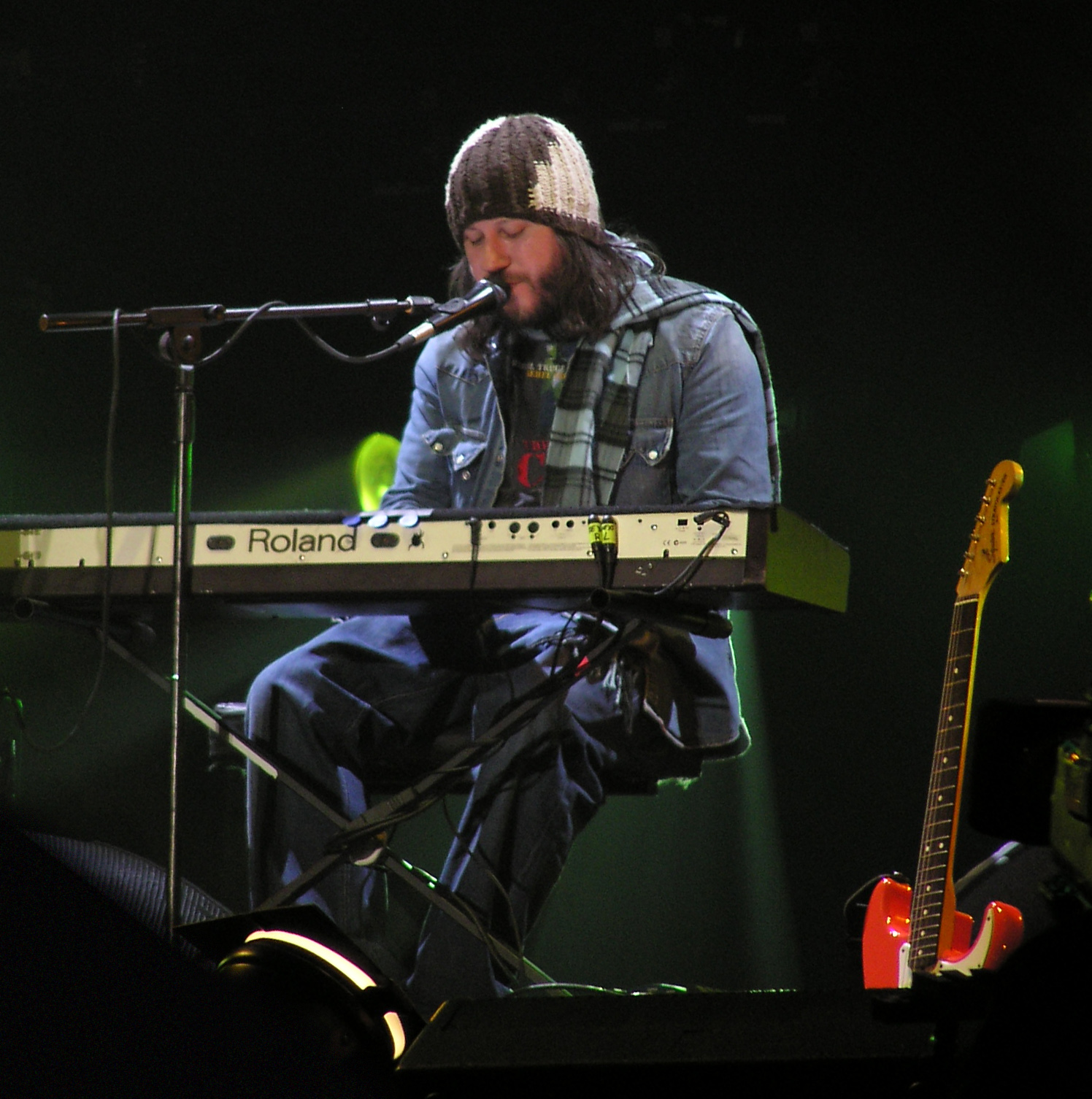
- Badly Drawn Boy performing in January 2005
- Studio albums: 8
- Extended plays: 6
- Compilation albums: 1
- Singles: 16

The discography of English alternative music singer/songwriter Badly Drawn Boy (real name Damon Gough) includes eight studio albums (including two soundtracks), one compilation, six extended plays and twenty-one singles. The first EP and several singles were released on Gough's own label "Twisted Nerve", which he started with like-minded Manchester musician Andy Votel. Badly Drawn Boy rose in popularity in 1997 when he joined the likes of Thom Yorke, Richard Ashcroft, and Mike D on the celebrity-filled Unkle album Psyence Fiction. Due to the mild UK chart success of the 1999 single "Once Around the Block", XL Recordings signed up Badly Drawn Boy to release the debut album The Hour of Bewilderbeast in 2000. The album won critical praise and Britain's acclaimed Mercury Prize for Best Album. The album caught the attention of author Nick Hornby who then asked Gough to score the film being made for his book About a Boy.

== Albums ==
=== Studio albums ===
Title	Album details	Peak chart positions										Certifications
Title	Album details	UK	AUS	BEL	FRA	GER	IRE	ITA	NED	SCO	US	Certifications
The Hour of Bewilderbeast	Released: 26 June 2000; Label: XL/Twisted Nerve	13	—	—	—	—	19	—	—	14	—	UK: Platinum
About a Boy	Released: 23 April 2002; Label: XL/Twisted Nerve	6	42	—	—	53	6	—	100	4	180	UK: Platinum
Have You Fed the Fish?	Released: 5 November 2002; Label: XL/Twisted Nerve	10	—	—	—	87	11	—	—	10	135	UK: Gold
One Plus One Is One	Released: 21 June 2004; Label: XL/Twisted Nerve	9	95	98	160	92	39	63	—	9	—	UK: Silver
Born in the U.K.	Released: 16 October 2006; Label: EMI/Twisted Nerve	17	—	95	200	—	54	53	—	23	—	UK: Silver
Is There Nothing We Could Do?	Released: 14 December 2009; Label: Big Life	—	—	—	—	—	—	—	—	—	—	
It's What I'm Thinking Pt.1 – Photographing Snowflakes	Released: 4 October 2010; Label: One Last Fruit	63	—	—	—	—	—	—	—	98	—	
Being Flynn	Released: 28 February 2012; Label: Lakeshore Records	—	—	—	—	—	—	—	—	—	—	
Banana Skin Shoes	Released: 22 May 2020; Label: One Last Fruit	34	—	—	—	—	—	—	—	—	—	
"—" denotes items that did not chart or were not released in that territory.

=== Compilation albums ===
Title	Album details
How Did I Get Here?	Released: December 1999; Label: Twisted Nerve

== Extended plays ==
- EP1 (September 1997)
- EP2 (April 1998)
- EP3 (November 1998)
- It Came from the Ground (March 1999) - Chart Position: #1 [Budget Albums Chart] (2000) (UK)
- The Guardian Presents Badly Drawn Boy (2002) (6 tracks given away with The Guardian newspaper)
- BDB at the Britons Protection (15 December 2007) (rare limited edition 4 Track EP (only 100 Numbered Copies, Signed & Folded on the night by Damon himself for this Special Gig, for Family & Close Friends)

== Singles ==
Year	Title	Peak chart positions					Album
Year	Title	UK	UK Indie	IRE	NED	SCO	Album
1999	"Road Movie (Live)" (featuring Doves)	—	—	—	—	—	Non-album singles
1999	"Whirlpool"	—	—	—	—	—	Non-album singles
1999	"Once Around the Block"	46	5	—	—	44	The Hour of Bewilderbeast
2000	"Another Pearl"	41	6	—	—	40	The Hour of Bewilderbeast
2000	"Disillusion"	26	5	—	83	27	The Hour of Bewilderbeast
2000	"Once Around the Block" (re-issue)	27	7	—	—	33	The Hour of Bewilderbeast
2001	"Pissing in the Wind"	22	1	—	—	22	The Hour of Bewilderbeast
2002	"Silent Sigh"	16	1	39	—	15	About a Boy (soundtrack)
2002	"Something to Talk About"	28	5	—	—	24	About a Boy (soundtrack)
2002	"You Were Right"	9	1	—	—	10	Have You Fed the Fish?
2003	"Born Again"	16	4	—	—	19	Have You Fed the Fish?
2003	"All Possibilities"	24	2	—	—	34	Have You Fed the Fish?
2004	"Year of the Rat"	38	4	—	—	41	One Plus One Is One
2006	"Nothing's Gonna Change Your Mind"	38	—	—	—	27	Born in the U.K.
2007	"A Journey from A to B"	78	—	—	—	29	Born in the U.K.
2010	"I Saw You Walk Away"	—	—	—	—	—	It's What I'm Thinking Pt.1 – Photographing Snowflakes
2010	"Too Many Miracles"	—	—	—	—	—	It's What I'm Thinking Pt.1 – Photographing Snowflakes
2019	"The Place I Want to Be" (with Saint Saviour)	—	—	—	—	—	Non-album single
2020	"Is This a Dream?"	—	—	—	—	—	Banana Skin Shoes
2020	"Banana Skin Shoes"	—	—	—	—	—	Banana Skin Shoes
2020	"I Just Wanna Wish You Happiness"	—	—	—	—	—	Banana Skin Shoes
2020	"I Need Someone to Trust"	—	—	—	—	—	Banana Skin Shoes
2020	"I'm Not Sure What It Is"	—	—	—	—	—	Banana Skin Shoes
"—" denotes items that did not chart or were not released in that territory.

=== Other single releases ===
- 2001: "Donna and Blitzen" (special Christmas 7" vinyl release; also appears on the 2003 holiday compilation album, Maybe This Christmas Too?)
- 2006: "Born in the U.K." (limited edition vinyl release)
- 2006: "Welcome to the Overground" (released under the name of Cubilas, 1 sided one-track 12" of the album track; limited to 500 copies)
- 2007: "Promises" (limited edition 7" & 12" vinyl release/download release - not released as a CD-single)
- 2008: "The Time of Times" (download release)
- 2009: "Is There Nothing We Could Do?" (promo release)

== Appearances and contributions ==
- "Nursery Rhyme" (from Unkle's Psyence Fiction 1998)
- All Oar Nothing (November 1998)
- Christmas Stocking Filler (December 1998)
- Modern Music For Motorcycles (January 2000)
- Bends For 166 Miles (24 April 2000)
- Sounds Eclectic (Broadcast 17 November 2000) (2001)
- Everything You Always Wanted To Know About Twisted Nerve But Were Too Afraid To Ask (1 October 2001)
- "Come On Eileen" - Badly Drawn Boy & Jools Holland 1 Love (War Child Album) (2002)
- Zoo (16 September 2002)
- Uncut Born to Run Vol 1 (2003) (Bruce Springsteen's "Thunder Road")
