= Jack Taylor (heavyweight man) =

Former British heaviest man

Jack Taylor

Jack Taylor (1945 or 1946 – 4 February 2006) was reputedly Britain's fattest man.

Taylor claimed to weigh 700 pounds (50 st) (or 317 kg) being 48st when he worked at Morley's using their weighbridge. He wore specially made trousers measuring 80 inches (200 cm) at the waist. He became all but a recluse, spending his days simply eating and watching videos, venturing outside exclusively for hospital appointments. Taylor achieved notoriety in Germany for his eccentric appearance, notably a wig which he fashioned himself from electrical tape. If anyone asked him about his "hair", he would answer "It's Jack's creation, Jack likes it and it suits him!".

His diet was said to consist of up to 15 Tandoori naan each day. He achieved some notoriety as a result of his size, including appearing on the TV show The Fattest Men in Britain alongside Barry Austin. In one TV show, Being The Fattest Man, he was weighed at 31 stones (or 196kg). However, Taylor believed he was much heavier, and this annoyed him greatly; he insisted the scales were faulty. He died on 4 February 2006 at the age of 60 from a heart attack. Taylor was cremated at Rawdon crematorium in Leeds, which has special facilities to deal with larger coffins.

In 2009 a fictionalized account of his later years in life was made into TV movie called The Fattest Man in Britain.
