= The Fattest Man in Britain =

2009 comedic TV movie

- Timothy Spall in The Fattest Man in Britain
- Written by: Caroline Aherne; Jeff Pope
- Directed by: David Blair
- Country of origin: United Kingdom
- Original language: English

Original release
- Network: ITV
- Release: 20 December 2009

The Fattest Man in Britain is a comedy-drama written by Caroline Aherne and Jeff Pope, and directed by David Blair, which aired on ITV on 20 December 2009. It starred Timothy Spall, wearing a fat suit for the title role, Bobby Ball, Aisling Loftus and Barry Austin. The plot is loosely based on a real-life event when Britain's then self-styled 'Fattest Man' Jack Taylor was defeated in a 'weigh off' by Barry Austin in the 2001 television documentary The Fattest Men in Britain.

== Synopsis ==
Taxi-driver Morris Morrissey (Bobby Ball) is the manager of Georgie Godwin (Timothy Spall), the self-styled 'Fattest Man in Britain'. Morris feeds Georgie who hasn't left his house in 23 years and stays in watching Jeremy Kyle shows and programmes about distant places in the world, which he marks off on a globe. He relies on Morris and Janice (Frances Barber) to provide him with everything he needs to live. Georgie's garden is overgrown after 23 years of neglect, and Social Services send a community service worker to clean the garden, which Georgie is not too sure about. When the community service worker turns up, it is 18-year-old Amy (Aisling Loftus). While Amy pulls weeds, cuts the grass and hedge and plants flowers, Georgie watches her and tells Janice what she's done that day. One day while Amy is working in the garden, her abusive boyfriend Joe turns up and shouts and pushes her. Seeing this, Georgie bangs on the window and Joe hurriedly leaves. Amy goes inside and Georgie offers her various types of chocolate but Amy says she is pregnant to which Georgie replies "If you're as good as a mother as you are with my garden, you're gonna be a great mum". One night while Morris and Janice are round Georgie's, Amy turns up with cuts on her face and says her drug addict boyfriend Joe kicked and punched her. Georgie says Amy can stay at his, in his Mum's old room. In return (and because she sees Georgie as a father figure), Amy cooks his dinner, cuts his hair and redecorates the house.

As time goes on, Amy dislikes the way people "disrespect" Georgie and offers to cook him low fat meals, but Georgie tells her that Morris takes care of that. It comes to a head when, after coming back from seeing rival manager Morley Raisin (Tim Woodward) Morris tells Georgie that there's going to be a live weigh-off between him and rival 'Big Brian' (Barry Austin). But Amy says they should be helping Georgie to lose weight, not gain it, and is told it has nothing to do with her by Morris.

After being given fatty foods by his friends and neighbours to 'bulk' him up ready for the 'weigh off', Georgie comes to believe he is the 'fattest man in Britain'. But during the live weigh-off, Georgie weighs 42 stone while Big Brian weighs 54 stone. After the weigh-off, Georgie tells Amy that without the title of 'Britain's fattest man' he's 'just another fat man'.

"When I went out I’d always get the same… 'Michelin Man' or 'Mr Wobbly' or Fuckin' Fat Twat'. I heard 'em… And then along came Morris with his enthusiasm and panache. And suddenly people were paying to come and see me, all right, mainly foreigners, but I didn’t have to be ashamed of me size no more – do you see?

So that’s why that title is so important to me: The Fattest Man in Britain. Because if I’m not the fattest, Amy, then what am I, eh? Just a fat man, Amy."

Amy goes into labour and Georgie calls 999 but falls over while trying to get her bag. Whilst on the floor Amy and Georgie sing Moon River in a bid to comfort Amy as he is unable to get up. The next day, still lying on the floor, Janice rings Georgie and tells him that Amy lost the baby and that it was a boy.

When Janice goes round to Georgie's, she is unable to get him up and rings 999. While waiting for the fire brigade, Georgie tells Janice they need to record all the Jeremy Kyle shows so Amy can rest when she gets back, but Janice gives Georgie a letter from Amy. After being helped up by the fire brigade, Georgie reads the letter in which Amy says she won't be coming back because she can't bear to watch Georgie eat himself to death and also adds that she had called the baby 'Georgie'.

Georgie stops eating altogether (unlike when his Mum died, where he didn't stop eating). He is visited by Father O'Flaherty (Brendan O'Carroll) who bluntly tells him to lose weight. When Morris goes round, Georgie tells him it's over because he's not 'Britains biggest man' but Morris sobs that Georgie has always been 'Britain's fattest man' to him. While looking at the mess in the garden, Georgie gets up and, for the first time in 23 years, leaves the house and starts walking to the hairdressing salon where Amy now works. On the way, Georgie is stared and shouted at. When Amy sees him, they reconcile.

The drama ends with Morris driving a batch of tourists, saying they are going to see 'Britain's Greatest Weight Loser' and shows a smiling, slim Georgie getting out of a hairdresser's chair where Amy has cut his hair.

== Production details ==
The Fattest Man in Britain was an ITV Studios production for ITV. The drama was commissioned by Commissioning Editor of Comedy at ITV, Michaela Hennessy-Vass; and the Executive Producer was Saurabh Kakkar. Also it was directed by David Blair and produced by Jeff Pope.

The drama's soundtrack was by Manchester-based artist Badly Drawn Boy, who wrote and recorded new tracks exclusively for the drama. He has released an album, Is There Nothing We Could Do?, which is inspired by his music for the film, his first release since his Born in the U.K. album in 2006.

== Cast ==
- Timothy Spall – Georgie Godwin
- Bobby Ball – Morris Morrissey
- Frances Barber – Janice
- Aisling Loftus – Amy
- Barry Austin – Big Brian
- David Williams – Mad Bob
- Archie Lal – Raj
- Richard Riddell – Joe
- Brendan O'Carroll – Fr O'Flaherty
- Alice Barry – Joyce
- Tim Woodward – Morley Raisin
- Mark Chatterton – Richard Barter
- Julian Walsh – Clive
- Akira Koieyama – Japanese man
- Yuriri Naka – Japanese woman
- Claire Ashforth – Newsreader
- Liz Hume-Dawson – Woman

== DVD release ==
A DVD of The Fattest Man in Britain was released on 28 December 2009.
