= Never Change Me =

Never Change Me may refer to:

- "Never Change Me", a 2002 song by Shawn Desman from Shawn Desman (album)
- "Never Change Me", a 2012 song by Unisonic from Unisonic (album)

== See also ==
- Never Change (disambiguation)
