= Something to Talk About =

Something to Talk About may refer to:

- Something to Talk About (album), a 1986 album by Anne Murray
- "Something to Talk About" (Badly Drawn Boy song), a 2002 song by Badly Drawn Boy from the soundtrack to the film About a Boy
- "Something to Talk About" (Bonnie Raitt song), a 1991 song written by Shirley Eikhard and recorded by Bonnie Raitt
- Something to Talk About (film), a 1995 romantic comedy-drama film directed by Lasse Hallström
- "Something to Talk About" (Grey's Anatomy), a 2005 episode of the medical drama TV series Grey's Anatomy
- Something to Talk About (documentary series), a 2013 series of documentaries presented by Brainstorm Media and DirecTV
