= Never Change =

Never Change may refer to:

== Music ==
=== Albums ===
- Never Change (album) or its title track, by South Park Mexican, 2001
- Never Change, album by Freddy Jones Band, 2015
- Never Change (Tsuyoshi Nagabuchi album), cover album by Tsuyoshi Nagabuchi, 1988
- Never Change, EP by Mahalia (singer), 2015

=== Songs ===
- "Never Change" (song), a 2009 song by Fightstar
- "Never Change", by AZ from A.W.O.L. (album), 2005
- "Never Change", by Badly Drawn Boy from Banana Skin Shoes, 2020
- "Never Change", by Bill Conti from The Thomas Crown Affair (1999 film), 1999
- "Never Change", by BJ the Chicago Kid from Gravy (BJ the Chicago Kid album), 2023
- "Never Change", by Cartel MGM; produced by Lex Luger (music producer), 2013
- "Never Change", by Colonel Abrams from Colonel Abrams (album), 1985
- "Never Change", by Danny! featuring Kid Syc and Branden M. Collins from And I Love H.E.R.: Original Motion Picture Soundtrack, 2008
- "Never Change", by Dessau from Exercise in Tension, 1989
- "Never Change", by DJ Ryow featuring Ai (singer), AK-69 and Hannya, 2021
- "Never Change", by ITS Studios from To All the Boys: Always and Forever
- "Never Change", by Jay-Z from The Blueprint, 2001
- "Never Change", by Jon Caspi and the First Gun featuring Dez Cadena, 2019
- "Never Change", by KELTEK and Ran-D, 2024
- "Never Change", by Kimberley Chen from Kimberley (album), 2012
- "Never Change", by Lil' Keke from Peepin' in My Window, 2001
- "Never Change", by Lukas Graham from 4 (The Pink Album), 2023
- "Never Change", by Nav from Reckless (Nav album), 2018
- "Never Change", by Neal Morse from Sola Gratia (album), 2020
- "Never Change", by Oblivians from Soul Food (Oblivians album), 1995
- "Never Change", by Picture This from Picture This (Picture This album), 2017
- "Never Change", by Puddle of Mudd from Come Clean (Puddle of Mudd album), 2001
- "Never Change", by Shapiro on the record label Empire Distribution, 2021
- "Never Change", by Sóley from Harmóník I & II, 2020
- "Never Change", by Symba featuring Roddy Ricch, 2022
- "Never Change", by Thaiboy Digital from Back 2 Life (Thaiboy Digital album), 2022
- "Never Change", by Triple Redd featuring Future from Pegasus (Trippie Redd album), 2020
- "Never Change", by Twiztid from Mad Season (Twiztid album), 2020
- "Never Change", by Warumpi Band from Too Much Humbug, 1996
- "Never Change", by Witness from A Song in the Night (album), 1996
- "Never Change", by Coin (band); written and produced by Morgan Taylor Reid, 2020
- "Never Change", by Debbie Sledge, 2019
- "Never Change", by Don Diablo, 2019
- "Never Change", by Dylan Conrique, 2023
- "Never Change", by Getter (DJ) with HvrdLxck, 2019
- "Never Change", by Gradur, 2016
- "Never Change", by Isa Tengblad, 2020
- "Never Change", by Jehangir Aziz Hayat, 2004
- "Never Change", by Key Glock, 2020
- "Never Change", by Kid Ink; produced by Sonny Digital, 2011
- "Never Change", by Tika Patsatsia, 2008
- Never Change (Tsuyoshi Nagabuchi song), by Tsuyoshi Nagabuchi, 1988, not included on his album of the same name

== Film and television ==
=== Films ===
- Never Change!, a 2026 American comedy film
- Never Change, a 1988 film by Jem Cohen

=== Episodes ===
- "Never Change", a 2006 episode of Coyote Ragtime Show, episode 5
- "Never Change", a 2025 episode of Nine Perfect Strangers (TV series), episode 8, season 2
- "Never Change...", a 2016 episode of Rin-ne, episode 22, season 2
- "Never Change", a 2013 commercial featuring Jon Watts

== Books ==
- Never Change, a 2001 book by Elizabeth Berg (author)
- "Never Change", the fourth chapter of the 2023 sixteenth volume of the manga Undead Unluck
- "Never Change", a chapter of the 2020 comic book Wonder Woman (comic book) by Greg Rucka and Nicola Scott

== See also ==
- Never Change Me (disambiguation)
