= Silent Sigh =

Single by Badly Drawn Boy

from the album About a Boy
- Released: 13 August 2002
- Genre: Indie pop, alternative rock
- Length: 10:24
- Label: XL Recordings/Beggars Group
- Songwriter(s): Damon Gough
- Producer(s): Badly Drawn Boy, Tom Rothrock

Badly Drawn Boy singles chronology
""Donna and Blitzen" (promo)" (2001)	"Silent Sigh" (2002)	"Something to Talk About" (2002)

"Silent Sigh" is a single by British musical artist Badly Drawn Boy from the soundtrack to the film About a Boy. It reached number 16 in the UK Singles Chart.

== Track listing ==
All tracks are written by Damon Gough

No.	Title	Length
1.	"Silent Sigh (Radio Edit)"	4:01
2.	"Silent Sigh (Acoustic Version)"	3:37
3.	"A Better Way"	2:46

== Cover versions ==
- Polish singer Ania covered "Silent Sigh" on her 2010 album Ania Movie. The song was released as the final single off the album.
- A xylophone instrumental version of the song is featured on Children's TV show Something Special broadcast on the BBC channel CBeebies.
