= You Were Right (Badly Drawn Boy song) =

2002 single by Badly Drawn Boy

Single by Badly Drawn Boy

from the album Have You Fed the Fish?
- B-side: "Last Fruit"
- Released: 14 October 2002
- Studio: Cello (Los Angeles); The Embassy (Basingstoke, UK); Olympic (London, England)
- Length: 4:49
- Label: Twisted Nerve; XL
- Songwriter: Badly Drawn Boy
- Producers: Tom Rothrock; Badly Drawn Boy

Badly Drawn Boy singles chronology
"Something to Talk About" (2002)	"You Were Right" (2002)	"Born Again" (2003)

"You Were Right" is the first single released from English singer-songwriter Badly Drawn Boy's second studio album, Have You Fed the Fish? He recorded the song and album following his work on the soundtrack to the 2002 romantic comedy-drama film About a Boy. The song, written through the process of arranging random words into fluent verses, contains references to several musicians, including Madonna, Frank Sinatra, Jeff Buckley, Kurt Cobain, and John Lennon, as well as Elizabeth II.

"You Were Right" was released in the United Kingdom on 14 October 2002, debuting and peaking at number nine on the UK Singles Chart but staying in the top 100 for only three weeks. It remains Badly Drawn Boy's highest-charting single and sole top-10 hit in the UK. On the Eurochart Hot 100, the track charted for one week at number 45. The music video for the song was directed by Simon Henwood.

== Background ==
Badly Drawn Boy first wrote the song when he thought of the phrase 'the night Sinatra died'. He created the melody of the song and presented it to his parents, who responded with indifference, but the singer believed that the song possessed something. After composing the opening line, 'And you were right to bide your time / And not buy into my misery', he then sang random words into a Dictaphone and analysed the results. Once he had arranged the phrases into a pleasing outcome, he met with producer Tom Rothrock and drummer Joey Waronker to set the composition to music. It was recorded at three studios: Cello Studios in Los Angeles, California; the Embassy in Basingstoke, England; and Olympic Studios in London, England.

== Lyrical content ==
Badly Drawn Boy composed the lyric to "You Were Right" by arranging random words into a song that both made sense and reflected upon his life. It eventually resulted in the tribute verse that mentions the deaths of several of Badly Drawn Boy's idols—Kurt Cobain, Jeff Buckley, and John Lennon. He then came up with the line about Madonna, 'I'm turning Madonna down / Calling it my best move', then began to piece the indiscriminate lines together until he achieved the message he wanted the song to send. According to Badly Drawn Boy, the song is about 'not wasting the chance with real life just because you got this opportunity to be a pop star,' and it serves as a 'reminder of what's important and not to lose your marbles'.

== Critical reception ==
AllMusic critic Tom Maginnis wrote that "You Were Right" is an 'ambitiously orchestrated bit of pop music that is equal parts confessional and affirmation', and that Badly Drawn Boy 'manage[d] to pull it all together in a bittersweet, tumultuous swirl, built around a halting mid-tempo beat that combines layers of guitars and strings to which Gough sings with a matter of fact directness that gives emotional weight to his almost free associative soul baring ... All tolled [sic], "You Were Right" reveals a deeply thoughtful songwriter, interweaving mature themes into compelling music that challenges both himself and his listeners'.

== Track listings ==
UK and Australian CD single

1. "You Were Right" – 4:49
2. "Last Fruit" – 4:20
3. "You Were Right" (live at Glastonbury 2002) – 5:34

UK and Australian 7-inch single

A. "You Were Right"
B. "Last Fruit"

== Credits and personnel ==
Credits are taken from the UK CD single liner notes.

Studios

- Recorded at Cello Studios (Los Angeles), the Embassy (Basingstoke, England), and Olympic Studios (London, England)

Personnel

- Badly Drawn Boy – writing, vocals, guitars, piano, synthesizer, production
- John "Gumby" Goodwin – steel guitar
- Sasha Krivtsov – bass
- Joey Waronker – drums
- Matt Dunkley – string arrangement and conducting
- Tom Rothrock – production, mixing
- John Paterno – engineering
- Dan Porter – assistant engineering
- Darren Mora – assistant engineering
- Mike Tarantino – digital editing, additional engineering
- Andy Votel – artwork

== Charts ==
Chart (2002)	Peak position
Europe (Eurochart Hot 100)	45
Scotland Singles (Official Charts)	10
UK Singles (Official Charts)	9
UK Indie (Official Charts)	1

== Release history ==
Region	Date	Format(s)	Label(s)	Ref.
United Kingdom	14 October 2002	7-inch vinyl; CD	Twisted Nerve; XL	
Australia	21 October 2002	7-inch vinyl; CD	Twisted Nerve; XL	
United States	28 October 2002	Triple A radio	ARTISTdirect	
