= Something to Talk About (Badly Drawn Boy song) =

Single by Badly Drawn Boy

from the album About a Boy (soundtrack)
- Released: 10 June 2002
- Label: Import
- Songwriter(s): Damon Gough
- Producer(s): Badly Drawn Boy, Tom Rothrock

Badly Drawn Boy singles chronology
"Silent Sigh" (2002)	"Something to Talk About" (2002)	"You Were Right" (2002)

"Something to Talk About" is a song by British musical artist Badly Drawn Boy from About a Boy. It was released as a single on 10 June 2002. It peaked at number 28 on the UK Singles Chart.

== Music video ==
A music video was filmed to promote the song, and features Hugh Grant watching Badly Drawn Boy performing the song on TV.

== Track listing ==
No.	Title	Length
1.	"Something to Talk About"
2.	"Something to Talk About (The Four Tet Convention Mix)"
3.	"Something to Talk About (Misty Dixon Remix)"
