= It's What I'm Thinking Pt.1 – Photographing Snowflakes =

Studio album by Badly Drawn Boy
- Released: 4 October 2010
- Genre: Rock and roll, folk
- Length: 44:35
- Label: One Last Fruit
- Producer: Stephen Hilton

Badly Drawn Boy chronology
Is There Nothing We Could Do? (2009)	It's What I'm Thinking Pt.1 – Photographing Snowflakes (2010)	Being Flynn (2012)

Professional ratings
Review scores
Source	Rating
AllMusic	3.5/5 stars
The A.V. Club	B+
CrackleFeedback	7/10 stars
Drowned in Sound	4/5 stars
The Guardian	4/5 stars
NME	3.5/5 stars
Spin	2.5/5 stars
Uncut	3/5 stars

It's What I'm Thinking Pt.1 – Photographing Snowflakes is the seventh studio album by Badly Drawn Boy, released on 4 October 2010. The album was said to be heavily influenced by The Smiths.

== Track listing ==
1. "In Safe Hands" – 4:02
2. "The Order of Things" – 5:14
3. "Too Many Miracles" – 3:45
4. "What Tomorrow Brings" – 3:44
5. "I Saw You Walk Away" – 5:29
6. "It's What I'm Thinking" – 6:27
7. "You Lied" – 3:05
8. "A Pure Accident" – 3:53
9. "This Electric" – 4:18
10. "This Beautiful Idea" – 4:42
