= Born in the U.K. =

Studio album by Badly Drawn Boy
- Released: 16 October 2006
- Length: 52:05
- Label: EMI/Twisted Nerve Records; Astralwerks (US)
- Producer: Badly Drawn Boy, Nick Franglen

Badly Drawn Boy chronology
One Plus One Is One (2004)	Born in the U.K. (2006)	Is There Nothing We Could Do? (2009)

Special CD+DVD version

Professional ratings
Aggregate scores
Source	Rating
Metacritic	57/100
Review scores
Source	Rating
AllMusic	3/5 stars
The Guardian	3/5 stars
Pitchfork	2.8/10
Q	4/5 stars

Born in the U.K. is the fifth album released by the singer-songwriter Badly Drawn Boy, real name Damon Gough, released on 16 October 2006. The album's title is a reference to Bruce Springsteen’s 1984 album Born in the U.S.A.. Gough is a big fan of Springsteen, citing his work as an inspiration for his music.

Born in the U.K. was Gough's first album on his new record label EMI (his contract with his previous label XL Recordings collapsed in 2004) and is co-produced with Nick Franglen, one half of the acclaimed trip-hop/electronica outfit Lemon Jelly, another XL Recordings artist. The majority of the record recalls his 2002 album Have You Fed the Fish? due to its polished, heavily orchestrated sound.

The album is a reflection on the artist's life in the United Kingdom. Gough wanted to "capture something about being British or English". "I want to stand up and say I'm proud to be English. And it seems that that right's been taken away from us for some reason… being proud of where you're from is part of being a human being".

The album was recorded twice, the first having been discarded as Gough was unhappy with the recording. Worried that his second attempt at the album may again result in failure Gough attempted to "try to get a song out each day", which resulted in between sixty and eighty song ideas. Over 25 songs were finally recorded for the album, only 12 making the final cut.

The title track, "Born in the U.K.", was released as a limited edition vinyl, with authentic fish and chips style packaging, including a wooden chip fork commonly used to eat the English takeaway. The album's first official single, "Nothing's Going to Change Your Mind", was released on 9 October 2006.

The haunting ballad "Promises" was used on the soundtrack to the film Henry Poole Is Here, and "The Time of Times" was played over the closing credits of the 2008 film Definitely, Maybe.

The bonus DVD version contains the album documentary, the video to "Born in the U.K.", acoustic takes of "Born in the U.K." and "The Time of Times", and rehearsals of "Welcome to the Overground" and "Journey from A to B".

== Track listing ==
1. "Swimming Pool" – 1:40
2. "Born in the U.K." – 2:37
3. "Degrees of Separation" – 4:19
4. "Welcome to the Overground" – 3:24
5. "A Journey from A to B" – 3:48
6. "Nothing's Gonna Change Your Mind" – 5:17
7. "Promises" – 5:06
8. "The Way Things Used to Be" – 4:45
9. "Without a Kiss" – 5:37
10. "The Long Way Round (Swimming Pool)" – 3:43
11. "Walk You Home Tonight" – 3:45
12. "The Time of Times" – 3:16
13. "One Last Dance" – 4:47

== Chart positions ==
Chart (2006)	Peak position
Belgian Albums (Ultratop Flanders)	95
Belgian Alternative Albums (Ultratop Flanders)	95
French Albums (SNEP)	200
Scottish Albums (OCC)	23
Swedish Albums (Sverigetopplistan)	46
UK Albums (OCC)	17
