= One Plus One Is One =

Studio album by Badly Drawn Boy
- Released: 21 June 2004
- Recorded: June 2003
- Studio: Moolah Rouge Studio, Stockport, UK
- Genre: Folk rock, indie folk
- Length: 55:13 (61:37 U.S version)
- Label: XL Recordings, Twisted Nerve Records
- Producer: Badly Drawn Boy, Andy Votel

Badly Drawn Boy chronology
| Have You Fed the Fish? (2002) | One Plus One Is One (2004) | Born in the U.K. (2006) |

Professional ratings
Aggregate scores
| Source | Rating |
|---|---|
| Metacritic | 60/100 |
Review scores
| Source | Rating |
| Allmusic | 3.5/5 stars |
| Dotmusic | 8/10 |
| musicOMH | (favorable) |
| Pitchfork Media | 3/10 |

One Plus One Is One is the fourth studio album by Badly Drawn Boy, released in 2004. It is his last album for XL Recordings.

== Track listing ==
1. "One Plus One Is One" – 4:18
2. "Easy Love" – 3:02
3. "Summertime in Wintertime" – 3:02
4. "This Is That New Song" – 4:07
5. "Another Devil Dies" – 5:01
6. "The Blossoms" – 2:01
7. "Year of the Rat" – 4:43
8. "Four Leaf Clover" – 4:19
9. "Fewer Words" – 1:13
10. "Logic of a Friend" – 4:38
11. "Stockport" – 2:37
12. "Life Turned Upside Down" – 3:24
13. "Takes the Glory" – 5:02
14. "Holy Grail" – 8:13
15. "Don't Ask Me I'm Only the President" (U.S. version only) – 1:36
16. "Plan-B" (U.S. version only) – 4:47

== Personnel ==
- Damon Gough – vocals, acoustic and electric guitar, piano, celeste, Clavinet, Wurlitzer Fun-Maker, Hammond organ, Mellotron, Fender Rhodes piano, glockenspiel, banjo
- Alex Thomas AKA Earl Shilton – drums, timpani, gong, bells, orchestral crash cymbal
- Sean McCann – bass
- Andy Votel – tubular bells, cymbals, cowbell, chimes, samples and effects
- Bob Marsh – trumpet on track 1&5
- Roger Wickham – flute on track 2,3,5,6,14
- Chris Worsey – cello on track 1,4,13; electric cello on track 14
- Oliver Heath – violin on track 1,4,13
- Charles Ashby – percussion on track 5
- Norman Mcleod – slide guitar on track 14
- Colin Mcleod – accordion on track 14
- Stockport Music Project (STOMP) – vocals on tracks 7 and 14

== Charts ==
Chart performance for One Plus One Is One
| Chart (2002) | Peak position |
|---|---|
| Australian Albums (ARIA) | 95 |
| Belgian Albums (Ultratop Flanders) | 98 |
| French Albums (SNEP) | 160 |
| German Albums (Offizielle Top 100) | 92 |
| Irish Albums (IRMA) | 39 |
| Italian Albums (FIMI) | 63 |
| Scottish Albums (OCC) | 9 |
| UK Albums (OCC) | 9 |
