= Barry Austin =

Heaviest man in the UK (1968–2021)

Barry Austin (17 September 1968 – 1 January 2021) was a man from Castle Bromwich, West Midlands, England, who was widely reputed to be the fattest man in the United Kingdom.

== Life ==
Multiple press reports claim that at his peak weight, he weighed 50 stone (around 700 lbs or 320 kg).

Austin's appearances in the press and on television were usually related to current concerns about an alarming increase in obesity among the population. He had thus been asked to comment on news and current affairs strands such as the BBC's Breakfast News. Austin was also the star of a Sky One documentary, Inside Britain's Fattest Man, presented by fellow Silhillian Richard Hammond in the manner of the science fiction film Fantastic Voyage (1966). According to the programme, Austin typically consumed in excess of 29,000 calories a day – over ten times the average daily intake for a UK male, and had major health problems as a result of his morbid obesity. He also claimed to drink up to 40 pints on a night out. A previous documentary on Britain's heaviest men – The Fattest Men in Britain – which saw Austin take the crown, though he was notably lighter and more mobile at the time, reported that he led an actively social life and was something of a celebrity on the Birmingham club circuit, and a very visible supporter of Birmingham City F.C. at their home games. However, he was unable to attend their victorious Wembley Stadium appearance on 27 February 2011, when they lifted the Football League Cup with a 2–1 win over Arsenal in the final as he was too big to get a seat. By this stage he weighed 40 stone.

According to both documentaries, Austin's greatest problem was his legs (which had notably reduced his mobility in the latter programme). Starved of blood because of their enormous size and distance from his heart, they caused him to suffer regular terrible bacterial infections that left him swollen, in agony, and immobile at home. In September 2005, Austin committed himself to losing weight, restricting his daily intake to a mere 1,500 calories in a bid to save his life.

In November 2009 it was reported that Austin currently weighed 40 stone and was starting a new diet plan to try to lose at least 10 stone. The report also gave his peak weight as 65 stone.

In December 2009 Austin played 'Big Brian' in ITV1's comedy-drama The Fattest Man in Britain starring Timothy Spall and Bobby Ball.

Austin died on 1 January 2021 at the age of 52 due to a heart attack.

== See also ==
- List of the heaviest people
