= The Hour of Bewilderbeast =

Studio album by Badly Drawn Boy
- Released: 26 June 2000
- Genre: Indie rock, indie folk, chamber pop
- Length: 63:25
- Label: XL, Twisted Nerve
- Producer: Badly Drawn Boy, Gary Wilkinson, Joe Robinson, Ken Nelson

Badly Drawn Boy chronology
The Hour of Bewilderbeast (2000)	About a Boy (2002)

Singles from The Hour of Bewilderbeast
- 1. "Once Around the Block" Released: August 1999; 2. "Another Pearl" Released: 5 June 2000; 3. "Disillusion" Released: 4 September 2000; 4. "Pissing in the Wind" Released: 7 May 2001

The Hour of Bewilderbeast is the debut studio album by British musician Badly Drawn Boy, released on 26 June 2000. Damon Gough, who performs as Badly Drawn Boy, wrote, produced, and played several instruments on the album's eighteen tracks, several of which also feature accompaniment by members of the British indie rock bands Alfie and Doves. The Hour of Bewilderbeast was released to great critical acclaim and went on to win the 2000 Mercury Prize, and had sold 455,000 copies in the United Kingdom as of September 2011.

== Release ==
The cover art, designed by Andy Votel, is a collage loosely based on Leonardo da Vinci's drawing Vitruvian Man. For the American release of the album, the album's cover was altered to remove a photograph of American actor and director Woody Allen, which was unauthorized by the copyright owners of the photograph. In addition, the song "Magic in the Air" was re-recorded with new instrumental parts to replace a section of the song utilizing lyrics taken from the 1987 song "Love Is Contagious" by R&B singer Taja Sevelle, after Sevelle's publishing company BMG objected to the use of the lyrics.

== Reception and legacy ==
Professional ratings
Aggregate scores
Source	Rating
Metacritic	78/100
Review scores
Source	Rating
AllMusic	4.5/5 stars
Entertainment Weekly	A−
Los Angeles Times	3.5/4 stars
Mojo	4/5 stars
NME	7/10
Pitchfork	8.6/10
Q	4/5 stars
Rolling Stone	3.5/5 stars
Spin	5/10
The Village Voice	A−

The Hour of Bewilderbeast was met with widespread critical acclaim. On the review aggregate site Metacritic, the album holds a score of 78 out of 100, indicating "generally favorable reviews". Michael Hubbard of MusicOMH felt that the album "deserves to do well for many more reasons than the act's name, excellent though it is", and that "a surprise is set loose with every track". Calling the album a "concise tour through the gentler side of British songwriting history", Brent DiCrescenzo of Pitchfork wrote that the varied instrumentation "[attaches] insect wings to the lovely songs" and concluded that with The Hour of Bewilderbeast, "Badly Drawn Boy proves what shallow saps American liberal arts majors can be behind a guitar." AllMusic's John Bush stated that Gough had written and produced "over a dozen excellent songs of baroque folk-pop for his album debut, and the many gems can't help but shine through all the self-indulgence", highlighting Gough's use of humour in his lyrics.

Alternative Press stated that The Hour of Bewilderbeast gives "as full a portrait as possible of Gough's musical and personal life," while David Browne, writing in Entertainment Weekly, called the album an "intimate hour that's far from bewildering." Pat Blashill of Rolling Stone compared Gough to Elliott Smith and Nick Drake and wrote that "like Drake, he's mastered the art of evoking melancholy without slathering on too much sentimentality." Robert Hilburn of the Los Angeles Times drew similar comparisons to Drake, while noting that Gough "never succumbs to Drake's sad solipsism, though, favoring an expansive reach emotionally and musically." In a more mixed assessment, Spin's Barney Hoskyns wrote that "Gough's dewy little tunes are mere scribblings in the margins of alt-folk's dog-eared hook-book, while his too-cool-to-care singing is drip-dry dreary" and that The Hour of Bewilderbeast, when compared to Elliott Smith's Figure 8, makes Gough "look like an imposter."

The Hour of Bewilderbeast appeared on several year-end lists. Pitchfork ranked the album at number 18 on its list of the top 20 albums of 2000. NME ranked the album at number 4 on its list of the 50 best albums of 2000. In addition, the album received the 2000 Mercury Prize, a prize Gough was favoured to win. When Gough received the prize, he tossed the prize money on the ground and said: "I always assumed I was never going to win because good things don't happen to good people normally."

The album was also listed in the book 1001 Albums You Must Hear Before You Die.

== Track listing ==
All music is composed by Badly Drawn Boy (Damon Gough).

No.	Title	Length
1.	"The Shining"	5:18
2.	"Everybody's Stalking"	3:39
3.	"Bewilder"	0:48
4.	"Fall in a River"	2:17
5.	"Camping Next to Water"	3:50
6.	"Stone on the Water"	3:58
7.	"Another Pearl"	4:27
8.	"Body Rap"	0:45
9.	"Once Around the Block"	3:44
10.	"This Song"	1:32
11.	"Bewilderbeast"	3:30
12.	"Magic in the Air"	3:43
13.	"Cause a Rockslide"	5:55
14.	"Pissing in the Wind"	4:19
15.	"Blistered Heart"	1:50
16.	"Disillusion"	5:19
17.	"Say It Again"	4:41
18.	"Epitaph"	3:50

== Personnel ==
Credits for The Hour of Bewilderbeast adapted from album liner notes.

- Badly Drawn Boy (Damon Gough) – vocals, guitars, bass guitar, keyboards, drum machine, harmonica, percussion, vibraphone, xylophone, harp, string arrangement, sound effects
- Spencer Birtwhistle – drums
- Reb Fitzpatrick – drums
- Adrian Dacre – drums
- Jimi Goodwin – bass
- Clare Hewitt – backing vocals
- Sean Kelly – drums, handclaps
- Matt McGeever – cello, handclaps
- Sam Morris – bass, keyboards, French horn, handclaps
- Northern New Orleans Brass Band – horns
- Ian Rainford – handclaps
- Martin Rebelski – Wurlitzer electric piano, clavinet, keyboards
- Joe Robinson – drum programming, loops, theremin, effects, sound effects
- Derrick Santini – handclaps
- Ian Smith – drums, electric guitar, percussion, vibraphone, handclaps
- Paul Taylor – string arrangements
- Andy Votel – drum programming, effects, piano, keyboards, strings samples, samples
- Matt Wardle – piano, organ, synthesizer, keyboards, vocals
- Gary Wilkinson – keyboards, drum programming, sirens, noises
- Andy Williams – drums
- Jez Williams – electric guitar, slide guitar
- Sophie Williams – handclaps

== Charts ==
=== Weekly charts ===
Chart (2000)	Peak position
UK Albums (OCC)	13
US Independent Albums (Billboard)	23
US Heatseekers Albums (Billboard)	36

=== Year-end charts ===
Chart (2000)	Position
UK Albums (OCC)	64
