= Is There Nothing We Could Do? =

Studio album by Badly Drawn Boy
- Released: 14 December 2009
- Genre: Rock; folk
- Length: 42:11
- Label: Big Life
- Producer: Stephen Hilton

Badly Drawn Boy chronology
Born in the U.K. (2006)	Is There Nothing We Could Do? (2009)	It's What I'm Thinking Pt.1 – Photographing Snowflakes (2010)

Professional ratings
Review scores
Source	Rating
Pitchfork	6.6/10
Uncut	2/5 stars

Is There Nothing We Could Do? is the sixth studio album by Badly Drawn Boy, released in 2009. It contains music inspired by the television film The Fattest Man in Britain.

== Track listing ==
1. "Opening Theme" – 1:55
2. "Is There Nothing We Could Do?" – 3:38
3. "A Gentle Touch" – 0:27
4. "All the Trimmings" – 2:11
5. "Welcome Me to Your World" – 3:41
6. "Guitar Medley" – 3:31
7. "Is There Nothing We Could Do? Reprise" – 3:47
8. "Big Brian Arrives" – 2:29
9. "Amy in the Garden" – 1:03
10. "Been There, Verified" – 1:27
11. "Just Look at Us Now?" – 3:33
12. "Wider Than a Smile" – 5:07
13. "Piano Theme" – 2:26
14. "The Letter" – 3:06
15. "I'll Carry On" – 3:58

== Personnel ==
- Damon Gough – vocals, guitars, keyboards
- Che Beresford – drums
- Ollie Collins – bass
- Bob Marsh – trumpet, flugelhorn
- Colin Mcleod – Clavichord, effects, cage
- Norman Mcleod – ladders
- Natalie Dudman – violin
- Sinead Fletcher – cello

=== The Heath Quartet ===
- Oliver Heath – violin 1
- Natalie Dudman – violin 2
- Gary Pomeroy – viola
- Christopher Murray – cello
