= Banana Skin Shoes =

Studio album by Badly Drawn Boy
- Released: 22 May 2020
- Studio: Eve Studios, Stockport
- Length: 50:40
- Label: One Last Fruit
- Producer: Gethin Pearson

Badly Drawn Boy chronology
Being Flynn (2012)	Banana Skin Shoes (2020)

Banana Skin Shoes is the ninth studio album by Badly Drawn Boy, released on 22 May 2020. The track "Is This a Dream?" was released in January 2020. Gough called the song "a sound collage of chaos and confusion to reflect the ridiculous times we live in... A deliberately cartoonesque sonic poke in the eye, to those in whom we place trust, yet instead supply constant barrage of misinformation followed by bad decisions."

== Critical reception ==
Professional ratings
Aggregate scores
Source	Rating
Metacritic	81/100
Review scores
Source	Rating
AllMusic	4/5 stars
Exclaim!	7/10

Banana Skin Shoes was met with "universal acclaim" reviews from critics. At Metacritic, which assigns a weighted average rating out of 100 to reviews from mainstream publications, this release received an average score of 81, based on 7 reviews.

== Track listing ==
Track listing adapted from Tidal.

Banana Skin Shoes track listing
No.	Title	Music	Length
1.	"Banana Skin Shoes"	Damon Gough; Gethin Pearson	2:49
2.	"Is This a Dream?"	Gough	4:08
3.	"I Just Wanna Wish You Happiness"	Gough	3:34
4.	"I'm Not Sure What It Is"	Gough	3:32
5.	"Tony Wilson Said"	Gough	4:18
6.	"You and Me Against the World"	Gough	3:35
7.	"I Need Someone to Trust"	Gough	3:57
8.	"Note to Self"	Gough	3:36
9.	"Colours"	Gough	4:00
10.	"Funny Time of Year"	Gough	3:04
11.	"Fly on the Wall"	Gough	3:32
12.	"Never Change"	Gough; Max Pope	3:19
13.	"Appletree Boulevard"	Gough	3:07
14.	"I'll Do My Best"	Gough	4:09

== Charts ==
Chart performance for Banana Skin Shoes
Chart (2020)	Peak position
Scottish Albums (OCC)	9
UK Albums (OCC)	34
UK Independent Albums (OCC)	4
