= About a Boy (soundtrack) =

Soundtrack album by Badly Drawn Boy
- Released: 8 April 2002
- Genre: Folk rock, folk pop
- Length: 44:22
- Label: Twisted Nerve; XL; ARTISTdirect
- Producer: Badly Drawn Boy, Tom Rothrock, Steve McLaughlin

Badly Drawn Boy chronology
| The Hour of Bewilderbeast (2000) | About a Boy (2002) | Have You Fed the Fish? (2002) |

Singles from About a Boy
- 1. "Silent Sigh" Released: 25 March 2002; 2. "Something to Talk About" Released: 10 June 2002

Professional ratings
Aggregate scores
| Source | Rating |
|---|---|
| Metacritic | 79/100 |
Review scores
| Source | Rating |
| AllMusic | 4.5/5 stars |
| Blender | 4/5 stars |
| Entertainment Weekly | B+ |
| The Guardian | 3/5 stars |
| Los Angeles Times | 3.5/4 stars |
| NME | 8/10 |
| Pitchfork | 4.9/10 |
| Q | 4/5 stars |
| Rolling Stone | 3.5/5 stars |
| Uncut | 3/5 stars |

About a Boy is the second album by English singer-songwriter Badly Drawn Boy (Damon Gough), released in 8 April 2002 under Twisted Nerve Records and XL Recordings, and in America under the short-lived ARTISTdirect Records, as the soundtrack to the film About a Boy. Gough was chosen to compose and perform the entire soundtrack.

In his book 31 Songs, About a Boy author Nick Hornby lists Gough's track "A Minor Incident" as one of the songs that has had an effect on his life.

== Track listing ==
| No. | Title | Length |
|---|---|---|
| 1. | "Exit Stage Right" | 0:21 |
| 2. | "A Peak You Reach" | 4:33 |
| 3. | "Something to Talk About" | 3:41 |
| 4. | "Dead Duck" | 0:45 |
| 5. | "Above You, Below Me" | 2:40 |
| 6. | "I Love NYE" | 3:19 |
| 7. | "Silent Sigh" | 4:44 |
| 8. | "Wet, Wet, Wet" | 0:42 |
| 9. | "River, Sea, Ocean" | 2:24 |
| 10. | "S.P.A.T." | 3:24 |
| 11. | "Rachel's Flat" | 0:34 |
| 12. | "Walking Out of Stride" | 1:48 |
| 13. | "File Me Away" | 3:23 |
| 14. | "A Minor Incident" | 3:44 |
| 15. | "Delta (Little Boy Blues)" | 4:00 |
| 16. | "Donna and Blitzen" | 4:19 |

== Personnel ==
- Damon Gough – vocals, acoustic guitar, electric guitar, bass, piano, synthesizer, keyboards, celeste, Fender Rhodes, xylophone, harmonica, backing vocals, horns, strings, flute, percussion, triangle, co-producer

Additional musicians

- Sasha Krivstsov – bass
- Joey Waronker – drums
- Pete Thomas – drums
- Tom Rothrock – drum programming, synth sweeps, synth, bass, co-producer
- Jon Brion – fuzz guitar, Chamberlin, bass, vibes, voices
- Mike Brenner – lap steel, lap steel noises
- Steve McLaughlin – keyboards, co-producer
- Patrick Seymour – keyboards, conductor
- Jonathan Reese – orchestra leader
- Pete Beechill – trombone
- Jeff Turmes – saxophone
- Chuy Flores – backward noises
- Suzie Katayyama – orchestra arranger & conductor
- Sharon Celani – backing vocals
- Gia Ciambotti – backing vocals
- Ashley Arrison – backing vocals
- London Metropolitan Orchestra – strings

== Charts ==
=== Weekly charts ===
| Chart (2002) | Peak position |
|---|---|
| Australian Albums (ARIA) | 42 |
| Austrian Albums (Ö3 Austria) | 51 |
| Dutch Albums (Album Top 100) | 100 |
| German Albums (Offizielle Top 100) | 53 |
| Irish Albums (IRMA) | 6 |
| Scottish Albums (OCC) | 5 |
| UK Albums (OCC) | 6 |
| US Billboard 200 | 180 |
| US Soundtrack Albums (Billboard) | 11 |

=== Year-end charts ===
| Chart (2002) | Position |
|---|---|
| UK Albums (OCC) | 74 |
