= Have You Fed the Fish? =

Studio album by Badly Drawn Boy
- Released: 5 November 2002
- Recorded: Los Angeles, California
- Genre: Alternative rock
- Length: 50:00
- Label: Twisted Nerve
- Producer: Tom Rothrock, Badly Drawn Boy

Badly Drawn Boy chronology
About a Boy (2002)	Have You Fed the Fish? (2002)	One Plus One Is One (2004)

Singles from Have You Fed The Fish
- 1. "You Were Right" Released: 14 October 2002; 2. "Born Again" Released: 6 January 2003; 3. "All Possibilities" Released: 21 April 2003

Professional ratings
Aggregate scores
Source	Rating
Metacritic	77/100
Review scores
Source	Rating
AllMusic	3/5 stars
Entertainment Weekly	B+
The Guardian	3/5 stars
Los Angeles Times	2.5/4 stars
NME	8/10
Pitchfork	6.6/10
Q	4/5 stars
Rolling Stone	4/5 stars
Spin	7/10
The Village Voice	A−

Have You Fed the Fish? is the third album released by Badly Drawn Boy (born Damon Gough) in 2002. The album's title originates from the question which Gough asks his daughter each day "to the point where it got to sound like one of those words you say too many times and it sounds silly."

Also included with the album's release was a competition. Placed within certain copies of the album, the "5 Golden Fish" would win the owner a song writing session with Gough. However, the prizes remain unclaimed. The fish, it seems, have remained hidden.

In 2003 Damon presented the Manchester 24 photographic gallery with a picture of his children's goldfish after being asked to take photos of his life during a 24-hour period. "It's either me or my girlfriend or my daughter. I let her feed them but she tends to overfeed them which can kill them and if you don't feed them enough that can kill them, so it's real poignant subject. You've got to be careful with fish."

Have You Fed The Fish? contained Badly Drawn Boy's highest-charting single "You Were Right", which received heavy airplay on BBC Radio 2 and got to number 9 in the charts—his only top ten single. "You Were Right" also earned him a performance on BBC Television's Top of the Pops.

== Cover art ==
The album art and sleeves feature some famous names.

- Lady on front cover: Jane Birkin; her daughter Charlotte Gainsbourg sings on the album.
- Man on reverse with mustache: a Groucho Marx puppet.
- Inside pages: Damon's girlfriend Clare, and their children Eddie and Oscar.
- On the boat in the inside pages: Damon Gough; Anna of Misty Dixon fame; DJ and artist Andy Votel; Jane Weaver, also from Misty Dixon; Dave Tyack.

The photo of Damon alongside the album credits was taken in his house.

== Track listing ==
All tracks written by Damon Michael Gough

1. "Coming in to Land" – 1:37
  - Synth, Piano, Guitars & Percussion – Badly Drawn Boy
  - Drums – Joey Waronker
  - Bass – Sasha Kristov
  - Strings Arranged & Conducted by Matt Dunkley
2. "Have You Fed the Fish?" – 4:18
  - Synth, Piano, Guitars & Vocals – Badly Drawn Boy
  - Drums – Joey Waronker
  - Bass – Sasha Kristov
  - Additional Guitar – John "Gumby" Goodwin
3. "Born Again" – 4:40
  - Guitars, Piano & Vocals – Badly Drawn Boy
  - Drums – Joey Waronker
  - Bass – Sasha Kristov
  - Additional Guitar – John "Gumby" Goodwin
  - Background Vocals – Sharon Celani, Gia Ciambotti, Drew Arrison & Gemma Gough
4. "40 Days, 40 Fights" – 3:55
  - Piano, Guitars, Tambourine & Vocals – Badly Drawn Boy
  - Drums – Danny Heifetz
  - Bass – Sasha Kristov
  - Background Vocals – Sharon Celani, Gia Ciambotti
  - Shaker – Tom Rothrock
5. "All Possibilities" – 3:54
  - Guitars, Piano, Tambourine & Vocals – Badly Drawn Boy
  - Drums – Danny Heifetz
  - Bass – Sasha Kristov
  - Horns – Probyn Gregory
  - Synth – Tom Rothrock
  - Strings Arranged & Conducted by Matt Dunkley
6. "I Was Wrong" – 1:10
7. "You Were Right" – 4:52
  - Guitars, Piano, Synth & Vocals – Badly Drawn Boy
  - Drums – Joey Waronker
  - Bass – Sasha Kristov
  - Steel Guitar – John "Gumby" Goodwin
  - Strings Arranged & Conducted by Matt Dunkley
8. "Centrepeace" – 1:49
  - Strings Arranged & Conducted by Matt Dunkley
9. "How?" – 5:17
  - Guitars, Piano & Vocals – Badly Drawn Boy
  - Drums – Danny Heifetz
  - Bass, Chamberlain Strings, Fuzz Guitar, Electric Guitar – Jon Brion
  - Strings Arranged & Conducted by Matt Dunkley & Jon Brion
  - Horns – Probyn Gregory
10. "The Further I Slide" – 3:47
  - Guitars, Clavier, Flute & Vocals – Badly Drawn Boy
  - Drums, Percussion – Pete Thomas
  - Bass – Sasha Kristov
  - Background Vocals – Sharon Celani, Gia Ciambotti
  - Horns – Probyn Gregory
  - Casio Solo, Chamberlin – Jon Brion
11. "Imaginary Lines" – 0:45
  - Guitars & Vocals – Badly Drawn Boy
  - Drums – Joey Waronker
  - Bass – Sasha Kristov
12. "Using Our Feet" – 4:10
  - Guitars, Piano & Vocals – Badly Drawn Boy
  - Drums, Percussion – Joey Waronker
  - Drum Programming – Tom Rothrock
  - Bass – Sasha Kristov
  - Background Vocals – Sharon Celani & Gia Ciambotti
  - Chorus Background Vocals – Charlotte Gainsbourg
13. "Tickets to What You Need" – 2:48
  - Piano, Guitars, Synth, Chamberlain Strings & Vocals – Badly Drawn Boy
  - Drums – Joey Waronker
  - Bass – Sasha Kristov
  - Slide Guitar – John "Gumby" Goodwin
14. "What Is It Now?" – 2:42
  - Guitars, Piano & Vocals – Badly Drawn Boy
  - Drums, Percussion – Pete Thomas
  - Bass – Sasha Kristov
  - Horns – Danny Heifetz
  - Background Vocals – Charlotte Gainsbourg
15. "Bedside Story" – 4:53
  - Piano, Guitars, Synth & Vocals – Badly Drawn Boy
  - Drum Programming & Skateboard – Tom Rothrock
  - Drums – Danny Heifetz
  - Bass – Sasha Kristov
  - Strings Arranged & Conducted by Matt Dunkley
  - Background Vocals – Clare Hewitt

== Personnel ==
- Badly Drawn Boy – guitars, vocals, piano, synthesizer, tambourine, Clavier, percussion, flute, Chamberlain strings
- Joey Waronker – drums, percussion
- Sasha Kristov – bass
- Matt Dunkley – string arrangement and conducting
- John "Gumby" Goodwin – additional guitar, slide guitar, steel guitar
- Sharon Celani – backing vocals
- Gia Ciambotti – backing vocals
- Drew Arrison – backing vocals
- Gemma Gough – backing vocals
- Danny Heifetz – drums, horns
- Tom Rothrock – drum programming, synthesizer, shaker, skateboard
- Probyn Gregory – horns
- Jon Brion – electric guitar, fuzz guitar, bass, Casio solo, Chamberlin, Chamberlain strings, string arrangement and conducting
- Pete Thomas – drums, percussion
- Charlotte Gainsbourg – backing vocals, chorus backing vocals
- Clare Hewitt – backing vocals
