= Badly Drawn Boy =

English singer-songwriter

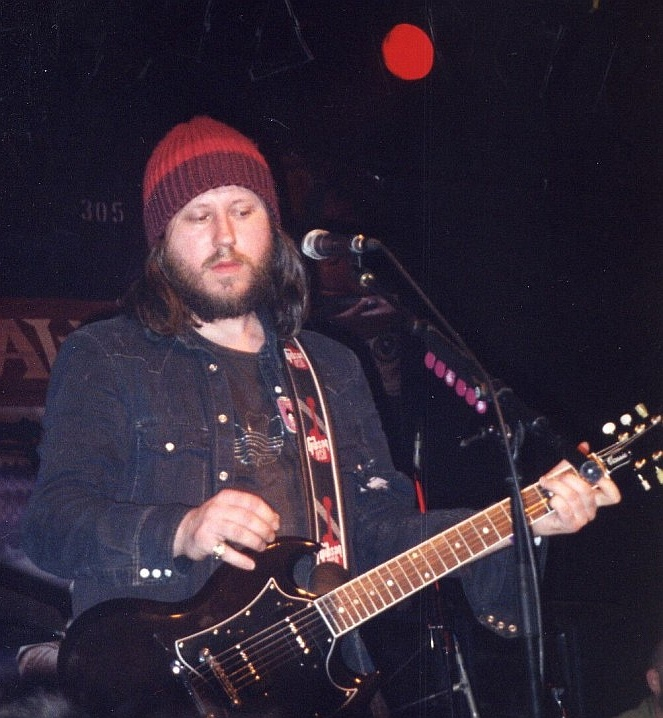

Background information
- Born: Damon Michael Gough; 2 October 1969 (age 57); Dunstable, Bedfordshire, England
- Origin: Bolton, Greater Manchester, England
- Genres: Indie rock, indie folk, lo-fi
- Occupation: Singer-songwriter
- Instruments: Guitar, vocals, bass, drums, percussion, banjo, piano, keyboards, harmonica
- Years active: 1995–present
- Labels: Twisted Nerve Records; XL Recordings (1998–2004); EMI (2006–2008); BDB Records/One Last Fruit (2009–present)
- Website: badlydrawnboy.co.uk

Damon Michael Gough (born 2 October 1969), known by the stage name Badly Drawn Boy, is an English indie singer-songwriter and multi-instrumentalist.

Gough chose his stage name from a character in the show The Magic Ball, which he saw on TV at a party in Trafford, Greater Manchester, in 1995. Before he thought of using this name he made some business cards, each one unique, with a printed picture of a drawing by his nephew and a small collage by Gough.

At the Generation X bar in Manchester, Gough met Andy Votel, who was DJing that night. Gough was there to attend friends Scott Abraham and Damon Hayhurst's contributions to an exhibition by the Space Monkey Clothing Company. The chance meeting led to the foundation of Twisted Nerve Records.

Gough is known for wearing beanie hats in public appearances, which started early in his career, when he was doing a lot of gigs, and also if his "hair wasn't looking too good".

In 2002, Q magazine named Badly Drawn Boy in their list of the "50 Bands to See Before You Die", although this was as part of a sub-list of "5 Bands That Could Go Either Way" on account of Gough's tendency to talk and tell stories for extended periods in concert rather than play songs.

== History ==
=== Early years ===
Gough, though born in Dunstable, Bedfordshire, grew up in the Breightmet area of Bolton, Greater Manchester, England. He cites Bruce Springsteen as his music hero. His recording career began in September 1997 with the five track vinyl release EP1. This was distributed among friends and family members.

In April 1998, Gough released his second EP, EP2. This had one track less than its predecessor but twice as many copies were pressed. The highlight track, "I Love You All", was later transferred to a music box which was released alongside the EP. The box plays eleven seconds of the song and is considered much rarer than the record itself due to its limited production.

Gough's third EP, EP3, was released in November 1998 on both CD and vinyl formats, and was the first release in what became a long-term partnership with XL Recordings. In the same year he collaborated with Unkle for their first album Psyence Fiction. "Road Movie" was released as a live recording with the band Doves. The B-side to the single was another track from the EP, "My Friend Cubilas". Music videos were recorded for both tracks.

=== Mainstream success: 1999–2002 ===
It Came from the Ground was the next EP, released in March 1999 on CD and vinyl. The style of this recording focused on woodland environments, an aspect displayed in both the cover art and the title track's video. Also released during this period was the single "Whirlpool". An instrumental was released on vinyl in April 1999.

Gough's last EP, Once Around the Block, was released in August 1999 in two vinyl formats and one CD edition. The release is almost short enough to be considered a single.

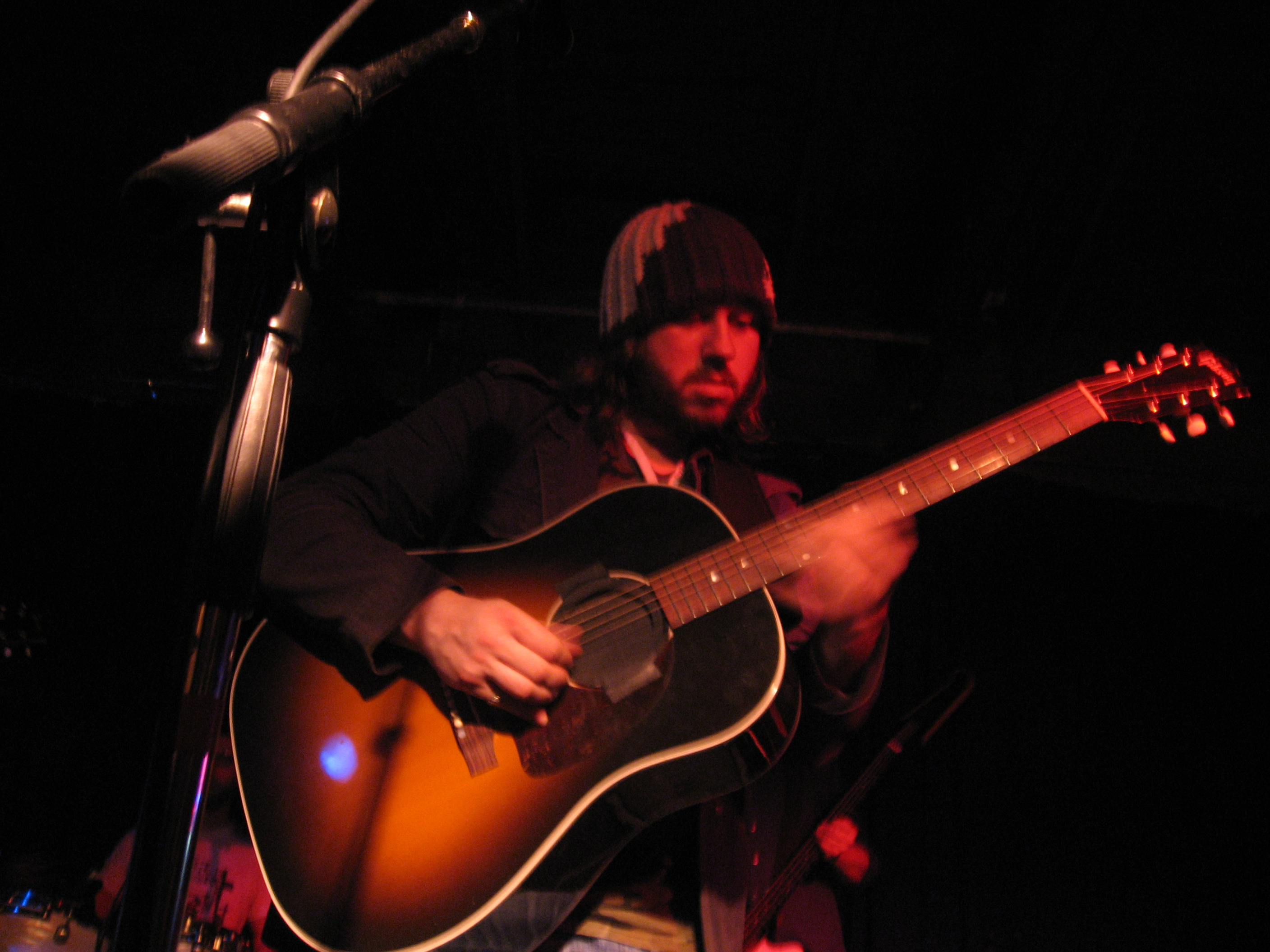
Gough playing a show in the Urban Lounge, Salt Lake City, Utah. (March 2007)

Following the success of his early EPs, Gough's first album, The Hour of Bewilderbeast, was released in June 2000, accompanied by four singles (including a re-release of Once Around the Block).

The album was critically acclaimed and Badly Drawn Boy was successful in winning the 2000 Mercury Music Prize, beating his contemporaries Doves to the £20,000 prize. The album sold well (300,000 copies) and is widely considered to be his defining work.

The Badly Drawn Boy band throughout this successful period consisted of Matt Wardle (keyboards/vocals), Robin File (guitar), Sean McCann (bass guitar) latterly replaced by the ex-Smiths bass guitarist Andy Rourke, Dave Verner (drums).

After a short break, Gough returned to score the film adaptation of Nick Hornby's novel About a Boy. The movie was directed by Paul Weitz and Chris Weitz. Impressed by his past work, the Weitz brothers asked Gough to score the film, a task which he undertook alone, with the assistance of producer Steve McLaughlin. Three singles from the album were released during 2002.

His third album, Have You Fed the Fish?, introduced more guitars and an increasingly mainstream pop sound which was not welcomed by all critics. The album is a play on Gough's minor celebrity status. Another three singles and a long American tour accompanied the album. The single "You Were Right" received heavy airplay on BBC Radio 2, became his first UK top ten single and includes lyrical references to music icons such as Madonna and John Lennon.

=== Later years ===
After his long spell in America, Gough suffered from homesickness and decided to record his next album closer to home. Recorded at Moolah Rouge studios in Stockport, Greater Manchester, One Plus One Is One was a portrait of his personal life. Documenting a death of a close friend and the loss of a grandfather in the Battle of Normandy, the album was released in 2004. It was not a great commercial success, and Gough decided to leave his contract with XL Recordings after only one single was released. He then signed to EMI.

Two years went by before Born in the U.K., which aimed to explain Gough's experience of growing up in the United Kingdom. The album was promoted with a small UK tour, profits from which were donated to Oxfam, a charity which "offers the chance for thousands of people to use music to achieve something together, which is an idea that gets me excited", said Gough. Gough also toured the US behind the album.

The album Is There Nothing We Could Do?, with music taken from and inspired by the film, The Fattest Man in Britain, was released on his own BDB Records label in 2009.

His seventh album, It's What I'm Thinking Pt.1 – Photographing Snowflakes, the first of a planned trilogy of albums all to be released under the title It's What I'm Thinking, was released in October 2010. For some of the tracks on this album he used his current live band, which consisted of Manchester musical friends Mike TV of Beats for beginners on guitar, Stephen Fretwell on bass and Jay Sikora on drums

In 2011, a portrait of Gough painted by British artist Joe Simpson was exhibited around the UK including a solo exhibition at The Royal Albert Hall.

In March 2012, he released another soundtrack, for Being Flynn, directed by Paul Weitz who had worked with Gough previously on the soundtrack album About a Boy.

In July 2015, to mark the fifteenth anniversary of the release of The Hour of the Bewilderbeast, Gough undertook a short UK tour.

In 2020 he released his first studio album for 10 years, Banana Skin Shoes.

== Documentary and media appearances ==
There have been three documentaries made about Badly Drawn Boy: Open Map in 2007, Ipso Facto in 2010, and About A Badly Drawn Boy. The first two tour documentaries remain unreleased, while the last, about Gough and his debut album The Hour of Bewilderbeast, was released in 2018.

In December 2015, Badly Drawn Boy appeared on a celebrity edition of Mastermind. His specialist subject was the singer Bruce Springsteen.

In October 2017, he had a cameo role in the final episode of Cold Feet (Series 7) where he played a busker.

== Discography ==
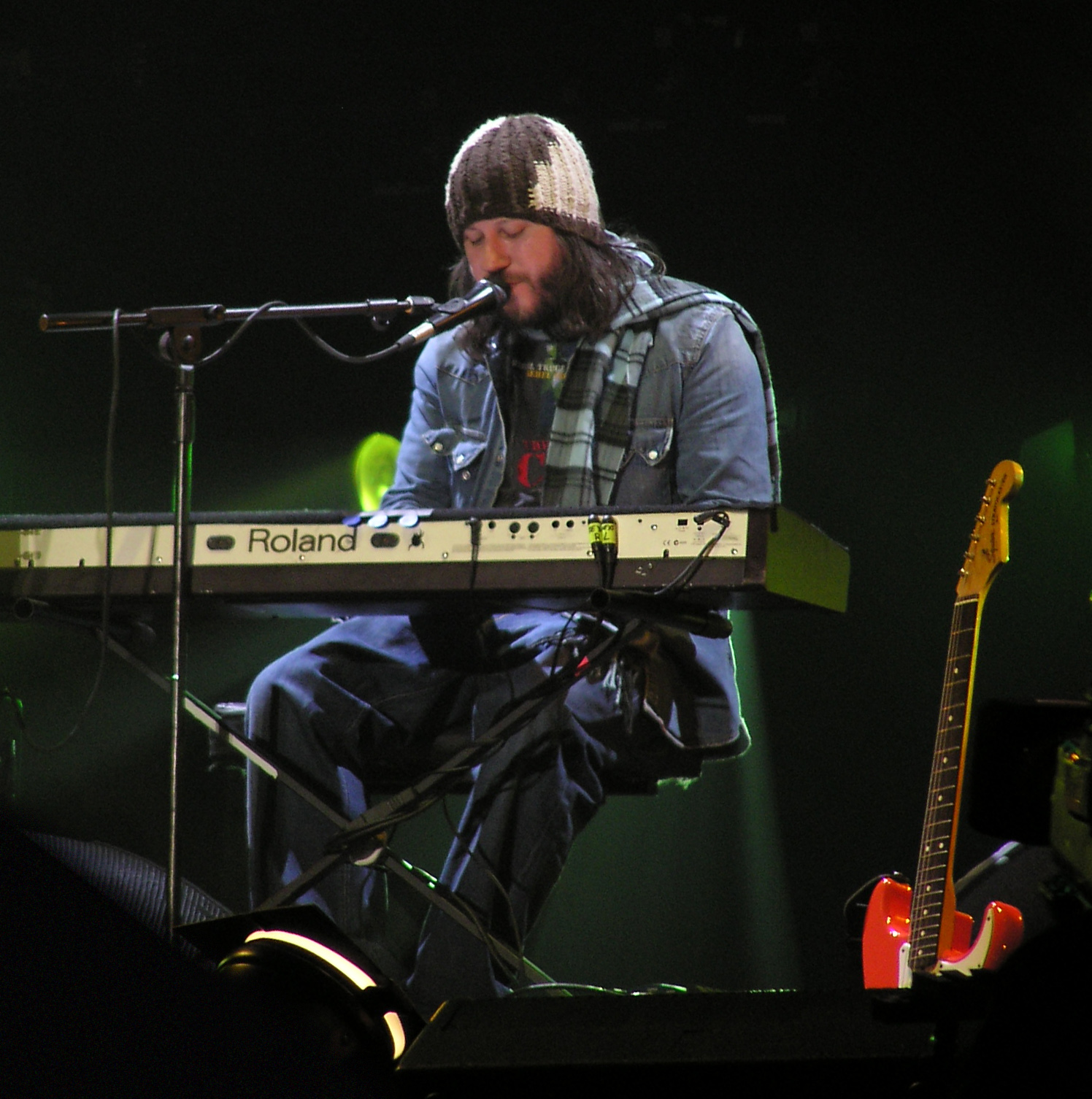
Badly Drawn Boy performing at the Tsunami Relief Cardiff concert in January 2005

- The Hour of Bewilderbeast (2000)
- About a Boy (2002)
- Have You Fed the Fish? (2002)
- One Plus One Is One (2004)
- Born in the U.K. (2006)
- Is There Nothing We Could Do? (2009)
- It's What I'm Thinking Pt.1 – Photographing Snowflakes (2010)
- Being Flynn (2012)
- Banana Skin Shoes (2020)
